= Ladysmith Black Mambazo discography =

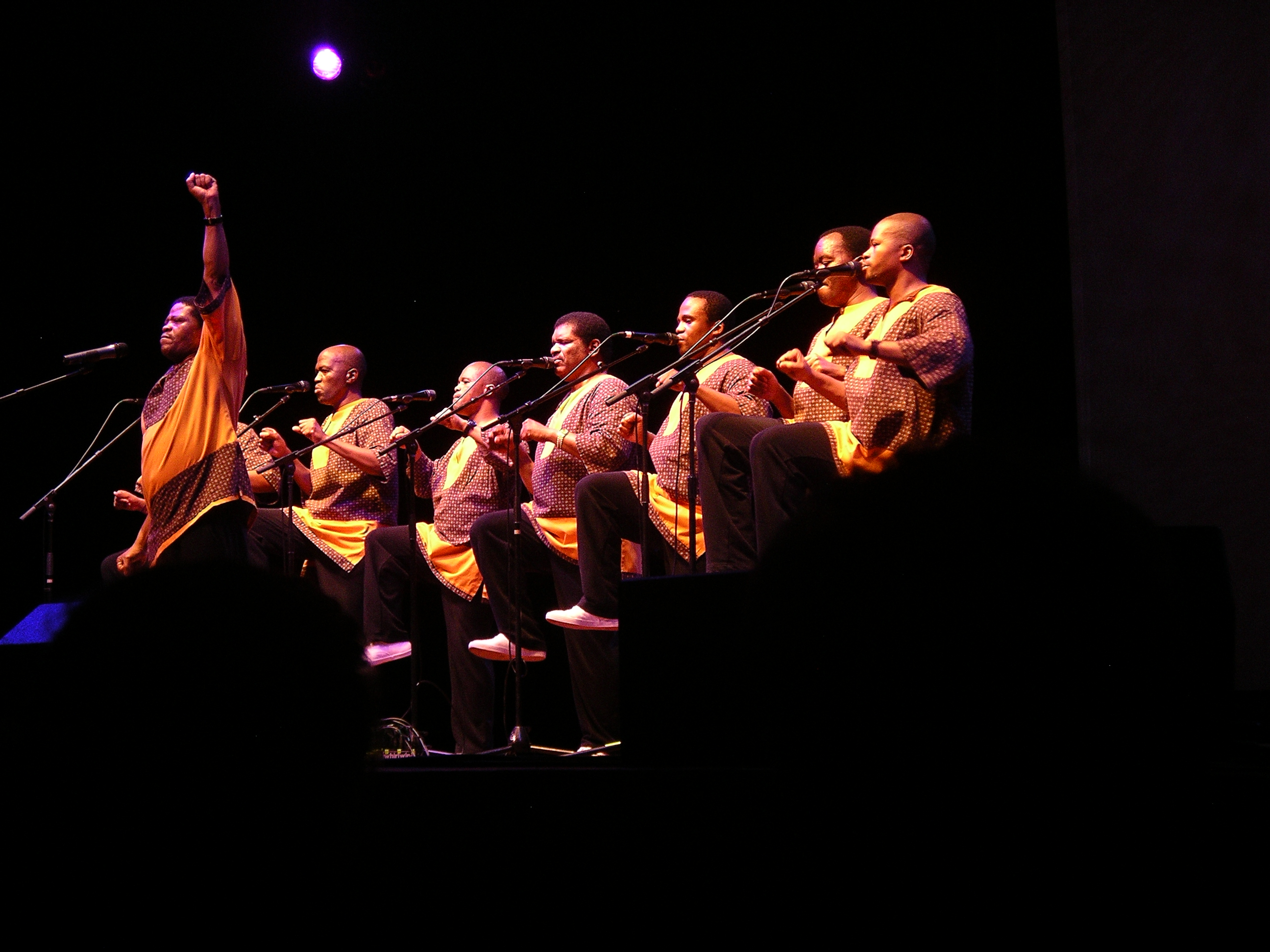
Live performance photo.

This is a near-complete list of recordings made by the South African vocal group Ladysmith Black Mambazo.

The group was offered a recording contract to Gallo Record Company, the largest record company in South Africa, in 1973. They accepted, and remain with the studio today. Ladysmith Black Mambazo's first release Amabutho (1973) sold over 25,000 copies and became the first release in South Africa by Black musicians to receive gold status. Their early recordings – recorded for Gallo's 'black music' division Mavuthela Music Company – sold very well.

In 1975, Shabalala converted to Christianity and the group released their first religious album, Ukukhanya Kwelanga. It earned a double platinum disc award, and the group's repertoire came to be dominated by hymns, mostly Methodist. Their 1976 Ukusindiswa became one of their most popular religious albums. By 1981, the group was well known throughout South Africa, and was allowed to travel to Cologne, Germany. The group toured the country and appeared on television, and learned some of the German language; the 1981 album Phansi Emgodini included a German-language song, "Wir Grüssen Euch Alle". The following year, the group traveled back to Germany to appear on a televised quiz show, bringing about requests for live appearances.

Ladysmith Black Mambazo has since released over fifty studio recordings; many more assorted compilations, cassette tapes, videotapes, and DVDs have been released.

== Discography ==
=== Albums ===
Title of release	Record label and catalogue number	Year	UK chart position
Amabutho	Gallo (Motella BL 14)	1973	
Imbongi	Gallo (Motella BL 18)	1973	
Ufakazi Yibheshu	Gallo (Mavuthela BL 22)	1973	
Umama Lo!	Gallo (Mavuthela BL 23)	1974	
Isitimela	Gallo (Motella BL 27)	1974	
Ukukhanya Kwelanga	Gallo (Motella BL 35)	1975	
Amaqhawe	Gallo (Motella BL 81)	1976	
Ukusindiswa	Gallo (Motella BL 86)	1977	
Shintsha Sithothobala	Gallo (Motella BL 91)	1977	
Phezulu Emafini	Gallo (Motella BL 92)	1977	
Ushaka	Gallo (Ezomdabu BL 129)	1978	
Indlela yaseZulwini	Gallo (Ezomdabu BL 153)	1978	
Ezinkulu	Gallo (Ezomdabu BL 186)	1979	
Intokozo	Gallo (Ezomdabu BL 205)	1980	
Nqonqotha Mfana	Gallo (Ezomdabu BL 253)	1980	
Ulwandle Oluncgwele	Gallo (Ezomdabu BL 300)	1981	
Cologne Zulu Festival	Network (5????)	1981	
Phansi Emgodini	Gallo (Ezomdabu BL 321)	1981	
Umthombo Wamanzi	Gallo (Ezomdabu BL 353)	1982	
Induku Zethu	Gallo (Ezomdabu BL 393)	1983	
Ibhayibheli Liyindlela	Gallo (Ezomdabu BL 472)	1984	
Inkazimulo	Gallo (Ezomdabu BL 504)	1985	
Inala	Gallo (Ezomdabu BL 531)	1985	
Ezulwini Siyakhona	Gallo (Ezomdabu BL 548)	1986	
Shaka Zulu	Warner Bros (1-25582)	1987	34
Thandani	Gallo (Ezomdabu BL 613)	1987	
Inala (reissue)	Shanachie (SH 43040)	1987	
Induku Zethu (reissue)	Shanachie (SH 43021)	1987	
Ulwandle Olungcwele (reissue)	Shanachie (SH 43030)	1987	
Umthombo Wamanzi (reissue)	Shanachie (SH 430??)	1987	
Zibuyinhlazane	Gallo (Ezomdabu HUL 40131)	1988	
Journey of Dreams	Warner Bros (1-25753)	1988	
Isigqi Zendoda	Gallo (HUL 40203/CDGMP 40203)	1990	
Two Worlds One Heart	Warner Bros (1-26125)	1990	
Zulu Traditional	JVC World Sounds (JVC VICG-5230)	1990	
Favourites	Gallo (HUL 40300/CDGMP 40300)	1992	
Classic Tracks	Shanachie (SH 43074)	1992	
The Best of Ladysmith Black Mambazo - Vol 1	Shanachie (SH 43098)	1992	
Liph' Iqiniso	Gallo (CDGMP 40392)	1993	
Gift of the Tortoise	Gallo (CDGMP 40451)	1994	
Zulu Hits Vol. 1	Gallo (CDGMP 40616)	1995	
Gospel Hits Vol. 2	Gallo (CDGMP 40617)	1995	
Shosholoza (with the Team Shosholoza)	Gallo (CDSING 8 I)	1995	
Thuthukani Ngoxolo	Gallo (CDGMP 40641)	1996	
Ukuzala-Ukuzelula (with the Mahubo Nesigekle Ladies Choir)	Gallo (CDGMP 40691)	1995	
Heavenly	Gallo (CDGMP 40697)	1997	53
Heavenly	UMTV (540 790 2)	1997	
The Best of (VHS)	Gallo (GMPV 11)	1997	
Very Best of – Spirit of South Africa	Nascente (NSCD 021)	1998	
The Best of Ladysmith Black Mambazo – The Star and the Wiseman	UMTV (568 988 2)	1998	2
The Best of Ladysmith Black Mambazo – The Star and the Wiseman	Gallo (CDESP 020)	1998	
Inala (reissue)	Wrasse (WRASS 001)	1999	
Thuthukani Ngoxolo (reissue)	Wrasse (WRASS 002)	1999	
Zibuyinhlazane (reissue)	Wrasse (WRASS 003)	1999	
Liph' Iqiniso (reissue)	Wrasse (WRASS 004)	1999	
Gospel Songs	Wrasse (WRASS 005)	2000	
In Harmony (Ladysmith Black Mambazo album)	Wrasse/UMTV (153739-2)	1999	15
Live at the Royal Albert Hall (DVD/VHS)	Shanachie (SH DV-108)	1999	
Live at the Royal Albert Hall	Shanachie (SH 66023)	1999	
In Harmony - Live at the Royal Albert Hall	Wrasse/UMTV (WRASV 001)	1999	
Lihl' Ixhiba Likagogo	Gallo (CDGMP 40830)	2000	
Thandani/Umthombo Wamanzi	Gallo From the Archives (CDGSP 3007)	2001	
Favourites	Wrasse (WRASS 017)	2001	
The Ultimate Collection	Wrasse/UMTV (556 682 2)	2001	37
Congratulations South Africa - The Ultimate Collection	Wrasse/UMTV (WRASS 037)	2001	
Friends in Concert (with Lucky Dube and Jabu Khanyile)	Gallo (GWVCD 042)	2002	
Ukusindiswa/Umthombo Wamanzi	Gallo From the Archives (CDGSP 3012)	2002	
Chillout Sessions	Wrasse (WRASS 067)	2002	
Wenyukela	Gallo (CDGMP 40892)	2003	
Raise Your Spirit Higher (Wenyukela)	Wrasse (WRASS 100)	2003	
Raise Your Spirit Higher [Wenyukela]	Heads Up International/Gallo (HUCD 3082, **HUSA 9082**)	2004	
The Very Best of - Rain, Rain Beautiful Rain	Wrasse (WRASS 132)	2004	
No Boundaries with the English Chamber Orchestra	Heads Up International/Gallo (GWVCD 060)	2004	
No Boundaries with the English Chamber Orchestra	Heads Up International/Gallo (HUCD 3092, **HUSA 9092**)	2005	
The Best of (reissue)	Gallo (GMVDVD 025)	2005	
Live at Montreux	Eagle Records/Red (EE 39023 2)	2005	
Live at Montreux (DVD)	Eagle Records/Red (EREDV382)	2005	
Long Walk to Freedom (international)	Heads Up International/Gallo (HUCD 3109, **HUSA 9109**)	2006	
Long Walk to Freedom (South African release) (South Africa only)	Gallo (CDGMP 40952)	2006	
The Best of - Essential Tribute	Budget (ABLCD121)	2006	
The Hits (CD/DVD set)	Gallo (GMVCOM 1000)	2006	
Phansi Emgodini (reissue)	Gallo Archives (CDBL 1024)	2006	
Ulwandle Olungcwele (reissue)	Gallo Archives (CDBL 1023)	2006	
Ezulwini Siyakhona (reissue)	Gallo Archives (CDBL 1030)	2006	
Thandani (reissue)	Gallo Archives (CDBL 1031)	2006	
Ukusindiswa (reissue)	Gallo Archives (CDBL 1033)	2006	
Ushaka (reissue)	Gallo Archives (CDBL 1014)	2007	
Amabutho (reissue)	Gallo Archives (CDBL 1015)	2007	
Indlela yaseZulwini (reissue)	Gallo Archives (CDBL 1016)	2007	
Imbongi (reissue)	Gallo Archives (CDBL 1017)	2007	
Ezinkulu (reissue)	Gallo Archives (CDBL 1018)	2007	
Intokozo (reissue)	Gallo Archives (CDBL 1019)	2007	
Umama Lo! (reissue)	Gallo Archives (CDBL 1020)	2007	
Isitimela (reissue)	Gallo Archives (CDBL 1021)	2007	
Nqonqotha Mfana (reissue)	Gallo Archives (CDBL 1022)	2007	
Umthombo Wamanzi (reissue)	Gallo Archives (CDBL 1026)	2007	
Ibhayibheli Liyindlela (reissue)	Gallo Archives (CDBL 1028)	2007	
Inkazimulo (reissue)	Gallo Archives (CDBL 1029)	2007	
Amaqhawe (reissue)	Gallo Archives (CDBL 1032)	2007	
Phezulu Emafini (reissue)	Gallo Archives (CDBL 1034)	2007	
Shintsha Sithothobala (reissue)	Gallo Archives (CDBL 1035)	2007	
Inala (reissue)	Gallo Archives (CDBL 1036)	2007	
Ilembe	Gallo (CDGMP 40976)	2007	
Ilembe - Our Tribute to King Shaka (international)	Warner Jazz	2007	
Ilembe: Honoring Shaka Zulu	Heads Up International/Gallo (HUCD 3133, **HUSA 9133**)	2008	
My Dream - African Sounds - with the SABC Choir	Gallo (CDGMP 41012)	2008	
Kobuye Kulunge	Gallo (CDGMP 41027)	2010	
Songs from a Zulu Farm	Listen 2 Entertainment	2011	
Ladysmith Black Mambazo & Friends	Listen 2 Entertainment	2012	
Live: Singing for Peace Around The World	Ladysmith Black Mambazo	2013	
Always with Us	Ladysmith Black Mambazo	2014	
Music from Inala: Aa Zulu Ballet	Ladysmith Black Mambazo	2014	
Walking in the Footsteps of Our Fathers	Ladysmith Black Mambazo	2016	
Shaka Zulu Revisited	Ladysmith Black Mambazo	2017	
Songs of Peace and Love for Kids and Parents Around the World	Ladysmith Black Mambazo	2017	
Soothe my soul	Ladysmith Black Mambazo	2023	

Catalogue numbers in bold represent Hybrid SACD and/or enhanced versions

=== Singles ===
- 1986: "Diamonds on the Soles of Her Shoes" (Paul Simon feat. Ladysmith Black Mambazo) (from Paul Simon album Graceland)
- 1995: "Swing Low, Sweet Chariot" (China Black & Ladysmith Black Mambazo)
- 1999: "Ain't No Sunshine" (Ladysmith Black Mambazo feat. Des'ree)
- 1999: "I Shall Be There" (B*Witched feat. Ladysmith Black Mambazo)
- 2014: "Lift Me Up" (David Guetta feat. Nico & Vinz & Ladysmith Black Mambazo) (from David Guetta album Listen)
- 2019: "Thula Ungakhlai" (Rudimental feat. Ladysmith Black Mambazo) (from Rudimental album Toast to Our Differences)
