= List of South African Grammy Award winners and nominees =

Miriam Makeba was the first African singer to win a Grammy Award.

South African artists have collectively won a total of 34 Grammy Awards from 114 nominations. South African recording artist Miriam Makeba is widely reported as having been the first African Grammy winner when she won Best Folk Recording for An Evening With Belafonte/Makeba in 1966 at the 8th Annual Grammy Awards, although Phil Ramone, who was born in South Africa and moved to the United States as a child, won a Grammy a year earlier. Makeba won her award while fighting the apartheid regime in South Africa during an exile from the country which lasted from 1960 until 1990.

South Africa has produced thirteen Grammy Award winners. (Note: Including Herbert Kretzmer, who was born and raised in Kroonstad, Free State, South Africa and moved to London, England in the early 1950s) Ramone, a sound engineer, is the most honoured with fourteen accolades, followed by Ladysmith Black Mambazo with five and the Soweto Gospel Choir with three. In 2022, Black Coffee won the Grammy Award for Best Dance/Electronic Album for Subconsciously at the 64th Annual Grammy Awards, making him the first African to win the category for an original work. Nomcebo Zikode won her first Grammy in 2023, alongside Wouter Kellerman and Zakes Bantwini for "Bayethe". In 2024, Tyla was named the youngest African soloist to win a Grammy after receiving the inaugural Best African Music Performance award for "Water" at the 66th Annual Grammy Awards. Nominated artists include Hugh Masekela and Trevor Noah.

== 1960s and 1970s ==
List of Grammy Award winners and nominees from 1960 to 1979
Year (Note: Indicates the year of ceremony. Each year is linked to the article about the awards held that year, wherever possible.)	Category	Nominee(s)	Work	Result	Ref.
1961	Best New Artist of 1960	Miriam Makeba		Nominated	
1961	Best Performance – Folk	Miriam Makeba	Miriam Makeba	Nominated	
1961	Best Vocal Performance Album, Female	Miriam Makeba	Miriam Makeba	Nominated	
1964	Best Folk Recording	Miriam Makeba	The World of Miriam Makeba	Nominated	
1964	Best Vocal Performance, Female	Miriam Makeba	The World of Miriam Makeba	Nominated	
1965	Best Engineered Recording – Non-Classical	Phil Ramone	Getz/Gilberto	Won	
1965	Best Folk Recording	Miriam Makeba	The Voice of Africa	Nominated	
1966	Best Folk Recording	Miriam Makeba	An Evening with Belafonte/Makeba	Won	
1966	Best Folk Recording	Miriam Makeba	Makeba Sings!	Nominated	
1967	Best Engineered Recording – Non-Classical	Phil Ramone	Presenting Thad Jones/Mel Lewis and the Jazz Orchestra	Nominated	
1967	Best Engineered Recording – Non-Classical	Phil Ramone	Presenting Joe Williams and Thad Jones/Mel Lewis, the Jazz Orchestra	Nominated	
1969	Best Contemporary-Pop Performance, Instrumental	Hugh Masekela	Grazing in the Grass	Nominated	
1970	Best Score from the Original Cast Show Album	Phil Ramone	Promises, Promises	Won	
1974	Best Score from the Original Cast Show Album	Phil Ramone	Pippin	Nominated	
1974	Best Score from the Original Cast Show Album	Phil Ramone	Cyrano	Nominated	
1974	Album of the Year	Phil Ramone	There Goes Rhymin' Simon	Nominated	
1975	Best Score from the Original Cast Show Album	Phil Ramone	The Magic Show	Nominated	
1976	Album of the Year	Phil Ramone	Still Crazy After All These Years	Won	
1976	Best Cast Show Album	Phil Ramone	Chicago	Nominated	
1977	Record of the Year	Phil Ramone	"50 Ways to Leave Your Lover"	Nominated	
1978	Record of the Year	Phil Ramone	"Evergreen"	Nominated	
1979	Record of the Year	Phil Ramone	"Just the Way You Are"	Won	
1979	Producer of the Year	Phil Ramone		Nominated	

== 1980s ==
List of Grammy Award winners and nominees from 1980 to 1989
Year	Category	Nominee(s)	Work	Result	Ref.
1980	Album of the Year	Phil Ramone	52nd Street	Won	
1981	Album of the Year	Phil Ramone	Glass Houses	Nominated	
1981	Producer of the Year, Non-Classical	Phil Ramone		Won	
1983	Album of the Year	Phil Ramone	The Nylon Curtain	Nominated	
1984	Album of the Year	Phil Ramone	An Innocent Man	Nominated	
1984	Best Album of Original Score Written for a Motion Picture or a Television Special	Phil Ramone	Flashdance	Won	
1984	Record of the Year	Phil Ramone	"Maniac"	Nominated	
1984	Best Cast Show Album	Phil Ramone	Little Shop of Horrors	Nominated	
1984	Producer of the Year, Non-Classical	Phil Ramone		Nominated	
1985	Best Rock Instrumental Performance	Trevor Rabin	"Cinema"	Won	
1985	Best Rock Performance by a Duo or Group with Vocal	Trevor Rabin	90125	Nominated	
1985	Best Pop Performance by a Duo or Group with Vocal	Trevor Rabin	"Owner of a Lonely Heart"	Nominated	
1985	Best Vocal Arrangement for Two or More Voices	Trevor Rabin	"Leave it"	Nominated	
1987	Best Music Video, Long Form	Trevor Rabin	9012Live	Nominated	
1988	Best Rock Performance by a Duo or Group with Vocal	Trevor Rabin	Big Generator	Nominated	
1988	Best Traditional Folk Recording	Ladysmith Black Mambazo	Shaka Zulu	Won	
1988	Best Musical Cast Show Album	Herbert Kretzmer	Les Miserables	Won	
1988	Best R&B Instrumental Performance (Orchestra, Group or Soloist)	Jonathan Butler	"Going Home"	Nominated	
1988	Best R&B Vocal Performance, Male	Jonathan Butler	"Lies"	Nominated	
1989	Best Traditional Folk Recording	Ladysmith Black Mambazo	Journey of Dreams	Nominated	

== 1990s ==
List of Grammy Award winners and nominees from 1990 to 1999
Year	Category	Nominee(s)	Work	Result	Ref.
1990	Best Musical Cast Show Album	Hugh Masekela	Sarafina! The Music of Liberation	Nominated	
1991	Best Recording for Children	Ladysmith Black Mambazo	How the Leopard Got His Spots	Nominated	
1991	Best Traditional Folk Recording	Ladysmith Black Mambazo	Classic Tracks	Nominated	
1994	Best World Music Album	Johnny Clegg and Savuka	Heat, Dust and Dreams	Nominated	
1995	Best Musical Show Album	Phil Ramone	Passion	Won	
1995	Best Traditional Folk Album	Ladysmith Black Mambazo	Liph' Iqiniso	Nominated	
1995	Best Instrumental Arrangement with Accompanying Vocals	Lebo Morake	"Circle of Life"	Won	
1996	Best Music Video, Short Form	Dave Matthews	"What Would You Say"	Nominated	
1996	Best Rock Performance by a Duo or Group with Vocal	Dave Matthews	"What Would You Say"	Nominated	
1997	Best Traditional Folk Album	Ladysmith Black Mambazo	Thuthukani Ngoxolo (Let's Develop in Peace)	Nominated	
1997	Best Musical Show Album	Phil Ramone	A Funny Thing Happened on the Way to the Forum	Nominated	
1997	Best Rock Performance by a Duo or Group with Vocal	Dave Matthews	"So Much to Say"	Won	
1997	Best Rock Album	Dave Matthews	Crash	Nominated	
1997	Best Rock Song	Dave Matthews	"Too Much"	Nominated	
1998	Best Rock Album	Kevin Shirley	Nine Lives	Nominated	
1998	Best Rock Performance by a Duo or Group with Vocal	Dave Matthews	"Crash Into Me"	Nominated	
1998	Best Rock Song	Dave Matthews	"Crash Into Me"	Nominated	
1999	Best Pop Performance by a Duo or Group with Vocal	Dave Matthews	"Crush"	Nominated	
1999	Best Rock Album	Dave Matthews	Before These Crowded Streets	Nominated	

== 2000s ==
List of Grammy Award winners and nominees from 2000 to 2009
Year	Category	Nominee(s)	Work	Result	Ref.
2000	Best Pop Collaboration with Vocals	Dave Matthews	"Love of My Life"	Nominated	
2001	Best Musical Show Album	Phil Ramone	The Wild Party	Nominated	
2001	Best World Music Album	Miriam Makeba	Homeland	Nominated	
2001	Best Traditional Folk Album	Ladysmith Black Mambazo	Live at the Royal Albert Hall	Nominated	
2002	Best Musical Show Album	Phil Ramone	Seussical: The Musical	Nominated	
2002	Best Rock Performance by a Duo or Group with Vocal	Dave Matthews	"The Space Between"	Nominated	
2003	Best Traditional Pop Vocal Album	Phil Ramone	Playin' with My Friends: Bennett Sings the Blues	Won	
2003	Best Pop Performance by a Duo or Group with Vocal	Dave Matthews	"Where Are You Going"	Nominated	
2004	Best Male Rock Vocal Performance	Dave Matthews	"Gravedigger"	Won	
2005	Best Surround Sound Album	Phil Ramone	Genius Loves Company	Won	
2005	Album of the Year	Phil Ramone	Genius Loves Company	Won	
2005	Best Musical Show Album	Phil Ramone	The Boy from Oz	Nominated	
2005	Best Traditional World Music Album	Ladysmith Black Mambazo	Raise Your Spirit Higher	Won	
2006	Best Traditional Pop Vocal Album	Phil Ramone	The Art of Romance	Won	
2006	Best Compilation Soundtrack Album for Motion Picture, Television or Other Visual Media	Phil Ramone	Beyond the Sea	Nominated	
2006	Best Contemporary World Music Album	Ladysmith Black Mambazo	No Boundaries	Nominated	
2007	Best Contemporary World Music Album	Ladysmith Black Mambazo	Long Walk to Freedom	Nominated	
2007	Best Traditional World Music Album	Soweto Gospel Choir	Blessed	Won	
2007	Best Traditional Pop Vocal Album	Phil Ramone	Duets: An American Classic	Won	
2008	Best Traditional World Music Album	Soweto Gospel Choir	African Spirit	Won	
2009	Best Traditional World Music Album	Ladysmith Black Mambazo	Ilembe: Honoring Shaka Zulu	Won	
2009	Best Contemporary World Music Album	Soweto Gospel Choir	Live at the Nelson Mandela Theater	Nominated	

== 2010s ==
List of Grammy Award winners and nominees from 2010 to 2019
Year	Category	Nominee(s)	Work	Result	Ref.
2010	Album of the Year	Dave Matthews	Big Whiskey and the GrooGrux King	Nominated	
2010	Best Rock Album	Dave Matthews	Big Whiskey and the GrooGrux King	Nominated	
2011	Best Rock Instrumental Performance	Dave Matthews	Kundalini Bonfire	Nominated	
2011	Best Traditional World Music Album	Soweto Gospel Choir	Grace	Nominated	
2012	Best Traditional Pop Vocal Album	Phil Ramone	Duets II	Won	
2012	Best Surround Sound Album	Phil Ramone	An Evening with Dave Grusin	Nominated	
2012	Best World Music Album	Ladysmith Black Mambazo	Songs from a Zulu Farm	Nominated	
2013	Best World Music Album	Hugh Masekela	Jabulani	Nominated	
2014	Best World Music Album	Ladysmith Black Mambazo	Live: Singing for Peace Around the World	Won	
2015	Best New Age Album	Wouter Kellerman	Winds of Samsara	Won	
2016	Best World Music Album	Ladysmith Black Mambazo	Music from Inala	Nominated	
2016	Best Contemporary Instrumental Album	Wouter Kellerman	Love Language	Nominated	
2016	Best Contemporary Christian Music Performance/Song	Brenton Brown	"Soul on Fire"	Nominated	
2016	Best Gospel Performance/Song	Neville Diedericks	"How Awesome Is Our God (Live)"	Nominated	
2017	Best World Music Album	Ladysmith Black Mambazo	Walking in the Footsteps of Our Fathers	Nominated	
2018	Best World Music Album	Ladysmith Black Mambazo	Shaka Zulu Revisited: 30th Anniversary Celebration	Won	
2018	Best Children's Album	Ladysmith Black Mambazo	Songs of Peace & Love for Kids & Parents Around the World	Nominated	
2019	Best World Music Album	Soweto Gospel Choir	Freedom	Won	

== 2020s ==
List of Grammy Award winners and nominees from 2020 to 2029
Year	Category	Nominee(s)	Work	Result	Ref.
2020	Best Comedy Album	Trevor Noah	Son of Patracia	Nominated	
2022	Best Dance/Electronic Album	Black Coffee	Subconsciously	Won	
2022	Best New Age Album	Wouter Kellerman	Pangaea	Nominated	
2023	Best Global Music Performance	Wouter Kellerman, Zakes Bantwini and Nomcebo Zikode	"Bayethe"	Won	(Note: References for Grammy Awards history of Zakes Bantwini, Nomcebo Zikode, and Wouter Kellerman)
2024	Best African Music Performance	Tyla	"Water"	Won	
2024	Best African Music Performance	Musa Keys	"Unavailable"	Nominated	
2024	Best Comedy Album	Trevor Noah	I Wish You Would	Nominated	
2025	Best New Age, Ambient, or Chant Album	Wouter Kellerman	Triveni	Won	
2025	Best Comedy Album	Trevor Noah	Where Was I	Nominated	
2025	Best Global Music Performance	Soweto Gospel Choir	"Sunlight to My Soul"	Nominated	
2026	Best African Music Performance	Tyla	"Push 2 Start"	Won	
2026	Best Audio Book, Narration and Storytelling Recording	Trevor Noah	Into the Uncut Grass	Nominated	
