= Ladysmith Black Mambazo Foundation =

The Ladysmith Black Mambazo Foundation was set up in January 1999 by Ladysmith Black Mambazo lead singer and founder Joseph Shabalala. The foundation teaches the history of South African music styles isicathamiya and, to a lesser extent, mbube.

== History ==
The foundation was started in January 1999, after many years of waiting. Joseph Shabalala, since the early 1990s, had been searching for an academy to teach young Zulu South African children about their traditional music and had tried on many occasions to get help from international corporations; on one of these many occasions, The Coca-Cola Company agreed to help Joseph with the foundation, but the deal ended abruptly.

Today, the foundation is currently in the midst of building The Mambazo Academy for South African Music and Culture, and plans for the building include a rehearsal hall, a teaching section and a recording studio. Through this, Joseph and the group have recorded fellow isicathamiya groups on disc.
