= Msizi Shabalala =

- Born: Msizi Innocent Shabalala; 1964 (age 61–62); Ladysmith, KwaZulu-Natal, South Africa
- Years active: 1993, 1998–present
- Member of: Ladysmith Black Mambazo

Msizi Innocent Shabalala (born 1964) is a member of Ladysmith Black Mambazo, a South African choral group founded in 1960 by his father Joseph Shabalala.

== Background ==
Msizi was born in Ladysmith (eMnambithi district), KwaZulu-Natal, to Joseph and his late wife Nellie Shabalala. In 1976, Joseph brought together his six sons to form Mshengu White Mambazo, Ladysmith's "junior choir", in which Msizi was a tenor voice.

After the murder of his uncle Headman Shabalala in December 1991 and the retirement of several other members (Inos Phungula, Geophrey Mdletshe and Ben Shabalala), Joseph later recruited Msizi and his brothers Sibongiseni, Thamsanqa and Thulani. Msizi is a tenor voice alongside Albert Mazibuko, and joined the group in 1993. However, he did not tour internationally with the group until 1998; between the years, Inos Phungula – a former member of the group – filled Msizi's place.
