= Ushaka =

Studio album by Ladysmith Black Mambazo
- Released: 1977
- Recorded: September 30, 1977
- Genre: Isicathamiya
- Length: 30:00 approx.
- Label: Gallo Record Company
- Producer: West Nkosi

Ladysmith Black Mambazo chronology
Phezulu Emafini (1977)	Ushaka (1977)	Indlela yaseZulwini (1978)

Ushaka is a 1977 album by the South African isicathamiya group Ladysmith Black Mambazo. The members who sang on the Ushaka album were: Ben Shabalala; Jockey Shabalala; Patrick Zondo; Jabulani Dubazana; Fikile Groonwell Khumalo; Funokwakhe Mazibuko; Milton Mazibuko; Albert Mazibuko; and Joseph Shabalala.

Dedicated to the late South African Chief Albert Luthuli, the album was nominated for two Grammy awards in 1996 and won Best Traditional Folk Album.

== Track listing ==
1. "Ushaka"
2. "Awu Wemadoda"
3. "Hamba Nhliziyo Yam"
4. "Intombi Mayiqoma"
5. "Ukuthula Zinsizwa"
6. "Lomhlaba Kawunoni"
7. "Ayilwanga"
8. "Zehla Entabeni"
9. "Ikhaya Lagangcwele"
10. "Yangiluma Inkukhu"
11. "Ngeke Ngiphinde"
12. "Iya Bhompa"
