= Mshengu =

Mshengu may refer to:

- Joseph Shabalala, the lead singer, founder and musical director of Ladysmith Black Mambazo
- Mshengu White Mambazo, a South African singing group spawned from Ladysmith Black Mambazo
