= Amaqhawe =

Studio album by Ladysmith Black Mambazo
- Released: 1976
- Recorded: May 1976
- Genre: Isicathamiya, Mbube
- Length: 50:00 approx.
- Label: Gallo Record Company
- Producer: West Nkosi

Ladysmith Black Mambazo chronology
Ukukhanya Kwelanga (1975)	Amaqhawe (1976)	Ukusindiswa (1977)

Amaqhawe was the 7th studio release by the South African isicathamiya group Ladysmith Black Mambazo. The album included songs such as "Ngi Boniseleni", which was later re-recorded (in 1987) as "Yibo Labo" ("These Are The Guys") on the album Shaka Zulu. Ben Shabalala Funokwakhe Mazibuko Abednego Mazibuko Headman Shabalala Enoch Shabalala Albert Mazibuko Milton Mazibuko Joseph Shabalala Russell Mthembu Fikile Groonwell Khumalo Jockey Shabalala Patrick Zondo Jabulani Dubazana

== Track listing ==
1. "Amaqhawe" ("Heroes")
2. "Sanibonani Maswati" ("We Greet You, Swaziland")
3. "Nansi Incwadi" ("Here is the Letter")
4. "Inkazimulo" ("Shining Star")
5. "Ngisele Ngedwa" ("I am left alone")
6. "Ngi Boniseleni" ("Show me")
7. "Ngiyekeleni" ("Leave me alone")
8. "Umhlab' Uyangilahla" ("The ground condemns me")
9. "Esilulwini" ("In the stomach")
10. "Amakhosi" ("Kings")
11. "Ntabamhlophe" ("White mountains")
12. "Eyami Intombi" ("My daughter")
