= Live at the Royal Albert Hall (Ladysmith Black Mambazo album) =

Live album by Ladysmith Black Mambazo
- Released: October 19, 1999
- Recorded: April 22, 1999
- Genre: Isicathamiya
- Label: Gallo Record Company
- Producer: Joseph Shabalala

Ladysmith Black Mambazo chronology
In Harmony (1999)	Live at the Royal Albert Hall (1999)	Lihl' Ixhiba Likagogo (2000)

Live at the Royal Albert Hall is a live album by the South African isicathamiya group Ladysmith Black Mambazo. It was recorded in front of a live audience on April 22, 1999, and released simultaneously on videotape and DVD. It was nominated at the 43rd Annual Grammy Awards in the Best Traditional Folk Album category.

== Track listing ==
1. "Introduction"
2. "Vulan' Amasango (Open the Gates)"
3. "Ngamthola (I Found)"
4. "Hello My Baby"
5. "Abadala"
6. "King of Kings" / "Abezizwe (Nations)"
7. "Wena Othanda"
8. "Inkanyezi Nezazi (The Star and the Wiseman)"
9. "Ngothandaza Njalo (I Will Keep On Praying)"
10. "Rain, Rain, Beautiful Rain"
11. "Phansi Emgodini (Down in the Mines)"
12. "Homeless"

== See also ==
- Mango Groove: Live in Concert (2011)
