= Always with Us =

2014 studio album by Ladysmith Black Mambazo

Always With Us

Studio album by Ladysmith Black Mambazo
- Released: January 15, 2014
- Recorded: 2000,10-2012 KZM Music House in Durban, Club Shmed in Missoula and East Hall in Arkansas while touring
- Length: 35:00
- Label: Ladysmith Black Mambazo
- Producers: Mitch Goldstein; Martin Walters; Joseph Shabalala; Ladysmith Black Mambazo

Ladysmith Black Mambazo chronology
Live: Singing For Peace Around The World (2013)	Always With Us (2014)	Music from Inala A Zulu Ballet (2014)

Always With Us is a 2014 album by the South African isicathamiya group Ladysmith Black Mambazo. The album, released on 15 January 2014, is a tribute to the life of the group's matriarch Nellie Shabalala (1953–2002), the late wife of Mambazo leader Joseph Shabalala. It is also only the second album in the group's 50-year career to feature female Zulu vocalists singing alongside the male members.

== Background ==
Joseph Shabalala was married to Nellie for thirty years. During that time, Nellie became a supportive matriarch of her husband's group Ladysmith Black Mambazo. In 1976, the Shabalalas became Christians and joined the Church of God of Prophecy. Nellie began singing with other female churchgoers and eventually formed her own choir, which she later named Women of Mambazo.

In early 2000, Nellie and Women of Mambazo made their first studio album in a South African recording studio. In October 2001, Women of Mambazo supported Ladysmith Black Mambazo on a 30-date tour of the United Kingdom. In May 2002, before Women of Mambazo could build a name for itself, Nellie was brutally murdered by a masked gunman, and the recordings of Zulu church music that she had made with her group in the studio in 2000 remained unreleased for many years.

== Production ==
The members of Ladysmith Black Mambazo had long desired to create a lasting memorial to Nellie's memory. In 2010, the opportunity finally arose and the group decided to mix together their own voices with the unreleased recordings Nellie made with Women of Mambazo in 2000. Work on the album project began in 2010, but it became technically very difficult to mix Mambazo's newly recorded vocals with Nellie's archive recordings in a seamless manner. As a result, the album took three years to complete. Upon its eventual release in early 2014, Always With Us garnered positive reviews, noting a "bittersweet" and "emotional" nature to the album's ten songs.

== Track listing ==
1. "Usasheba" - 3:37
2. "Wozanawe" - 3:46
3. "Izembe Mfana" - 3:06
4. "Nginomhlobo" - 3:18
5. "Fikile" - 3:14
6. "Amen" - 3:42
7. "Nant' Ivangeli" - 3:55
8. "Mamizolo" - 3:25
9. "Yimalapha" - 3:34
10. "No More Sorrow" - 3:30

== Personnel ==
Details on the participants on Always With Us are from the album's liner notes.

=== Ladysmith Black Mambazo ===
- Joseph Shabalala
- Albert Mazibuko
- Russel Mthembu
- Abednego Mazibuko
- Thulani Shabalala
- Sibongiseni Shabalala
- Thamsanqa Shabalala
- Msizi Shabalala
- Mfanafuthi Dlamini

=== Women of Mambazo ===
- Nellie Shabalala
- Sindi Shabalala
- Grammer Shezi
- Busisiwe Dlamini
- Theni Shabalala
- Mumsie Ngcobo
- Ntombintombi Kunene
- Funokwakhe Mnguni
- Bheki Hlabisa
- Mfanufikile Zungu
- Thokozani Mchunu

=== Technical personnel ===
- Joseph Shabalala - composer
- Mitch Goldstein and Martin Walters - production
- Joseph Shabalala and Ladysmith Black Mambazo - executive production
- Martin Walters - engineering, mixing and mastering
- Lulis Leal - photography
- John Huelbig - design
