= Halala =

Halala may refer to:

- one hundredth of a Saudi Riyal
- Halala USA, a non-profit for Luhya people
- Faustinopolis, an ancient city in Cappadocia
- Nikah Halala, a type of Muslim marriage before a divorced woman can remarry her former husband
- The offspring of a kohen with certain of the women he is forbidden to marry.

== See also ==
- "Halala South Africa" (Congratulations South Africa), a song on the Lihl' Ixhiba Likagogo album
- Drakula halála, the original name of the 1923 film Dracula's Death
