= Headman Shabalala =

South African musician

- Born: 10 October 1945
- Died: 10 December 1991 (aged 46)
- Instrument: Formerly bass member
- Years active: 1960–1991
- Formerly of: Ladysmith Black Mambazo

Headman Msongelwa Shabalala (10 October 1945 – 10 December 1991) was a member of Ladysmith Black Mambazo, a South African choral group founded by his brother Joseph.

Headman was born in Ladysmith, in the eMnambithi area and grew up with his brothers Joseph, Jockey, Enoch, Makhosini and Ben. In 1960, he joined the first incarnation of his brother Joseph's group and became a full-time member alongside his brother Enoch and various cousins and relatives. Singing as a bass voice, Headman added sounds to the songs that would become synonymous with the group's rhythm; the low gruffs and growls and the "clicking" noises (today, they are sounded by Russel Mthembu and Sibongiseni Shabalala, respectively).

By the mid-1980s, the line-up had changed rapidly and Headman, along with his brother Joseph and cousin Albert Mazibuko, were the only original members from the 1960s.

By the start of the 1990s, Ladysmith Black Mambazo had become famous across the world. On 10 December 1991, while driving home from a family gathering in KwaZulu-Natal, Headman was shot and killed by a white, off-duty security guard in an apparent racially motivated killing.

Headman's murder is referenced in the song "Worldwide" by the group Adam Again on their album Dig.
