= Shintsha Sithothobala =

Studio album by Ladysmith Black Mambazo
- Released: 1975
- Recorded: 1975
- Genre: Isicathamiya, Mbube
- Length: 50:00 approx.
- Label: Gallo Record Company
- Producer: West Nkosi

Ladysmith Black Mambazo chronology
Ukusindiswa (1975)	Shintsha Sithothobala (1975)	Phezulu Emafini (1976)

Shintsha Sithothobala is the sixth studio release by the South African isicathamiya group Ladysmith Black Mambazo. Shintsha Sithothobala, released in 1975 unlike most of the output of the group by this time, does not include any directly Zulu Christian religious songs. The album's songs instead are based on Zulu tradition.

== Track listing ==
1. "Shintsha Sithothobala"
2. "Mawufunungenzenje"
3. "Kudala Ngizula"
4. "Bantu Radio"
5. "Makoti"
6. "Yinhle Lentombi" ("That Lady is Beautiful")
7. "Ziyangibiza"
8. "Amalanda"
9. "Sicelumshado" ("We Request a Wedding")
10. "Ibhubesi" ("The Lion")
11. "Baleka Mfana" ("Run, Boy!")
12. "Zangihlek'intombi"
