= Two Worlds One Heart =

Studio album by Ladysmith Black Mambazo
- Released: 1990
- Genre: Isicathamiya
- Label: Warner Bros.

Ladysmith Black Mambazo chronology
Journey of Dreams (1988)	Two Worlds One Heart (1990)	Classic Tracks (1990)

Two Worlds One Heart is an album by the South African choral group Ladysmith Black Mambazo, released in 1990. The first single was "Township Jive", which the group had performed on the Graceland tour.

The album peaked at No. 2 on Billboard's World Albums chart. The group supported the album with a North American tour.

== Production ==
Several songs contain instrumental backing, a first for a Ladysmith album. Ray Phiri wrote two of the album's songs. Marvin Winans produced "Leaning on the Everlasting Arm", on which the Winans sang; group leader Joseph Shabalala was inspired to record the song after hearing Sweet Honey in the Rock. George Clinton cowrote and produced "Scatter the Fire". Anton Fig played drums on the album.

== Critical reception ==
Professional ratings
Review scores
Source	Rating
AllMusic	3/5 stars
Calgary Herald	B
Chicago Tribune	3/4 stars
Robert Christgau	A−
The Encyclopedia of Popular Music	4/5 stars
Los Angeles Times	3.5/5 stars
MusicHound World: The Essential Album Guide	3/5 stars
Orlando Sentinel	5/5 stars
Ottawa Citizen	4/5 stars
The Rolling Stone Album Guide	4/5 stars

Robert Christgau wrote that Shabalala "has the lineaments of a pop visionary, and here he arrives at a crossover that does the style proud, moving gracefully from Zulu to English within and between songs and pumping the a cappella rhythms with instruments on three cuts." The Austin American-Statesman concluded that "the most intriguing musical meeting of minds ... is undoubtedly 'Scatter the Fire', a song that melds Zulu dance and American mutant funk."

The Calgary Herald deemed the album "another haunting collection of spirituals, ballads, and Zulu traditionals." The Los Angeles Times determined that "much of LBM's music is based on hypnotic, not-quite-mainstream-sounding harmonies sung by voices so beautiful as to be not quite of this world... No one is making music more heartfelt than this." The Houston Chronicle praised the "dreamlike, a cappella harmonies and uplifting messages of faith and hope."

AllMusic wrote that "this is one of the most ambitious albums Ladysmith has ever done, and its risk-taking pays off handsomely."

== Track listing ==
No.	Title	Length
1.	"Township Jive"	4:40
2.	"Ofana Naye (Nobody Like Him)"	4:51
3.	"Bala Ubhale (Count and Write)"	4:14
4.	"Love Your Neighbor"	4:02
5.	"Leaning on the Everlasting Arm"	4:53
6.	"Rejoice"	4:02
7.	"Hayi Ngalesiskhathi (Not Right Now)"	4:10
8.	"Emhlabeni (In This World)"	3:44
9.	"Isikhathi Siyimali (Time Is Money)"	3:35
10.	"Nami Ngaze Ngamthola (I Found Him)"	3:43
11.	"Ngomnyango (By the Door)"	1:51
12.	"Scatter the Fire"	3:22
13.	"Cothoza Mfana (Tip Toes Guy)"	1:17
