= Journey of Dreams =

Journey of Dreams may refer to:

- Nights: Journey of Dreams, a video game by Sega Studio USA
- Journey of Dreams (album), an album by Ladysmith Black Mambazo
