= World in Union =

Theme for the Rugby World Cup

"World in Union" is a theme song for the Rugby World Cup. The song's lyrics are by Charlie Skarbek, set to the melody "Thaxted" by Gustav Holst.

Skarbek was commissioned to write the song by World Rugby (then the International Rugby Football Board) for the 1991 Rugby World Cup, held in England, Scotland, Wales, Ireland and France. It was first performed by New Zealand soprano Kiri Te Kanawa, and has since been performed and recorded by various other musicians.

The song's melody, "Thaxted", was originally written in 1914 as the middle section of "Jupiter, the Bringer of Jollity", a movement from Holst's orchestral suite The Planets. Although the melody was originally wordless, it was later adapted as a hymn tune by Holst for its use in the 1921 British/Anglican patriotic hymn, "I Vow to Thee, My Country", using words by Sir Cecil Spring Rice. The melody has subsequently been paired with numerous other religious texts and secular lyrics.

== Kiri Te Kanawa version ==
"World in Union"

Single by Kiri Te Kanawa
- Released: 16 September 1991
- Genre: Opera, classical
- Length: 3:58
- Label: Columbia
- Songwriters: Gustav Holst, Charlie Skarbek
- Producer: Charlie Skarbek

Kiri Te Kanawa recorded the first version of this song for the 1991 Rugby World Cup. Her version peaked at No. 4 on the UK Singles Chart, No. 5 in Ireland, and No. 10 in New Zealand.

=== Charts ===
==== Weekly charts ====
Chart (1991)	Peak position
Europe (Eurochart Hot 100)	4
Ireland (IRMA)	5
Luxembourg (Radio Luxembourg)	16
New Zealand (Recorded Music NZ)	10
UK Singles (Official Charts)	4
UK Airplay (Music Week)	52

==== Year-end charts ====
Chart (1991)	Position
UK Singles (OCC)	28

== Ladysmith Black Mambazo ft. PJ Powers version ==
"World in Union 95"

Single by Ladysmith Black Mambazo ft. P.J. Powers
- Recorded: 1995
- Genre: Classical crossover, pop, isicathamiya, mbube
- Length: 3.49
- Label: PolyGram (UK)
- Songwriters: Gustav Holst, Charlie Skarbek

For the 1995 Rugby World Cup a version of the song was recorded by Ladysmith Black Mambazo featuring PJ Powers.

== Shirley Bassey and Bryn Terfel version ==
"World in Union"

Single by Shirley Bassey and Bryn Terfel

from the album Land of My Fathers
- Released: 11 October 1999
- Recorded: 1999
- Genre: Classical crossover
- Length: 3.45
- Label: Decca
- Songwriters: Gustav Holst, Charlie Skarbek
- Producer: Charlie Skarbek

Shirley Bassey and Bryn Terfel released a version of the song on 11 October 1999. It was performed live by both artists at the opening ceremony of the 1999 Rugby World Cup on 1 October 1999, with Bassey wearing a gown designed on the Welsh flag. Three versions are featured on the single: a duet with Bassey and Terfel, Bassey's solo version and a version which features the choirs only. The duet version is performed partially in Welsh by Terfel. The official video was filmed at the Millennium Stadium, Cardiff and features various other Welsh landscapes. The single reached No. 35 on the UK Singles Chart in October 1999.

UK 3 track maxi CD single

1. "World in Union" (Duet: Bryn Terfel and Shirley Bassey) – 3:42
2. "World in Union" (Shirley Bassey) – 3:45
3. "World in Union" (Welsh Mountain Mix) – 3:45

Personnel

- Shirley Bassey – vocal (tracks 1 and 2)
- Bryn Terfel – vocal (track 1)
- The Black Mountain Male Chorus – choir (all tracks)
- The Morriston Rugby Club Choir – choir (all tracks)
- Robert Fardell and Charlie Skarbek – backing singers (track 2)
- The City of Prague Philharmonic Orchestra – orchestra
- Llio Rhydderch – Welsh triple harp
- Troy Donockley – uilleann pipes
- David Thomas – drums
- Simon Hale – orchestral arrangements
- Tim Rhys-Evans and D. Huw Rees – choral arrangements

== Hayley Westenra version ==
"World in Union"

Single by Hayley Westenra

from the album World in Union: Rugby World Cup 2011 – The Official Album
- Released: 26 August 2011
- Recorded: 2011
- Genre: Classical crossover, pop
- Length: 3.20
- Label: Decca
- Songwriters: Gustav Holst, Charlie Skarbek

The official album of the 2011 Rugby World Cup in New Zealand was launched on 9 August by New Zealand soprano Hayley Westenra. It was released by Universal Music on 26 August, and included 22 tracks recorded by classical artists. Westenra not only recorded the song in English and Māori, as heard on this album, but also in French, Italian, and Japanese. It reached the No. 1 position on the Classical Compilation Albums Chart of Official Charts as well as the Classic FM chart after its release in the UK.

Track listing

1. World in Union – Hayley Westenra
2. Swing Low '99 – Arr. C. Skarbek/ T.R. Evans – Russell Watson, Royal Choral Society
3. Land of My Fathers – Fron Male Voice Choir
4. Ireland's Call – Brian Kennedy, Paul Byrom
5. Scottish Medley – Royal Scots Dragoon Guards
6. Jerusalem – The Coldstream Guards Band, Alfie Boe
7. Glorious – Mary-Jess
8. Now's the Time – Luigi Corvi
9. Calon Lân – Katherine Jenkins
10. O Verona – Only Men Aloud
11. Pōkarekare Ana – Hayley Westenra, Francois Rive, Robbie McIntosh, Metro Voices, Te Tau Choir, Jenny O'Grady, Royal Philharmonic Orchestra, Ian Dean
12. Waltzing Matilda – André Rieu, Mirusia Louwerse
13. We'll Keep a Welcome – Bryn Terfel, Orchestra of the Welsh National Opera, Gareth Jones, The Black Mountain Choir, The Risca Choir
14. Nkosi Sikelel' iAfrika – Kenyan Boys Choir
15. Men of Harlech – Fron Male Voice Choir
16. God Defend New Zealand – Hayley Westenra
17. The Fields of Athenry – Máiréad Carlin
18. Cwm Rhondda – Bryn Terfel, Orchestra of the Welsh National Opera, Gareth Jones, The Black Mountain Choir, The Risca Choir
19. La Marseillaise – Roberto Alagna
20. Swing Low – All Angels
21. World in Union (English / Māori) – Hayley Westenra
22. Kakari (Haka 2011) – Qube

== Paloma Faith version ==
"World in Union"

Single by Paloma Faith
- Released: 2015
- Genre: Power pop
- Label: Sony
- Songwriters: Gustav Holst, Charlie Skarbek

R&B singer Paloma Faith was selected to record the song as the official 2015 Rugby World Cup anthem. Her rendition of the song was used on ITV's Rugby World Cup coverage in the opening titles and during advert breaks, a decision that was greeted negatively by some viewers. A petition to have the song removed was set up by viral marketing expert Jonathan Wilson and received over 10,000 signatures. The petition was featured on the front page of UK newspaper The Daily Telegraph.

== Kiyoe Yoshioka version ==
For the 2019 Rugby World Cup, the song was recorded by Japanese singer Kiyoe Yoshioka. This was also included on her debut solo album Utairo.

ITV used a version recorded by Emeli Sandé for their 2019 World Cup coverage.

== Ndlovu Youth Choir version ==
"World in Union"

Single by Ndlovu Youth Chior
- Released: 2023
- Label: Simco Limited under exclusive license to Sony Music Entertainment Africa (Pty) Ltd

On 8 September 2023, the Ndlovu Youth Choir released their version of World in Union for the 2023 Rugby World Cup. The track is a single off their upcoming album Celebrate.

== Invictus ==
"World in Union" features in the film Invictus which is based on the events surrounding the 1995 Rugby World Cup in South Africa.
