= No Boundaries (Ladysmith Black Mambazo album) =

Studio album by Ladysmith Black Mambazo
- Released: 25 January 2005
- Recorded: August 2004 ZK matthews hall Pretoria
- Genre: Isicathamiya/Classical
- Length: 60:01
- Label: Headsup International
- Producer: Joseph Shabalala

Ladysmith Black Mambazo chronology
The Very Best of - Rain, Rain Beautiful Rain (2004)	No Boundaries (2005)	Long Walk to Freedom (2006)

Professional ratings
Review scores
Source	Rating
AllMusic	3.5/5 stars
Songlines	1/5 stars

No Boundaries is a 2005 album by the South African isicathamiya group Ladysmith Black Mambazo and the English Chamber Orchestra. It was released on 25 January 2006 and featured many Western classical tracks composed by Mozart and Bach ("Jesu, Joy of Man's Desiring", "Ave Verum Corpus", "Dona Nobis Pacem") as well as Joseph Shabalala originals ("Homeless", composed with Paul Simon; "Jabulani"; "Lifikile Ivangeli").

As well as a standard CD release (HUCD 3092), the album was also released in a Hybrid SACD version (HUSA 9192).

== Track listing ==
1. "Jabulani - Rejoice"
2. "Homeless"
3. "Awu Wemadoda"
4. "Amazing Grace"
5. "Dona Nobis Pacem"
6. "Ngingenwe Emoyeni (Wind of the Spirit of God)"
7. "Umzuzu Nay' Ujesu"
8. "Jesu, Joy of Man's Desiring"
9. "Sanctus (Heilig, Heilig, Heilig)"
10. "Ave Verum Corpus"
11. "Lifikile Ivangeli"
12. "Walil' Umntwana (The Child is Crying)"
