= Induku Zethu =

Studio album by Ladysmith Black Mambazo
- Released: March 3, 1983
- Recorded: 1983
- Genre: Isicathamiya
- Length: 35:00 approx.
- Label: Gallo Record Company
- Producer: West Nkosi

Ladysmith Black Mambazo chronology
Umthombo Wamanzi (1982)	Induku Zethu (1983)	Ibhayibheli Liyindlela (1984)

Professional ratings
Review scores
Source	Rating
AllMusic	3/5 stars
Robert Christgau	A−
The Encyclopedia of Popular Music	3/5 stars
The Rolling Stone Album Guide	3.5/5 stars

Induku Zethu is an album by the South African isicathamiya group Ladysmith Black Mambazo. The album (#BL 393) shows the group on the front cover photograph wearing traditional Zulu attire, with lead singer and founder Joseph Shabalala out front brandishing a spear (the album's title translated into English is "Our Fighting Sticks"). The album was released in 1983, and reissued internationally in 1984 by Shanachie Records.

== Critical reception ==
Robert Christgau called the album "serious, intricate, droll, eerie, precisely rehearsed, and very beautiful." The Los Angeles Times wrote that "the octet's rich vocal blend focuses on deep unison harmonies that soothe more than evoke the call-and-response release of American gospel."

== Track listing ==
1. "Mangosuthu"
2. "Induku Zethu" (Our Fighting Sticks)
3. "Vukani" (Wake Up)
4. "Kubi Ukungalaleli"
5. "Ithemba Lakho" (Your Hope)
6. "Isono Sami Sentombi"
7. "Ingwe Idla Ngamabala" (A Leopard Is Recognisable By Its Spots)
8. "Umzalwane" (Brother)
9. "Ifa Lobukhosana"
10. "Wayibamba Mfana"
11. "Watatazela" (You're In A Hurry)
12. "Bakhuphuk' Izwe Lonke" (They Went Up To The Country)
