= Mbube =

Mbube may refer to:

- "Mbube" (song), a Zulu song composed by Solomon Linda
- Mbube (genre), a South African singing style named after the song
