= My Dream – African Sounds =

Studio album by Ladysmith Black Mambazo & SABC Choir
- Released: 30 September 2008
- Recorded: 2007–2008
- Genre: Isicathamiya/choral music
- Length: 41:30
- Label: Gallo Record Company
- Producer: Joseph Shabalala, Thulasizwe Nkabinde

Ladysmith Black Mambazo & SABC Choir chronology
Ilembe: Honoring Shaka Zulu (2008)	My Dream – African Sounds (2008)	Kobuye Kulunge (2010)

My Dream – African Sounds is a 2008 release by the South African groups Ladysmith Black Mambazo and the SABC Choir. It was released on 30 September 2008. The album is a collaboration of both isicathamiya and choral music.

My Dream – African Sounds features songs composed by Mambazo founder, lead singer, and director Joseph Shabalala, and leader of the SABC Choir Thulasizwe Nkabinde. Original Mambazo songs (such as "Iqome Kanjani", "Shintsha Sithothobala", and "Angimboni Ofana Naye") as well as SABC Choir standards (like "Plea for Africa", "Uhembelinye", and "Buya Lindiwe") are included on the album, which melds both Zulu vocal music (isicathamiya) – made famous by Mambazo – and gospel choral musics by having both groups sing each song together. The one exception is "Okuhle Hle", sung entirely by Mambazo.

The album came together when Mambazo were on tour in the US in March 2007; South African Broadcasting Corporation executive Joyce Dube saw the group in a New York City performance and approached them with the idea of recording a gospel/traditional album with the SABC Choir. Arrangements were made, and the album began to come together a year later in the South African Downtown Studios.

== Track listing ==
1. "Okuhle Hle" (composer: Joseph Shabalala)
2. "Uhembelinye" (Thulasizwe Nkabinde)
3. "Buya Lindiwe" (Thulasizwe Nkabinde)
4. "Emarabini" (Thulasizwe Nkabinde)
5. "Iqome Kanjani" (Joseph Shabalala)
6. "Plea for Africa" (traditional / arranged by Thulasizwe Nkabinde)
7. "Eduze neNkosi" (Joseph Shabalala)
8. "Angimboni Ofana Naye" (Joseph Shabalala)
9. "Shintsha Sithothobala" (Joseph Shabalala)
10. "Kungawo Amandla" (traditional / arranged by Thulasizwe Nkabinde)
