= Phezulu Emafini =

Studio album by Ladysmith Black Mambazo
- Released: 1976
- Recorded: 1976
- Genre: Isicathamiya
- Length: 30:00 approx.
- Label: Gallo Record Company
- Producer: West Nkosi

Ladysmith Black Mambazo chronology
Shintsha Sithothobala 1975 (1975)	Phezulu Emafini (1976)	Ushaka (1977)

Phezulu Emafini, a Zulu phrase meaning high in the clouds, was the 8th studio release by the South African isicathamiya group Ladysmith Black Mambazo. The album, released in 1976, is composed entirely of Zulu Christian religious compositions by composer, director, and lead singer Joseph Shabalala.

== Track listing ==
1. "Esiphambanweni" on the cross
2. "Limnandi Ivangeli" the gospel is wonderful
3. "Nkosi Sihlangene" Lord we are united
4. "Phezulu Enkosini" up in the Lord
5. "Enimkuzeni" in him
6. "Thuma Umlilo Ongcwele" send the Holy fire
7. "Phakamisa Amehlo" lift up your eyes
8. "Kanye Nawe Nkosi Yami" and with you my lord
9. "Uthando Lukababa" father's love
10. "Yith' Umlilo Ovuthayo" its a burning fire
