= Amabutho =

Studio album by Ladysmith Black Mambazo
- Released: February 22, 1973
- Recorded: August 1972–January 1973
- Genre: Isicathamiya, Mbube
- Length: 35:00 approx.
- Label: Gallo Record Company
- Producer: West Nkosi

Ladysmith Black Mambazo chronology
Amabutho (1973)	Imbongi (1973)

Professional ratings
Review scores
Source	Rating
The Encyclopedia of Popular Music	3/5 stars

Amabutho is the first album by the South African isicathamiya group Ladysmith Black Mambazo. It was released in 1973 by Gallo Record Company. Amabutho was the first record by black musicians in the country to receive gold disc certification (25,000 copies). It contains the hit single "Nomathemba". The LP was reissued on Gallo (in South Africa only) along with most of the group's early output, in February 2007. The members who sang on the Amabutho album were Milton Mazibuko, Ngali Mazibuko, Joseph Shabalala, Headman Shabalala, Enoch Shabalala, Albert Mazibuko and Walter Malinga

== Track listing ==
1. "Amabutho" (Warriors)
2. "Isigcino" (The End)
3. "Yadla Yabeletha" (It Eats Often)
4. "Awu, Wemadoda" (Hey, Man!)
5. "Mlaba" Thanks
6. "Ushaka" (King Shaka)
7. "Nomathemba" (Hope)
8. "Nqonqotha Mfana" (The Boy Knocks)
9. " Sivuya Sonke we perform everywhere
10. Nkosi Yamakhosi Kings of Kings /Lord of Lords
11. " Utugela the tugela River
12. "Ngelekelele" help me
