= Umthombo Wamanzi =

Studio album by Ladysmith Black Mambazo
- Released: June 1982
- Recorded: May 1982
- Genre: Isicathamiya
- Length: 35:00 approx.
- Label: Gallo Record Company
- Producer: West Nkosi

Ladysmith Black Mambazo chronology
| Phansi Emgodini (1981) | Umthombo Wamanzi (1982) | Induku Zethu (1983) |

Professional ratings
Review scores
| Source | Rating |
|---|---|
| AllMusic | 3/5 stars |
| Robert Christgau | B+ |
| The Encyclopedia of Popular Music | 3/5 stars |
| The Rolling Stone Album Guide | 3/5 stars |

Umthombo Wamanzi is an album by the South African isicathamiya group Ladysmith Black Mambazo. The album (#BL 353) was recorded in May 1982, and released the next month. Whilst the group's previous output had been, for the most part, entirely composed by lead singer and founder Joseph Shabalala, Umthombo Wamanzi contained primarily traditional Zulu hymns re-arranged by Shabalala, such as "Uzube Nami Baba" and "Ungikhumbule". The members who sang in the Umthombo Wamanzi album were Abednego Mazibuko Jockey Shabalala Albert Mazibuko Jabulani Dubazana Headman Shabalala Fikile Groonwell Khumalo Russell Mthembu Joseph Shabalala.

The album was rereleased by Shanachie Records in 1988.

== Critical reception ==
AllMusic wrote that "Shabalala and his bandmates provide a stunning look at some relatively simple lyrical works that are ornamented through their harmonic work to become a cappella masterpieces." The Richmond Times-Dispatch wrote that "a lot of these tunes have the sturdy Calvinist determination to have come out of some Protestant missionary hymnbook, but what Shabalala and his voices do with their phrases and rhythms gives earnest zeal an ecstatic tingle."

== Track listing ==
1. "Uzube Nami Baba" father in your name
2. "Ungikhumbule" (You Remember Me)
3. "Emafini" (In The Clouds)
4. "Yimani" be of good courage
5. "Igazi Lemihlatshelo" (The Blood Of Sacrifices)
6. "Uthando" (Love)
7. "Siligugu Isiphambano" (The Cross Is Precious)
8. "Baba Wethu" (Our Father)
9. "Siyawadinga Amandla" (We Need Strength, Lord)
10. "Inhliziyo Zethu" (Our Hearts)
11. "Halleluya"
12. "Abantu Bayahluleka" (The People Will Conquer)
