= Mwelase =

Mwelase is a surname. Notable people with the surname include:

- Bongani Mwelase (born 1982), South African boxer
- Jabulani Frederick Mwelase Dubazana (born 1954), South African singer
