= Ibhayibheli Liyindlela =

Studio album by Ladysmith Black Mambazo
- Released: March 26, 1984
- Recorded: March 7, 1984
- Genre: Isicathamiya
- Length: 35:00 approx.
- Label: Gallo Record Company
- Producer: West Nkosi

Ladysmith Black Mambazo chronology
Induku Zethu (1983)	Ibhayibheli Liyindlela (1984)	Inkazimulo (1985)

Ibhayibheli Liyindlela is an album by the South African isicathamiya group Ladysmith Black Mambazo. It was released in 1984 and was a religious release focusing on songs such as "Ujesu Wami" ("My Jesus") and "Ibhayibheli Lami" ("My Bible"). The album (#BL 472) was recorded on March 7, 1984, and released on March 26 of that year. The members who sang in the Ibhayibheli Liyindlela album were Albert Mazibuko Funokwakhe Mazibuko Ben Shabalala Jockey Shabalala Fikile Groonwell Khumalo Abednego Mazibuko Joseph Shabalala Milton Mazibuko Headman Shabalala Patrick Zondo Russell Mthembu Jabulani Dubazana

== Track listing ==
1. "Kuzohlatshelelwa" (There will be singing)
2. "Ibhayibheli Lami" ("My Bible")
3. "Umthombo Wegazi" ("The Well of Blood")
4. "Ngeke Ngiphinde" (“I Will Never Again”)
5. "Ujesu Wami" ("My Jesus")
6. "Hlangabeza Ujesu" (“Meet Jesus Halfway”)
7. "Ivangeli Labasha"
8. "Waktazulwa"
9. "Khaya Lami" ("My Home")
10. "Vul' Inhliziyo" (“Open Your Heart”)
11. "Inyanga Enkulu"
12. "Igama Elinje" (“Such A Name”)
