= Phansi Emgodini =

Studio album by Ladysmith Black Mambazo
- Released: 9 September 1981
- Recorded: 17 August 1981
- Genre: Isicathamiya
- Length: 35:00 approx.
- Label: Gallo Record Company
- Producer: West Nkosi

Ladysmith Black Mambazo chronology
Ulwandle Oluncgwele (1981)	Phansi Emgodini (1981)	Umthombo Wamanzi (1982)

Phansi Emgodini ("Down in the mine") is the 15th album by the South African isicathamiya group Ladysmith Black Mambazo. The album (#BL 321) was recorded on 17 August 1981 and released on 9 September that year. The album also featured the group's first German-language song, "Wir Grüssen Euch Alle" ("We Greet You All") following their successful tour of Cologne, Germany.

== Track listing ==
1. "Nansi Imali" ("Here Is The Money")
2. "Saziwa Izwe Lonke"
3. "Hamba Angikhathali"
4. "Shukuma Ntombi"
5. "Khwishi Khwishi" ("Spit, Spit")
6. "Sawela Ulwandle" ("Over The Sea")
7. "Ukhulumelani?"
8. "Wemhlaba Uzodela"
9. "Wena Ntombi Uyasidumaza"
10. "Uzenzile Akakhalelwa"
11. "Nansi Indaba Sondelani"
12. "Wir Grüssen Euch Alle / Sanibonani Nonke"
