= Ezinkulu =

Studio album by Ladysmith Black Mambazo
- Released: 1979
- Recorded: April 19, 1979
- Genre: Isicathamiya
- Length: 35:00 approx.
- Label: Gallo Record Company
- Producer: West Nkosi

Ladysmith Black Mambazo chronology
Indlela yaseZulwini (1978)	Ezinkulu (1979)	Intokozo (1980)

Ezinkulu is an album by the South African isicathamiya group Ladysmith Black Mambazo. The album featured songs included "How Long Should I Wait" and "Hello My Baby", the first English-language songs sung by the group. The album (#BL 186) was released later on 28 May 1979.

== Track listing ==
1. "Bamnqobile"
2. "Hello My Baby"
3. "Siyakhanya Isibane"
4. "Woza Sambe"
5. "Hamishaweta"
6. "Amafutha Esibane"
7. "Jubilee"
8. "How Long Should I Wait"
9. "Bayasithanda"
10. "We Dudu We Themba Lami"
11. "Bhayi Bhayi Lindiwe"
12. "Kura Gazankulu"
