= Indlela yaseZulwini =

Studio album by Ladysmith Black Mambazo
- Released: 1978
- Recorded: August 21, 1978
- Genre: Isicathamiya
- Length: 35:00 approx.
- Label: Gallo Record Company
- Producer: West Nkosi

Ladysmith Black Mambazo chronology
Ushaka (1977)	Indlela yaseZulwini (1978)	Ezinkulu (1979)

Indlela yaseZulwini is an album by the South African isicathamiya group Ladysmith Black Mambazo. The album featured religious songs including "Uma Ngingena Esontweni" and "Wozani Ku Jesu" ("Come Closer to Jesus"). Indlela yaseZulwini (#BL 153) was recorded on August 21, 1978, and released later that month.

== Track listing ==
1. "Wozani Ku Jesu" ("Come Closer To Jesus")
2. "Uligugu Lami" ("My Precious")
3. "Woza Moni". ("Come On In Take a Look")
4. "Izwi" ("The Voice")
5. "Uma Ngingena Esontweni" ("When You Go To Church")
6. "Kukhona Zonkizinto" ("There Are All Sorts of Things")
7. "Safa Thina" ("We Died")
8. "Igama Lenkosi" ("The Name of the King")
9. "Intando Ka Thixo" ("God's Will")
10. "Thatha Konke" ("Take It All")
11. "Woza Sambe" ("Come On Let's Go")
12. "Ngiyamthanda Ujesu" (I Love Jesus")
