= Ulwandle Oluncgwele =

Studio album by Ladysmith Black Mambazo
- Released: 1977
- Genre: Isicathamiya
- Length: 35:00 approx.
- Label: Gallo Record Company
- Producer: West Nkosi

Ladysmith Black Mambazo chronology
Ulwandle Oluncgwele (1977)	Phansi Emgodini (1981)

Professional ratings
Review scores
Source	Rating
AllMusic	4.5/5 stars
Robert Christgau	A−
The Encyclopedia of Popular Music	3/5 stars
The Rolling Stone Album Guide	3.5/5 stars

Ulwandle Oluncgwele is an album by the South African isicathamiya group Ladysmith Black Mambazo, released in 1985 . It was rereleased by Shanachie Records in 1985.

== Critical reception ==
AllMusic wrote that "the style is such a stunning display of virtuosity in its own way that one can hardly help but to enjoy the album."

== Track listing ==
1. "Izithembiso Zenkosi"
2. "Limnandi Izulu"
3. "Ulwandle Oluncgwele"
4. "Sishumayel' Ivangeli"
5. "Siphum' Emnqamlezweni"
6. "Nkosi Yami Ngabusiswa"
7. "Ayanqikaza Amagwala"
8. "Baba No Mama"
9. "Khayelihle Khaya Lami"
10. "Lifikile Ivangeli"
11. "Woza Emthonjeni"
12. "Vukani Sihambe Zingelosi"
