= Isak Roux =

South African born German composer (born 1959)

Isak Roux is a South African born German composer born in 1959. He is known for his arrangements of South African music, especially his work with the musical groups Ladysmith Black Mambazo and Kwela Tebza.

== Early life and education ==
Born in Durban, KwaZulu-Natal, South Africa April 4, 1959, Isak Roux studied at the University of Natal where he obtained a Bachelor of Music and, in 1988, a Masters of Music in composition, with the dissertation Local music: Exploring the technical possibilities for establishing a South African compositional style. This study was conducted under the supervision of Jürgen Bräuniger and composer Kevin Volans.

In 1988 Roux relocated to Germany, taking classes in composition with Ulrich Süsse at the Staatliche Hochschule für Musik in Stuttgart.

== Professional career ==
Since 1991, Roux has taught at the Waldorf School in Stuttgart.

His work as a composer, arranger and pianist (both solo and ensemble) started while he was at university. Musical direction of productions such as Wakeman, Wakeman 2 and With a little help from my friends followed. Increasingly, he added choral composition and conducting to his list of musical activities.

Resident in Europe, Roux has participated in musical festivals such as the Tonkünstlerfest (Baden-Württemberg, 1990 and 1993) and the International Composers' Workshop (Amsterdam, 1996). In 1999, he delivered a lecture-recital for the Stuttgart German-American Society on South African (township) jazz. His commitment to African musical forms, rhythms and instrumentation has, however, remained central to his creative vision.

He has composed syncretically in avant-garde, post-avant-garde and contemporary classical styles (so-called new music), with his music regularly being performed in Germany, South Africa, the UK and the US.

As an arranger he has become well known for his arrangements of South African music (traditional Afrikaans, Cape-Malay and Zulu –for piano, ensemble and voice). Over the past few years his musical association with the music organisation Music is a great Investment (MIAGI), as well as super groups Ladysmith Black Mambazo and Kwela Tebza has brought him wider recognition as both a composer and arranger, in South Africa and abroad.

== Work ==
=== Compositions ===
STAGE

Ritual: Modern ballet/dance music, choreography by Paul Douglas. Two pianos. 1997

ORCHESTRAL

Intrada Africana: small orchestra. 2005
Kwela Concerto: four penny whistles, string orchestra and percussion. 2004 (commissioned)

CHAMBER MUSIC

Music for Tenor Saxophone and Piano: 1981
Composition for String Quartet: 1981
Songs of the Urban Wanderer: violin and harp. 1987
Iculo lezingane: piano, vibraphone/marimba, percussion, cello. 1987
Landscape: trombone, tape, 1995
Lines, fragments, machines: violin, synthesizer, percussion, tape. 1996, revised 1998
Sketches: flute, marimba. 1997
Four African Scenes, flute, oboe, clarinet, French horn, bassoon. 1999 (commissioned)
Balafo (Études in African Rhythm): two marimbas. 1999
Kleine Chronik: clarinet, piano, 1999
Prime Cuts: Zwei Konstruktionen: oboe, cello. 1999 (commissioned)
Tekweni Suite: saxophone quartet. 2003 (commissioned)
Diepkloof Groove: saxophone quartet. 2007 (commissioned)

CHORAL

Dona nobis pacem: soprano, alto, tenor, bass (SATB), flute, double bass, percussion, piano. 1986
Missa Brevis: boys’ chorus (SSA), flute, cello, harpsichord, two African drums. 1991 (commissioned)
Coming Home: (multilingual; original text by Johann P. Boshoff), speaker, soprano, lyrical tenor, baritone, choir, string orchestra, jazz band, African percussion, 2008 (commissioned).

SOLO VOCAL

Verbeeldingsvlug: Text by Johann P. Boshoff. Solo voice. 1985
Die ou vrou se lied: Text by Johann P. Boshoff. Solo voice. 1985
Stations (The Way of the Cross) (multilingual, original text by Johann P. Boshoff), bass, speaker, string quartet, piano, harpsichord, percussion, 2002

PIANO

Music for Two Pianists. 1983
Ritual: Dance for Two Pianos. 1997
Preludes in African Rhythm. 1992-2000
Home. 2000
In Thy Presence. 2001
Penny Whistle Song. 2001
Five South African Ragtimes. 2001
Piano Afrika Songs, 2001
Siyabonga. 2002
African Miniatures: Music for young pianists. 2004
Dr Kwela–Mr Ragtime, 2006 (commissioned).

=== Arrangement and adaptations ===
Izintombi zaseKwatazi: Traditional Zulu. SATB. Undated
Tischlied: Text by Johann Wolfgang von Goethe and music Maxilian Eberwein. SATB, piano. 1986
Walil' untwana: Original melody by Welcome Duru. SATB. 1986
Mit Lieb bin ich umfangen: Original by Johann Steuerlein. SATB. 1986
Tant' Hessie & Volkies: Traditional Afrikaans. SAB. 1986
Twelve (12) songs for Ladysmith Black Mambazo: arrangements for male voices and chamber orchestra, 2003 (commissioned)
Some Night Music, adaptations of three works by Mozart for four penny whistles, string orchestra, percussion and rhythm section, 2004 (commissioned)
Agnus Dei, baritone/mezzo soprano with piano and clarinet, 2006 revision of 1988 composition
Watermelon Song: saxophone quartet, vibraphone, bass guitar and percussion. 2007
Dona nobis pacem, new adaptation for ladies choir, piano and clarinet, 2007 (commissioned)
Cape Medley (in Afrikaans, of “Boegoeberg se dam” and “Saai die waatlemoen”), children’s choir and piano, 2007 (commissioned).

=== Discography ===
COMMERCIAL

"Four African Scenes" on News for Woodwinds. Domus Quintet (Dolphin, 1999)
African Journal (various pieces). (Mp3.com, 2000)
Eine Hand voll Erde (various pieces). Isak Roux on piano (self-released, 2000), First Composer’s Portrait Concert in Stuttgart
Piano Afrika: Isak Roux plays traditional folk songs. Isak Roux, piano (Rhythm Records, 2001)
Piano Afrika 2: Honky Tonk Solo. Isak Roux, piano (self-released, GEMA, 2002)
“Township Guitar” (from Preludes in African Rhythm). Peter von Wienhardt, piano (Edition Musikat, 2002)
John Outland Christmas Chorale, 2004 (also DVD)
"Tekweni Suite" on We are not alone. Saxofourte, (BMG Ariola Classics, 2004)
No Boundaries. Ladysmith Black Mambazo, Isak Roux–producer, arranger, composer and pianist (Heads Up International HUCD 3092, 2005), nominated for Grammy Award in category Best World Music Album in February 2006.

ARCHIVE RECORDINGS

Ritual: Dance for Two Pianos. Private recording, Stuttgart. 2002
Stations, Stuttgart, 19 April 2002 (première), bass: Friedemann Lutz and Home, Balafo, and Mopani, 2002, the Second Composer’s Portrait Concert in Stuttgart
Stations, Bloemfontein, August 2002 (South African première), bass: Vuyani Mlinde.

PERFORMANCES

Annually, since 1996, as pianist with John Outland’s Christmas Chorale or his other events in Germany
April & August 2002: Pianist in Stations
November 2002: Two jamming sessions with the late Jake “Big Voice” Lerole in the ICMF Heritage Concerts in Pretoria and Johannesburg, South Africa
November 2003: Première of 12 songs featured on the CD No Boundaries performed with Ladysmith Black Mambazo, the English Chamber Orchestra and players from the ICMF Orchestra–Roux on piano
April 2005: Third Composer’s Portrait Concert in Stuttgart, with the European première of Ritual: Dance for Two Pianos, Music for Two Pianists and African Miniatures
November 2005: Première of Some Night Music, Kwela Concerto and other arrangements
Throughout 2006: Kwela Tebza performed Roux’s arrangements and compositions in Oudtshoorn, Cape Town, Pretoria, Johannesburg (South Africa), and Bern, Switzerland, the last with Roux on piano
September 2006: On piano with Ladysmith Black Mambazo, titles from No Boundaries, in Johannesburg, South Africa
17 May 2008: On piano in Coming Home, Johannesburg, 2008 December 2006: Revised Agnus Dei performed by John Outland’s Christmas Chorale in Stuttgart
Saxofourte performs Tekweni Suite in Germany and abroad virtually every week
William Chapman-Nyaho regularly performs parts of African Miniatures and Preludes in African Rhythm for Piano.

SHEET MUSIC

In F.Z. van der Merwe South African/Africana music collection at the University of Pretoria, along with background correspondence and information.

Published:
1998: "Die ou vrou se lied", in Johann P. Boshoff's book of Afrikaans poetry Bloot
2007: "Dr Kwela–Mr Ragtime", Unisa, Grade 6 Piano Examination Pieces
2007: "Kwela No. 1" and "Lullaby" in Piano Music of Africa and the African Diaspora Volume 1, Chapman-Nyaho (ed.), Oxford University Press.

PUBLICATIONS

Featured artist, in English, in ClassicFeel Magazine (South Africa, October 2003)
Featured artist, in Afrikaans, in Kakkerlak 8 (South Africa, July 2007)
Various programme notes, also by Isak Roux, Michael Spencer and Johann P. Boshoff

ACADEMIC STUDIES OF ROUX'S WORK

Van den Heever, M., "Die Suid-Afrikaanse weergawe van Stations van Isak Roux". BMus essay. University of Pretoria, Pretoria, 2005
Mosupyoe, L., "A performance-based study of the Preludes in African Rhythm by Isak Roux". BMus essay. University of Pretoria, Pretoria, 2008.
