= Wenyukela =

Studio album by Ladysmith Black Mambazo
- Released: 5 March 2003
- Recorded: January 2003
- Genre: Isicathamiya
- Length: 54:03
- Label: Gallo Record Company
- Producer: Joseph Shabalala

Ladysmith Black Mambazo chronology
Chillout Sessions (2002)	Wenyukela (2003)	The Very Best of Ladysmith Black Mambazo – Rain, Rain, Beautiful Rain (2004)

Wenyukela is an album by the South African isicathamiya group Ladysmith Black Mambazo. The album was expected to have (and it did have) a solemn touch; it was the first album release after the murder of leader Joseph Shabalala's wife Nellie, in May 2002. It was released on 5 March 2003. A British version with four extra tracks was released under the title Raise Your Spirit Higher: Wenyukela. An American version titled Raise Your Spirit Higher was released in January 2004.

== Track listing ==
1. "Wenyukela (Raise Your Spirit Higher)"
2. "Uqinisil' Ubaba (The Lord is the Light and the Truth)"
3. "Selingelethu Sonke"
4. "Wangibambezela (Don't Waste His Time)"
5. "Wenza Ngani? (How Did You Do That)"
6. "Udidekil' Umhlaba (Lord's Work)"
7. "Iyahlonipha Lengane"
8. "Wamlul' Umshado (Beautiful Wedding)"
9. "Because I Love You"
10. "Black Is Beautiful"
11. "Music Knows No Boundaries"
12. "Fak' Ibhande (Don't Drink and Drive)"
13. "Tribute"
