= Thandiswa =

Thandiswa is a South African feminine given name. Notable people with the name include:

- Thandiswa Marawu, South African politician
- Thandiswa Mazwai (born 1976), South African musician
