= Russel Mthembu =

- Born: March 12, 1947 (age 79)
- Years active: 1976-2017

Ndoda Russel Mthembu was a member of Ladysmith Black Mambazo, a South African choral group founded in 1960 by close friend Joseph Shabalala.

Russel was born in Ladysmith, South Africa, and joined Ladysmith Black Mambazo in 1976. It was at this time that Joseph converted to Christianity, which saw the group's output include Zulu hymns and songs of a religious nature. Russel joined the group as a bass voice, along with Jabulani Dubazana (who later sung as a tenor voice).

Russel has been a full-time member of the group since the 1980s. He retired from the group in 2017.
