= Shaka Zulu (album) =

Studio album by Ladysmith Black Mambazo
- Released: 1987
- Genres: Isicathamiya, World Music
- Length: 36:41
- Label: Warner Bros.
- Producer: Paul Simon

Ladysmith Black Mambazo chronology
Ezulwini Siyakhona (1986)	Shaka Zulu (1987)	Thandani (1987)

Professional ratings
Review scores
Source	Rating
Allmusic	4.5/5 stars
Robert Christgau	A−

Shaka Zulu is a 1987 album by South African a cappella group Ladysmith Black Mambazo.

== History ==
Following the collaboration on Paul Simon's 1986 album Graceland, which brought the group to international prominence, Shaka Zulu (produced by Simon) marked the band's first genuine international hit, securing them an American audience which would be built upon by the successes of Journey of Dreams (1988) and Two Worlds, One Heart (1990). Shaka Zulu was a collection of newly recorded versions of older Mambazo hits, such as "Unomathemba", "Hello My Baby" and "Lomhlaba Kawunoni".

Shaka Zulu won a Grammy in 1988 for Best Traditional Folk Recording.

The album was also featured in Robert Dimery's 2006 musical reference book 1001 Albums You Must Hear Before You Die.

== Reception ==
In his consumer guide for The Village Voice, Robert Christgau felt the album had a "generalized gospel yearning", and a lyric sheet and songs in English that would appeal to Americans.

In a retrospective review for Allmusic, William Ruhlmann felt the album was "pristinely recorded" and is the band's most accessible album.

== Track listing ==
All songs composed by Joseph Shabalala and produced by Paul Simon

1. "Unomathemba" - 3:47
2. "Hello My Baby" - 3:09
3. "Golgotha" - 3:57
4. "King of Kings" - 4:07
5. "Lomhlaba Kawunoni" - 2:55
6. "How Long?" - 3:05
7. "Ikhaya Lamaqhawe" - 3:13
8. "Yibo Labo" - 4:39
9. "Rain, Rain Beautiful Rain" - 2:18
10. "Wawusho Kubani?" - 5:31

== Charts ==
Chart performance for Shaka Zulu
Chart (1987)	Peak position
Australian Albums (Kent Music Report)	27
Dutch Albums (Album Top 100)	8
New Zealand Albums (RMNZ)	27
UK Albums (Official Charts)	34
