= Nellie Shabalala =

Nellie Shabalala (1953 – May 15, 2002) was the wife of Ladysmith Black Mambazo (LBM) leader and founder, Joseph Shabalala, for over thirty years. She had formed her own allied group, Women of Mambazo, in the 1970s. The group were beginning to create a name for themselves after touring with LBM in the United Kingdom in 2001, but disbanded after Nellie Shabalala was shot and killed by a masked gunman, initially for unknown reasons, in May 2002.

== Women of Mambazo ==
In October 2001, Joseph Shabalala brought his wife's group, Women of Mambazo (WOM) to the UK to support LBM in their thirty-date tour of the country. The group, formed of members from the Shabalala's church in South Africa, the Church of God of Prophecy, were a hit with audiences. After both Mambazo groups returned home to South Africa, Joseph organised the recording of WOM's first album.

== Murder ==
In May 2002, Nellie was murdered outside their home in Clermont, Durban, by a masked gunman. Shabalala's hand was injured after struggling to catch his wife's killer. Tributes immediately began pouring in for Nellie from a wide cross-section of fans, friends, and fellow musicians from around the world. A major, high-profile trial followed, in which Joseph's son (Nellie's stepson) Nkosinathi Vivian was accused of hiring a hitman to kill his stepmother. The trial ended in March 2004 when Nellie's real killer, Mboneni Mdunge, was sentenced to life imprisonment.

The unfinished Women of Mambazo album, Mamizolo, was posthumously released in 2003 as a tribute to Nellie Shabalala.
