= Journey of Dreams (album) =

Studio album by Ladysmith Black Mambazo
- Released: 1988
- Label: Warner Bros.
- Producer: Russ Titelman, Joseph Shabalala

Ladysmith Black Mambazo chronology
Zibuyinhlazane (1988)	Journey of Dreams (1988)	Isigqi Zendoda (1990)

Journey of Dreams is an album by the South African vocal group Ladysmith Black Mambazo, released in 1988. Journey of Dreams also served as the title of a film about frontman Joseph Shabalala, directed by David Lister and shot around the same time. Shabalala chose the title in part to describe his journey from his birthplace of Ladysmith to international success. It also refers to his desire to get the sound he heard in his dreams on to record. The album was nominated for a Grammy Award for "Best Traditional Folk Recording". The group supported it with North American tour.

== Production ==
The album was coproduced by Russ Titelman. The group recorded two songs in tribute to Paul Simon, who had collaborated with them on Graceland. Simon also arranged and sang on the group's version of "Amazing Grace". "Hamba Dompasi (No More Passbook)" is about South Africa's pass laws. "Bavim' Indela (The Stumbling Block)" is a tribute to Miriam Makeba and Hugh Maskela. Ladysmith Black Mambazo sang two of the album's songs in English.

== Critical reception ==
Professional ratings
Review scores
Source	Rating
AllMusic	3/5 stars
Robert Christgau	B+
The Encyclopedia of Popular Music	4/5 stars
MusicHound World: The Essential Album Guide	3/5 stars
The Rolling Stone Album Guide	4/5 stars

Robert Christgau noted that "Simon takes the lead on 'Amazing Grace', the 'Send in the Clowns' of roots music." The Philadelphia Inquirer determined that the album "elevates leader Joseph Shabalala's spirituals to theatrical heights." The Toronto Star called it "a candid weaving of spiritually inspired Zulu folklore interspersed with vivid accounts of Ladysmith's own history."

The Philadelphia Daily News praised the "winsome, frisky folk harmony sound." The Richmond Times-Dispatch called Journey of Dreams "soulfully mesmerizing." The St. Louis Post-Dispatch admired "the lush fullness of 10 male voices in thick harmony [and] the intricate rhythmic shifts of Shabalala's lead vocals around the dense response of the choir."

== Track listing ==
No.	Title	Length
1.	"Umusa Kankulunkulo (Mercy of God)"
2.	"Lindelani (Get Ready)"
3.	"Ukhalangami (You Cry for Me)"
4.	"Bavim' Indela (The Stumbling Block)"
5.	"Bashobha (Watch)"
6.	"Nomakanjani (Dark or Blue)"
7.	"Hamba Dompasi (No More Passbook)"
8.	"Ungayoni Into Enhle (Destroy Not This Beauty)"
9.	"Amaphiko Okundiza (Wings to Fly)"
10.	"Wayibambezela (Don't Waste Her Time)"
11.	"Ungakhohlwa (Don't Forget)"
12.	"Amazing Grace"
