= Homeless (Paul Simon and Ladysmith Black Mambazo song) =

Song by Paul Simon and Ladysmith Black Mambazo

from the album Graceland
- Released: 1986
- Recorded: April 1986
- Genre: Worldbeat
- Length: 3:48
- Label: Warner Bros.
- Songwriters: Joseph Shabalala; Paul Simon
- Producer: Paul Simon

"Homeless" is a 1986 song by Paul Simon and Ladysmith Black Mambazo lead singer Joseph Shabalala.

The song was the first recorded by Simon and Ladysmith Black Mambazo for Simon's album Graceland. The song launched the international career of the South African group and introduced Zulu isicathimiya music to new western audiences. Shabalala provided the music, from the melody of a traditional Zulu wedding tune, and new Zulu words. Simon provided the English lyrics. The text has been taken as protest music, though Shabalala has said that the phrase "we are homeless" is similar to the words a Zulu person uses when proposing to his bride.

"Diamonds on the Soles of Her Shoes" and "Homeless" were both rerecorded by Ladysmith Black Mambazo for the 2006 album Long Walk to Freedom.

== Personnel ==
- Joseph Shabalala – lead vocals
- Paul Simon – vocals
- Ladysmith Black Mambazo – vocals
