= Jabulani Dubazana =

South African singer (born 1954)

- Born: April 25, 1954 (age 72)
- Years active: 1976–2005
- Formerly of: Ladysmith Black Mambazo

Jabulani Frederick Mwelase Dubazana was a member of Ladysmith Black Mambazo, a South African choral group founded in 1960 by close friend Joseph Shabalala.

Dubazana was born in Ladysmith, South Africa, and joined Ladysmith Black Mambazo in 1976. It was at this time that Joseph converted to Christianity, which saw the group's output include Zulu hymns and songs of a religious nature. Jabulani joined the group with Russel Mthembu, both singing bass parts (until very recently, when Dubazana sung as a tenor voice).

Dubazana retired from the group in August 2005.
