= Albert Mazibuko =

South African singer (1948–2026)

- Born: 1 June 1948
- Died: 5 April 2026 (aged 77)
- Genre: Isicathamiya
- Years active: 1969–2025

Mdletshe Albert Mazibuko (1 June 1948 – 5 April 2026) was a South African singer who was a member of Ladysmith Black Mambazo, a choral group founded in 1960 by his cousin Joseph Shabalala.

== Life and career ==
Albert Mazibuko was born in Ladysmith, South Africa, and was the second child of six children of three boys and three girls; the others being Nontukuzo Mazibuko, Nelisiwe Mazibuko, Kholiwe Mazibuko, and his two brothers Milton Mazibuko and Abednego Mazibuko. He grew up on a farm. Although his father Mashumi Mazibuko believed in the importance of education, Albert had to leave school early and work full-time on the farm between the ages of eight and fifteen. He worked as a manual labourer in a number of jobs prior to joining Mambazo, including in an asbestos factory.

Mazibuko joined Mambazo in 1969 as a tenor, with his brother Milton as an alto. Much later, Albert was the only original member left in the group and saw many changes; whereas the early line-ups were formed by a few Shabalalas and two Mazibukos, the group largely included members unrelated to the Shabalalas. His older brother Milton died of natural causes in 1980 after the Intokozo album. His youngest brother Abednego had joined in the year 1974, Albert remained in the line-up and has been a full-time member of the group since 1973. In 1957, at age nine, Albert founded his own Isicathamiya choir, the Zulu Motos "SS Choir", based in Ladysmith.

He met his wife Lillian Dlomo Mazibuko in 1971 and got married in 1976. Together, they had four children. Albert Mazibuko died on 5 April 2026, at the age of 77.
