= Ladysmith Black Mambazo =

South African male acappella ensemble

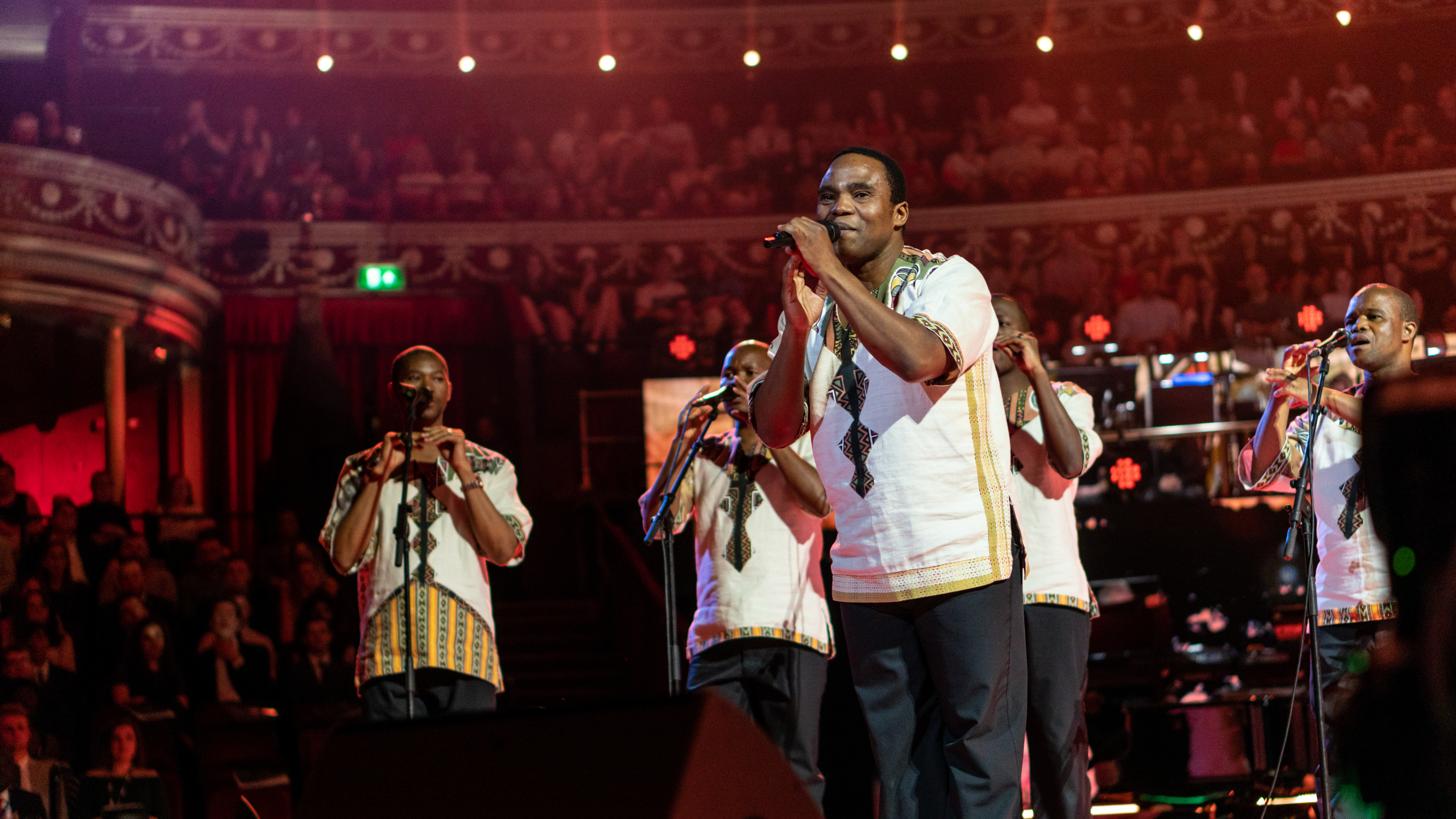
- Ladysmith Black Mambazo performing at The Queen's Birthday Party in 2018

Background information
- Origin: Ladysmith, KwaZulu-Natal, South Africa
- Genres: Isicathamiya, Mbube
- Years active: 1960–present
- Labels: Gallo; Warner Bros.; Shanachie; Wrasse; Heads Up International; Listen2
- Spinoffs: Young Mbazo
- Members: Thulani Shabalala; Thamsanqa Shabalala; Sibongiseni Shabalala; Msizi Shabalala; Pius Shezi; Abednego Mazibuko; Sabelo Mthembu; Mfanafuthi Dlamini
- Past members: Jockey Shabalala (Died 2006); Albert Mazibuko (Died 2026); Jabulani Dubazana; Inos Phungula; Ben Shabalala; Geophrey Mdletshe; Headman Shabalala (Died 1991); Milton Mazibuko; Funokwakhe Mazibuko; Joseph Shabalala (Died 2020); Walter Malinga; Russel Mthembu
- Website: www.mambazo.com

Ladysmith Black Mambazo is a South African male choral group singing in the local vocal styles of isicathamiya and mbube. They became internationally recognised after singing with American Paul Simon on his 1986 album Graceland. They have since won multiple awards, including five Grammy Awards the fifth of which they dedicated to the late former South African President Nelson Mandela.

Formed by Joseph Shabalala in 1960, Ladysmith Black Mambazo became one of South Africa's most prolific musical groups. Their releases received gold and platinum disc honours in both South Africa and abroad. The group became a mobile academy of South African cultural heritage through their African indigenous isicathamiya music.

== History ==
=== 1960–1986 ===
The first incarnation of Ladysmith Black Mambazo was "Ezimnyama" ("The Black Ones"), formed by Joseph Shabalala in December 1960. The members of the group were relatives (mostly brothers and cousins) of Shabalala, with many having sung with him while he was growing up on the farm where he was born. Although the group did sing well together and captured the sound of cothoza mfana ("tiptoe boys", a 1960s slang term for isicathamiya, the traditional music of the Zulu people) and mbube groups of the time, they were unknown outside of the Ladysmith district.

In 1964, Shabalala had a series of recurring dreams during his sleep, over a period of six months, featuring a choir singing in perfect harmony. Shabalala described this as a beautiful sound, and one not yet achieved by his group of the time. As a result, he reformed the group, bringing on board newer (younger) relatives but keeping the group name. He strove to teach them the harmonies from his dreams, creating what was to become a signature tune for the group: "Nomathemba" (a girl's name, meaning "hope"). After deciding that this group well replicated the beautiful, soft sounds from his dreams, Shabalala entered the group into isicathamiya competitions, held on Saturday nights in the halls of hostels in Durban and Johannesburg. The group managed to win nearly every competition that was held. As a result, Shabalala decided to change the name of the group to be more descriptive of its talent. The name "Ezimnyama" was replaced by "Ladysmith Black Mambazo".

The three elements of the new name were the hometown of Shabalala's family, Ladysmith, KwaZulu-Natal; the black ox, considered to be the strongest farm animal; and mambazo, which means "axe" in the Zulu language, and is symbolic of the choir's ability to "chop down" the competition.

Eventually, by the early 1970s, the group was forbidden to compete in the competitions because of their continual success. They were, however, welcome to perform without taking part in the competition itself.

In 1967, the group began to make recordings for the SABC station Radio Zulu, appearing in DJ Alexius Buthelezi's popular Cothoza Mfana programme, which spotlighted the music of several local choirs. Their success was so great that music producers began enticing the group to sign a recording contract. In 1972 the group signed with Gallo Record Company under producer West Nkosi at the organisation's African music division, Mavuthela Music Company (Nkosi was also well known in South Africa as a saxophone jive star). Ladysmith Black Mambazo released their first album the following year, Amabutho, which received gold status and was the first album by a black musician or group in South Africa to do so. Their subsequent albums also received gold or platinum certification. With the release of their second album, they had become professional singers.

The group saw many changes; whereas the early line-ups were formed of a few Shabalalas and two Mazibukos, Funokwakhe and Joseph, the group largely included members unrelated to Joseph. Joseph Shabalala's cousin Mdletshe Albert Mazibuko (the eldest of the six brothers) joined Mambazo in 1969 as a tenor voice, with his younger brother Milton as an alto voice. Albert is the longest remaining member of Ladysmith Black Mambazo aside from Joseph Shabalala and has been a full-time member of the group since 1973. After the killing of his brother Milton in 1980, Albert remained in the line-up, by which time his brothers Funokwakhe Mazibuko and Joseph Mazibuko had left Ladysmith Black Mambazo and his youngest brother Abednego had joined.

In 1976, Shabalala converted to Christianity and a host of religious material now entered the group's repertoire. Mambazo's first religious album, Ukukhanya Kwelanga, was released soon afterwards. It earned a double platinum disc award, and the group's repertoire came to be dominated by hymns, mostly Methodist. Their 1976 LP Ukusindiswa became one of their most popular religious albums, selling double gold discs within three weeks of release. By 1981, the group's popularity was such that the apartheid government allowed the members to travel to Cologne, Germany as part of a South African folk music festival. The group toured West Germany and appeared on television, and learned some of the German language; for the group's 1981 album Phansi Emgodini, Shabalala composed a song entitled "Wir Grüssen Euch Alle" ("We greet you all"). The following year, the group travelled back to Germany to appear on a televised quiz programme, bringing about requests for more live appearances. A track by the group also appeared on the groundbreaking British compilation album The Indestructible Beat of Soweto.

=== 1986–1993 ===
In 1985, Paul Simon travelled to South Africa in the hope of collaborating with African musicians for his Graceland album. Simon contacted Shabalala and conversed with him in person – after much discussion and excitement, the group travelled to London to record with Simon. The first recording was "Homeless" — the music and chorus were composed by Simon, with Shabalala composing the Zulu introduction and main (non-English) body of the song. They also sang on the song "Diamonds on the Soles of Her Shoes" and "You Can Call Me Al". Simon brought the group to New York City to perform on Saturday Night Live and they performed "Diamonds..." prior to the album or song being released. Graceland was released in late 1986, and although both Joseph Shabalala and Paul Simon were accused of breaking the cultural boycott of South Africa, the album became a huge success and sold 16 million copies and further boosted Ladysmith Black Mambazo's international image. This also paved the way for other African acts such as Stimela and Mahlathini and the Mahotella Queens to gain popularity among Western audiences.

After Graceland, Simon acted as producer for their first album for US release on Warner Brothers Records, Shaka Zulu (1987). Shaka Zulu won the Grammy Award for Best Traditional Folk Recording in 1988. Two more records were recorded for Warner Brothers Records in the US: Journey of Dreams (1988) and Two Worlds One Heart (1990). On the latter album, the group recorded with The Winans, Julia Fordham and George Clinton among other then-popular artists.

The success of the Graceland recording and subsequent concert tours led to a strong touring life for the group that continues to this day. Ladysmith Black Mambazo perform concert tours around the world for six or more months every year.

In 1988, Ladysmith Black Mambazo appeared in Michael Jackson's movie Moonwalker, where they performed "The Moon Is Walking" (an abridged version of the song "Lindelani", which appears on Journey of Dreams) over the end credits. Ladysmith Black Mambazo was also featured in the Sesame Street song "Put Down the Duckie", as well as "The African Alphabet".

In 1988, Ladysmith Black Mambazo sang "Mbube" during the opening sequence of the Eddie Murphy movie Coming to America, but the song was not released on the soundtrack.

In August 1990, Ladysmith Black Mambazo performed together with the Cologne group Bläck Fööss in front of the Cologne Cathedral.

On 10 December 1991, Shabalala's brother and one of the bass members in the group, Headman Shabalala, was shot and killed by Sean Nicholas, a white off-duty security guard. Headman's death was followed by the retirement of two members in 1993 and Shabalala recruited three of his sons into the group.

=== 1993–2002 ===
Apartheid legislation was repealed in the early 1990s, and democratic general elections were held in 1994. The release of Nelson Mandela after 27 years imprisonment brought a celebratory album release – 1993's Liph' Iqiniso. Mandela (shortly after his release from prison) publicly stated that the members of Ladysmith Black Mambazo were "South Africa's cultural ambassadors". At Mandela's request, Ladysmith Black Mambazo accompanied the future President of South Africa to the Nobel Peace Prize ceremony in Oslo, Norway, in 1993. Mambazo sang again at President Mandela's inauguration in May 1994, and then later at his birthday celebrations.

In 1993 four sons of Joseph Shabalala, Thamsanqa, Msizi, Thulani, and Sibongiseni, who had been in the junior choir Mshengu White Mambazo, moved up to join the group proper.

In 1995 South Africa was the host and eventual winners of the Rugby World Cup, in which Ladysmith Black Mambazo collaborated with PJ Powers in recording and performing World in Union.

In 1996, the group appeared on Dolly Parton's album Treasures, collaborating with Parton on a cover of Cat Stevens' "Peace Train"; they joined Parton for an appearance on a November 1996 US network television special to perform the song.

In 1997, for a run of UK television advertisements, "Toast for Life", for Heinz soups, baked beans and tomato ketchup, the group recorded an abridged version of "Inkanyezi Nezazi" ("The Star and the Wiseman"). The adverts proved so popular that the original studio version (recorded back in 1992) was released as a single and reached No. 33 on the UK Singles Chart. The single was followed up by The Best of Ladysmith Black Mambazo – The Star and the Wiseman in 1998, a compilation release that became so popular it was certified triple platinum, selling 1 million copies in Britain alone. The Heinz campaign led to a reawakening of the group in Britain, and many television and radio performances beckoned over the next few years, as well as performing for the British royal family. In 1999, the group collaborated with Irish pop group B*Witched on their single "I Shall Be There", which reached No. 13 on the UK Singles Chart.

A film documentary about Ladysmith Black Mambazo, On Tiptoe: Gentle Steps to Freedom, was released in 2000. The film was nominated for the Academy Award for Best Documentary (Short Subject) in 2001, but lost out to "Big Mama". The movie was presented the Best Short Documentary award by the 2001 International Documentary Association.

=== 2002–2006 ===
'Selingelethu Sonke' (2003)
This was the first time the group had written a song specifically about fair trade in Africa. They had originally spoken of it in Oxfam's campaign, Make Trade Fair.

The group began preparations for Wenyukela, an album of new material, in 2002. However, the making of the record underwent severe strain when, in May 2002, Shabalala's wife of 30 years (and lead singer in the allied group "Women of Mambazo"), Nellie, was murdered in a church car park by a masked gunman. Shabalala's hand was injured trying to protect his wife. Joseph's son Vivian Nkosinathi was accused of hiring a hitman to murder his stepmother Nellie. During the court trial, Nkosinathi supposedly testified that the South African police offered some kind of reprieve if he would implicate his own father, Joseph, in the murder. Wenyukela, however, went ahead, as Shabalala began to recover.

Wenyukela was a success in South Africa, prompting its release in Britain in March 2003 on Wrasse Records. Following the repeated success of the album, the American-based Heads Up International released the album in January 2004 and it garnered the group their second Grammy Award.

Joseph's brother Ben Shabalala, a former member of the group who had retired in 1993 after the death of Headman, was killed in a Durban suburb in June 2004.

The group is referenced in the 2004 film Mean Girls when Lindsay Lohan's character chooses not to accompany her parents to a Ladysmith Black Mambazo concert.

=== 2006–2008 ===
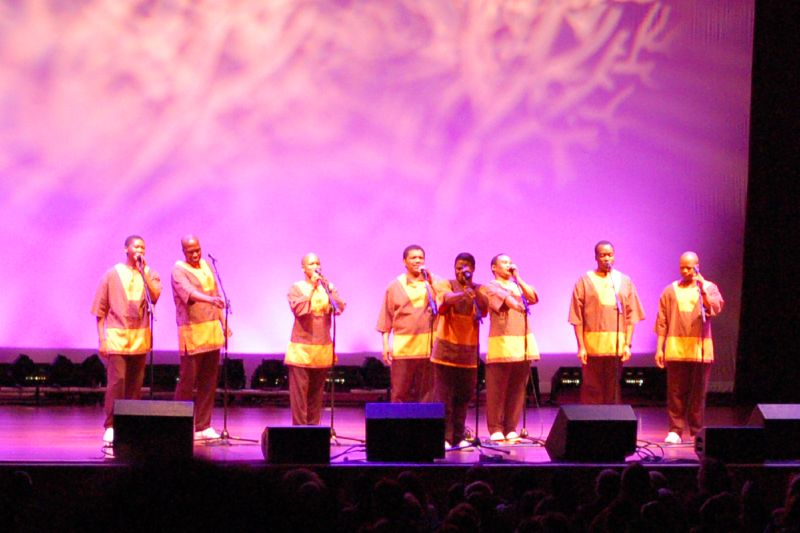
Ladysmith Black Mambazo performing in 2006 at the Ravinia Festival, Illinois

Long Walk to Freedom, a celebration of 45 years of Ladysmith Black Mambazo, was released by the group in January 2006. On the album the group recorded with a multitude of artists including Zap Mama, Sarah McLachlan, Melissa Etheridge, Joe McBride, Natalie Merchant, Emmylou Harris, and Taj Mahal as well as South African musicians Lucky Dube, Phuzekhemisi, Bhekumuzi Luthuli, Nokukhanya, Thandiswa, Vusi Mahlasela and Hugh Masekela. The release garnered the group their 13th Grammy Award nomination. Though it did not win the Grammy Award it showed the group's creative powers were still being recognised.

In April 2006, Mambazo collaborated with Josh Groban for his third studio album, Awake. The songs, "Weeping" and "Lullaby", featured a clear South African influence; lines from a Mambazo song, "Wangibambezela" ("Message from his Heart") were added to the backing track of "Weeping". Following this, in August 2006, Mambazo began working with Mavis Staples in a collaboration for Staples's new album. The television program Saturday Night Live featured the group in a TV Funhouse sketch, hosted by Dennis Haysbert, about failed Saturday morning cartoons starring black cartoon characters, one of which was a cartoon featuring the group, called Ladysmith Black Mambazo in Outer Space. Members of the group added commentary to the short for the DVD release of the SNL special The Best of TV Funhouse.

On 17 October 2006, Ladysmith Black Mambazo performed a sold-out concert, at New York's famed Carnegie Hall, billed as Long Walk to Freedom: An Evening with Ladysmith Black Mambazo and Friends. The night included special guest appearances by Sarah McLachlan, Natalie Merchant, Mahotella Queens, Vusi Mahlasela, and Pete Seeger. The concert was recorded but due to venue restrictions is not being allowed to be released.

Their 2007 CD, Ilembe, was released in South Africa on 26 February 2007 and worldwide on 22 January 2008, under the title Ilembe: Honoring Shaka Zulu, on Heads Up International.

=== 2008–present ===
There had been many questions on when founder, director, composer, and lead singer Joseph Shabalala would finally retire from his group. On 23 January 2008, Shabalala issued a statement on this.

The full statement is reproduced below:

In the early 1960s I had a dream of a type of singing group that I wanted to create. Not just a dream, in the wishful way, but an actual dream while I was asleep. This beautiful dream led to the creation of my group, Ladysmith Black Mambazo. Now, some forty five plus years later this original dream has led to so many more dreams. We have been awarded Grammy Awards, represented our homeland of South Africa at many prestigious events, including accompanying Nelson Mandela to Norway to receive the Nobel Peace Prize, traveled the world so many times and most importantly, spread a message of Peace, Love and Harmony to millions of people.

This was never a dream a black South African could ever imagine.

As the years have passed, and the 20th century became the 21st, I started to get asked what will happen to Ladysmith Black Mambazo once I retired, if I ever retired. Well, I have spent much time thinking about this. Ladysmith Black Mambazo was never about one person. Ladysmith Black Mambazo is a mission. A mission to spread our message and to keep our culture alive and known. South Africa is a most wonderful place, filled with beautiful people. By touring, as we have, almost seven months every year for over twenty years, we have wanted to keep South Africa alive in people's hearts.

Ladysmith Black Mambazo is a family. Within the group I have had brothers and cousins singing together. Over the past fifteen years, because of retirements and death, I have been joined by four of my sons. They are the future of Ladysmith Black Mambazo, our next generation. The mission and message will continue. When the time comes for me to finish touring and to stay home they will carry on my dream. As well, my son Thamsanqa (Tommy) will become the new leader of the group. Thus, the dream I had over forty five years ago will continue well into the 21st century. Ladysmith Black Mambazo must continue as the message of Peace, Love and Harmony never must be silenced. We never will be silenced and we hope our fans and friends around the world will keep wanting to hear this message.

Ngiyabonga! Thank you!

— Joseph Shabalala, 23 January 2008

Ladysmith Black Mambazo's 2007 release, Ilembe: Honoring Shaka Zulu, garnered success around the world. In 2008 the group won the SAMA Award for Best Traditional A Cappella Album for Ilembe and in 2009 won the Grammy Award for Best Traditional World Music Album, marking their third Grammy Award.

In January 2011 the group released a recording of original songs, Songs from a Zulu Farm. It received some of the best reviews the group had ever known, landing in the top five of most "Best World Music Releases" for 2011. It was nominated for a Grammy Award but did not win. It was also nominated for the Best Album of 2011 at the South African Music Awards.

In January 2013 the group released a new album, Live: Singing for Peace Around the World, which was dedicated to South African icon and former President Nelson Mandela. On 6 December 2013 it was announced that the album had been nominated by the Grammy Awards for Best World Music CD. This announcement came the day after the passing of Mandela. On 26 January 2014, the Grammy Awards announced it had won Best World Music CD for 2013. This was the fourth Grammy Award for the group and third since 2004. As well, in January 2014, Ladysmith released Always With Us, as a tribute to Joseph Shabalala's deceased wife. They are also currently recording a CD of American gospel songs, which will have a well known American singer joining them on the CD. They are also recording a follow-up recording to their recent Grammy-winning CD, to be called Songs of Peace & Love for Kids & Parents Around the World.

Ladysmith Black Mambazo was featured on the track Lift Me Up, along with Norwegian duo Nico & Vinz, on David Guetta's 2014 album Listen. Other features in 2016 include a vocal appearance on "Facing a Task Unfinished" by Keith and Kristyn Getty, "Wake Up" by Jennifer Saran, and Vian Izak's single "Brink of Love".

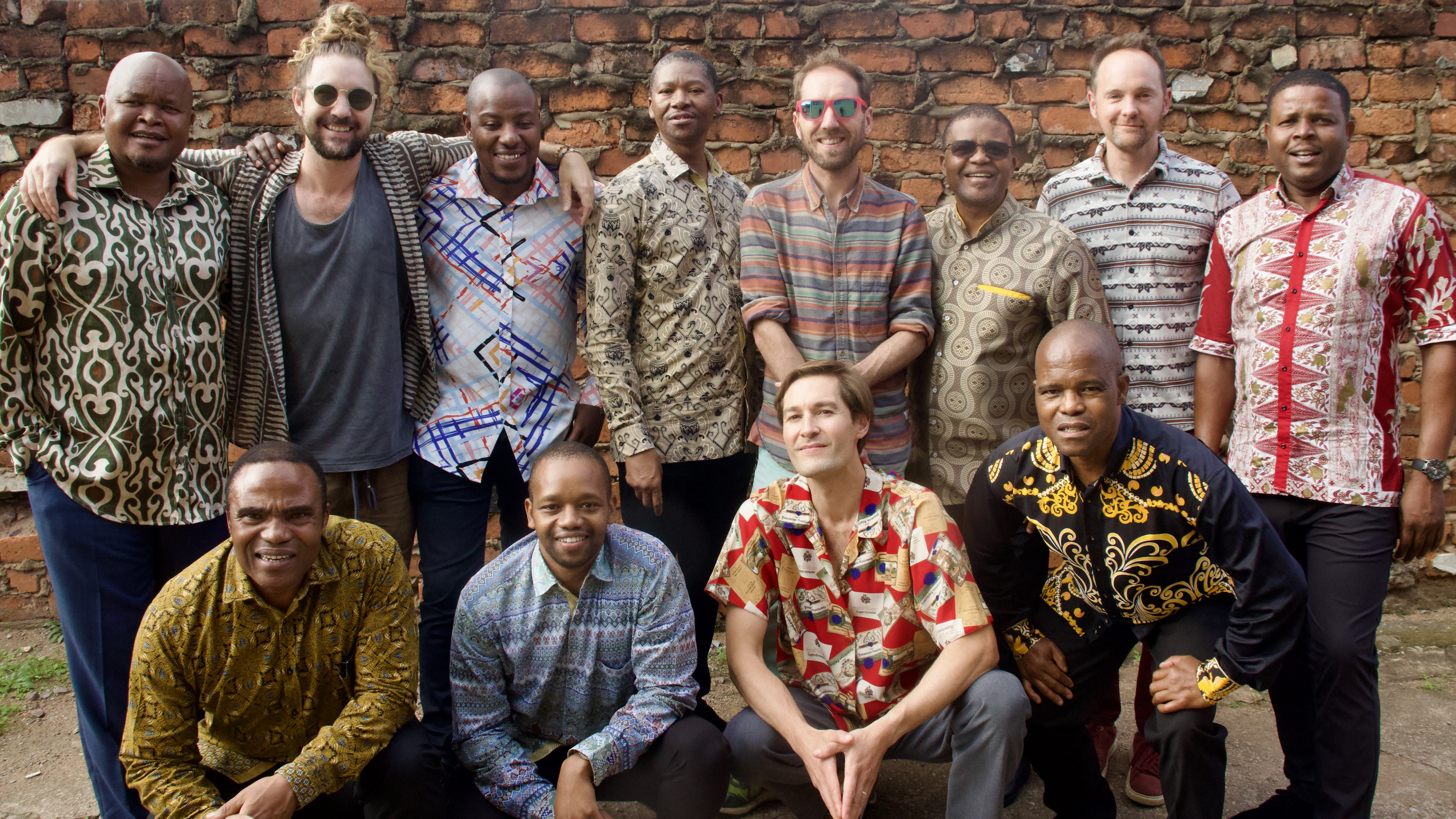
Stornoway with Ladysmith Black Mambazo in Durban, 30 May 2026. Standing (L to R): Pius Shezi, Jeremy Loops, Mfanafuthi Dlamini, Thamsanqa Shabalala, Brian Briggs, Sibongiseni Shabalala, Jon Ouin, Sabelo Mthembu. Seated (L to R): Thulani Shabalala, Gagamela Shabalala, Oli Steadman, Msizi Shabalala

In May 2026 the choir joined forces with UK band Stornoway in a MEGS-funded studio collaboration coordinated by Oli Steadman as part of the production of forthcoming LP Beyonder.

== Foundation ==
In January 1999, Joseph Shabalala founded "The Ladysmith Black Mambazo Foundation". The aim of the organisation is to teach young Zulu South African children about their traditional culture and music, isicathamiya. Today, the Mambazo Academy is currently being built, with plans for a rehearsal hall, teaching areas and a professional recording studio. The main aim is to promote and teach the history of isicathamiya music to young people.

== Awards and nominations ==
=== Awards ===
Year	Award	Category	Work
1981	SARIE Award	Best Choral Group on Disc	
1988	Grammy Award	Best Traditional Folk Recording	Shaka Zulu
1993	Drama Desk Award	Outstanding Music in a Play	The Song of Jacob Zulu (stage)
1997	SAMA Award	Best Zulu Music Album	Ukuzala-Ukuzelula
1997	SAMA Award	Best Duo or Group Award	Ukuzala-Ukuzelula
2001	SAMA Award	Best Zulu Music Album	Lihl' Ixhiba Likagogo
2004	Grammy Award	Best Traditional World Music Album	Raise Your Spirit Higher
2008	SAMA Award	Best Traditional A Cappella Album	Ilembe
2009	Grammy Award	Best Traditional World Music Album	Ilembe: Honoring Shaka Zulu
2013	Grammy Award	Best World Music Album	Live: Singing for Peace Around the World
2014	SAMA Award	International achievement award	
2018	Grammy Award	Best World Music Album	Shaka Zulu Revisited: 30th Anniversary Celebration

=== Nominations ===
Year	Award	Category	Work
1989	Grammy Award	Best Traditional Folk Recording	Journey of Dreams
1991	Grammy Award	Best Recording For Children	How the Leopard Got His Spots
1991	Grammy Award	Best Traditional Folk Recording	Classic Tracks
1995	Grammy Award	Best Traditional Folk Album	Liph' Iqiniso'
1996	Grammy Award	Best Traditional Folk Album	Thuthukani Ngoxolo
1999	Grammy Award	Best Traditional Folk Album	Live at the Royal Albert Hall
2001	Academy Award	Best Short Documentary Film	On Tiptoe: Gentle Steps to Freedom
2006	Grammy Award	Best Contemporary World Music Album	No Boundaries
2007	Grammy Award	Best Contemporary World Music Album	Long Walk to Freedom
2012	Grammy Award	Best World Music Album	Songs From a Zulu Farm
2016	Grammy Award	Best World Music Album	Music From Inala
2017	Grammy Award	Best World Music Album	Walking in the Footsteps of Our Fathers
2018	Grammy Award	Best Children's Album	Songs Of Peace & Love For Kids & Parents Around The World

== Touring past and future ==
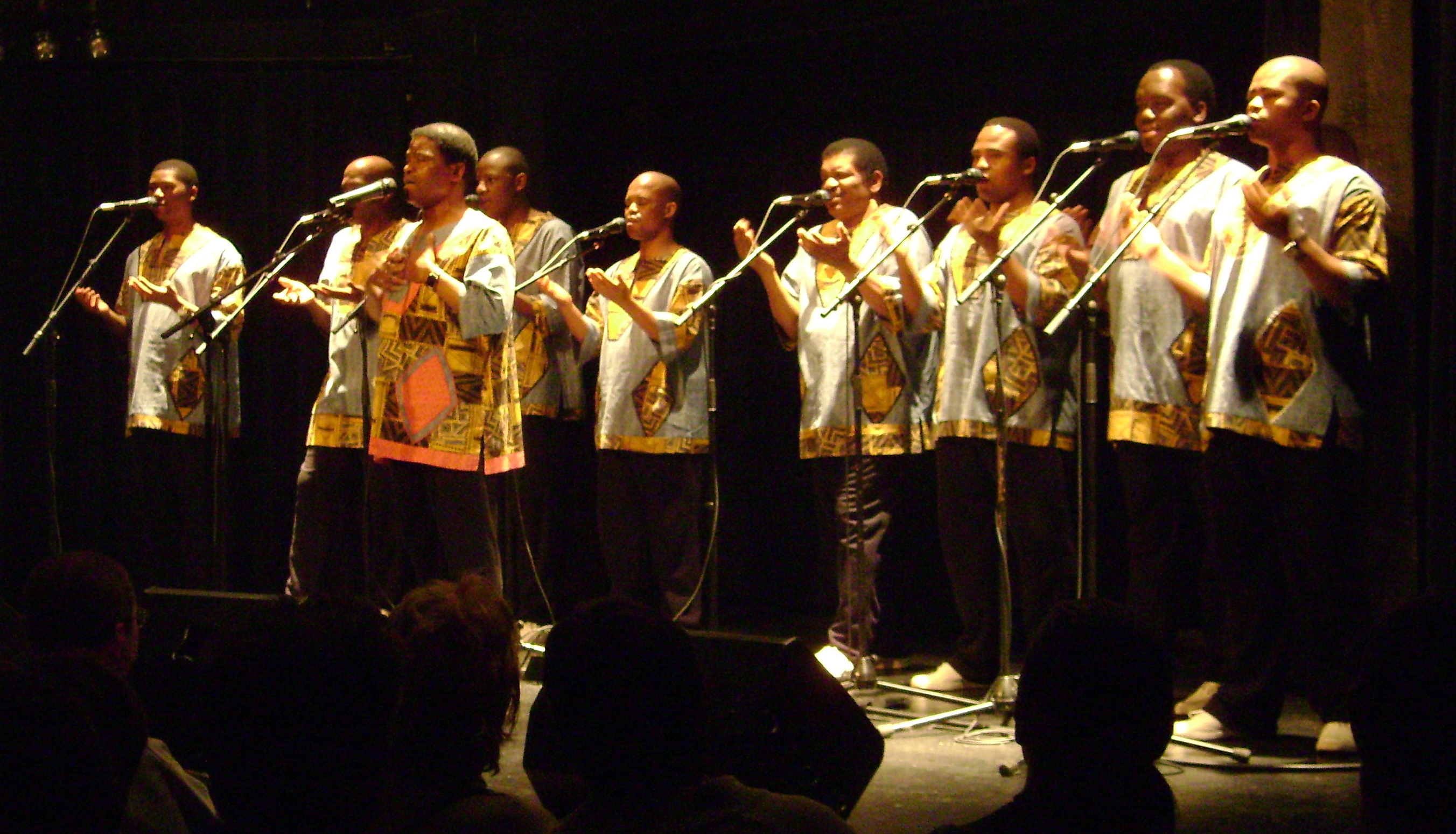
Ladysmith Black Mambazo in 2008 in Innsbruck, Austria

=== Competitions and the first Mambazo concerts ===
After the release of the group's first album, Amabutho, in 1973, they were banned from competing in the isicathamiya competitions because of their ability to win many of the competitions. They were, however, welcome to perform for the audience. Following this, the group started performing for their own audiences in shows that were specially made and, soon afterwards, the group began touring around South Africa in their own concerts, but due to the Apartheid system in use, they were often stopped by police guards; on some of these occasions they were even made to lie down on the ground whilst being searched. Shortly afterwards, they were allowed to tour without permits.

=== Graceland success ===
By 1986, the group had a very small number of white fans in South Africa; the majority of their fan base was black people (the group mainly toured in townships). After Paul Simon included the group on his "Graceland Tour of 1987", the group began touring by themselves.

== Membership ==
Initially, the group comprised Joseph Shabalala, his brothers Headman and Enoch, cousins Albert, Milton, Funokwakhe, Abednego, and Joseph Mazibuko, as well as close friends Matovoti Msimanga and Walter Malinga. Altogether, the group has had more than 30 different members at one point or another over the past 45 years. However, since 1993 there have only been two membership changes due to retirements.

The members of the group currently reside in or near Pinetown, just outside the coastal city of Durban in KwaZulu-Natal. The chorus' members are Joseph Shabalala's sons Thamsanqa, Msizi, Thulani, and Sibongiseni; cousins Albert and Abednego Mazibuko; and close friends Russel Mthembu and Ngane Dlamini.

== Discography ==
Ladysmith Black Mambazo recorded for the first time in 1973 on the Gallo label in South Africa. Since then the group has recorded more than 50 albums, many of which have received gold- and/or platinum-disc certification.

- Amabutho (1973)
- Imbongi (1973)
- Umama Lo! (1974)
- Isitimela (1974)
- Ukukhanya Kwelanga (1975)
- Amaqhawe (1976)
- Ukusindiswa (1977)
- Shintsha Sithothobala (1977)
- Phezulu Emafini (1977)
- Ushaka (1978)
- Indlela yaseZulwini (1978)
- Ezinkulu (1979)
- Ulwandle Oluncgwele (1981)
- Phansi Emgodini (1981)
- Umthombo Wamanzi (1982)
- Induku Zethu (1983)
- Ibhayibheli Liyindlela (1984)
- Inkazimulo (1985)
- Shaka Zulu (1987)
- Journey of Dreams (1988)
- Two Worlds One Heart (1990)
- Live at the Royal Albert Hall (1999)
- Lihl' Ixhiba Likagogo (2000)
- Wenyukela (2003)
- Raise Your Spirit Higher (2003)
- No Boundaries (2004)
- Long Walk to Freedom (2006)
- Ilembe (2007)
- My Dream – African Sounds (2008)
- Kobuye Kulunge (2010)
- Songs From a Zulu Farm (2011)
- Always with Us (2014)
- Music From Inala – A Zulu Ballet (with Ella Spira and The Inala Ensemble) (2014)
- Walking in the Footsteps of Our Fathers (2016)
- Songs of Peace and Love (2017)
- Soothe My Soul (2023)

== See also ==
- Isak Roux
