= Mbube (genre) =

South African music genre

- Cultural origins: 1930s, Union of South Africa

Regional scenes
- Ladysmith

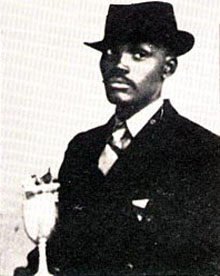
Solomon Linda

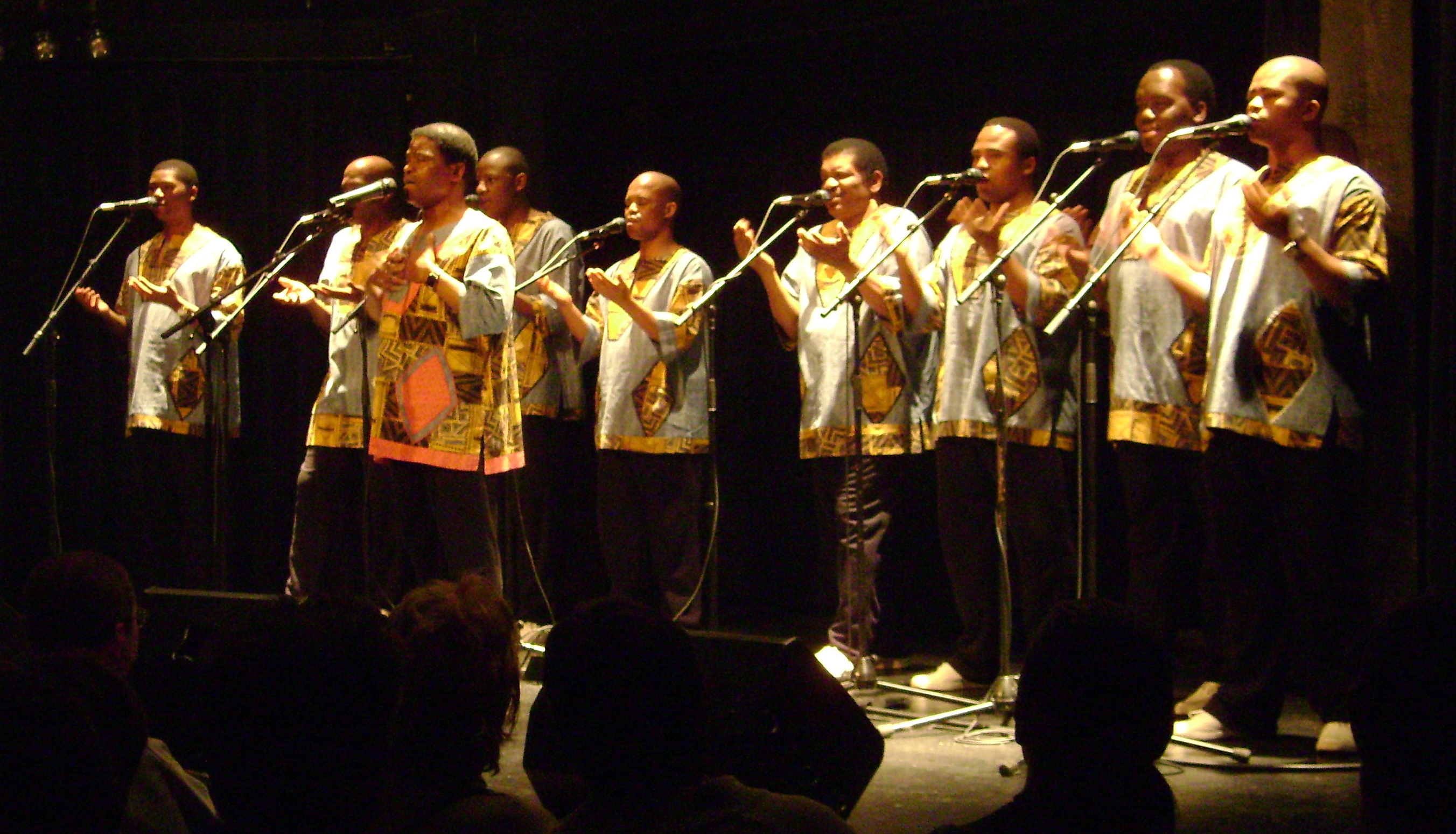
Ladysmith Black Mambazo in 2008 in Innsbruck, Austria

Mbube is a form of South African vocal music, made famous by the South African group Ladysmith Black Mambazo. The word mbube means "Lion" in Zulu. Traditionally performed acappella, the members of the group are male, although a few groups have a female singer. In this form, groups of voices singing homophonically in rhythmic unison are employed to create intricate harmonies and textures.

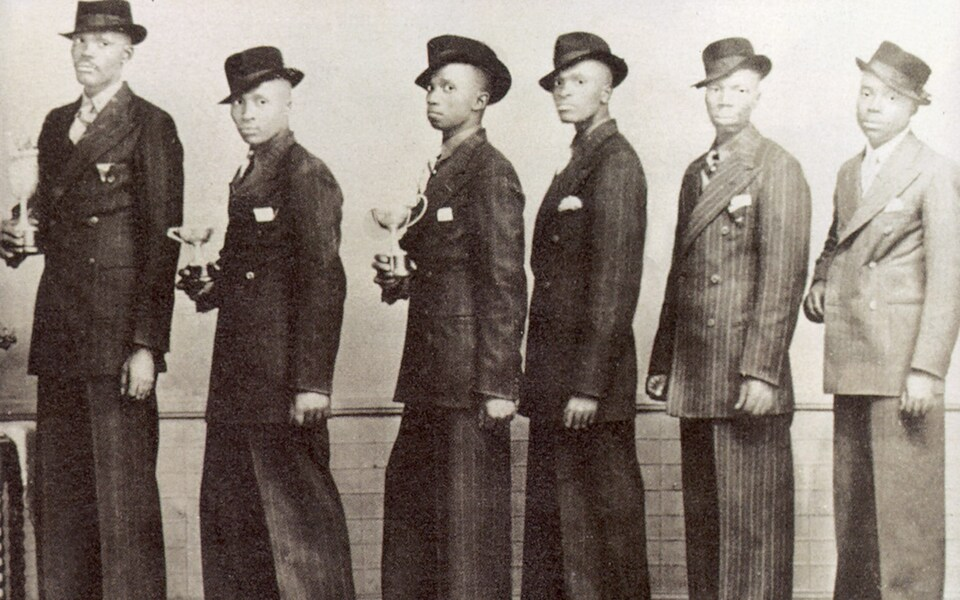
Solomon Linda's Original Evening Birds 1941

== Background ==
In Johannesburg, Solomon Linda, a man from Natal, created one of the most famous African songs, "Mbube", which eventually became its own genre. In 1933 Linda began singing with a group of friends called the Evening Birds. In 1939, they recorded a few tracks for Gallo Records when Linda improvised the first 15 notes of a song they called "Mbube". The success of this song led to the conception of a whole new genre, characterized by a loud and powerful cappella four part harmony, accompanied by dancing. The song was later made internationally famous, by The Weavers as "Wimoweh" in 1948 and then as "The Lion Sleeps Tonight" by The Tokens in 1961. Miriam Makeba's recording of "The Lion Sleeps Tonight" in the 1960s helped popularize the genre and establish the singing tradition.

Associated with poor migrant workers, the origins of Mbube can be traced back to the 1920s in the Natal region when the area became heavily industrialized with coal mines and factories. According to Joseph Shabalala (leader and founder of Ladysmith Black Mambazo), young South African Zulu men from nearby towns and villages began to flock to this area to find work, often in mines. These men brought with them their own cultures and, in order to preserve a sense of community, formed choirs. These male workers were often lodging in hostels where they created a weekend social life that revolved around singing and dancing. There were competitions where the best groups would showcase their talents and a winner would be awarded not with money, but honor. As these competitions became more popular so did this new style of music. It spread to Johannesburg, one of the largest South African cities. Mbube is a precursor to the more currently popular African choral genres mbaqanga and iscathamiya. Since the formation of Ladysmith Black Mambazo, the mbube has fallen out of style in favor of isicathamiya, which is a softer, lighter genre.

== General sources ==
- Mbube Roots, Rounder Records #5025
- AMARYONI Artist Biography African Cream Music, Johannesburg, South Africa. Retrieved 14 November 2008
- Broughton, Simon, and Kim Burton. World Music: the Rough Guide. London: Rough Guides, 1994. Print
- Malan, Rian (25 May 2000). "In the Jungle". Rolling Stone.
- "Africa". The Harvard Dictionary of Music. Harvard University Press. 2003. Def. 5, Southern Africa.
- Johnson, Keith. "Mbube". AllMusic. N.p., n.d. Web. 31 Mar. 2011.
- Wassel, Deborah. "From Mbube to Wimoweh: African Folk Music in Dual Systems of Law". Fordham Intellectual Property, Media & Entertainment Law Journal XX.1 (2009): 290–326. Fordham Law Blog. Web. 31 Mar. 2011.
