= Joseph Shabalala =

South African singer and musician (1940–2020)

- Born: Bhekizizwe Joseph Siphatimandla Mxoveni Mshengu Shabalala (Note: Also given as Bhekizizwe Joseph Siphatimandia Mxoveni Mshengu Bigboy Shabalala and Bhekizizwe Joseph Siphathimandla Bigboy Mxoveni Shabalala.); 28 August 1940; Ladysmith, South Africa
- Died: 11 February 2020 (aged 79) Pretoria, South Africa
- Occupations: Singer; composer; musical director
- Years active: 1960–2014
- Formerly of: Ladysmith Black Mambazo

Bhekizizwe Joseph Shabalala (28 August 1940 – 11 February 2020) was a South African singer and musician who was the founder and musical director of the choral group Ladysmith Black Mambazo.

== Early life and career ==
Bhekizizwe Joseph Shabalala was born on 28 August 1940, in the town of Ladysmith (eMnambithi district) in the KwaZulu-Natal region of South Africa. His parents, Jonathan Mluwane Shabalala and Nomandla Elina Shabalala, raised Joseph and his six siblings on a white-owned farm called Tugela. His father died in the late 1940s; Joseph, being the eldest, had to take care of the family. He left the farm, however, in 1958 to search for work in the nearby city of Durban.

During this time, he was spotted by a well-known group, the Durban Choir, after he delighted audiences with his smooth guitar playing and soprano voice. When he joined the choir, he attempted to teach them some of his new compositions, namely his first song "Nomathemba" (which was made into a play in 1995). They refused, and so he left them after only two years.

In 1958 Shabalala discovered an isicathamiya group, The Highlanders, led by his hero Galiyane Hlatshwayo. Hlatshwayo was the man who encouraged Shabalala to use his voice powerfully. Shabalala formed his own group the following year 1959, Ezimnyama ("The Black Ones"). A series of dreams he had in his sleep in December 1960 was a major turning point in the formation of the group; when he saw how well his group did in the once-weekly isicathamiya competitions, he renamed them Ladysmith Black Mambazo, "Mambazo" meaning axe, referring to how the group chopped down the other choirs by winning almost every time.

After local radio airplay (on the SABC station Radio Zulu), Shabalala accepted a recording contract that was offered in 1972 by Gallo Music producer West Nkosi. The group sold over 40,000 copies of their first album Imbongi. and continued to do so through other recordings. In 1976, he became a Christian, and the songs in the Mambazo repertoire were shuffled to one side to include generalized Christian, Methodist, and Zionist hymns sung in the Zulu language.

== Rising to stardom ==
In 1986, Paul Simon travelled to South Africa to collaborate with South African artists for his upcoming Graceland album. Simon collaborated with Shabalala and the group, and co-composed the now-famous song, "Homeless". The group's popularity spread all over the world, and since then they have sold records popular enough to earn platinum disc certification. In 1987, the group won their first solo Grammy Award for Shaka Zulu. Since then, they have won a second Grammy, and have been nominated more than ten times for the award. Following the worldwide success of Graceland, Shabalala began composing more songs in English (prior to this they had only recorded two in English and one in German).

On the night of 10 December 1991, his brother and fellow member Headman Shabalala was killed by an off-duty white security guard near the town of Ladysmith. The death was thought to be a racial murder. Joseph, helped by his beliefs, persevered, and the group continued; the members now included his brother Jockey, close relatives Albert and Abednego Mazibuko, Russel Mthembu and Jabulani Dubazana and his sons Sibongiseni, Thamsanqa, Thulani and Msizi. Nevertheless, tragedy returned. In May 2002, Shabalala's wife of 30 years, Nellie, was shot and killed by an assailant outside the couple's home in Clermont, KwaZulu-Natal. Shabalala's hand was wounded in his attempt to protect his wife. Mboneni Mdunge was convicted of the murder and sentenced to life in prison. At the same trial, Shabalala's son Nkosinathi Vivian Shabalala (Nellie's stepson) was charged, tried, and acquitted on charges of having paid Mdunge for Nellie's murder.

== Later life and death ==
The next album from the group, Wenyukela, was expected to have a solemn tone in the wake of Nellie's murder. Indeed, it did, including a tribute to Nellie by her grandsons Gagamela and Babuyile Shabalala. The track encouraged their grandfather to carry on, while assuring him that "S-H-A-B-A-L-A-L-A will live on."

Six months after Nellie's death, Joseph Shabalala married Thoko Maduna, which was characterized as a "controversial stunt” by the South African press. Shabalala continued with his music career and established the Ladysmith Black Mambazo Foundation, a music academy to promote and teach isicathamiya music to young South African children.

Tragedy struck again in June 2004 when his brother (and former Mambazo member) Ben Shabalala was shot and killed by an unknown individual whilst driving his two children to school. In February 2006, his brother Jockey (Joseph's only remaining brother in the group by this time), died of natural causes at his home in Ladysmith, South Africa.

In January 2008, Shabalala announced that his youngest son, Thamsanqa, would take over as leader of Ladysmith Black Mambazo when the time came for Joseph to retire from international touring. That time came in early 2014, when Shabalala sat out a three-month tour, although he continued to sing on special occasions.

Shabalala died in Pretoria, South Africa, on 11 February 2020 at the age of 79.

== See also ==
- Ladysmith Black Mambazo Foundation
- Mahlathini and the Mahotella Queens
