= Isicathamiya =

South African singing style

- Stylistic origins: Mbube
- Cultural origins: 20th century, South Africa

Regional scenes
- Johannesburg; Durban

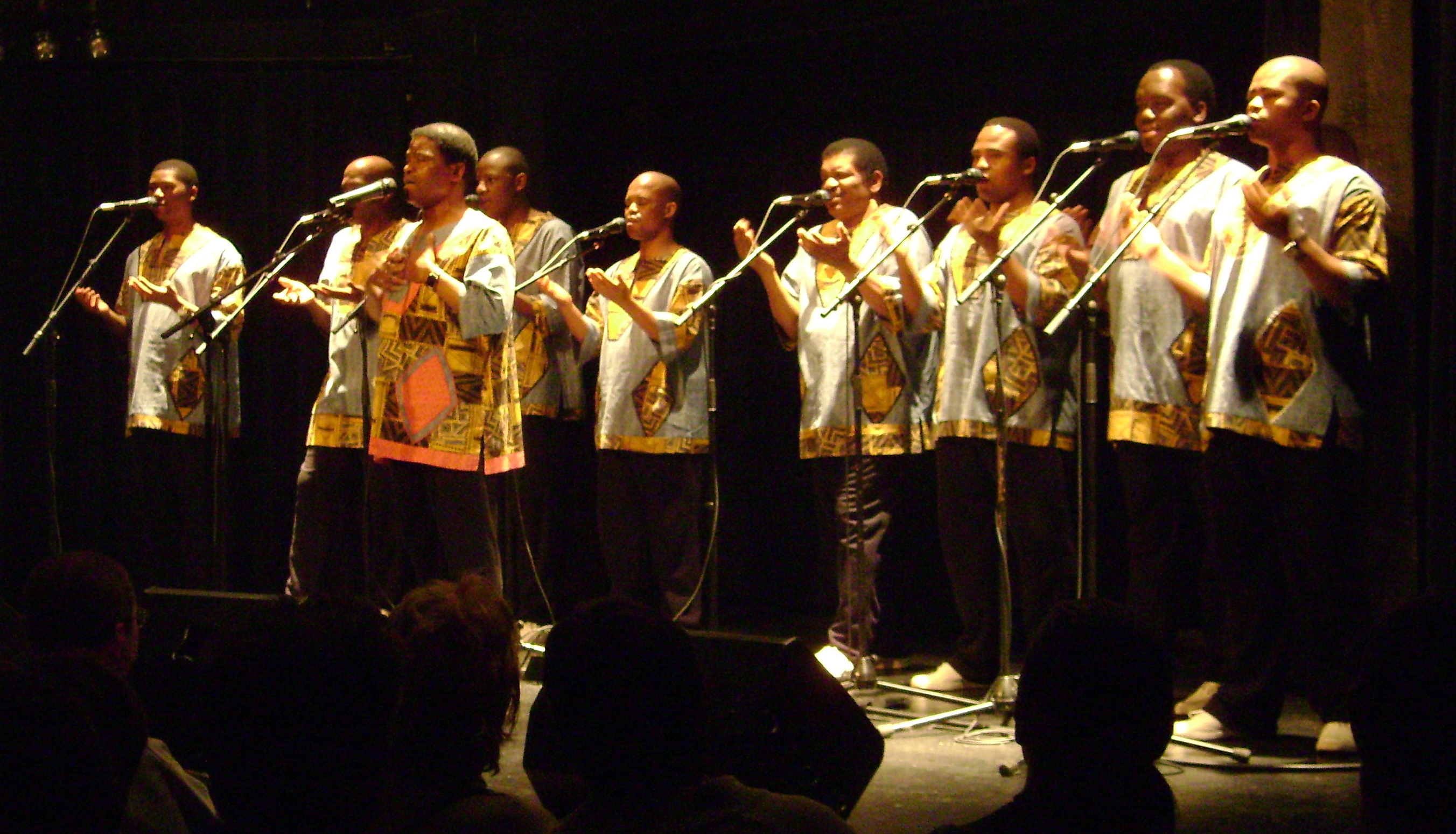
Ladysmith Black Mambazo

Isicathamiya (Zulu pronunciation: [isikǀatʰamija], where the c represents a tenuis dental click) is a singing style that originated from the Zulu people, a South African ethnic group. In European understanding, a cappella is also used to describe this form of singing.

The word itself does not have a literal translation; it is derived from the Zulu verb -cathama, which means 'walking softly', or 'tread carefully'. Isicathamiya contrasts with an earlier name for Zulu a cappella singing, mbube, meaning 'lion'. The change in name marks a transition in the style of the music: traditionally, music described as mbube is sung loudly and powerfully, while isicathamiya focuses more on achieving a harmonious blend between the voices. The name also refers to the style's tightly choreographed dance moves that keep the singers on their toes.

South African singing groups such as Ladysmith Black Mambazo demonstrate this style. Isicathamiya choirs are traditionally all male. Its roots reach back before the turn of the 20th century, when numerous men left the homelands to search for work in the cities. As many of the tribesmen became urbanized, the style was forgotten through much of the 20th century.

Today, isicathamiya competitions in Johannesburg and Durban take place on Saturday nights, with up to 30 choirs performing from 8 o'clock at night to 8 o'clock the following morning.

== Origin: traditional music, culture and spirituality ==
Although the style exponentially emerged in the 20th century, specifically in the 1920s and 1930s, many academics argue it can be traced back to the end of the 19th century. They believe the roots of isicathamiya are found in the American minstrels and ragtime US vaudeville troupes that toured South Africa extensively in 1860. Isicathamiya would have merged from a combination of minstrel inspired songs and Zulu traditional music.

Culturally and traditionally, isicathamiya is influenced by Zulu indigenous beliefs such as: belief in communalism which is expressed in the Zulu dictum, "umuntu, ngumuntu, ngabantu", competition, strength and power associated with animals, reverence of the fireplace as a resource for food and warmth and, dreams for communicating with ancestors. The expression "umuntu, ngumuntu, ngabantu" which means "a person is a person because of other people", dominates Zulu social organization and is used as a tool to strengthen social harmony. In the Zulu community, competition is highly valued, especially with music, as it is seen as a social issue which is subject to competition. It is also perceived as a public platform in which people can establish a concept of identity in a community. Isicathamiya performers improve their image by winning competitions. In Zulu folklore, bulls are a common symbol of power and masculinity. Other wild animals such as snakes, crocodiles, tigers and lions are expressions of power relations and assertion of power in competitive isicathamiya competitions. Early isicathamiya groups were named after animals such as Empangeni Home Tigers and Brave Lion Singers.

The fireplace is used metaphorically for the "cooking of songs" in isicathamiya stage performances. Emphasis is placed on the social organization based on the Zulu indigenous residence which took form in a circular bee-hive grass hut and at the center the head of surrounded by wives and children. The same formation takes places when isicathamiya songs were created with the leader in the center of the group. Dreams were an essential part of communicating with ancestors and formed part of a deeply rooted Zulu religious process. Some isicathamiya musicians claim some of their songs were created in the spiritual realm given to them by ancestors. Joseph Shabalala of Ladysmith Black Mambazo claimed he was inspired by dreams whereby, for six months in the 1960s, he was visited by voices. These were spiritual elders who were singing in the isicathamiya style. He experienced a final examination where each of the twenty-four elders asked him a musical question and Shabalala achieved a perfect score.

== Pre- and post-Ladysmith ==
In the 1980s, isicathamiya competitions were held in male hostels such as Glebeland, in Umlazi, one of townships in Durban. The groups were allowed to perform two songs adhering to the competition formation.

Joseph Shabalala formed Ladysmith Black Mambazo and had the opportunity to work with Paul Simon on the Graceland album which included two tracks, "Homeless" and "Diamonds on Soles of her Shoes", which gained the group international recognition. The influence Joseph Shabalala had would change the context of isicathamiya in the late 20th century. Shabalala, Bongani Mthethwa and Paulos Msimango formed an organization called South African Traditional Music Association to help reclaim isicathamiya as a form of traditional music. Competitions were no longer in hostels but at the YMCA in Beatrice Street in the city center of Durban.

The change in venues allowed for variation in the basic theme of the competitions. A competition for the best dressed man was implemented and on occasion for the best dressed woman. Furthermore, all who registered to compete now paid a voluntary amount to the event conveners and the contribution of each group would be announced as they entered the hall.

Shabalala recognized the significance of his position on a global scale and would honor the community by conducting workshops for aspiring isicathamiya groups. Ladysmith Black Mambazo addressed pressing issues in South African in the 1990s such as HIV/AIDS, crime, violence and rape. The group would honor prominent members of South African society such as Nelson Mandela and Archbishop Desmond Tutu.

The level of interaction the group uses with the audience has grown vastly. Shabalala communicated with the audience beyond the musical and dance aspects. There was a shift in language usage, no longer restricted to Zulu, Shabalala would recite the words to "Homeless" to teach the audience.

Shabalala continued to extend the boundaries of isicathamiya formalities by introducing Zulu maskanda (traditional musicians playing on European instruments, guitar and concertina) to open for Shabalala and his group.

== Competition etiquette and formalities ==
The core of isicathamiya were the all-night choir competitions that took place during the weekends in Johannesburg and Durban. Competitions were held all night long due to the number of choirs that would sign up at the start of the evening. Each choir had a group leader who was responsible for signing up the group and paying an entrance fee which would contribute to the monetary prize at the end of the evening.

=== Dress code ===
The isicathamiya groups dressed in suits, with white gloves, sparkling white shirts, shiny black shoes and red socks. The leader dressed in opposing colours from the group.

=== Formation ===
Before the group enters the stage, there would be a moment of pre-performance prayer with the group gathered in a circle praying for spiritual guidance. This circle formation is reminiscent of the cattle enclosure of a Zulu village, a sacred space where the men could feel the presence of their ancestors and pray to them.

The isicathamiya groups enter the stage for the competition and start with the group standing in a semicircle with the leader in front of the group. The group faces the judges and audience. Usually the first song is sung with the group standing still under the instruction of the leader in a makwaya (choral) setting. In the second half the group would incorporate leg dances or i-steps with their bodies synchronized to the rhythm of the song. At this point, the participants' girlfriends or wives would come up to support the group.

== Style and composition ==
The leader of the group is often the founder and the composer. Often the migrant workers are not educated in musical notation, and so use a different compositional technique. Ladysmith Black Mambazo's Shabalala has said he composes when his body is sleeping and his spirit is at work. Typically the songs are written in response to what is troubling him at that moment, from love to politics and religious matters, but mostly social and political issues concerning life for black South Africans in KwaZulu-Natal. Shabalala acknowledges the group used their music to educate the audiences they would encounter.

Shabalala shares how he learned to compose in the isicathamiya style; as it was through dreams where he heard voices from spiritual elders. This is common among Zulu traditionalists and isicathamiya composers.

Stylistically, isicathamiya is characterized by male voices performing a capella, with the SATB formation (one leading voice, a tenor, followed by one soprano (falsetto), one alto and the rest singing bass); however, in some cases there are recordings with banjo or piano as it was thought the instruments would appeal to the Black elite. A good isicathamiya performance includes call and response and multilayered vocal polyphony.

== Worldwide recognition ==
The Western breakthrough for this style was Paul Simon's album Graceland (1986), which featured such tracks as "Homeless" and "Diamonds on the Soles of her Shoes", in which Simon was backed by the haunting voices of Ladysmith Black Mambazo. The group itself has since gone on to enjoy great popularity and recognition, including songs such as "Hello My Baby" and also recordings of Bob Dylan's "Knockin' on Heaven's Door", the Rugby World Cup theme "The World in Union", and "Mbube" (a song composed in 1939 by Zulu worker Solomon Linda – The song, with additional lyrics, is also known as "The Lion Sleeps Tonight") — this last having given its name, meaning lion, to the genre. "Mambazo" members are also born again Christians and frequently demonstrate the close relationship between isicathamiya and gospel music in songs such as "Amazing Grace" and various Zulu hymns. "Mambazo" is the primary a cappella group from South Africa to garner worldwide attention; all other widely known South African musicians use some form of instrumental backing, though some groups such as the Mahotella Queens, who sing against an electric guitar "Mbaqanga" melody, occasionally sing without instrumental backing.
