= Afterglow Live =

Live album by Sarah McLachlan

Live album by Sarah McLachlan
- Released: November 23, 2004
- Recorded: August 19–20, 2004
- Genre: Singer-songwriter
- Label: Nettwerk (Canada), Arista
- Producer: Natalie Johns

Sarah McLachlan chronology
Afterglow (2003)	Afterglow Live (2004)	iTunes Originals – Sarah McLachlan (2005)

Professional ratings
Review scores
Source	Rating
Allmusic	3/5 stars

Afterglow Live is a 2004 live CD and DVD package by Sarah McLachlan.

== DVD track listing ==
All songs written by Sarah McLachlan, except where noted.

1. "Fallen" – 4:19
2. "World on Fire" – 5:07 (McLachlan, Pierre Marchand)
3. "Adia" – 4:01
4. "Hold On" – 5:55
5. "Perfect Girl" – 4:36 (McLachlan, Marchand)
6. "Drifting" – 6:04
7. "Push" – 4:12
8. "I Will Remember You" – 4:16 (McLachlan, Seamus Egan, Merenda)
9. "Ice" – 4:43
10. "Wait" – 4:51
11. "Witness" – 6:15 (McLachlan, Marchand)
12. "Answer" – 3:59
13. "Angel" – 5:45
14. "Fear" – 5:15
15. "Train Wreck" – 3:41
16. "Building a Mystery" – 4:52 (McLachlan, Marchand)
17. "Sweet Surrender" – 4:19
18. "Possession" – 6:32
19. "Blackbird" – 3:02 (John Lennon, Paul McCartney)
20. "Ice Cream" – 3:28
21. "Stupid" – 5:52
22. "Fumbling Towards Ecstasy" – 7:03 (McLachlan, Marchand)
23. "Dirty Little Secret" – 5:53

== CD track listing ==
All tracks are written by Sarah McLachlan, except where noted.

No.	Title	Writer(s)	Original Album	Length
1.	"Fallen"		Afterglow	3:51
2.	"World on Fire"	McLachlan, Pierre Marchand	Afterglow	4:13
3.	"Adia"		Surfacing	4:03
4.	"Hold On"		Fumbling Towards Ecstasy	5:53
5.	"Perfect Girl"	McLachlan, Marchand	Afterglow	4:36
6.	"Push"		Afterglow	4:04
7.	"I Will Remember You"	McLachlan, Seamus Egan, Dave Merenda	Mirroball	3:37
8.	"Witness"	McLachlan, Marchand	Surfacing	6:02
9.	"Answer"		Afterglow	3:46
10.	"Angel"		Surfacing	5:30
11.	"Train Wreck"		Afterglow	3:54
12.	"Building a Mystery"	McLachlan, Marchand	Surfacing	4:06
13.	"Sweet Surrender"		Surfacing	3:59
14.	"Stupid"		Afterglow	3:35
15.	"Dirty Little Secret"		Afterglow	6:32

== Personnel ==
- Sarah McLachlan – vocals, guitar, piano
- Ashwin Sood – vocals, drums, percussion
- Luke Doucet – vocals, guitar
- Sean Ashby – vocals, guitar
- Vincent Jones – vocals, keyboards
- Brian Minato – vocals, bass guitar
- Dave Kershaw – keyboards, bass guitar
- Kathryn Rose – vocals

== Charts ==
=== Weekly charts ===
DVD chart (2004–05)	Peak position
US Top Music Videos (Billboard)	5
Album chart (2004)	Peak position
US Billboard 200	107

=== Year-end charts ===
Chart (2005)	Position
US Top Music Videos (Billboard)	20

== Certifications and sales ==
Region	Certification	Certified units/sales
DVD
United States (RIAA)	2× Platinum	200,000^{^}
Album
Canada (Music Canada)	Gold	50,000^{^}
^{^} Shipments figures based on certification alone.

== Afterglow Remixes Digital EP ==
Afterglow Remixes Digital EP

EP by Sarah McLachlan
- Released: 2003
- Recorded: 2002–2003
- Genre: Pop
- Label: Nettwerk (Canada), Arista
- Producer: Pierre Marchand

Afterglow Remixes Digital EP was a free, download-only EP released simultaneously with Afterglow Live. Customers who bought the album in stores were invited to visit www.download-disc.com and use a unique code to download rare remixes from the Afterglow album. Each track was available in Windows WMA audio format only and included DRM which limited the redistribution of the tracks, although burning the tracks to a CD was encouraged. Customers were given an empty CD slipcase in which to place the CD they burned.

=== Track listing ===
1. "World on Fire" (Junkie XL Mix)
2. "Stupid" (Dusted Mix) – 3:51
3. "Fallen" (Gabriel & Dresden Anti-Gravity Mix) – 10:26
4. "World on Fire" (Solarstone "Afterhours" Mix) – 8:42

Track 1: Written by Sarah McLachlan and Pierre Marchand. Remix & additional production by Junkie XL. Track 2: Written by Sarah McLachlan. Remix & additional production by Rollo & Mark Bates (Dusted). Track 3: Written by Sarah McLachlan. Remix & additional production by Josh Gabriel & Dave Dresden. Track 4: Written by Sarah McLachlan and Pierre Marchand. Remix & additional production by Rich Mowatt & Andy Bury.
