= Bloom: Remix Album =

Remix album by Sarah McLachlan
- Released: 6 September 2005
- Recorded: 1988–2005
- Genre: Electronic dance
- Length: 59:16
- Labels: Nettwerk (Canada); Arista (US)
- Producers: Rollo Armstrong; DJ Hyper; Gabriel & Dresden; Junior Boys; Junkie XL; Pierre Marchand; Tom Middleton; Talvin Singh; Sly and Robbie; Thievery Corporation; Satoshi Tomiie; will.i.am; The album was produced and A&R credited to George Maniatis

Sarah McLachlan chronology
iTunes Originals – Sarah McLachlan (2005)	Bloom: Remix Album (2005)	Mirrorball: The Complete Concert (2006)

Professional ratings
Review scores
Source	Rating
AllMusic	link
Metro Weekly	link
PopMatters	link
Rolling Stone	link

Bloom: Remix Album is the second remix album by Canadian singer Sarah McLachlan, released in North America on 6 September 2005 by Nettwerk in Canada and Arista Records in the United States. It includes various dance club versions of McLachlan's songs, remixed by prominent remixers and producers.

== Content ==
Bloom: Remix Album features mainly remixes of songs which originally appeared on McLachlan's 2003 studio album, Afterglow. It includes already known remixes of three singles: "Fallen", "Stupid" and "World on Fire", and new remixes of "Train Wreck", "Answer" and "Dirty Little Secret". The album also contains new remixes of two songs taken from Fumbling Towards Ecstasy (1993) and of her debut single "Vox" from Touch (1988). Bloom: Remix Album also features a remix of a new song, "Just Like Me" by DMC featuring Mclachlan. Songs were remixed by Junkie XL, Rollo Armstrong from Faithless, Tom Middleton, Thievery Corporation, DJ Hyper, Sly and Robbie, will.i.am, Talvin Singh, Gabriel & Dresden and Junior Boys. The Japanese edition also includes "Fallen" (Satoshi Tomiie Mix). The Bloom album was overseen and produced by George Maniatis.

In 2008, "Dirty Little Secret" (Thievery Corporation Mix) was included on the Bones: Original Television Soundtrack.

== Commercial performance ==
The album peaked at number twenty-two in Canada. In the United States, it reached number two on the Dance/Electronic Albums and number seventy-six on the Billboard 200. It was held from the top on the Dance/Electronic Albums by Demon Days by the Gorillaz.

In 2004, "Fallen" and "World on Fire" already peaked on the US Dance Club Songs at number three and two, respectively.

== Track listing ==
No.	Title	Writer(s)	Album	Length
1.	"World on Fire" (Junkie XL Club Mix / GM Edit)	Sarah McLachlan; Pierre Marchand	Afterglow	6:29
2.	"Ice" (Dusted Mix)	McLachlan	Fumbling Towards Ecstasy	5:46
3.	"Vox" (Tom Middleton Mix)	McLachlan	Touch	6:54
4.	"Dirty Little Secret" (Thievery Corporation Mix)	McLachlan	Afterglow	4:00
5.	"Stupid" (Hyper Remix)	McLachlan	Afterglow	7:53
6.	"Train Wreck" (Sly & Robbie Mix)	McLachlan	Afterglow	4:38
7.	"Just Like Me" (DMC featuring Sarah Mclachlan) (will.i.am of Black Eyed Peas Mix)	Darryl McDaniels; Harry Chapin; Sandra Chapin	Checks Thugs and Rock n Roll	5:04
8.	"Answer" (Talvin Singh Mix)	McLachlan	Afterglow	4:24
9.	"Fallen" (Gabriel & Dresden Anti-Gravity Mix / GM Edit)	McLachlan	Afterglow	7:58
10.	"Fumbling Towards Ecstasy" (Junior Boys Mix)	McLachlan; Marchand	Fumbling Towards Ecstasy	6:07

Japanese edition bonus track
No.	Title	Writer(s)	Album	Length
11.	"Fallen" (Satoshi Tomiie Mix)	McLachlan	Afterglow	10:03

Digital edition bonus track
No.	Title	Writer(s)	Album	Length
12.	"Vox" (Tom Middleton Dub)	McLachlan	Touch	9:02

== Charts ==
=== Weekly charts ===
Chart (2005)	Peak position
Australian Albums (ARIA)	147
Canadian Albums (Billboard)	22
US Billboard 200	76
US Top Dance Albums (Billboard)	2

=== Year-end charts ===
Chart (2005)	Position
US Top Dance/Electronic Albums (Billboard)	17

== See also ==
- Remixed
