= Remixed (Sarah McLachlan album) =

2001 remix album by Sarah McLachlan

Remix album by Sarah McLachlan
- Released: 26 June 2001
- Recorded: 1991–2001
- Genre: Electronic dance
- Length: 72:49
- Labels: Nettwerk (Canada); Arista (US)
- Producers: BT; Delerium; Dusted; Fade; Hybrid; Pierre Marchand; William Orbit; Rabbit in the Moon; Tiësto; The album was produced and A&R credited to George Maniatis

Sarah McLachlan chronology
Mirrorball (1999)	Remixed (2001)	Afterglow (2003)

Professional ratings
Review scores
Source	Rating
AllMusic	3/5 stars

Remixed is the first remix album by Canadian singer Sarah McLachlan, released in Canada on 4 July 2001 by Nettwerk and in the United States on 16 December 2003 by Arista Records. It includes various dance club versions of McLachlan's songs, remixed by DJs such as William Orbit, Tiësto, BT, and Rabbit in the Moon.

== Content ==
Remixed features mostly new remixes of songs which originally appeared on McLachlan's studio albums: Solace (1991), Fumbling Towards Ecstasy (1993) and Surfacing (1997). Three tracks were previously released on club compilations or 12" promotional singles: "Possession" (Rabbit in the Moon Mix) in 1995, "I Love You" (BT Mix) in 2000 and "Sweet Surrender" (DJ Tiësto Mix) in 2000. Remixed also features "Silence" by Delerium and McLachlan, which became one of the greatest trance songs of all time. Here, it was remixed by Tiësto. The remix album was overseen and produced by George Maniatis.

In early 2002, the edit of "Angel" (Dusted Remix) was released on the "Angel" single in the United Kingdom. Later in 2002, the edit of "Fear" (Hybrid's Super Collider Mix) was included on the Roswell soundtrack. Also in 2002, the edit of "Plenty" (Fade Mix) appeared on the second Queer as Folk soundtrack.

== Commercial performance ==
In Canada, the album peaked at number ten in 2001. It was also certified platinum. In the United States, it was released in December 2003 and entered the Dance/Electronic Albums at number one. It stayed on top for four consecutive weeks. On the Billboard 200, Remixed reached number 200. As of January 2005, the album has sold 162,000 copies in the United States.

Several remixes charted over the years on the US Dance Club Songs: "Possession" in 1995 (peak at number thirty), "I Love You" in 2000 (peak at number twenty-three), "Silence" in 2000 (peak at number six) and "Sweet Surrender" in 2001 (also peak at number six). In 2004, "Silence 2004" entered the Dance Club Songs and peaked at number one, becoming McLachlan's first chart-topper there.

== Track listing ==
No.	Title	Writer(s)	Album	Length
1.	"Fear" (Hybrid's Super Collider Mix)	Sarah McLachlan	Fumbling Towards Ecstasy	9:00
2.	"Sweet Surrender" (DJ Tiësto Mix)	McLachlan	Surfacing	7:02
3.	"Angel" (Dusted Remix)	McLachlan	Surfacing	5:28
4.	"I Love You" (BT Mix)	McLachlan	Surfacing	9:01
5.	"Silence" (DJ Tiësto's in Search of Sunrise Remix)	McLachlan; Bill Leeb; Rhys Fulber	Karma	11:32
6.	"Black" (William Orbit Mix)	McLachlan	Solace	7:01
7.	"Possession" (Rabbit in the Moon Mix)	McLachlan	Fumbling Towards Ecstasy	5:51
8.	"Hold On" (BT Mix)	McLachlan	Fumbling Towards Ecstasy	7:44
9.	"Plenty" (Fade Mix)	McLachlan	Fumbling Towards Ecstasy	10:19

== Charts ==
=== Weekly charts ===
Chart (2001–02)	Peak position
Australian Albums (ARIA)	138
Canadian Albums (Billboard)	10
Chart (2003–04)	Peak position
US Billboard 200	200
US Top Dance Albums (Billboard)	1

=== Year-end charts ===
Year-end chart performance for Remixed by Sarah McLachlan
Chart (2001)	Position
Canadian Albums (Nielsen SoundScan)	140

Chart (2004)	Position
US Dance/Electronic Albums (Billboard)	7

== Certifications ==
Region	Certification	Certified units/sales
Canada (Music Canada)	Platinum	100,000^{^}
United States	—	162,000
^{^} Shipments figures based on certification alone.

== See also ==
- Bloom: Remix Album
