= ITunes Originals – Sarah McLachlan =

iTunes Originals – Sarah McLachlan

Compilation album by Sarah McLachlan
- Released: 17 May 2005
- Genre: Pop
- Labels: Nettwerk (Canada); Arista (US)

Sarah McLachlan chronology
Afterglow Live (2004)	iTunes Originals – Sarah McLachlan (2005)	Bloom: Remix Album (2005)

iTunes Originals – Sarah McLachlan is a 2005 digital download-only compilation album by Sarah McLachlan, released exclusively on iTunes. These tracks include interviews, new versions of pre-existing songs not released on any other CD, and original songs that have been released on previous CDs.

The album was the top-selling digital-only album of 2005.

== Track listing ==
1. "iTunes Originals" 0:04
2. "Adia" 4:02
3. "Writing the First Song" 1:14
4. "Out of the Shadows" 4:58
5. "The First Song That Made Me Feel Good About Being a Song Writer" 1:17
6. "Ben's Song" 4:52
7. "A Pivotal Change and a Lesson Learned" 2:27
8. "The Path of Thorns (Terms)" 5:45
9. "A Stalker Song" 2:11
10. "Possession (iTunes Originals Version)" 4:29
11. "A Tragic Love Story" 0:50
12. "Hold On" 4:08
13. "Letting Go" 1:36
14. "Ice Cream (iTunes Originals Version)" 2:30
15. "There's no Mathematical Equation" 0:50
16. "Building A Mystery" 4:06
17. "Angel Emmylou" 1:57
18. "Angel (Live at Lilith Fair, with Emmylou Harris)" 5:55
19. "The First Step Towards Self-Reinvention" 1:26
20. "Fallen (iTunes Originals Version)" 3:32
21. "The First Truly Happy Love Song" 1:46
22. "Push (iTunes Originals Version)" 3:54
23. "Another Afterthought" 1:07
24. "Dirty Little Secret (iTunes Originals Version)" 3:26
