= Chillout 05/The Ultimate Chillout =

Compilation album by various artists
- Released: June 15, 2004
- Genre: Chill-out
- Length: 56:56
- Label: Nettwerk

Chillout chronology
The Best of Chillout: Past and Present (2004)	Chillout 05/The Ultimate Chillout (2004)	Chillout 06/The Ultimate Chillout (2005)

Chillout 05/The Ultimate Chillout (stylized in all lowercase) is a compilation album by Nettwerk Records. It was released on June 15, 2004 as the fourth volume in Nettwerk's The Ultimate Chillout series. The album features popular releases from Nettwerk-signed artists and groups. Some of the acts on the installment include the Alpinestars, Goldfrapp, Sarah McLachlan, and Radiohead. The compilation was released in two unique CD formats on June 15, 2004 in Canada and the United States.

Critically, the album received a mixed response. Despite praise for featuring singles like "Angels" by Wax Poetic and Andain's "You Once Told Me", the inclusion of songs by Starsailor ("Four to the Floor") and Bonobo ("Pick Up") were criticized for straying away from the typical boundaries of the chill-out genre. One critic used Chillout 05/The Ultimate Chillout as an example of the growing popularity of chill-out music in the United States.

== Background and composition ==
On March 31, 2001, Nettwerk Records released Chillout 2001: V.1, the first volume of Chillout, a CD installment series featuring compilations of chill-out songs and music by Nettwerk-signed artists. Additional installments were created over the years, including Chillout 05/The Ultimate Chillout, which was released by Nettwerk on June 15, 2004. It is the fourth overall volume in The Ultimate Chillout portion of Nettwerk's Chillout franchise. Two separate releases occurred for the album: one in the United States where Nettwerk's main offices are located and one in Canada; the album was only made available as a CD. Chillout 05/The Ultimate Chillout was fronted by A&R and project coordinator George Maniatis, who co-authored the album's liner notes. Producer and Nettwerk executive Craig Waddell provided the mastering for the album's twelve songs.

Some of the Nettwerk artists featured on Chillout 05/The Ultimate Chillout include Goldfrapp and Delerium. The collection opens with "Do You Realize?", a 2002 single by The Flaming Lips. Both "Do You Realize?" and Radiohead's "No Surprises" are of the atmospheric rock genre. Lesser known songs from Nettwerk artists like Wax Poetic ("Angels") and Andain ("You Once Told Me") are also included on the album. "Angels" was mixed by Thievery Corporation and features guest vocals from jazz artist Norah Jones while "You Once Told Me" was described as similar in sound to the works of Massive Attack. The compilation also includes several previously unreleased remixes of singles; the Marius de Vries mix of Sarah McLachlan's "World on Fire" and Carmen Rizzo's Chillout mix of Tiësto and Kirsty Hawkshaw's collaboration "Just Be" are exclusive to Chillout 05/The Ultimate Chillout.

== Critical reception ==
Professional ratings
Review scores
Source	Rating
AllMusic	3/5 stars

Chillout 05/The Ultimate Chillout received a mixed rating from David Jeffries, a senior editor for AllMusic. Ultimately, he awarded the compilation three out of five stars. He wrote: "[I] can't blame you if you're cautious about a collection that claims to contain 'the ultimate chillout' and is already up to volume five, but you can't beat Nettwerk's licensing muscle and their taste ain't [sic] bad either." Although he praised the additions of "All That You Give", "Angels", and "You Once Told Me" in the collection, he disregarded "Four the Floor" and "Pick Up" for being hectic and not within the means of the chill-out genre. Jody Rosen, a journalist and music writer for Slate featured the album on a list of chill-out compilations that were popular in the United States. She attributed the popularity of chill-out collections like Chillout 05/The Ultimate Chillout and others due to the introduction of satellite radio channels and outdoor concert festivals devoted to chill-out music debuting throughout the country.

== Track listing ==
Adapted from AllMusic and the album's official liner notes.

No.	Title	Writer(s)	Performer	Length
1.	"Do You Realize?"	The Flaming Lips	The Flaming Lips	3:28
2.	"World on Fire" (Marius de Vries Mix)	Sarah McLachlan; Pierre Marchand	Sarah McLachlan	4:31
3.	"No Surprises"	Colin Greenwood; Jonny Greenwood; Ed O'Brien; Phil Selway; Thom Yorke	Radiohead	3:43
4.	"Four to the Floor" (Thin White Duke Mix)	Starsailor	Starsailor	4:33
5.	"Serenity"	Delerium	Delerium	7:09
6.	"Angels" (featuring Norah Jones) (Thievery Corporation Re-mix)	Ilhan Ersahin; Val Jeanty	Wax Poetic	4:30
7.	"You Once Told Me"	Josh Gabriel; David Penner	Andain	4:06
8.	"All That You Give"	Phil Francis; Jason Swinscoe	The Cinematic Orchestra	5:48
9.	"Burning Up"	Alpinestars	Alpinestars	5:45
10.	"Deep Honey"	Goldfrapp	Goldfrapp	3:53
11.	"Just Be" (featuring Kirsty Hawkshaw) (Carmen Rizzo's Chillout Mix)	Kirsty Hawkshaw; Tyree Judie; Judie Tzuke; James Wiltshire	Tiësto	5:24
12.	"Pick Up"	Simon Green	Bonobo	4:06
Total length:				56:56

== Personnel ==
Credits adapted from the liner notes of Chillout 05/The Ultimate Chillout.

- A&R/final mixing/project coordinator – George Maniatis
- Art direction/CD design – Little C
- Legal – Michelle Dubuc
- Makeup/hair – Shanly McDermid
- Mastering – Craig Waddell
