= Mirrorball (Sarah McLachlan album) =

1999 live album by Sarah McLachlan

Live album by Sarah McLachlan
- Released: 15 June 1999
- Recorded: 20–21 April 1998
- Venue: Rose Garden Arena (Portland, Oregon)
- Genre: Pop
- Length: 65:38
- Labels: Nettwerk (Canada); Arista (US)
- Producer: Pierre Marchand

Sarah McLachlan chronology
Surfacing (1997)	Mirrorball (1999)	Remixed (2001)

Professional ratings
Review scores
Source	Rating
AllMusic	4/5 stars
Rolling Stone	2/5 stars

Mirrorball is a 1999 live album by Sarah McLachlan, compiled from performances during the Surfacing tour in 1997–98. Most of the 14 songs are from McLachlan's two most recent albums at the time, Fumbling Towards Ecstasy and Surfacing. It was a commercial success, entering top 3 on both Billboard 200 and Canadian Albums Chart.

The live performance of "I Will Remember You" was released as a single (the studio version having been released in 1995 and 1996) and was a commercial success, entering top 15 on both Billboard Hot 100 and Canadian Hot 100 charts. It went on to win the Grammy Award for Best Female Pop Vocal Performance.

== Track listing ==
=== Original release ===
No.	Title	Writer(s)	Length
1.	"Building a Mystery"	Sarah McLachlan, Pierre Marchand	4:06
2.	"Hold On"	McLachlan	5:18
3.	"Good Enough"	McLachlan	5:10
4.	"I Will Remember You"	McLachlan, Séamus Egan, Dave Merenda	3:41
5.	"Adia"	McLachlan, Marchand	3:57
6.	"I Love You"	McLachlan	4:28
7.	"Do What You Have to Do"	McLachlan, Colleen Wolstenholme	4:09
8.	"The Path of Thorns (Terms)"	McLachlan	6:03
9.	"Fear"	McLachlan	5:00
10.	"Possession"	McLachlan	5:12
11.	"Sweet Surrender"	McLachlan	3:57
12.	"Ice Cream"	McLachlan	3:02
13.	"Fumbling Towards Ecstasy"	McLachlan, Marchand	5:46
14.	"Angel"	McLachlan	5:49
Total length:			65:38

== Personnel ==
- Sarah McLachlan – vocals, guitars, piano
- Ashwin Sood – drums, percussion, background vocals
- Brian Minato – bass guitar
- David Sinclair – guitars, background vocals
- Sean Ashby – guitars, background vocals
- Camille Henderson – background vocals
- Vincent Jones – keyboards, background vocals

== Charts ==
=== Weekly charts ===
Album chart (1999)	Peak position
Canada Top Albums/CDs (RPM)	1
Canadian Albums (Billboard)	2
New Zealand Albums (RMNZ)	13
US Billboard 200	3
DVD chart (1999)	Peak position
US Top Music Videos (Billboard)	2

=== Year-end charts ===
Chart (1999)	Position
Canada Top Albums/CDs (RPM)	10
US Billboard 200	42
Chart (2000)	Position
Canadian Albums (Nielsen SoundScan)	118
US Billboard 200	126
Chart (2002)	Position
Canadian Alternative Albums (Nielsen SoundScan)	194

== Certifications and sales ==
Region	Certification	Certified units/sales
Canada (Music Canada)	5× Platinum	500,000^{^}
New Zealand (RMNZ)	Gold	7,500^{^}
United Kingdom (BPI)	Silver	60,000^{*}
United States (RIAA)	3× Platinum	3,000,000
DVD
Australia (ARIA)	Platinum	15,000^{^}
Canada (Music Canada)	4× Platinum	40,000^{^}
United States (RIAA)	Platinum	100,000^{^}
^{*} Sales figures based on certification alone.^{^} Shipments figures based on certification alone.

== Mirrorball: The Complete Concert ==
Mirrorball

Live album by Sarah McLachlan
- Released: 3 October 2006
- Recorded: 20–21 April 1998
- Venue: Rose Garden Arena (Portland, Oregon)
- Genre: Singer-songwriter
- Length: 115:05
- Labels: Nettwerk (Canada), Arista
- Producers: Ashwin Sood, Darren Salmieri

Sarah McLachlan chronology
Bloom: Remix Album (2005)	Mirrorball (2006)	Wintersong (2006)

Mirrorball: The Complete Concert is a two-disc expanded version of the album, collecting the same 14 songs and adding nine others. These performances were recorded during the final two nights of McLachlan's Surfacing tour, at the Rose Garden Arena in Portland, Oregon on 20–21 April 1998.

All tracks written by Sarah McLachlan, except where noted.

=== Disc One ===
1. "Building a Mystery" (McLachlan/Marchand) – 4:23
2. "Plenty" – 3:19
3. "Hold On" – 5:10
4. "Good Enough" – 5:00
5. "Do What You Have to Do" (McLachlan/Wolstenholme) – 4:07
6. "Witness" (McLachlan/Marchand) – 4:43
7. "Wait" – 4:48
8. "I Will Remember You" (McLachlan/Egan/Merenda) – 3:33
9. "Ice" – 4:39
10. "I Love You" – 4:25
11. "I Will Not Forget You" (McLachlan, Darren Phillips) – 5:43

=== Disc Two ===
1. "The Path of Thorns (Terms)" – 6:32
2. "Mary" – 4:01
3. "Adia" (McLachlan/Marchand) – 3:51
4. "Fear" – 4:44
5. "Elsewhere" – 5:05
6. "Vox" – 5:11
7. "Into the Fire" (McLachlan/Marchand) – 3:46
8. "Possession" – 5:13
9. "Ice Cream" – 4:38
10. "Sweet Surrender" – 4:07
11. "Fumbling Towards Ecstasy" (McLachlan/Marchand) – 6:04
12. "Angel" – 6:11
