= Chillout 06/The Ultimate Chillout =

Compilation album by various artists
- Released: February 15, 2005
- Genre: Chill-out
- Length: 68:33
- Label: Nettwerk

Chillout chronology
Chillout 05/The Ultimate Chillout (2004)	Chillout 06/The Ultimate Chillout (2005)	Chillout 2: A Nettwerk Escape (2005)

Chillout 06/The Ultimate Chillout (stylized in all lowercase) is a compilation album released by Nettwerk Records. It is the final installment in Nettwerk's The Ultimate Chillout series. The album features popular releases from Nettwerk-signed artists such as Delerium and Sarah McLachlan. It also features lesser-known works from other groups such as Bent, Ivy, and the Perishers. It was released in three formats on February 15, 2005, with two commercial CDs made available in Canada and the United States, and a promotional version used for radio distribution.

Chillout 06/The Ultimate Chillout received mixed reviews from music critics, with the track listing of the album being a popular point of discussion. While the mix of popular and lesser-known artists was appreciated, one critic disapproved of the actual music on the album, claiming that the collection's song rarely fit within the definition of chill-out music.

== Background and composition ==
In 2001, Nettwerk Records released Chillout 2001: V.1, the first installment of Chillout, a CD series featuring a collection of chill-out songs and music by Nettwerk-signed artists. Following additional installments over the years, Nettwerk released Chillout 06/The Ultimate Chillout on February 15, 2005. It serves as the last release from The Ultimate Chillout portion of the Chillout franchise. Three unique releases were created: one in Canada, one in the United States, and an advanced promotional copy used for radio airplay and not suitable for commercial distribution. The release of Chillout 06/The Ultimate Chillout was fronted by A&R and project coordinator George Maniatis, who authored the album's liner notes and an included thank you note. Producer Craig Waddell provided the final mastering of each of the collection's fourteen songs.

As considered standard by PopMatters's John Bergstrom, no Chillout release is "complete without tracks from Delerium and Sarah McLachlan". Chillout 06/The Ultimate Chillout contains corresponding remixes of the songs from these two artists. The album opens with the Slow Rise Mix of Delerium's previously unreleased song "You & I", which was described as "adult alternative" track with vocals comparable to Jon Anderson. The Solarstone Afterhours Mix of "World on Fire" by McLachlan appears as track number three, whereas the Alpha Mix of "Weekends" by The Perishers is the eighth track. The remix of "Weekends" was described as relaxing and the one true chill-out song on Chillout 06/The Ultimate Chillout, with the lead vocalist sounding reminiscent of Peter Gabriel.

Bergstrom also pointed out the inclusion of songs from Nettwerk bands such as Ivy and Bent. The former band contributes "Nothing but the Sky" to the compilation, which is a pop song that is "pleasant and ethereal" and drew comparisons to the works of Lush. Bent's "Silent Life", the compilation's sixth track, combines "warm harmonies, woozy lap steel, and twinkling electronics for a Beatles-on-downers kind of bliss." Despite Chillout 06/The Ultimate Chillout containing songs mostly from the 2000s, it also features Talk Talk's 1986 single "Life's What You Make It".

== Critical reception ==
Professional ratings
Review scores
Source	Rating
AllMusic	3.5/5 stars
PopMatters	3/10 stars

Chillout 06/The Ultimate Chillout divided music critics. David Jeffries, an editor for AllMusic, referred to the album as a well-chosen mix of chill-out songs and awarded it three-and-a-half out of four stars. He pointed out the diversity of the track listing, writing: "But where Nettwerk always succeeds and surprises with their Chillout series is with the lesser knowns. The collection would be less desirable without the lazy indie rock of the Perishers, the trippy [sic] sexiness of Holden & Thompson, and the otherworldly experimentalism of Ulrich Schnauss." Jeffries concluded that because the album is "able to juggle such diverse styles while remaining smooth and hip, it's easy to recommend." Bergstrom from PopMatters was disappointed by the collection, ultimately giving it a 3 out of 10 rating. The magazine's critical consensus read: "It's tough to chill out at 90 beats-per-minute, and the baffling song selection doesn't help. The latest in this usually reliable series should've been called 'Indie Darlings 101'." Bergstrom also considered this installment a new low for the Chillout series, citing that chill-out music is supposed to be "dreamy, mellow, moody, slow, drifty, and, often, instrumental", but Chillout 06/The Ultimate Chillout "rarely meets any of these criteria" and is rather a collection of indie music.

== Track listing ==
Adapted from AllMusic and the album's official liner notes.

No.	Title	Writer(s)	Performer	Length
1.	"You & I" (Slow Rise Mix)	Bill Leeb; Roy Salmon; Zoë Johnston	Delerium	4:54
2.	"On My Own"	Ulrich Schnauss	Ulrich Schnauss	6:29
3.	"World on Fire" (Solarstone Afterhours Mix)	Pierre Marchand; Sarah McLachlan	Sarah McLachlan	8:28
4.	"Against All Odds"	David Charles; Phil Collins	The Postal Service	4:11
5.	"Life's What You Make It"	Tim Friese-Greene; Mark Hollis	Talk Talk	4:10
6.	"Silent Life"	Neil Tolliday; Simon Mills; Steve Edwards	Bent	4:56
7.	"Nothing but the Sky"	Ivy	Ivy	5:00
8.	"Weekends" (Alpha Mix)	Ola Klüft; The Perishers	The Perishers	4:49
9.	"Time Is My Everything"	Ian Brown; Tim Hutton	Ian Brown	3:49
10.	"Come to Me"	James Holden; Julie Thompson	Holden & Thompson	3:31
11.	"Venice Dawn" (Slow Rise Mix)	Shirli McAllen	Hiratzka & Kazell	6:09
12.	"Birthday"	Johnny Dark; Jeremy Greenspan	Junior Boys	4:12
13.	"The Ugly and the Beautiful"	The Real Tuesday Weld	The Real Tuesday Weld	3:03
14.	"Bellissimo"	Oscar Hammerstein II; Dan Brown; Joanna Swan; Nick Pullin; Sigmund Romber	San Ilya	4:52
Total length:				68:33

== Personnel ==
Credits adapted from the liner notes of Chillout 06/The Ultimate Chillout.

- A&R and project coordinator – George Maniatis
- Art direction/CD design – Little C
- Clothes – Chulo Pony
- Final mastering – Craig Waddell
- Legal – Michelle Dubuc
- Makeup/hair – Krista Seller
- Photography – Pete Soos
