= Possession (Sarah McLachlan song) =

1993 single by Sarah McLachlan

- Canadian variant of the standard artwork

Single by Sarah McLachlan

from the album Fumbling Towards Ecstasy
- B-side: "Fear" (Jane's mix)
- Released: 10 September 1993
- Length: 4:37
- Label: Nettwerk
- Songwriter: Sarah McLachlan
- Producer: Pierre Marchand

Sarah McLachlan singles chronology
"Wear Your Love Like Heaven" (1992)	"Possession" (1993)	"Hold On" (1994)

"Possession" is a song by Canadian singer-songwriter Sarah McLachlan, and was the first single from her album Fumbling Towards Ecstasy. It was written and composed by McLachlan and produced by Pierre Marchand. The song appears twice on the album: once as the opening track and again as a hidden track at the end, which is a solo piano version. "Possession" takes place from the viewpoint of a man obsessed with a woman and was inspired by consistent fan letters to McLachlan some time before the writing of the song. The most famous ones are from a computer programmer from Ottawa, Ontario, named Uwe Vandrei, who sued McLachlan for using his words without crediting him. However, Vandrei died by suicide before the case could ever be taken to court.

"Possession" was released in Canada on 10 September 1993 by Nettwerk Records and peaked at number 26 on the country's RPM 100 Hit Tracks chart, making it the second-highest-charting single from the album, after "Good Enough". It was also successful on US alternative radio, peaking at number four on the Billboard Modern Rock Tracks chart, and appeared on four other Billboard charts between 1994 and 1999. The main recording of "Possession" appeared on the 2008 compilation album Closer: The Best of Sarah McLachlan, and McLachlan has also released live, alternate, and remixed versions of the song.

== Inspiration ==
The song was inspired by McLachlan's reaction to two deranged fans, both of whom had concocted a fantasy in which they were already in a relationship with her. Of the two, the more famous is Uwe Vandrei, an Ottawa, Ontario native who sued McLachlan in 1994, alleging that his love letters to her had been the basis of "Possession". Vandrei had written and sent McLachlan love poems, although there is no direct connection between those poems and the lyrics of "Possession". Vandrei's lawsuit never came to trial as he died by suicide in late 1994.

In an interview with Rolling Stone three years later, McLachlan said, "And this one person wasn't the only guy ... there were a lot of letters from other people saying the same kind of thing ... Writing the song 'Possession' was very therapeutic." She also stated that, since the release of "Possession", she had stopped getting stalker-type fan letters, for which she was grateful.

== Music videos ==
=== Canadian version ===
The original version of the video features a remixed background track and depicts Sarah McLachlan wrapped in white cloth, as Eve, Potiphar's wife, and other such biblical references, depicting vanity, deceit, corruption, intimacy and other taboos of conservative society. As McLachlan explained:

Oh it's so lofty, it's pompous now. I was trying to dispel that by showing a bunch of female archetypes using historical paintings, 'Venus', 'Adam and Eve', 'Salome's Last Dance'. I wanted to show all women possessing all these different archetypes. I also had myself suspended in the air and wrapped in gauze, as if my personality and my sexuality were bound. Throughout the video I was being unraveled by unseen forces, and I came out in the end strong and free and – Ta Da! – there I was my own self. Yes, it was pretty lofty [...] and the label told me...

This video was directed by McLachlan herself, and features her friends and band members.

=== US version ===
The video for the US market released in 1994 features the original album version of the song being played by McLachlan and her band in a cathedral-style hall. It was directed by Julie Hermelin.

== Track listings ==
Nettwerk / W2-6319 (Canada)

1. "Possession" (version I)
2. "Possession" (version II)
3. "Fear" (Jane's mix)
- Version II remixed by John Fryer; remix also featured on the "I Will Remember You" single.

Arista / 07822-12662-2 (US)

1. "Possession"
2. "Fear" (Jane's mix)
3. "Mary" (early version)
4. "Black" (live at Harbourfront, Toronto), taken from Live EP

== Charts ==
=== Weekly charts ===
Chart (1993–1999)	Peak position
Australia (ARIA)	129
Canada Top Singles (RPM)	26
US Billboard Hot 100	73
US Adult Alternative Airplay (Billboard)	19
US Adult Alternative Airplay (Billboard) Live	10
US Adult Pop Airplay (Billboard)	19
US Alternative Airplay (Billboard)	4
US Dance Club Songs (Billboard)	30

=== Year-end charts ===
Chart (1994)	Position
US Modern Rock Tracks (Billboard)	27

== Other versions ==
In addition to the two different versions of "Possession" appearing on the Fumbling Towards Ecstasy album, a live recording of the song is available on McLachlan's 1999 live concert album Mirrorball. A fourth version, the Rabbit in the Moon remix, is available on two different McLachlan remix albums: Rarities, B-Sides and Other Stuff and Remixed. McLachlan recorded another version of the song for the 2005 iTunes-only digital album iTunes Originals – Sarah McLachlan.

== Cover versions ==
- British trance act Transfer released a dance version of "Possession" in 2001.
- The Canadian alternative metal band Evans Blue covered "Possession" on their 2006 debut album The Melody and the Energetic Nature of Volume.
- The German gothic metal rock band ASP covered "Possession" on their EP Werben.
- Smile Empty Soul included a cover of "Possession" on their 2007 EP B-Sides.
- The American alternative rock band Metropolis America released a version of “Possession” in 2011.
- Canadian hard rock/metal band Hellrazor covered "Possession" on their 2020 Hero No More album.
