= ITunes Originals =

Album series by iTunes

iTunes Originals is a series of digital releases that were only made available through Apple's iTunes Store. It was developed by iTunes executive Alex Luke who also developed Apple's "Live From" and "Single of the Week" programs. Each release features the music of a single artist. The releases typically contain more than twenty tracks (some more than thirty), which include music from the artist's body of releases, new recordings (of both previously released and sometimes unreleased songs) specifically for the iTunes Originals, and spoken word tracks that explore the artist's history and work, and/or discuss the next song. Some releases have also included video, both previously released, and originally created for the iTunes Originals. The songs recorded exclusively for the albums are usually recorded live in a recording studio.

Most iTunes Originals albums are available in the United States iTunes Store, with availability in other countries' music stores varying with each release. Occasionally there are Originals available only in other countries; one notable example is Ulfuls' Japanese release, which was the top downloaded album in Japan for the first four days after iTunes first launched in that country in August 2005. Though they are definitely full-length releases (most are longer than the length of even an 80-minute Compact Disc), the fact that a majority of the tracks are either previously released recordings, re-recordings, or spoken word, results in the releases typically not being considered a "primary album release" for the artist.

By 2006, fifteen iTunes Originals albums had charted on the Billboard Top Digital Albums chart, including those by The Fray, Ben Harper, Rob Thomas and Fiona Apple. The best-selling digital-only album of 2005 was iTunes Originals – Sarah McLachlan.

The most recently released iTunes Originals was iTunes Originals – Weezer in 2010.

== List of iTunes Originals ==
Despite the cover images provided by iTunes, each iTunes Originals release is not simply titled iTunes Originals, but rather iTunes Originals – Artist in the files' album tag, and in iTunes' database.

#

- iTunes Originals – 3 Doors Down

A

- iTunes Originals – Aimee Mann
- iTunes Originals – Alanis Morissette
- iTunes Originals – Aleks Syntek
- iTunes Originals – Alexisonfire
- iTunes Originals – Amy Grant
- iTunes Originals – Ani DiFranco
- iTunes Originals – Anthony Hamilton

B

- iTunes Originals – Barenaked Ladies
- iTunes Originals – Ben Folds
- iTunes Originals – Ben Lee (Australian exclusive)
- iTunes Originals – Björk
- iTunes Originals – Bonnie Raitt

C

- iTunes Originals – Crazy Ken Band (Japanese exclusive)

D

- iTunes Originals – David Gray
- iTunes Originals – Death Cab for Cutie

E

- iTunes Originals – Elvis Costello
- iTunes Originals – Every Little Thing (Japanese exclusive)

F

- iTunes Originals – Finger Eleven
- iTunes Originals – Fiona Apple

G

- iTunes Originals – Globe (Japanese exclusive)
- iTunes Originals – Gloria Estefan & Miami Sound Machine (Released May 29, 2007, available both in English and Spanish)
- iTunes Originals – Goldfrapp
- iTunes Originals – Goo Goo Dolls

J

- iTunes Originals – Jack Johnson
- iTunes Originals – Jars of Clay
- iTunes Originals – Jewel
- iTunes Originals – Joel Plaskett

K

- iTunes Originals – Kato Tokiko (Japanese exclusive)
- iTunes Originals – Keith Urban

L

- iTunes Originals – Lee Ann Womack
- iTunes Originals – Liz Phair (available in both clean and explicit versions)
- iTunes Originals – LL Cool J

M

- iTunes Originals – Mary J. Blige
- iTunes Originals – Melissa Etheridge
- iTunes Originals – MercyMe
- iTunes Originals – Moby

N

- iTunes Originals – Nas (explicit)
- iTunes Originals – Neko Case
- iTunes Originals – New Order

P

- iTunes Originals – Patti Smith
- iTunes Originals – Paul Simon
- iTunes Originals – PJ Harvey

R

- iTunes Originals – Red Hot Chili Peppers
- iTunes Originals – R.E.M.
- iTunes Originals – Rob Thomas

S

- iTunes Originals – Sarah McLachlan
- iTunes Originals – Seether
- iTunes Originals – Sheryl Crow
- iTunes Originals – Something for Kate
- iTunes Originals – Staind
- iTunes Originals – Sting

T

- iTunes Originals – Tears for Fears
- iTunes Originals – The Black Crowes
- iTunes Originals – The Black Eyed Peas
- iTunes Originals – The Cardigans
- iTunes Originals – The Flaming Lips
- iTunes Originals – The Living End
- iTunes Originals – The Wallflowers

U

- iTunes Originals – Ua (Japanese exclusive)
- iTunes Originals – Ulfuls (Japanese exclusive)

W

- iTunes Originals – Weezer
- iTunes Originals – Willie Nelson

Y

- iTunes Originals – Yeah Yeah Yeahs
