= Building a Mystery =

1997 single by Sarah McLachlan

Single by Sarah McLachlan

from the album Surfacing
- B-side: "I Will Remember You"
- Released: 9 June 1997
- Length: 4:07
- Label: Nettwerk
- Songwriters: Sarah McLachlan; Pierre Marchand
- Producer: Pierre Marchand

Sarah McLachlan singles chronology
"I Will Remember You" (1995)	"Building a Mystery" (1997)	"Sweet Surrender" (1997)

Music video
- "Building a Mystery" on YouTube

"Building a Mystery" is a song by Canadian singer-songwriter Sarah McLachlan from her fourth studio album, Surfacing (1997). At a live performance, Sarah explains the song as being "basically about the fact that we all... have insecurities to hide, and we often do that by putting on a facade." She also goes on to say that "unfortunately, if we just be who we are, that's usually the more attractive and beautiful thing".

Released on 9 June 1997, the song was an immediate top-40 and adult contemporary hit, and it has received several accolades. Commercially, "Building a Mystery" was Canada's most successful single of 1997, topping the RPM 100 Hit Tracks chart for eight weeks, and peaked at number 13 in the United States. "Building a Mystery" won the Grammy Award for Best Female Pop Vocal Performance at the 40th Grammy Awards as well as the Juno Award for Single of the Year in 1998.

== Censorship ==
The album version of "Building a Mystery," and the live albums Afterglow Live and Mirrorball contain the line, "A beautiful fucked up man." The radio version replaces this line with "A beautiful but strange man" or the original lyric garbled beyond recognition, and during performances on radio or television, Sarah often sings the line "A beautiful messed up man."

== Reception ==
The song won the Juno Award for Single of the Year in 1998. The track also made Sarah McLachlan the recipient of the Grammy Award for Best Female Pop Vocal Performance at the Grammy Awards of 1998, beating Mariah Carey, Shawn Colvin, Paula Cole and Jewel. It came in at number 91 on VH1's "100 Greatest Songs of the '90s".

== Chart performance ==
"Building a Mystery" became McLachlan's biggest chart hit in Canada, spending eight weeks at number one on the RPM 100 Hit Tracks chart and ranking at number one on the magazine's year-end chart for 1997. It also topped the RPM Adult Contemporary Tracks and Alternative 30 charts. In the United States, it debuted at number 18 on the Billboard Hot 100 in early September 1997 and peaked at number 13 a month later. It also spent 10 weeks at number one on Adult Alternative Airplay; in February 2021, for the chart's 25th anniversary, Billboard ranked the song at number 38 on its list of the 100 most successful songs in the chart's history. In Australia, the song reached number 97 in March 1998.

== Music video ==
Directed by Matt Mahurin, the music video for the song features Moist front man David Usher. It features a man, described as McLachlan's boyfriend, taking points of light from wherever he travels and stitching some sort of garment. When McLachlan investigates in his absence, she finds that he has been assembling a skirt so decorated as to be lit with stars.

== In other uses ==
On 23 October 2001, "Building a Mystery" became the first song ever publicly played on an Apple iPod. Apple founder, chairman and CEO Steve Jobs selected and played a short portion of the song during the presentation in which he first introduced the iPod to the public at Apple Campus in Cupertino, California.

== Track listings ==
US CD and cassette single

1. "Building a Mystery" – 4:06
2. "I Will Remember You" – 4:53

US maxi-CD single and Australian CD single

1. "Building a Mystery" – 4:06
2. "I Will Remember You" – 4:53
3. "Possession" – 4:39
4. "Angel" (soft drum mix) – 4:30

== Personnel ==
Personnel are lifted from the Surfacing liner notes.

- Sarah McLachlan – writing, vocals, acoustic and electric guitars
- Pierre Marchand – writing, background vocals, production, recording, mixing
- Michel Pépin – additional electric guitars
- Brian Minato – bass
- Ash Sood – drums

== Charts ==
=== Weekly charts ===
Chart (1997–1998)	Peak position
Australia (ARIA)	97
Canada Top Singles (RPM)	1
Canada Adult Contemporary (RPM)	1
Canada Rock/Alternative (RPM)	1
Iceland (Íslenski Listinn Topp 40)	23
US Billboard Hot 100	13
US Adult Alternative Airplay (Billboard)	1
US Adult Contemporary (Billboard)	28
US Adult Pop Airplay (Billboard)	4
US Alternative Airplay (Billboard)	3
US Pop Airplay (Billboard)	15

=== Year-end charts ===
Chart (1997)	Position
Canada Top Singles (RPM)	1
Canada Adult Contemporary (RPM)	5
Canada Rock/Alternative (RPM)	15
US Billboard Hot 100	63
US Adult Top 40 (Billboard)	20
US Modern Rock Tracks (Billboard)	20
US Top 40/Mainstream (Billboard)	56
US Triple-A (Billboard)	5

Chart (1998)	Position
US Adult Top 40 (Billboard)	74

== Release history ==
Region	Date	Format(s)	Label(s)	Ref(s).
Canada	9 June 1997	Radio	Nettwerk	
United States	12 June 1997	Modern rock; triple A radio	Arista	
United States	23 June 1997	Hot adult contemporary radio	Arista	
United States	22 July 1997	Contemporary hit radio	Arista	

== See also ==
- List of RPM number-one singles of 1997 (Canada)
- List of RPM Rock/Alternative number-one singles (Canada)
