= The Freedom Sessions =

Remix album by Sarah McLachlan
- Released: 6 December 1994 (Canada); 28 March 1995 (US)
- Recorded: 1994
- Genre: Pop rock
- Length: 32:31
- Labels: Nettwerk (Canada); Arista (US)
- Producer: Pierre Marchand

Sarah McLachlan chronology
Fumbling Towards Ecstasy (1993)	The Freedom Sessions (1994)	Rarities, B-Sides and Other Stuff (1996)

The Freedom Sessions is an album by Sarah McLachlan which was released on 6 December 1994 on Nettwerk in Canada and on 28 March 1995 on Arista Records in the United States. The album contains previously unreleased alternative versions and remixes of seven songs that had appeared on McLachlan's 1993 album Fumbling Towards Ecstasy, as well as a cover version of "Ol' '55" by Tom Waits. Many of the tracks were recorded during the same sessions as Fumbling. In subsequent live performances, some of these songs (most notably "Ice Cream" and "Hold On") were reworked to match the style in which they were played on this album.

The album was released in two versions: a standard CD, and an enhanced CD containing CD-ROM bonus material including interviews and music videos. The album was one of the first major enhanced CD releases, and sold more than 200,000 units. As Toronto Star writer Peter Howell describes, The Freedom Sessions has "the distinction of being the first CD-ROM disc ever to chart on the influential Billboard Top 200 Albums chart".

Professional ratings
Review scores
Source	Rating
Allmusic	link
Rolling Stone	link

== Track listing ==
All songs by McLachlan, unless otherwise noted.

=== CD: Standard release ===
1. "Elsewhere" – 4:33
2. "Plenty" – 3:20
3. "Mary" – 3:55
4. "Good Enough" – 3:20
5. "Hold On" – 6:43
6. "Ice Cream" – 2:30
7. "Ice" – 3:58
8. "Ol' '55" (Tom Waits) – 4:12

=== CD: Nettwerk / W2-36321 (Canada) ===
1. Data Track
2. "Elsewhere" – 4:33
3. "Plenty" – 3:20
4. "Mary" – 3:55
5. "Good Enough" – 3:20
6. "Hold On" – 6:43
7. "Ice Cream" – 2:30
8. "Ice" – 3:58
9. "Ol' '55" (Tom Waits) – 9:33
- Enhanced v2.0 release
- "Ol' '55" is followed by a second version of "Hold On" 4:52 which starts at 4:41

== Personnel ==
- Sarah McLachlan - Vocals, Acoustic & Electric Guitars, Piano, Keyboards
- Luke Doucet - Slide Acoustic Guitar
- David Sinclair - Acoustic Guitar
- Pierre Marchand - Bass, Orchestra, Drum Programming, Percussion, Background Vocals
- Brian Minato - Bass
- David Kershaw - Bass, Piano, Hammond Organ
- Camille Henderson - Background Vocals
- Ashwin Sood - Drums, Djembe

== Charts ==
Chart (1994–95)	Peak position
Canada Top Albums/CDs (RPM)	36
US Billboard 200	78

== Certifications and sales ==
Region	Certification	Certified units/sales
Canada (Music Canada)	Platinum	100,000^{^}
United States (RIAA)	Gold	500,000^{^}
^{^} Shipments figures based on certification alone.
