= Manufacture (band) =

Manufacture was an electronic body music group from Boston, Massachusetts, who released two albums on Nettwerk between 1988 and 1991. They are best known for their 1988 debut single "As the End Draws Near", a collaboration with labelmate Sarah McLachlan.

The band was formed when Brian Bothwell, a video artist and student at Boston's School of the Museum of Fine Arts heard a song by electronic musician Perry Geyer on the radio and contacted Geyer to offer to make a video. They began performing around Boston with a show that consisted of instrumental electronic body music with experimental video projections.

After signing to Nettwerk, they met McLachlan soon after beginning to record their debut album in Vancouver, British Columbia; she was recording her debut album Touch for Nettwerk at the same time. After being invited to contribute vocals to a track they were working on, she returned the next day with the lyrics to "As the End Draws Near". The song was included in its original form on the band's 1988 debut album Terrorvision, and on a 12" single featuring an extended remix which was later included on McLachlan's 1996 compilation album Rarities, B-Sides and Other Stuff. The band's original proposal for the video would have featured McLachlan portraying the sole survivor of a nuclear apocalypse; however, Nettwerk did not have the budget to fly McLachlan to Boston for filming, and so a different video concept was pursued.

The band released its second album Voice of World Control in 1991, but subsequently broke up.

Bothwell went on to direct music videos for other artists. Geyer became a member of The Sky Dwellers, a trance group which also included Greg Hawkes of The Cars. He bought The Cars' Syncro Sound studios, and continued to operate it as CyberSound Studios.

Brian Bothwell died on January 10, 2025, at the age of 66.

== Discography ==
- Terrorvision (1988)
- Voice of World Control (1991)
