= The Best of Chillout: Past and Present =

Compilation album by various artists
- Released: April 20, 2004
- Genre: Chill-out
- Length: 72:53
- Label: Nettwerk

Professional ratings
Review scores
Source	Rating
AllMusic	3/5 stars
Exclaim!	Unfavorable

The Best of Chillout: Past and Present is a compilation album released by Nettwerk.

== Track listing ==
Adapted from AllMusic and the album's official liner notes.

No.	Title	Writer(s)	Performer	Length
1.	"The District Sleeps Alone Tonight" (DJ Downfall Persistent Beat Mix)	Ben Gibbard; Jimmy Tamborello	The Postal Service	6:49
2.	"Where Do I Begin"		The Chemical Brothers	5:08
3.	"Satellite"	BT	BT	4:56
4.	"Butterfly Caught" (Mad Professor Mazaruni Vocal Mix)	Elizabeth Fraser; Grantley Marshall; Mushroom; Robert "3D" del Naha	Massive Attack	6:03
5.	"Stupid" (Mark Bell Mix)	Sarah McLachlan	Sarah McLachlan	3:26
6.	"Here with Me" (Rollo's Chilln' with the Family Mix)	Dido Armstrong; Pascal Angel Gabriel; Paul Statham	Dido	5:07
7.	"Porcelain"	Moby	Moby	3:58
8.	"Center of the Sun" (Solarstone's Chilled-Out Remix)	Rhys Fulber	Conjure One	6:07
9.	"Elvis"	Corin Dingley; Andy Jenks; Kelvin Swaby	Alpha	3:19
10.	"Edge of the Ocean" (Duotone Mix)	Ivy	Ivy	4:08
11.	"Chocolate"	Milva	Lester	5:49
12.	"Finished Symphony"	Mike Truman	Hybrid	5:36
13.	"Silence" (Michael Woods Remix)	Rhys Fulber; Bill Leeb; McLachlan	Delerium	7:06
14.	"Signs" (Bonobo Mix)	Badmarsh & Shri	Badmarsh & Shri	5:20
Total length:				72:53
