= Colleen Wolstenholme =

Canadian artist

- Born: May 31, 1963 (age 62); Antigonish, Nova Scotia
- Education: Nova Scotia College of Art and Design; State University of New York at New Paltz; York University
- Awards: Sobey Art Award (national shortlist)
- Website: https://colleenwolstenholme.com/

Colleen Wolstenholme (born May 31, 1963) is a Canadian sculptor. She attended Nova Scotia College of Art and Design (NSCAD) from 1982 to 1986, and again in 1989, finished her Master of Fine Arts in 1992 at the State University of New York at New Paltz, and her PhD from York University in 2019. Her practice, while largely sculptural, also includes collage, drawing, jewellery, painting, photography, textiles, and video in a variety of literal and abstract approaches. Wolstenholme's earlier work makes analysis and commentary on the relationship between of women and medication, while her more recent works bring themes of neuroscience and human motion.

== Life and career ==
Wolstenholme was born in Antigonish, Nova Scotia, in 1963. She studied at Nova Scotia College of Art and Design (NSCAD) from 1982 to 1986 before moving to New York in 1987. There, she was exposed to a variety of works and artists, influencing her approach to art. In 1989, Wolstenholme returning to Halifax and NSCAD to complete a jewellery major, then continuing her jewellery in a Master of Fine Arts at the State University of New York at New Paltz in 1992. After graduation, Wolstenholme worked for Dia Art Foundation as an art installer for the next two years.

In 1996, she exhibited a handcrafted wooden wardrobe and fabric female genitals, as well as Patience (1996), a seven-foot-tall pentagonal padded cell. Both works comment on the treatment of women and mental health, locking women away through religion, mental institution, or medication, to subdue unwanted or undesired emotions, reactions, and attitudes. During this time, Wolstenholme also worked three semesters at NSCAD as an instructor before her first solo exhibition Patience (1996) in Anna Leonowens Gallery.

Wolstenholme's practice continues her exploration of women’s health and pharmaceuticals in jewellery-making, casting antianxiety, antidepressant, and psychostimulant pills into accurately-sized charms and accessories. In 1997, Wolstenholme moved to Vancouver for the next three years. There, she was invited by friend, Sarah McLachlan, to sell her jewellery-work at Lilith Fair rock festival. Here, Wolstenholme broke through into mainstream media and national critique as pharmaceutical companies threatened lawsuits over the use of their trademarked names. While no lawsuits ended up being filed, Wolstenholme continued her drug charms and her commentary on prescription drug dependency, substance abuse, and disproportionate effects on women under media pressure. In 1997, Wolstenholme also co-wrote a song for McLachlan’s multi-platinum album, Surfacing.

Wolstenholme to Nova Scotia in 1999, specifically to Hantsport, for the following years of her career. There, she created large-scale medication replications including Dexedrine, Paxil, Valium, Xanax, and Zoloft. Much like her drug jewellery, these sculptures critique the history of medication used against and for women as means of staving off hysteria and other undesirabed emotions, behaviours, and disorders.

In the early 2000s, Wolstenholme work addressed the relationship between clothing and the female body. Each made in 2005, Wolstenholme's sculptures Shrouded Figure, Triad, and Suffrage and her paintings Camoucash and Camouflesh series depict women in burqas and camouflage motifs. The use of both elements critique the Western distaste towards veils and shrouds while simultaneously fetishizing them, objects of both protection and oppression of women and gendered clothing. In 2002, Wolstenholme is nominated and shortlisted for the Sobey's Art Award. Later, Hyperobjects (2016) examines the unfathomable as Wolstenholme attempts to deconstruct and humanize understanding of the universe and society on a micro- and macro-scale.

In 2019, Wolstenholme earned her PhD from York University and, also hired in 2019 as an assistant professor at St. Thomas University in Fredericton, New Brunswick, for visual art.

From 2022 to 2024, Wolstenholme has shown a collection of oil paintings, ink drawings, light projection, and wire sculptures of sea-life: octopus, sea jellies, anemones, and other invertebrates. The series, In the Deep Blue Sea (2024), reflects her isolation during the COVID-19 pandemic, comparing it to the deep loneliness and peace of the deep ocean, meditative and floating through time and space.

Wolstenholme's work is now housed in Art Gallery of Nova Scotia, Confederation Centre for the Arts, Montreal Museum of Fine Arts, and the National Gallery of Canada, as well as in her own collection.

== Artwork ==
=== 2020s ===
- Solmissus Jelly, 2022. Radiolarian, 2024.
- Yellow Siphonophore, 2024.
- Barreleye Fish, 2024.
- Pelagic Polychaete, 2024.
- Blanket Squid, 2023.
- Benthic Ctenophore, 2023.
- Glass Squid, 2023.
- Bloody-Bell Comb Jelly, 2023.
- Holothurian, 2023.
- Diplulmaris Antarctica, 2023.
- Glass Octopus, 2023.
- Helmet Hellyfish, 2023.
- Yellow Ctenophore, 2023.
- Preparatory Drawings, 2023.
- Triptych, 2022.
- Triptych, 2022.
- Triptych, 2022.
- Triptych, 2022.
- Triptych, 2022.

=== 2010s ===
- Hexagraphy, 2018. 152.4 x 213.4 x 7.6 cm, paper, low temperature plastic, wires LED lights, fabric, microprocessor. Collection of the artist.
- Hexagraphy, grid, 2018.
- Index; Charcoal, 2018.
- Spatial Anomaly, 2018
- A Year of the Air I Breathe, 2018. Four-minute video.
- A Month of the Air I Breathe, 2018.
- A Day of the Air I Breathe, 2018.
- Wind Algorithm 2 (mean sea level pressure), 2018
- Wind Algorithm 5 (jet stream), 2017.
- Wind Algorithm 3 (jet stream), 2017.
- Wing Algorithm 4 (temperature), 2017.
- Wind Algorithm 1 (relative humidity), 2018.
- 38.84'S, 33.79'W; 295'@9km/h, 2015. 111.8 x 83.8 cm, ink on paper.
- Hexagonal Matrix, 2015. 230 x 180.3 cm, powdercoated welded steel.
- Triangular Matrix, 2015. 228.6 x 190.6 cm, powdercoated welded steel.
- Multiple Connected Triangles I & II, 2015. 106.7 x 96.5 cm, powdercoated welded steel.
- Topology 2, 2013. 132.1 x 106.7 cm, ink on nine sheets of paper.
- Topology, 2013. 223.5 x 228.6 cm, ink on six sheets of paper.
- 79.54' S x 89.01' E 140' @223km/h -46.0' C, 2015. 111.76 x 76.2 cm, ink on paper.
- 22.52’S, 179.60’W, 2015.
- Grid Cells, 2013. 111.76 x 76.2 cm, ink on paper.
- Cell, 2012. 60.96 x 48.26 cm, ink on paper.
- Netmap Red, 2012. 60.96 x 48.26 cm, ink on paper.
- Exposée, 2011. 132.1 x 182.9 x 76.2 cm, canvas, polypill, plaster, Perspex tubing, and wood. Collection of the artist.
- Undercover, 2011. Ceramic.
- Xanax 2MG and Dilaudid, 1997-2011.
- Neuraesthezia, 2011. Photo collage.

=== 2000s ===
- Sugar and Spice, 2007. 217.6 x 217.6 x 2.7 cm, twenty elements, bronze with patina and steel. Collection of National Gallery of Canada.
- Original; two ways, 2006.
- Curtain panel, 2006. 53.34 x 53.34 cm, wax.
- Eros and Thanatos, 2005. 53.34 x 53.34 cm, bronze.
- Hommesse, 2005. 304.8 x 304.8 cm, archival inkjet on paper with polyester bias tape. Collection of Confederation Centre Art Gallery.
- Camoucash, 2005. 60.96 x 60.96 cm, oil on board. Collection of Andrew Danyliw.
- Camouflesh USA, 2005. 61.0 x 61.2 cm, oil of board. Collection of Art Gallery of Nova Scotia.
- Camouflesh Finland, 2005. 61.2 x 61.2 cm, oil of board. Collection of Art Gallery of Nova Scotia.
- Camouflesh, Great Britain II, 2005. 61.0 x 61.2 cm, oil on board. Collection of Art Gallery of Nova Scotia.
- Camouflesh, Great Britain I, 2005. 6q.1 x 61.2 cm, oil on board. Collection of Art Gallery of Nova Scotia.
- Suffrage, 2005. 15.24 cm high, shelf 182.88 cm long, cast porcelain.
- Triad, 2005. Three figures, 132.1 x 86.4 x 58.4 cm each, hydrocal plaster, fibreglass mesh, and polished wax. Collection of National Gallery of Canada.
- Shrouded Figure, 2005. 134.0 x 66.0 x 55.0 cm, cast concrete. Collection of Art Gallery of Nova Scotia.
- …they often tend to resemble plants, 2004. 640.08 x 274.32 cm, inkjet on archival paper and mixed media.
- Halliburton, 2003. 20.32 x 25.4 cm, needlepoint.
- Dazzled, 2003. 31.0 x 23.0 x 23.0 cm, oil on plaster and hardboard.
- Grand Prix, 2003. 30.48 x 22.86 x 22.86 cm, oil on plaster and hardboard
- This and That, 2003. 31.0 x 23.0 x 23.0 cm, oil on plaster and hardboard. Private collection, Montreal.
- Spill, 2001, 2003. Twenty-four objects, 48.26 x 30.48 x 22.6 x 3.62 cm, carved plaster.
- Beargirl, 2003.
- Donkeygirl, 2003.
- Playboy Vallium Lapel Lin, 2003. 2.5 cm diameter, silver.
- Prozac (bracelet), 2002. 14K white gold.
- Daisy, 2002. 20.0 x 138.0 x 138.0 cm, cement. Collection of Art Gallery of Nova Scotia.
- Hang Senf Index, 2001. 30.48 x 30.48 cm, needpoint.
- BuSpar Column, 2001. 243.0 x 27.0 x 19.0 cm, bronze. Collection of Montreal Museum of Fine Arts.
- Diane, 2000. 22.86 x 17.78 cm, needlepoint.

=== 1990s ===
- Birthcontrol/Viagra Rosary, 1999. 101.6 cm, sterling silver. Collection of BJ Cunningham.
- Pantagram, 1999.
- Drug Company Logos, 1999. 10.16 x 17.78 cm, needlepoint. Collection of Cambridge galleries
- Pill Mandala, 1999. 83.82 x 83.82 cm, inkjet on paper.
- Mandala II, 1999.
- Daisies, 1999.
- Pills, 1998.
- Valium, 1997. 67.8 x 67.5 x 18.0 cm, carved plaster. Collection of Art Gallery of Nova Scotia.
- Paxil, 1997. 19.0 x 66.0 x 34.0 cm, carved plaster. Collection of Art Gallery of Nova Scotia.
- Dexedrine, 1997. 12.5 x 65.5 x 64.0 cm, carved plaster. Collection of Art Gallery of Nova Scotia.
- Xanax 2mg, 1997. 25.0 x 97.0 x 31.0 cm, carved plaster. Collection of Art Gallery of Nova Scotia.
- Xanax 2mg, 1997, 2010. 26.0 x 89.0 x 18.0 cm, bronze. Collection of Art Gallery of Nova Scotia.
- Charmed (bracelet), 1997. 18 cm diameter, sterling silver.
- Pill Jewellery, 1996 – present. Various dimensions and arrangements, silver and gold.
- Phenobarb Pillow, 1996.
- The Xanax Sampler, 1995. 22.5 x 35.5 cm, needlepoint. Collection of Confederation Centre Art Gallery.
- Prozac Pillow, 1995. 31.0 x 41.0 x 13.0 cm, copper, embroidery cotton. Private collection, New York.
- Patience (formally, Padded Cell), 1992-95. 263.0 x 118.5 x 128.5 cm, mixed media. Collection of Art Gallery of Nova Scotia.

== Exhibitions ==
=== Solo exhibitions ===
- 2024 "In the Deep Blue Sea", Art Mur, Montreal, Quebec, September 7 – October 26.
- 2018 "Apropos Obsolescence", Art Mur, Montreal, Quebec, September 8 – October 27.
- 2016 "Hyperobjects", Art Mur, Montreal, Quebec, January 16 – February 27.
- 2013 "Shifty Packets", Art Mur, Montreal, Quebec, September 11 – October 29.
- 2011 "Synaesthesiac", curated by Ivan Jurakic University of Waterloo Art Gallery, Waterloo Ontario, September 15 – October 29.
- 2011 "Represent!", Art Mur, Montreal, Quebec, September 3 – October 22.
- 2010 "Aniconia", Art Mur, Montreal, Quebec, January 12 – February 27.
- 2007/8 "A Divided Room", curated by Pan Wendt. Robert McLaughlin Gallery, Oshawa, Ontario, September 6 – November 2; Confederation Center for the Arts, Charlottetown, PEI, December 9 – March 21.
- 2007 "ICON", curated by Alexandra Keim. Art Gallery of Calgary, Calgary, Alberta, March 29 – June 20.
- 2006 "Iconophobia", curated by Ivan Jurakic. Cambridge Galleries, Cambridge, Ontario, January 21 - March 5.
- 2005 "Intercession", Encomium Contemporary Art, Toronto, Ontario, June 8 – July 11
- 2002 "AH", Saw Gallery, Ottawa, Ontario April, 13 - June 8.
- 1999 "Pharmacopoeia" Hamilton Artist's Inc., Hamilton, Ontario, April/May.
- 1998 "Pills" grunt gallery, Vancouver, British Columbia, May/June.
- 1996 "Patience" Anna Leonowens Gallery, NSCAD, Halifax, Nova Scotia, June/July.

=== Group exhibitions (small) ===
- 2020 "Spheres Skulls and Other Icons of the Interior" curated by Pan Wendt. Confederation Centre Art Gallery, Charlottetown, Prince Edward Island, March 7 – May 31.
- 2019 "Data Aesthetics", curated by Gentiane Belanger. Foreman Gallery, Bishop's University, Sherbrooke, Quebec, January–February
- 2004 "Greg Forrest, Colleen Wolstenholme, Jonathon Forrest", curated by Isa Spalding. Encomium Contemporary Art, Toronto, Ontario, December 4–February 4, 2005
- 2004 "Placebo: Helen Cho, Colleen Wolstenholme", curated by Lorna Brown. Artspeak, Vancouver, British Columbia, June 12 – July 16
- 2002/3 "Gill / Wolstenholme", curated by Ray Cronin. Art Gallery of Nova Scotia, Halifax, Nova Scotia, August 3, 2002 – October 31, 2003
- 2000 "Desire: Greg Forrest, Lauren Schaffer, Colleen Wolstenholme", curated by Ray Cronin. Confederation Center, Charlottetown, Prince Edward Island, April 9 – June 4 St. Mary's University Art Gallery, Halifax, Nova Scotia, October 10 – November 12

==== Group exhibitions (large) ====
- 2021 "Tyranny", Permanent collection, Art Gallery of Nova Scotia, Halifax, Nova Scotia, July 10 –
- 2021 "Terra Nova", curated by Rheal Olivier Lanthier and Francois St-Jacques Art Mur, Montreal, Quebec, February 9 – April 24
- 2013 Porcelain: Breaking Tradition curated by Rheal Olivier Lanthier. Art Mur, Montreal, Quebec, November 2 – December 21
- 2012 "Skin: the seduction of surface", curated by Sarah Fillmore. Art Gallery of Nova Scotia, Halifax, Nova Scotia, May 19 – October 1
- 2011 "Please Lie to Me", curated by Rheal Olivier Lanthier. Art Mur, Montreal, Quebec, November 5 – December 17
- 2011 "Synaptic Connections: Art and The Brain", curated by Dale Sheppard. Art gallery of Nova Scotia Halifax, Nova Scotia, September 23 – January 29, 2012
- 2011 "Pharmakon", curated by Marcel O'Gorman. Critical media Lab, Kitchener, Ontario, September 22-25
- 2011 "Momento Mori / Bone Again", Art Mur, Montreal, Quebec, March 12 – April 23
- 2010/11 "It Is What It Is", curated by Josee Drouin-Brisbois. National Gallery of Canada, Ottawa, Ontario, November 6 – April 10 2011
- 2008/9 "Arena: The Art of Hockey", curated by Ray Cronin. Art Gallery of Nova Scotia, Halifax, Nova Scotia, April 5 – June 8; Art Gallery of Alberta, Edmonton, Alberta, October 4, 2008 – January 9, 2009; Just for Laughs Museum, Montreal, Quebec, January 23 – April 19, 2009; Museum of Contemporary Canadian Art, Toronto, Ontario, September 9 – November 1, 2009.
- 2009 "Heartland", curated by Jeffrey Spalding. TIAF, Toronto ON October 22 – 27, 2009
- 2008 "When the Mood Strikes us", curated by J.J. Kegan McFadden. Platform Gallery, Winnipeg, Manitoba, September 12 – October 24
- 2007/8 "Pictured: Image and Object in Canadian Sculpture", curated by Ray Cronin.
- Art Gallery of Nova Scotia, Halifax, Nova Scotia, December 8 – March 24
- 2005 "Constitution", curated by Lynn Acoose. Godfrey Dean Art Gallery, Yorkton, Saskatchewan, June–August
- 2005 "The Watcher", curated by Isa Spalding Encomium Contemporary Art, Toronto, Ontario, February.
- 2005 "Appearances: New Work from Nova Scotia", Art Gallery of Nova Scotia, Halifax, Nova Scotia, January–February.
- 2004 "Marion McCain Atlantic Art Exhibition", The Beaverbrook Art Gallery, Fredericton, New Brunswick, March 14 – April 25.
- 2003 Container curated by Stephen Holmes Real Art Ways, Hartford, Connecticut, October 4 – January 3, 2004.
- 2002/3 "Sobey Art Award: 2002 shortlist exhibition", Art Gallery of Nova Scotia, Halifax, Nova Scotia, December 5, 2002 – February 2003; Museum of Contemporary Canadian Art, Toronto, Ontario, November 15–December 21, 2003.
- 2002 "Eleven Bulls: 15 Artists", Project Green, 106 Green Street, Brooklyn, New York, July 27 – August 11.
- 2002 "Surface Tourist", 15 Cecile Park, Crouch End, London, UK, June 21–25.
- 2001 "Art and Music Memorabilia", Horse Hospital Gallery, London, UK, November 19–24.
- 2000 "The Time Machine: Sculpture in the 20th Century", curated by Robin Peck. The University of Lethbridge Art Gallery, Lethbridge, Alberta, June 6 – September 20.

== Achievements and awards ==
- 2002 "Sobey Art Award", national shortlist

== Collections ==
Wolstenholme's work is held in various collections such as the Art Gallery of Nova Scotia, the Confederation Centre for the Arts, the Montreal Museum of Fine Arts, and the National Gallery of Canada, as well as her own collection.

== Publications ==
Cronin, Ray. Colleen Wolstenholme: Complications, Gaspereau Press, 2022

Clement, Eric. « Art Mur: 25 ans et toutes ses dents ! », La Presse, March 18, 2021

Cronin, Ray. "Representing Women: Colleen Wolstenholme's "Triad"," National Gallery of Canada Magazine, April 17, 2020

Cronin, Ray. "Damn Control: Colleen Wolstenholme's Sculpture of Resistance," Espace 120, Fall 2018

Cronin, Ray, Randolph, Jeanne, Wendt, Pan, "Sugar and Spice", Canada: Confederation Centre Art Gallery, Art Gallery of Nova Scotia, Robert McLaughlin Gallery, 2008

Cronin, Ray. "Sculpture and Other Provocations: The Artful Subversion of Colleen Wolstenholme", Border Crossings, issue 102, May 2007

Eichhorn, Virginia. "Colleen Wolstenholme, Iconophobia", Espace 77, Fall 2006

Millar, Joyce. Contemporary Canadian Sculpture, the Canadian Encyclopedia, Historica Foundation of Canada, 2006

Jurakic, Ivan. Iconophobia, exhibition catalogue essay, Cambridge Galleries, 2006

Peck, Robin. "Endless Columns", Espace 73, Fall 2005

Ward, Holly. Placebo/ Helen Cho, Colleen Wolstenholme, exhibition catalogue essay, Artspeak Gallery, 2004

Halicks, Richard. "Prescription for Trouble", Atlanta Journal Constitution, September 19, 2004

Genocchio, Benjamin. "It May be Minimal but it Challenges the Intellect", Art Review, The New York Times, 30 November, 2003

Cronin, Ray. "New Sculptural Realism: Rethinking Objectivity", Sculpture, Vol. 22, No. 9, Nov. 2003

Cronin, Ray. "Everything Changes" Gill/Wolstenholme, exhibition catalogue essay, Art Gallery of Nova Scotia, Fall 2002

Wendt, Pan. "Desire: Greg Forrest, Lauren Schaffer, Colleen Wolstenholme", exhibition review, Arts Atlantic, #67 Summer/Fall 2000

Peck, Robin. "The Time Machine: Sculpture in the 20th Century", the University of Lethbridge Art Gallery, Summer 2000

Cronin, Ray. Desire: Greg Forrest, Lauren Schaffer, Colleen Wolstenholme, exhibition catalogue essay, Confederation Center Art Gallery, Spring 2000

Johnson, Andrew. "One Pill is Larger, One is Small..." Lola, winter 1999–2000 Spitzer, Helen. "Medicating Resistance", Lola, winter 1999–2000

Hogshire, Jim. Pills-a-go-go, California: Feral House, 1999 Childerhose, Buffy. "Pills, Trick or Treat", Shift Magazine, summer 1999

Peck, Robin. "Scattered Across the Floor", C Magazine, #61 February-April 1999

Wilson, Carl. "Art Goes on The Pill", Globe and Mail, February 6, 1999

Auld, Alison. "Pharmaceutical Giant Mulls Legal Action..." Canadian Press, Aug. 18, 1998

Leigh, Wendy. "A Hard Pill to Swallow", London Sunday Times, Style, March 15, 1998

"Harper's Index", Harper's Magazine, January, 1998

"Mood Rings", People Magazine, November 10, 1997

Bibby, Patricia. "One Artist's Prescription for Jewellery", Associated Press, August 18, 1997
