= Afterglow (Sarah McLachlan album) =

Studio album by Sarah McLachlan
- Released: 4 November 2003
- Recorded: August 2002 – 2003
- Genre: Pop
- Length: 40:11
- Labels: Nettwerk (Canada); Arista (United States)
- Producer: Pierre Marchand

Sarah McLachlan chronology
Remixed (2001)	Afterglow (2003)	Afterglow Live (2004)

Singles from Afterglow
- 1. "Fallen" Released: 22 September 2003; 2. "Stupid" Released: 31 May 2004; 3. "World on Fire" Released: 14 June 2004

Afterglow is the fifth studio album by Canadian singer-songwriter Sarah McLachlan. Released on 4 November 2003, on Nettwerk in Canada and 4 November 2003, on Arista Records in the United States, it was her first album of new material in six years, and since the success of Surfacing and the Lilith Fair festival. Longtime collaborator Pierre Marchand produced the album. McLachlan wrote eight of the 10 songs herself and co-wrote the other two with Marchand.

The song "Answer" was featured in the 2007 movie The Brave One. It has also been used in television commercials for the ASPCA, with McLachlan appearing in person.

== Critical reception ==
Professional ratings
Aggregate scores
Source	Rating
Metacritic	55/100
Review scores
Source	Rating
AllMusic	3/5 stars
Blender	3/5 stars
E!	B−
Entertainment Weekly	B−
Mojo	1/5 stars
Now	2/5 stars
Q	3/5 stars
Rolling Stone	2/5 stars
Slant Magazine	2.5/5 stars
Stylus	3/10

Afterglow was met with "mixed or average" reviews from critics. At Metacritic, which assigns a weighted average rating out of 100 to reviews from mainstream publications, this release received an average score of 55 based on 11 reviews.

== Commercial performance and award nominations ==
Afterglow was released on 4 November 2003, and was a success in North America, reaching number two on the Billboard 200, topping the Canadian Albums Chart and selling 361,000 copies in its first week of release. It reached #33 in the UK (McLachlan's biggest success there thus far) and the top 50 in Australia in 2004. The first single, "Fallen", reached the top ten on the Adult Top 40 Billboard charts and a remix reached top ten in the United States dance charts. A second single, "Stupid" was released in March 2004.

McLachlan was nominated in five Juno Award categories in Canada, including Album of the Year and Pop Album of the Year for Afterglow, and Songwriter of the Year for the songs on the album. The awards were announced on 4 April 2004. The album was also nominated for a Grammy Award in the Best Pop Vocal Album field in 2005.

Afterglow has sold over 2.3 million copies in the US (as of November 2004) and went two times platinum. Worldwide, the album has sold more than four million copies (as of October 2006).

== Track listing ==
Afterglow
No.	Title	Writer(s)	Length
1.	"Fallen"	Sarah McLachlan	3:47
2.	"World on Fire"	McLachlan; Pierre Marchand	4:22
3.	"Stupid"	McLachlan	3:24
4.	"Drifting"	McLachlan	3:23
5.	"Train Wreck"	McLachlan	4:36
6.	"Push"	McLachlan	3:56
7.	"Answer"	McLachlan	3:58
8.	"Time"	McLachlan	4:07
9.	"Perfect Girl"	McLachlan; Marchand	4:43
10.	"Dirty Little Secret"	McLachlan	3:55
Total length:			40:11

== Personnel ==
- Sarah McLachlan – vocals, electric guitar, piano, Rhodes piano, keyboards
- Sean Ashby – guitar
- Michel Pepin – guitar
- Pete Caigan – engineering
- Michael Chaves – guitar
- Jim Creeggan – acoustic bass
- Yanick Daunais – engineering
- Bill Dillon – guitar, guitorgan, church organ
- Yves Desrosiers – guitar
- Kharen Hill – photography
- Brian Hogue – engineering
- Ethan Johns – guitar
- Jorane – cello, background vocals, vocal treatments
- Mark Jowett – guitar
- David Kershaw – Hammond organ
- Daryl Johnson – bass guitar
- Tony Levin – bass guitar
- Roman Klun – engineering
- Bob Ludwig – mastering
- Pierre Marchand – guitar, bass guitar, piano, keyboards, synthesizer bass, production, engineering, mixing
- Jerry Marotta – percussion
- John Oliviera – engineering
- Chis Potter – engineering, mixing
- Ashwin Sood – drums, percussion, loops, keyboard bass
- Linda Strawberry – engineering

== Charts ==
=== Weekly charts ===
Chart (2003–04)	Peak position
Australian Albums (ARIA)	22
Austrian Albums (Ö3 Austria)	72
Belgian Albums (Ultratop Flanders)	18
Belgian Albums (Ultratop Wallonia)	23
Canadian Albums (Billboard)	1
Danish Albums (Hitlisten)	33
Dutch Albums (Album Top 100)	23
European Albums (Top 100)	28
French Albums (SNEP)	65
German Albums (Offizielle Top 100)	25
Irish Albums (IRMA)	20
Italian Albums (FIMI)	66
New Zealand Albums (RMNZ)	30
Norwegian Albums (VG-lista)	14
Polish Albums (ZPAV)	37
Scottish Albums (Official Charts)	26
Singaporean Albums (RIAS)	9
Swedish Albums (Sverigetopplistan)	20
Swiss Albums (Schweizer Hitparade)	19
UK Albums (Official Charts)	33
US Billboard 200	2

=== Year-end charts ===
Chart (2003)	Position
US Billboard 200	124
Chart (2004)	Position
Australian Albums (ARIA)	83
US Billboard 200	34

== Certifications and sales ==
Region	Certification	Certified units/sales
Australia (ARIA)	Gold	35,000^{^}
Canada (Music Canada)	5× Platinum	500,000^{^}
New Zealand (RMNZ)	Gold	7,500^{^}
United Kingdom (BPI)	Gold	100,000^{^}
United States (RIAA)	2× Platinum	2,300,000
Summaries
Worldwide	—	4,000,000
^{^} Shipments figures based on certification alone.
