= Adia =

1998 single by Sarah McLachlan

Single by Sarah McLachlan

from the album Surfacing
- Released: 2 March 1998
- Length: 4:05 (album version); 4:02 (remix/single version)
- Label: Nettwerk; Arista
- Songwriters: Sarah McLachlan; Pierre Marchand
- Producer: Pierre Marchand

Sarah McLachlan singles chronology
| "Sweet Surrender" (1997) | "Adia" (1998) | "Angel" (1998) |

Music video
- "Adia" on YouTube

"Adia" is a song by Canadian singer Sarah McLachlan from her fourth studio album, Surfacing (1997). It was co-written by McLachlan and her longtime producer, Pierre Marchand. McLachlan has said about the song, "...more than anything, it's about my problems in dealing with feeling responsible for everyone else". "Adia" was released as the third North American single from Surfacing on 2 March 1998; in Europe, it served as McLachlan's debut single, receiving a UK release in September 1998.

"Adia" was McLachlan's first top-five song on the US Billboard Hot 100, peaking at number three, totalling 14 weeks in the top five, and ending 1998 as the country's 20th-most-successful song. The song also performed well in McLachlan's native Canada, peaking at number three for three non-consecutive weeks on the RPM 100 Hit Tracks chart. The song's music video shows McLachlan singing directly to the camera in various public places, including a busy intersection, an office lobby, a supermarket aisle, and in front of a store that sells wedding dresses.

== Background ==
In concert on 13 March 2018, Sarah McLachlan spoke about the background of her song Adia. Explaining that she "crossed a line" by falling in love with "the ex of my best friend". Her friendship (with the Adia from the song's title) suffered a breakdown. The man she fell in love with was at the time "my drummer" she said, with whom she went on to have two children. The song, McLachlan explained, is about "the aftermath" of losing her best friend and her feelings of guilt.

== Composition ==
The song starts with no musical introduction, save two piano notes. The lyrics begin "Adia, I do believe I've failed you. Adia, I know I've let you down." The chorus says that "We are born innocent. Believe me Adia, we are still innocent." At times the music is simple and soft, with little more than a piano accompanying McLachlan.

== Release and reception ==
"Adia" was the third of four songs from Surfacing to be released as a single. It was her most successful US single, peaking at number three on the Billboard Hot 100. The single contains four tracks: the radio mix of "Adia", the Surfacing mix of "Angel", the original studio version of "I Will Remember You" (as opposed to the live version included on the Mirrorball album, also released as a single), and a live version of "Building a Mystery".

McLachlan was nominated for Best Female Pop Vocal Performance at the Grammy Awards of 1999 for "Adia", losing to Celine Dion's "My Heart Will Go On". A live version of "Adia" appears on Mirrorball.

== Track listings ==
Canadian CD single

1. "Adia" – 4:02
2. "Angel" – 4:30
3. "I Will Remember You" – 4:52
4. "Building a Mystery" – 4:50

US CD and cassette single

1. "Adia" – 4:02
2. "Angel" – 4:30
3. "I Will Remember You" – 4:52

UK CD single

1. "Adia" – 4:02
2. "Angel" – 4:30
3. "Possession" – 4:39

UK cassette single

1. "Adia" – 4:02
2. "Angel" – 4:30

European CD single

1. "Adia" (album version) – 4:03
2. "Adia" (remix) – 4:04

Australian CD single

1. "Adia" (album version) – 4:03
2. "Adia" (remix) – 4:01
3. "Angel" – 4:30
4. "I Will Remember You" – 4:52

== Personnel ==
Personnel are lifted from the Surfacing liner notes.

- Sarah McLachlan – writing, vocals, acoustic guitars, piano
- Pierre Marchand – writing, bass, keyboards
- Ash Sood – background vocals, drums, percussion
- Brian Minato – bass

== Charts ==
=== Weekly charts ===
| Chart (1998–1999) | Peak position |
|---|---|
| Australia (ARIA) Double A-side with "Angel" | 55 |
| Canada Top Singles (RPM) | 3 |
| Canada Adult Contemporary (RPM) | 1 |
| Canada (Nielsen SoundScan) | 7 |
| Europe (Eurochart Hot 100) | 77 |
| Germany (GfK) | 96 |
| Netherlands (Dutch Top 40 Tipparade) | 20 |
| Netherlands (Single Top 100) | 85 |
| Scottish Singles Sales (Official Charts) | 33 |
| UK Singles (Official Charts) | 18 |
| US Billboard Hot 100 | 3 |
| US Adult Alternative Airplay (Billboard) | 7 |
| US Adult Contemporary (Billboard) | 5 |
| US Adult Pop Airplay (Billboard) | 6 |
| US Pop Airplay (Billboard) | 20 |

=== Year-end charts ===
| Chart (1998) | Position |
|---|---|
| Canada Top Singles (RPM) | 10 |
| Canada Adult Contemporary (RPM) | 2 |
| US Billboard Hot 100 | 20 |
| US Adult Contemporary (Billboard) | 14 |
| US Adult Top 40 (Billboard) | 16 |
| US Mainstream Top 40 (Billboard) | 46 |
| US Triple-A (Billboard) | 41 |

== Certifications and sales ==
| Region | Certification | Certified units/sales |
|---|---|---|
| United States (RIAA) | Gold | 1,000,000 |

== Release history ==
| Region | Date | Format(s) | Label(s) | Ref. |
|---|---|---|---|---|
| United States | 2 March 1998 | Contemporary hit radio | Arista | |
| United States | 8 May 1998 | CD; cassette | Arista | |
| Canada | 7 July 1998 | CD | Nettwerk | |
| United Kingdom | 21 September 1998 | CD; cassette | Arista; BMG; Nettwerk | |

== Cover versions ==
In 1999, saxophonist Richard Elliot covered the song from the release Chill Factor.
