= Sarah McLachlan Live =

Live

Live album by Sarah McLachlan
- Released: 1992
- Recorded: 1992
- Genre: Singer-songwriter
- Length: 32:31
- Label: Nettwerk
- Producer: Sarah McLachlan

Sarah McLachlan chronology
Solace (1991)	Live (1992)	Fumbling Towards Ecstasy (1993)

Professional ratings
Review scores
Source	Rating
Allmusic	2.5/5 stars

Live is a 1992 live recording by Sarah McLachlan, not to be confused with the 2004 Live Acoustic EP. It documents a concert that McLachlan performed in September of that year in Harbourfront, Toronto, and was released on CD in October. All of the songs originally appeared on McLachlan's 1991 album Solace, except "Ben's Song", which is from her 1988 release Touch. Although labelled an EP, a format that usually has a short running time and only a few tracks, this release runs more than 30 minutes, above the length threshold of being a full album.

This album was released as a limited edition, which included a condensed version of McLachlan's 1991–1992 tour program; all copies released by the label have sold out. It is now considered a collector's item. It is the first of several live albums McLachlan has released to date.

"Drawn to the Rhythm" was later included on the 1996 compilation Rarities, B-Sides and Other Stuff.

== Track listing ==
No.	Title	Writer(s)	Length
1.	"Drawn to the Rhythm"	Sarah McLachlan	5:15
2.	"Back Door Man"	McLachlan	4:50
3.	"Home"	McLachlan	5:45
4.	"Lost"	McLachlan	6:23
5.	"I Will Not Forget You"	McLachlan, Darren Phillips	5:55
6.	"Black"	McLachlan	5:05
7.	"Ben's Song"	McLachlan	4:59

== Musicians ==
- Sarah McLachlan: Vocals, acoustic guitar, piano
- Stephen Nikleva: Electric Guitar
- Brian Minato: Bass
- David Kershaw: Keyboards, Background Vocals
- Kim Linekin: Keyboards, background vocals
- Ashwin Sood: Drums, percussion, background vocals
