= Alex Luke =

Music executive

- Born: South Carolina
- Education: Texas A&M
- Occupation: Music executive
- Website: www.linkedin.com/in/alexluke/

Alex Luke is a music executive and former disc jockey known for his contributions to the digital music business in the early 2000s. He has held executive positions with Apple and Amazon.

== Early life and education ==
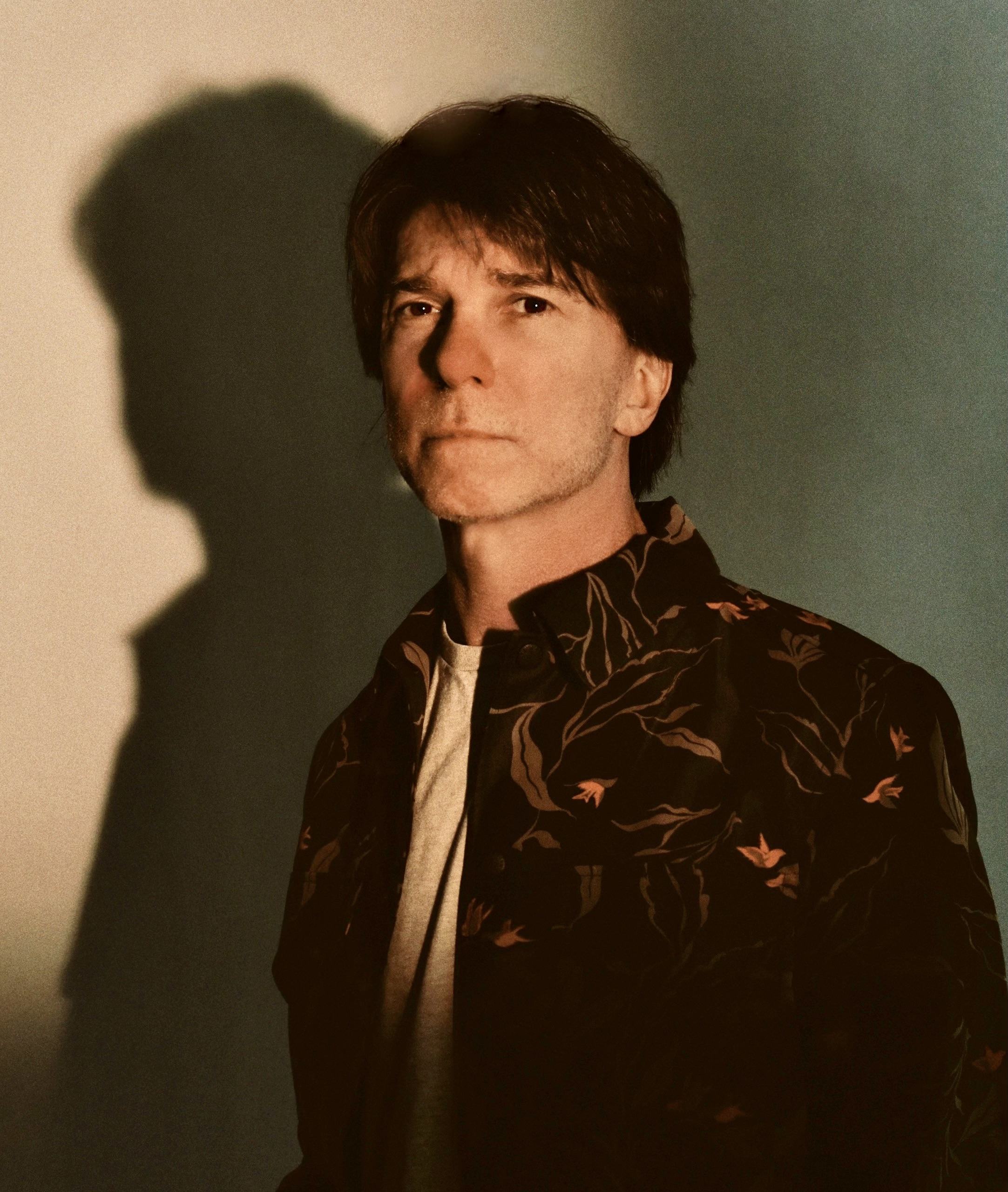
Alex Luke in 2023. Photo by Shervin Lainez.

Luke was born in South Carolina but later moved to Dallas, Texas where he graduated from Berkner High School. He attended Texas A&M and while in school became an intern for George Gimarc on the radio show The Rock and Roll Alternative.

== Career ==
Luke worked as an assistant at KNON-FM beginning in 1986 and in 1989 became a full-time DJ for KDGE 94.5 FM in Dallas, Texas. During his time at KDGE, he launched and was the original host of Edgeclub 94 and The Adventure Club, a radio show that played newly released music and was credited for bringing exposure to local bands such as Toadies, Course of Empire, and Funland. He left KDGE in 1994 to become a morning drive DJ and the Assistant Program Director at KPNT in St. Louis, Missouri. During his time at the station, he produced the Pointfest concert series and introduced the Pointessential CD series. Luke left KPNT in 1997 to become the program director at Q101 in Chicago.

Luke went on to work as the VP of Music Programming at PressPlay in 2001, an online music service launched by Universal Music Group and Sony Music that would later become Napster. In 2003 he began working for Apple where he was in charge of music programming and label relations globally for iTunes and where he is credited with launching programs such as the iTunes Single of the Week, iTunes Essentials, and iTunes Originals. He left Apple in 2011 to become Executive Vice President of A&R for EMI.

Luke became a venture capitalist and worked at The Valley Fund until leaving in 2017. He then joined Amazon as the Global Head of Programming and Content Strategy for Amazon Music. He subsequently became the Senior VP of Digital Content for both SiriusXM and Pandora.
