= Hold On (Sarah McLachlan song) =

Single by Sarah McLachlan

from the album Fumbling Towards Ecstasy
- Released: February 1994
- Recorded: 1993
- Genre: Pop
- Length: 4:06
- Label: Nettwerk
- Songwriter: Sarah McLachlan
- Producer: Pierre Marchand

Sarah McLachlan singles chronology
"Possession" (1993)	"Hold On" (1994)	"Good Enough" (1994)

Music video
- "Hold On" on YouTube

"Hold On" is a song written and recorded by Canadian singer Sarah McLachlan. It was released in February 1994 as the second single from her album, Fumbling Towards Ecstasy (1993). In 2008, "Hold On" was included on McLachlan's greatest hits compilation, Closer: The Best of Sarah McLachlan.

== Background ==
McLachlan was inspired to write "Hold On" after watching a 1992 Canadian documentary titled A Promise Kept. The documentary told the story of a married couple, Blair and Karin Donnan, and how Karin cared for and supported her husband after his diagnosis with AIDS in 1987 through to his death in 1989. She made him a promise to raise awareness of the disease and the stigma against it by telling their story publicly. In addition to the documentary, Donnan spent a few years touring all over Ontario to hold talks at schools. She was diagnosed with HIV in 1994 and developed AIDS in 1996, forcing her to give up her talks. McLachlan was inspired by the couple's "great and tragic love story" and, in particular, Karin's "passion, empathy and strength". During her appearance on VH1 Storytellers in 1998, McLachlan said:

"This [was] one of those rare occasions when a song came out very quickly and easily. It was from pure emotion. I was watching a documentary called A Promise Kept about this woman who discovered her fiancé was HIV positive. Basically, the story followed her and her husband. They got married. He got progressively sicker and she took care of him right up until the end. She was telling the story with such beautiful clarity and honesty. It struck home in a way that I couldn't really describe except by writing this song. And I really feel like it's something that came out of me through her."

== Track listing ==
- Canadian CD single
1. "Hold On" – 4:06
2. "Hold On II" – 3:39
3. "Mary" (Early Demo) – 3:57
- US promotional single
1. "Hold On" (New Version) – 3:56
2. "Hold On" (Live Version) – 4:10
- Other versions
1. "Hold On" – 4:21, taken from No Alternative (1993)
2. "Hold On" (Freedom Sessions) – 6:43, taken from The Freedom Sessions (1994)
3. "Hold On" (Live) – 5:18, taken from Mirrorball (1999)
4. "Hold On" (BT Mix) – 7:44, taken from Remixed (2001)
5. "Hold On" (Live) – 5:53, taken from Afterglow Live (2004)

== Commercial performance ==
"Hold On" debuted on the RPM Canadian Singles Chart in February 1994 and peaked at number 59 in April 1994. It also entered the US Alternative Songs Chart in January 1995 and reached number 29 the next month.

== Charts ==
Chart (1994–95)	Peak position
Canada Top Singles (RPM)	59
US Alternative Airplay (Billboard)	29
