= Rarities, B-Sides and Other Stuff =

Rarities, B-Sides & Other Stuff

Compilation album by Sarah McLachlan
- Released: 25 June 1996
- Recorded: 1988–1995
- Genre: Pop
- Length: 56:00
- Label: Nettwerk
- Producers: Pierre Marchand, Greg Reely, Sarah McLachlan, Gary Stokes

Sarah McLachlan chronology
The Freedom Sessions (1994)	Rarities, B-Sides & Other Stuff (1996)	Surfacing (1997)

Professional ratings
Review scores
Source	Rating
Allmusic	3/5 stars

Rarities, B-Sides & Other Stuff is an album by Sarah McLachlan released in Canada on 25 June 1996.

It is a compilation of tracks that McLachlan recorded for film soundtracks, remixes of her own songs, covers of songs by other artists, live recordings, and material that she recorded in collaboration with various artists.

Guest musicians appearing on the album include Deni Bonet, Jocelyne Lanois, Bill Dillon, Luke Doucet, Manufacture and Camille Henderson; remixers include Anthony Valcic, Gary Stokes and Rabbit in the Moon.

The song "Full of Grace" later reappeared as the ninth track on McLachlan's next album, Surfacing. The extended remix of "Vox" first appeared on the 1989 release of her debut album, Touch. The live version of "Drawn to the Rhythm" first appeared on McLachlan's 1992 album Sarah McLachlan Live.

== Track listing ==
No.	Title	Writer(s)	Length
1.	"Dear God"	Andy Partridge	3:53
2.	"I Will Remember You"	McLachlan, Séamus Egan, Dave Merenda	4:53
3.	"Fear (LunaSol Remix)"	McLachlan	6:39
4.	"Gloomy Sunday (Live)"	Desmond Carter, Sam M. Lewis, Rezső Seress	4:45
5.	"Full of Grace"	McLachlan	3:38
6.	"Song for a Winter's Night"	Gordon Lightfoot	3:46
7.	"Blue"	Joni Mitchell	2:47
8.	"Drawn to the Rhythm" (Live)	McLachlan	5:14
9.	"Shelter" (Violin mix)	McLachlan	3:28
10.	"As the End Draws Near (Extended Remix)" (feat. Manufacture)	McLachlan, Brian Bothwell, Perry Geyer	4:44
11.	"Vox" (Extended remix)	McLachlan	6:49
12.	"Into the Fire" (Extended remix)	McLachlan, Pierre Marchand	5:34
13.	"Possession" (Rabbit in the Moon remix)	McLachlan	5:51

== Charts ==
=== Weekly charts ===
Chart (1996)	Peak position
Canada Top Albums/CDs (RPM)	10
Canadian Albums (The Record)	6
Chart (2008)	Peak position
Australian Albums (ARIA)	147

=== Year-end charts ===
Chart (1996)	Position
Canada Top Albums/CDs (RPM)	54

== Certifications and sales ==
Region	Certification	Certified units/sales
Canada (Music Canada)	3× Platinum	300,000^{^}
^{^} Shipments figures based on certification alone.

== See also ==
- Rarities, B-Sides and Other Stuff Volume 2
