= Fallen (Sarah McLachlan song) =

2003 single by Sarah McLachlan

- US artwork

Single by Sarah McLachlan

from the album Afterglow
- B-side: "Answer" (acoustic)
- Released: September 22, 2003
- Length: 3:47
- Label: Arista; Nettwerk
- Songwriter: Sarah McLachlan
- Producer: Pierre Marchand

Sarah McLachlan singles chronology
"Angel" (1998)	"Fallen" (2003)	"Stupid" (2004)

European and Australian artwork

Music video
- "Fallen" on YouTube

"Fallen" is the first single from Canadian singer-songwriter Sarah McLachlan's fifth studio album, Afterglow (2003). The song was a moderate commercial success, reaching number 32 in Ireland, number 41 in Australia and the United States, and number 50 in the United Kingdom. At the 2004 Grammy Awards, it was nominated for Best Female Pop Vocal Performance, losing to "Beautiful" by Christina Aguilera.

== Track listings ==
US CD single

1. "Fallen" (radio mix) – 3:48
2. "Fallen" (album mix) – 3:51
3. "Answer" (acoustic live) – 3:43

Australian CD single

1. "Fallen" (radio mix) – 3:48
2. "Answer" – 3:43
3. "Hold On" – 6:43
4. "Fallen" (video) – 3:48

UK and European CD single

1. "Fallen" (album mix) – 3:48
2. "Dirty Little Secret" (live) – 3:42

European maxi-CD single

1. "Fallen" (radio mix) – 3:48
2. "Angel" – 4:30
3. "Adia" – 4:05
4. "Fallen" (video) – 3:48

European 12-inch single

1. "Fallen" (Gabriel & Dresden Anti Gravity mix) – 10:31
2. "Fallen" (Satoshi Tomiie Interpretation) – 10:03

== Charts ==
=== Weekly charts ===
Chart (2003–2004)	Peak position
Australia (ARIA)	41
Belgium (Ultratip Bubbling Under Flanders)	14
Belgium (Ultratip Bubbling Under Wallonia)	4
Canada AC Top 30 (Radio & Records)	18
Ireland (IRMA)	32
Netherlands (Dutch Top 40 Tipparade)	15
Netherlands (Single Top 100)	89
Scottish Singles Sales (Official Charts)	42
UK Singles (Official Charts)	50
US Billboard Hot 100	41
US Adult Alternative Airplay (Billboard)	3
US Adult Contemporary (Billboard)	12
US Adult Pop Airplay (Billboard)	5
US Dance Club Songs (Billboard)	3

=== Year-end charts ===
Chart (2003)	Position
US Adult Top 40 (Billboard)	40
US Triple-A (Billboard)	41

Chart (2004)	Position
US Adult Contemporary (Billboard)	27
US Adult Top 40 (Billboard)	13
US Triple-A (Billboard)	10

== Release history ==
Region	Date	Format(s)	Label(s)	Ref.
United States	September 22, 2003	Adult contemporary; hot AC; triple A radio	Arista; Nettwerk	
United States	October 20, 2003	Contemporary hit radio	Arista; Nettwerk	
Australia	November 17, 2003	CD	Arista; Nettwerk	
United Kingdom	March 8, 2004	CD	Arista; BMG; Nettwerk	
