= Good Enough (Sarah McLachlan song) =

Single by Sarah McLachlan

from the album Fumbling Towards Ecstasy
- B-side: "Blue"
- Released: 12 September 1994
- Recorded: 1993
- Genre: Pop
- Length: 5:03
- Songwriter: Sarah McLachlan
- Producer: Pierre Marchand

Sarah McLachlan singles chronology
"Hold On" (1994)	"Good Enough" (1994)	"I Will Remember You" (1995)

"Good Enough" is a song by Canadian singer-songwriter Sarah McLachlan. It was released on 12 September 1994 as the third and final single from her third studio album Fumbling Towards Ecstasy (1993).

The song was McLachlan's first top 10 hit in Canada, peaking at number 9. It was also her second song to chart in the US, where it reached number 77. The single's B-side is a cover of "Blue" by Joni Mitchell, which was also included as a bonus track on some pressings of Fumbling Towards Ecstasy.

The song's lyrics concern abuse and violence towards women and girls, and that theme is also reflected in the song's music video which was directed by Kharen Hill.
