= Sean Ashby =

Canadian guitarist

- Origin: Canada
- Genres: Rock
- Occupations: Singer-songwriter, musician, guitarist
- Instruments: Guitar, vocals
- Years active: 1996–present

Sean Ashby is a singer, songwriter and guitarist who has performed with Sarah McLachlan since 1996. He also played and recorded with Delerium, Ginger (formerly Grapes of Wrath), Wild Strawberries, Mae Moore, DMC of Run-D.M.C. and many others. Ashby formed the group Jack Tripper in 1999.

He recorded two albums, Jack Tripper and 9 Easy Pieces and released a solo album "Brass and Gold" in 2008.

== Discography ==
- 2008 Brass and Gold

== See also ==
- Music of Canada
- Canadian rock
- List of Canadian musicians
