= Ashwin Sood =

- Born: 25 September 1967 (age 59); Birmingham, England
- Instruments: Drums, percussion

Ashwin Sood (born 25 September 1967) is an English–born Canadian musician and drummer. He is best known for his musical association with his ex-wife Sarah McLachlan.

Sood was born in the United Kingdom to Indian immigrant parents, and grew up in Calgary, Alberta, Canada. He began playing drums at the age of seven.

In 1990, he graduated from California's Musicians Institute (Percussion Institute of Technology). He met McLachlan in the early 1990s while he was on tour with Lava Hay. She asked him to play drums on "I Will Not Forget You" on her second album, Solace. As well as Lava Hay, he has also played drums and produced songs for Bass is Base and Mae Moore.

On 7 February 1997, Sood and McLachlan were married in Negril, Jamaica. Their first daughter, India Ann Sushil Sood, was born on 6 April 2002; their second daughter Taja was born on 22 June 2007. The family lived in West Vancouver, British Columbia, Canada. In September 2008, the couple separated and later divorced.

Sood is the cousin of actor siblings Veena Sood and Manoj Sood.

== Works ==
- Mind That Parcel (1985)
- Find A Penny (1984)

== Work with Sarah McLachlan ==
- Solace (1991)
- Live EP (1992)
- Fumbling Towards Ecstasy (1993)
- The Freedom Sessions (1994)
- Rarities, B-Sides and Other Stuff (1996)
- Surfacing (1997)
- Mirrorball (1999)
- Afterglow (2003)
- Afterglow Live (2004)
- Wintersong (2006)

== Additional performances ==
- Stevie Nicks (Trouble in Shangri-La)
- Rufus Wainwright (Poses)
- Mediæval Bæbes (Undrentide)
- Delerium (Poem) (Chimera) - Nuages Du Monde Tour 2008
- Fauxliage (Delerium with Leigh Nash on vocals)
- Conjure One (Conjure One)
- Tara MacLean (Silence)
- Stephen Fearing (The Assassin's Apprentice)
- Wild Strawberries (Quiver & Heroine)
- Mae Moore (Bohemia)
- Greg Keelor (Gone)
- Island of Circles (a Donovan tribute album, track "Barabajagal", as Chocolate Factory)
