= Surfacing (album) =

Studio album by Sarah McLachlan
- Released: 15 July 1997
- Recorded: July 1996–1997
- Studio: Wild Sky Studios
- Genres: Pop; soft rock
- Length: 41:14
- Labels: Nettwerk (Canada); Arista (US)
- Producer: Pierre Marchand

Sarah McLachlan chronology
Rarities, B-Sides and Other Stuff (1996)	Surfacing (1997)	Mirrorball (1999)

Singles from Surfacing
- 1. "Building a Mystery" Released: 9 June 1997; 2. "Sweet Surrender" Released: 1997; 3. "Adia" Released: 2 March 1998; 4. "Angel" Released: 28 September 1998

Surfacing is the fourth studio album by Canadian singer-songwriter Sarah McLachlan, released on 15 July 1997. It was produced by McLachlan's frequent collaborator, Pierre Marchand, and its release coincided with the start of McLachlan's Lilith Fair tour. The album reached the top position on the Canadian RPM 100 Albums chart, number two on the US Billboard 200 and became her first album to reach the top 50 outside of North America, achieving that in the UK, Australia and the Netherlands. It was certified as Diamond in sales in Canada and as 8× Platinum in sales in the US. Critical reviews were mixed; some of the more positive reviews praised the songwriting, while the album's detractors criticized it as banal and slow.

The album spawned three top-three hits on the Canadian Singles Chart, including "Building a Mystery", which spent eight weeks at number one, "Sweet Surrender", which reached number two, and "Adia" which ascended to number three. The fourth single "Angel" peaked at number nine, but did reach number three on the Canadian Adult Contemporary Chart, something the other three singles also achieved. Two of the songs, "Adia" and "Angel" were US Billboard Hot 100 top-five hits (the latter also peaking at number one on the Billboard Adult Contemporary Chart) while "Building a Mystery" was a top-15 hit and "Sweet Surrender" was a top-30 hit. "Adia" and "Angel" became her first songs to reach the top 40 in some countries outside of North America.

The album won four Juno Awards including for Album of the Year. "Building a Mystery" was awarded the Grammy Award for Best Female Pop Vocal Performance, while the instrumental-only song "Last Dance" won the Grammy Award for Best Pop Instrumental Performance.

== Background ==
Following the 1993 release of her third album and U.S. breakthrough, Fumbling Towards Ecstasy, McLachlan spent two and a half years touring. This long period on the road finished in January 1996; over this time, the album slowly became a hit record. Work on the follow-up was scheduled to begin in April of that year, but McLachlan found herself mentally exhausted at the time, later claiming that she had personally wanted Fumbling Towards Ecstasy to be her final record. She spent time working in the studio in Quebec but struggled to produce anything for her new album. At her manager's suggestion, she returned home to Vancouver and took six months off. She said that after this break—and some time spent in therapy—she began to feel more in control of her creativity and started writing material for the album.

One of the first songs written for the album was the hit single "Angel". McLachlan said that writing the song was easy, and "a real joyous occasion." It was inspired by articles that she read in Rolling Stone about musicians who turned to heroin to cope with the pressures of the music industry and subsequently overdosed. She said that she identified with the feelings that might lead someone to use heroin: "I've been in that place where you're so fucked up and you're so lost that you don't know who you are anymore, and you're miserable—and here's this escape route. I've never done heroin, but I've done plenty of other things to escape." She said that the song is about "trying not to take responsibility for other people's shit and trying to love yourself at the same time." Another song that she found easy to write was "Building a Mystery", co-written with her regular collaborator, Canadian musician and producer Pierre Marchand. Marchand heard her playing a guitar riff and suggested adding some lyrics that he had already written. They came up with the rest of the lyrics together, according to McLachlan, "pretty darn quickly." When the album was finished, McLachlan commented, "I was so happy when I could let it go. I didn't give it another thought when it was done."

== Recording and release ==
Like most of McLachlan's albums, Surfacing was recorded at Marchand's Wild Sky Studios in Morin-Heights, Quebec. Marchand, who produced, engineered, and mixed the album, recorded it on an Otari RADAR recorder and a Neumann 149 microphone. McLachlan played piano, acoustic guitar, and electric guitar and Marchand played keyboards, bass, and a drum machine as well as providing background vocals. The other musicians on the album were Jim Creeggan on upright bass, Yves Desrosiers on guitar, musical saw, lap steel guitar and slide bass, Brian Minato on bass and electric guitar, Michel Pepin on electric guitar, and Ashwin Sood (whom McLachlan married in 1997) on percussion and drums.

The album was released on 15 July 1997, on Nettwerk and Arista Records, debuting at No. 1 on the Canadian RPM 100 Albums chart, its lone week on top of the chart. It peaked at No. 2 on the US Billboard 200. It also reached the top 15 in New Zealand, the top 40 in Australia, and the top 50 in the UK and the Netherlands, her first album to chart in all of those countries. The release of the album coincided with the inaugural tour of McLachlan's Lilith Fair in mid-1997.

The first single from the album was "Building a Mystery", released on 9 June 1997; it spent eight weeks at number one on the Canadian singles chart, placing as the number one single of the year; it also topped the Canadian Adult Contemporary Chart. It rose to number 13 on the US Billboard Hot 100. "Sweet Surrender" was released in late 1997 and reached number two on the Canadian Singles and Adult Contemporary Charts and number 28 on the US Hot 100. The third single released from the album was "Adia", released on 2 March 1998. It peaked at number three on both the Canadian Singles Chart and the Billboard Hot 100, also reaching the top 20 in the UK, her first top-20 hit outside of North America. It also topped the Canadian Adult Contemporary Chart while peaking at number five on the US Adult Contemporary Chart, her first single to achieve that. "Angel", released on 28 September 1998, served as the album's final single, reaching number nine in Canada, number four on the Hot 100, the top 10 in Norway (her first top 10 hit outside of North America), the top 20 in Switzerland and Austria, and the top 40 in the UK, the Netherlands and New Zealand (her first hit in all these countries except for the UK). "Angel" was especially successful on the US Adult Contemporary Chart spending 12 weeks at number one, finishing 1999 as the number one Adult Contemporary song of the year, while also ascending to number three on the Canadian Adult Contemporary Chart. "I Love You" rose to number 23 on the Billboard Hot Dance Club Songs in April 2000.

== Critical reception ==
Professional ratings
Review scores
Source	Rating
AllMusic	4/5 stars
Chicago Tribune	3/4 stars
Encyclopedia of Popular Music	4/5 stars
Entertainment Weekly	B
Los Angeles Times	2.5/4 stars
The Rolling Stone Album Guide	3.5/5 stars
The Village Voice	C−

Writing for The New York Times, Sia Michel called the album "lushly atmospheric" but also ambivalent. She said that while the album paints a "vivid emotional landscape", it is at odds with McLachlan's statement that the album was about "'facing ugly things' about herself"; not revealing anything particularly dark. Michel also noted certain old-fashioned ideas in the album, particularly in "Sweet Surrender", that contrast with the work of contemporaries such as Ani DiFranco and PJ Harvey. She cited "Witness" as the highlight and said of the album, "[p]erhaps she hasn't found what she's looking for, but at least she's trying." Elysa Gardner of Los Angeles Times said it "showcases her considerable strengths—a shimmering soprano voice and a knack for intelligent, emotionally forthright lyrics but also suffers from a lack of compelling craftsmanship and textural daring."

Music critic Robert Christgau wrote that although he had stayed away from McLachlan's music in the past, "between her Lilith Fair counterpalooza and 'Building a Mystery' bonanza, [he] had to dive in, and got less than [he'd] bargained for." He criticized McLachlan's "monumental banality" and summed the album up as "renormalized pop at its most unnecessary." A reviewer for Rolling Stone criticized the album's slow tempo, commenting that "if you want a piece of her nirvana, you have to go along at her protracted, glacial pace." They said that McLachlan is too "rigid in her introspection" and that they would like to hear her "work up a good head of steam".

AllMusic's Stephen Thomas Erlewine compared it unfavorably to McLachlan's previous album Fumbling Towards Ecstasy. He said that some of the songs were good, and praised "Building a Mystery" in particular, but said that the album offered nothing new. He also noted that the timing of the release, coinciding with the launch of Lilith Fair and the publicity that McLachlan received from that, helped sales of the album. Jom, a staff reviewer for Sputnikmusic, gave the album a positive review, calling it "one of [McLachlan's] best albums" and praising her "tremendous growth as a songwriter and a musician". In interviews, American hip hop artist Darryl McDaniels of Run-D.M.C. has said that hearing "Angel" on the radio, and subsequently listening to more of McLachlan's music, helped him though a period of depression.

=== Starr report ===
The album was mentioned in the Starr Report, the late 1990s account of Independent Counsel Ken Starr's investigation of the Monica Lewinsky scandal. After a visit to the White House in November 1997, Lewinsky wrote that she "noticed you (President Clinton) had the new Sarah McLachlan CD" and that "whenever I listen to song No. 5 (Do What You Have to Do), I think of you." McLachlan's representatives had no comment on the matter.

=== Awards ===
At the Juno Awards of 1998, McLachlan won four awards: Best Female Vocalist, Songwriter of the Year (with Pierre Marchand, for "Building a Mystery"), Best Album (for Surfacing) and Single of the Year (for "Building a Mystery"). The following year, she did not win any awards, but was nominated for Single of the Year (for "Adia") and Best Video (for "Sweet Surrender").

At the 40th Grammy Awards in 1998, McLachlan was nominated for three awards; she won the awards for Best Female Pop Vocal Performance (for "Building a Mystery") and Best Pop Instrumental Performance (for "Last Dance"). In 1999, she received one more nomination for the album, Best Female Pop Vocal Performance (for "Adia"); she lost to Celine Dion.

== Track listing ==
All tracks written by Sarah McLachlan, except where noted.

Surfacing
No.	Title	Writer(s)	Length
1.	"Building a Mystery"	McLachlan; Pierre Marchand	4:07
2.	"I Love You"		4:44
3.	"Sweet Surrender"		4:00
4.	"Adia"	McLachlan; Marchand	4:05
5.	"Do What You Have to Do"	McLachlan; Colleen Wolstenholme	3:47
6.	"Witness"	McLachlan; Marchand	4:47
7.	"Angel"		4:30
8.	"Black & White"		5:02
9.	"Full of Grace"		3:41
10.	"Last Dance"		2:33
Total length:			41:14

Notes:

- Early editions sold in the U.S. and Canada included a two-song bonus disc containing an alternate mix of "Sweet Surrender" and a rendition of "The Prayer of St. Francis". Both of these tracks appeared on the Japanese edition of the album as well.
- "Full of Grace" previously appeared on the collection Rarities, B-Sides and Other Stuff. The song was also featured in the final moments of the second-season finale of Buffy the Vampire Slayer.

== Personnel ==
- Sarah McLachlan – lead vocals, background vocals, acoustic guitar, electric guitar, piano
- Jim Creeggan – upright bass
- Yves Desrosiers – electric guitar, lap steel guitar, slide bass, saw
- Pierre Marchand – bass guitar, drum machine, background vocals, keyboards
- Brian Minato – bass guitar, electric guitar
- Michel Pepin – electric guitar
- Ashwin Sood – drums, percussion, piano, background vocals

== Charts ==
=== Weekly charts ===
Chart (1997–99)	Peak position
Australian Albums (ARIA)	37
Canadian Albums (Billboard)	1
Dutch Albums (Album Top 100)	52
New Zealand Albums (RMNZ)	13
Scottish Albums (Official Charts)	90
UK Albums (Official Charts)	47
US Billboard 200	2
Chart (1999–2000)	Peak position
US Top Catalog Albums (Billboard)	2

=== Year-end charts ===
Chart (1997)	Position
Canadian Albums (SoundScan)	7
US Billboard 200	49
Chart (1998)	Position
Canadian Albums (SoundScan)	17
Canadian Top Albums/CDs (RPM)	15
US Billboard 200	28
Chart (1999)	Position
US Billboard 200	44
Chart (2000)	Position
US Top Catalog Albums (Billboard)	29
Chart (2002)	Position
Canadian Alternative Albums (SoundScan)	171

== Certifications and sales ==
Region	Certification	Certified units/sales
Australia (ARIA)	Gold	35,000^{^}
Canada (Music Canada)	Diamond	1,078,000
New Zealand (RMNZ)	Gold	7,500^{^}
United Kingdom (BPI)	Gold	100,000^{*}
United States (RIAA)	8× Platinum	8,000,000^{^}
Summaries
Worldwide	—	16,000,000
^{*} Sales figures based on certification alone.^{^} Shipments figures based on certification alone.
