= Sweet Surrender (Sarah McLachlan song) =

1997 single by Sarah McLachlan

Single by Sarah McLachlan

from the album Surfacing
- Released: 1997
- Length: 4:02
- Label: Nettwerk
- Songwriter: Sarah McLachlan
- Producer: Pierre Marchand

Sarah McLachlan singles chronology
| "Building a Mystery" (1997) | "Sweet Surrender" (1997) | "Adia" (1998) |

"Sweet Surrender" is a song by Canadian singer Sarah McLachlan. It was released in late 1997 as the second single from her fourth studio album, Surfacing (1997). The song peaked at number two in Canada and number 28 on the US Billboard Hot 100. In 2001, a maxi-single with remixes by DJ Tiësto was released peaking at number six on the Billboard Dance Club Play chart, three years after its original release.

== Music video ==
The music video was directed by Floria Sigismondi (as Allen Smithee).

== Track listings ==
US and Australian CD single

1. "Sweet Surrender" (album version) – 4:02
2. "Sweet Surrender" (radio mix) – 4:07
3. "Sweet Surrender" (Roni Size remix) – 7:16
4. "Sweet Surrender" (Überzone remix) – 4:29

US cassette single

1. "Sweet Surrender" (album version)
2. "Sweet Surrender" (radio mix)
3. "Sweet Surrender" (Roni Size remix)

European CD single

1. "Sweet Surrender" (Boilerhouse remix) – 3:58
2. "Sweet Surrender" (album version) – 4:00

== Personnel ==
Personnel are lifted from the Surfacing liner notes.

- Sarah McLachlan – writing, vocals, electric guitar, piano
- Brian Minato – electric guitars
- Michel Pépin – electric guitars
- Pierre Marchand – bass, drum machine, production, recording, mixing
- Ash Sood – drums, percussion

== Charts ==
=== Weekly charts ===
| Chart (1997–2001) | Peak position |
|---|---|
| Australia (ARIA) | 196 |
| Canada Top Singles (RPM) | 2 |
| Canada Adult Contemporary (RPM) | 2 |
| Canada Rock/Alternative (RPM) | 3 |
| US Billboard Hot 100 | 28 |
| US Adult Alternative Airplay (Billboard) | 2 |
| US Adult Contemporary (Billboard) | 27 |
| US Adult Pop Airplay (Billboard) | 10 |
| US Alternative Airplay (Billboard) | 14 |
| US Dance Club Songs (Billboard) | 6 |
| US Pop Airplay (Billboard) | 23 |

=== Year-end charts ===
| Chart (1997) | Position |
|---|---|
| Canada Top Singles (RPM) | 78 |
| Canada Rock/Alternative (RPM) | 50 |

| Chart (1998) | Position |
|---|---|
| Canada Top Singles (RPM) | 23 |
| Canada Adult Contemporary (RPM) | 20 |
| Canada Rock/Alternative (RPM) | 28 |
| US Adult Top 40 (Billboard) | 35 |
| US Mainstream Top 40 (Billboard) | 98 |
| US Modern Rock Tracks (Billboard) | 61 |
| US Triple-A (Billboard) | 14 |
