= I Will Remember You (Sarah McLachlan song) =

1995 single by Sarah McLachlan

- 1999 US retail release of the live recording

Single by Sarah McLachlan

from the album The Brothers McMullen soundtrack and Mirrorball
- Released: 1995; 1999 (live)
- Genre: Pop
- Label: Arista
- Songwriters: Sarah McLachlan; Séamus Egan; Dave Merenda
- Producer: Pierre Marchand

Sarah McLachlan singles chronology
"Good Enough" (1994)	"I Will Remember You" (1995)	"Full of Grace" (1996)
"Angel" (1998)	"I Will Remember You" (live) (1999)	"Ice Cream" (live) (1999)

Audio
- "I Will Remember You" (from The Brothers McMullen) by Sarah McLachlan on YouTube

Live video
- "I Will Remember You" (live, from Mirrorball) by Sarah McLachlan on YouTube

"I Will Remember You" is a song written by Sarah McLachlan, Séamus Egan and Dave Merenda. The original inspiration came from Seamus Egan's instrumental song, "Weep Not for the Memories", which appeared on his album A Week in January (1990). McLachlan and Merenda added lyrics and modified the melody for her version. The song first appeared on the soundtrack for the movie The Brothers McMullen in 1995 and was released the same year, when it peaked at number 65 on the US Billboard Hot 100 and number 10 in Canada. It was also featured on McLachlan's 1996 remix album, Rarities, B-Sides and Other Stuff. The Rarities version of the song has three verses, the first of which is omitted during live performances, as heard on her 1999 live album, Mirrorball.

In 1999 McLachlan released the live version of the song from Mirrorball; this release peaked at number 14 in the United States on July 20, 1999, and number 10 in Canada on July 26, topping the country's adult contemporary chart on August 16 and August 23. The live version went Gold in the United States and earned McLachlan her second Grammy Award for Best Female Pop Vocal Performance in 2000 (after winning for "Building a Mystery" in 1998 and being nominated for "Adia" in 1999). McLachlan performed the song during an "in memoriam" slide show at the 61st Primetime Emmy Awards, held on September 20, 2009.

== Critical reception ==
Billboard reviewer Brett Atwood praised the vocal delivery on the studio version along with the "detailed" guitar and piano lines. Steve Baltin from Cash Box chose it as a Pick of the Week, writing, "McLachlan's contribution to the soundtrack of The Brothers McMullen is as good a ballad as will be released this year. Against an alternately sparse and lush arrangement, the Canadian with the voice of an angel beautifully asks the age-old question, "will you remember me when all is said and done?" Reminiscent of her hit from last year, "Good Enough", this song further establishes McLachlan as one of the most gifted singers in pop/rock. As the film's success continues to grow, look for this song to be a smash at Adult Contemporary and to eventually cross over to CHR and Top 40. If this one doesn't move you, you've never been in love."

== Chart performance ==
On the week ending January 20, 1996, the original recording of the song peaked at number 65 on the Billboard Hot 100 chart. The live recording of the song peaked at number two on the Billboard Adult Top 40 chart in July and August 1999 and at number three on the Adult Contemporary chart in August and September 1999. On the week ending July 31, 1999, it peaked at number 14 on the Hot 100. The song has sold more than two million copies worldwide as of February 2000.

== Charts ==
=== Weekly charts ===
Chart (1995–1999)	Peak position
Canada Top Singles (RPM)	10
Canada Adult Contemporary (RPM)	4
Canada Adult Contemporary (RPM) Live version	1
Canada CHR (Nielsen BDS)	14
US Billboard Hot 100	14
US Adult Contemporary (Billboard)	3
US Adult Pop Airplay (Billboard)	2
US Pop Airplay (Billboard)	10

=== Year-end charts ===
Chart (1995)	Position
Canada Top Singles (RPM)	67
Canada Adult Contemporary (RPM)	62

Chart (1999)	Position
Canada Top Singles (RPM)	63
Canada Adult Contemporary (RPM)	9
US Billboard Hot 100	70
US Adult Contemporary (Billboard)	10
US Adult Top 40 (Billboard)	13
US Mainstream Top 40 (Billboard)	44

Chart (2000)	Position
US Adult Contemporary (Billboard)	15

== Certifications ==
Region	Certification	Certified units/sales
United States (RIAA)	Gold	500,000^{^}
^{^} Shipments figures based on certification alone.
