= Stupid (Sarah McLachlan song) =

2004 single by Sarah McLachlan

Single by Sarah McLachlan

from the album Afterglow
- B-side: "World on Fire" (remix)
- Released: March 1, 2004
- Length: 3:24
- Label: Arista; Nettwerk
- Songwriter: Sarah McLachlan
- Producer: Pierre Marchand

Sarah McLachlan singles chronology
"Fallen" (2003)	"Stupid" (2004)	"World on Fire" (2004)

"Stupid" is a song written by Canadian singer-songwriter Sarah McLachlan and produced by Pierre Marchand for McLachlan's fifth studio album, Afterglow (2003). It was released as the album's second single on March 1, 2004. The song became McLachlan's highest-charting solo release in Australia, debuting and peaking at number 37 in June 2004. A remix of the song, titled "The Mark Bell Mix" was featured on So You Think You Can Dance.

== Music video ==
The music video features McLachlan in different time periods and was directed by Sophie Muller.

== Track listing ==
Australian CD single

1. "Stupid" – 3:26
2. "Stupid" (Hyper remix) – 3:26
3. "World on Fire" (Junkie XL club mix) – 12:21
4. "Stupid" (video)

== Charts ==
=== Weekly charts ===
Chart (2004)	Peak position
Australia (ARIA)	37
Canada (Nielsen SoundScan)	9
Canada AC Top 30 (Radio & Records)	3
Canada Hot AC Top 30 (Radio & Records)	2
US Adult Top 40 (Billboard)	15

=== Year-end charts ===
Chart (2004)	Position
US Adult Top 40 (Billboard)	44

== Release history ==
Region	Date	Format(s)	Label(s)	Ref.
United States	March 1, 2003	Adult contemporary; hot adult contemporary; triple-A radio	Arista; Nettwerk	
Australia	May 31, 2004	CD	Arista; Nettwerk	
