= World on Fire (Sarah McLachlan song) =

Single by Sarah McLachlan

Single by Sarah McLachlan

from the album Afterglow
- Released: June 14, 2004
- Genre: Pop
- Label: Nettwerk; Arista
- Songwriters: Sarah McLachlan; Pierre Marchand
- Producer: Pierre Marchand

Sarah McLachlan singles chronology
"Stupid" (2004)	"World on Fire" (2004)	"U Want Me 2" (2008)

"World on Fire" is a song by Canadian singer-songwriter Sarah McLachlan. It was released in June 2004 as the third single from her Afterglow album (2003).

== Background and writing ==
McLachlan wrote the song in the wake of the September 11 attacks.

== Music video ==
The video was directed by Sophie Muller. It opens with the claim of having cost $150,000, despite the ensuing low-quality footage of a barefoot McLachlan in a plain room playing her guitar. The video continues to reveal it actually cost $15, then tracking (in animated and videotaped segments) how the remainder went to enriching lives all around the globe through charitable donations.

== Track listing ==
CD MaxiSingle

1. "World on Fire" – 4:22
2. "World on Fire" (Live Version) – 4:16
3. "World on Fire" (Junkie XL Radio Mix) – 3:46
4. "World on Fire" (Solarstone "Afterhours" Mix) – 8:42
5. "World on Fire" enhance video – 4:22

UK Promo

1. "World on Fire" – 4:22
2. "World on Fire" (Junkie XL Radio Mix) – 3:46

US Promo

1. "World on Fire" (Junkie XL Radio Mix) – 3:46
2. "World on Fire" (Radio Mix) – 4:28
3. "World on Fire" – 4:23
4. Call Out Hook – 0:10

US Promo (Vinyl)

1. "World on Fire" (JXL Club Mix) – 12:24
2. "World on Fire" (JXL Club Mix Edit) – 6:28
3. "World on Fire" (Marius De Vries Mix) – 4:49

CAN Promo

1. "World on Fire" (Junkie XL Radio Mix) – 3:46
2. "World on Fire" (Tom Lord Alge Radio Mix) – 4:25
3. "World on Fire" – 4:22
4. "World on Fire" (Junkie XL Mix Show Edit) – 6:25

UK Promo (Vinyl)

1. "World on Fire" (JXL Club Mix) – 12:24
2. "Stupid" (Hyper Mix)

== Charts ==
Chart (2004)	Peak position
Canada AC Top 30 (Radio & Records)	2
Canada Hot AC Top 30 (Radio & Records)	5
Netherlands (Single Top 100)	92
Scotland Singles (OCC)	72
UK Singles (OCC)	72
US Billboard Adult Pop Songs	14
US Billboard Hot Dance Club Play	2

== Additional information ==
- The eleven charitable organizations McLachlan chose to donate the production costs of "World on Fire" are Carolina for Kibera, Comic Relief, CARE USA, DORCAS, Engineers Without Borders (Canada), Help the Aged, Film Aid, War Child, Heifer International, ITDG, and Action Aid.
- The video was inspired by a letter from an Engineers Without Borders (Canada) volunteer.
- A remix of the song by Junkie XL was featured on the soundtrack of FIFA Soccer 2005.
