= Angel (Sarah McLachlan song) =

1998 single by Sarah McLachlan

Single by Sarah McLachlan

from the album Surfacing and City of Angels
- B-side: "Ice Cream" (live); "I Will Not Forget You" (live)
- Released: 28 September 1998
- Length: 4:30 (album version); 4:00 (radio edit)
- Label: Warner Sunset; Reprise; Arista
- Songwriter: Sarah McLachlan
- Producer: Pierre Marchand

Sarah McLachlan singles chronology
"Adia" (1998)	"Angel" (1998)	"I Will Remember You" (1999)

Music video
- "Angel" on YouTube

"Angel" is a song by Canadian singer-songwriter Sarah McLachlan. The song first appeared on McLachlan's fourth studio album, Surfacing, in 1997 and was released as the album's fourth and final single in September 1998. The lyrics are about the death of musician Jonathan Melvoin (1961–1996) from a heroin overdose, as McLachlan explained on VH1 Storytellers. It is sometimes mistitled as "In the Arms of an Angel" or "Arms of the Angel".

"Angel" was McLachlan's second consecutive top-five hit on the US Billboard Hot 100, peaking at number four. It also spent 12 weeks at number one on the Billboard Adult Contemporary chart, placing as the number-one song on that chart for 1999. In McLachlan's native Canada, it reached number seven on the RPM 100 Hit Tracks chart and number three on the Adult Contemporary chart. Outside North America, the song has charted in several countries in the years following its release, including reaching number seven in Ireland in 2002 and number nine in Norway in 2008.

Despite the meaning and subject matter of this song, "Angel" is often played at funerals and memorial services due to the lyrics, "You're in the arms of the angel. May you find some comfort here".

== Background ==
"Angel" was one of the first songs written for Surfacing. Sarah McLachlan said that writing it was easy, "a real joyous occasion", and that "the bulk of it came in about three hours". It was inspired by articles that she read in Rolling Stone about musicians turning to heroin to cope with the pressures of the music industry and subsequently overdosing, most notably Jonathan Melvoin, a keyboardist for the Smashing Pumpkins, who died of an overdose in 1996. She said that she identified with the feelings that might lead someone to use heroin: "I've been in that place where you've messed up and you're so lost that you don't know who you are anymore, and you're miserable—and here's this escape route. I've never done heroin, but I've done plenty of other things to escape." She said that the song is about "trying not to take responsibility for other people's problems and trying to love yourself at the same time".

== Composition ==
The song has a sparse arrangement, with only three instruments used: a piano played by McLachlan, a drum machine programmed by Pierre Marchand, and upright bass played by Jim Creeggan of Barenaked Ladies. It was recorded in the key of D-flat major. For live performances, it is transposed up one half-step to D major, the key it was originally written in; it is also played without the bass.

== Chart performance ==
Released as a single on 28 September 1998, "Angel" peaked at number four on the US Billboard Hot 100 on 22 February 1999 (spending 19 weeks in the top 10), finishing as the 18th-most popular song of the year. It reached number one on three Billboard charts: the Hot Adult Contemporary Tracks chart, the Adult Top 40 chart, and the Top 40 Tracks chart. It spent 12 weeks at number one on the Hot Adult Contemporary Tracks chart, finishing as the number-one song of the year on that chart. In McLachlan's native Canada, "Angel" peaked at number seven on the RPM 100 Hit Tracks chart in February 1999, ending the year as Canada's 48th-most successful single. It also peaked at number three on the RPM Adult Contemporary chart.

In the years following its release, "Angel" has charted in a large number of countries. On 21 January 2002, British producers Rollo Armstrong and Mark Bates (as their joint venture Dusted) released a remix that peaked at number seven in Ireland and number 36 in the United Kingdom. In 2008, "Angel" charted in Norway and peaked at number nine for two weeks. The following year, it made a brief appearance on the New Zealand Singles Chart, debuting and peaking at number 36 in July. The song has charted in Austria and Switzerland on several occasions, peaking at number 17 in both counties, and it also reached number 57 in Germany in October 2012. The following month, it debuted and peaked at number 77 in France. During its original release, "Angel" peaked at number 99 on the Dutch Single Top 100, but it reached a new peak of number 31 in February 2014.

== Live performances ==
On 8 April 2000, McLachlan performed "Angel" with Carlos Santana on guitar at the Pasadena Civic Auditorium in Pasadena, California. The show was televised on Fox TV and released on the DVD Supernatural Live – An Evening with Carlos Santana and Friends. On 2 July 2005, McLachlan performed this song at Live 8 Philadelphia with Josh Groban, and continued in 2016 with Groban. She also performed the song during the "Concert for Linda," dedicating it to the memory of Linda McCartney. On 10 September 2011, McLachlan performed the song to close the ceremonies at the dedication of the Flight 93 Memorial in Stonycreek Township, commemorating the passengers and crew of United Airlines Flight 93 who fought the hijackers and brought down their airplane in the September 11 attacks. On 23 November 2008, Sarah McLachlan performed "Angel" at the American Music Awards with artist Pink. On 21 May 2019, McLachlan sang "Angel" on the sixteenth season of the US competition series The Voice as a duet with the eventual winner of the show, Maelyn Jarmon. On 21 April 2020, McLachlan and her daughter, India Sood, performed a duet, posted to Facebook, as a response to the killing spree in Nova Scotia.

== Reception ==
According to Vivian Rashotte of CBC Radio, "With its sombre melody and heart-wrenching lyrics, Angel quickly became the unofficial anthem of mourning following tragic events, such as the death of Princess Diana in 1997, the 1999 Columbine High School massacre and the September 11, 2001 attacks. Today, it's recognized as the de facto song of sorrow and healing for both public and private experiences of loss."

Darryl McDaniels of the rap group Run-DMC credited the song to saving his life when he was suicidal.

== Track listings ==
US CD and cassette single (1999)

1. "Angel" – 4:30
2. "Ice Cream" (live) – 3:33
3. "I Will Not Forget You" (live) – 5:37

European CD single 1 (1999)

1. "Angel" (radio mix) – 3:59
2. "Ice Cream" (live) – 3:25

European CD single 2 (1999)

1. "Angel" (radio mix) – 3:59
2. "Angel" (album version) – 4:30
3. "Ice Cream" (live) – 3:25
4. "I Will Not Forget You" (live) – 5:37

UK 12-inch vinyl (2002)

A1. "Angel" (Dusted Remix) – 5:28
A2. "Silence" (Michael Woods Mix edit) – 7:11
B1. "Sweet Surrender" (DJ Tiësto Remix) – 7:04

UK CD single – Disc A (2002)

1. "Angel" (radio edit) – 3:40
2. "Silence" (Fade Sanctuary Mix edit) – 3:50
3. "Sweet Surrender" (DJ Tiësto Remix) – 7:04

UK CD single – Disc AA (2002)

1. "Angel" (Dusted Remix edit) – 3:42
2. "Sweet Surrender" (Boilerhouse Boys Mix) – 3:56
3. "Silence" (Michael Woods Mix) – 8:08

== Personnel ==
Personnel are lifted from the Surfacing liner notes.

- Sarah McLachlan – writing, vocals, piano
- Pierre Marchand – drum machine
- Jim Creeggan – upright bass

== Charts ==
=== Weekly charts ===
Chart (1998–2015)	Peak position
Australia (ARIA) Double A-side with "Adia"	55
Australia (ARIA)	153
Austria (Ö3 Austria Top 40)	17
Canada Top Singles (RPM)	7
Canada Adult Contemporary (RPM)	3
France (SNEP)	77
Germany (GfK)	57
Ireland (IRMA)	7
Ireland Dance (IRMA)	1
Luxembourg Digital Songs (Billboard)	9
Netherlands (Single Top 100)	31
New Zealand (Recorded Music NZ)	36
Norway (VG-lista)	9
Scottish Singles Sales (Official Charts)	33
Switzerland (Schweizer Hitparade)	17
UK Singles (Official Charts)	36
UK Dance (Official Charts)	5
UK Indie (Official Charts)	7
US Billboard Hot 100	4
US Adult Alternative Airplay (Billboard)	8
US Adult Contemporary (Billboard)	1
US Adult Pop Airplay (Billboard)	1
US Pop Airplay (Billboard)	4
US Top 40 Tracks (Billboard)	1

=== Year-end charts ===
Chart (1998)	Position
US Adult Top 40 (Billboard)	92

Chart (1999)	Position
Canada Top Singles (RPM)	48
Canada Adult Contemporary (RPM)	11
US Billboard Hot 100	18
US Adult Contemporary (Billboard)	1
US Adult Top 40 (Billboard)	6
US Hot Soundtrack Singles (Billboard)	3
US Mainstream Top 40 (Billboard)	18
US Top 40 Tracks (Billboard)	14

Chart (2000)	Position
US Adult Contemporary (Billboard)	23

Chart (2002)	Position
Ireland (IRMA)	46

== Certifications and sales ==
Region	Certification	Certified units/sales
United Kingdom (BPI)	Gold	400,000^{‡}
United States (RIAA)	Gold	500,000^{^}
^{^} Shipments figures based on certification alone.^{‡} Sales+streaming figures based on certification alone.

== Release history ==
Region	Date	Format(s)	Label(s)	Ref.
United States	28 September 1998	Contemporary hit radio	Warner Sunset; Reprise	
Denmark	20 September 1999	CD	Arista	
United Kingdom	21 January 2002	12-inch vinyl; CD	Nettwerk	

== In popular culture ==
Since 2008, the song has become notable for being featured in television commercials with McLachlan for the ASPCA.

It was featured in the 1998 film City of Angels and on the accompanying soundtrack album.

== See also ==
- List of Billboard Adult Contemporary number ones of 1999
