= Fumbling Towards Ecstasy =

Studio album by Sarah McLachlan
- Released: October 22, 1993
- Recorded: 1993
- Studios: Le Studio (Morin Heights, Quebec)
- Genres: Pop; soft rock; alternative rock
- Length: 57:50
- Labels: Nettwerk; Arista
- Producer: Pierre Marchand

Sarah McLachlan chronology
Solace (1991)	Fumbling Towards Ecstasy (1993)	The Freedom Sessions (1994)

Singles from Fumbling Towards Ecstasy
- 1. "Possession" Released: September 10, 1993; 2. "Hold On" Released: May 8, 1994; 3. "Good Enough" Released: September 12, 1994

Fumbling Towards Ecstasy is the third studio album by Canadian singer-songwriter Sarah McLachlan, released on October 22, 1993. It was produced by Pierre Marchand in Montreal; McLachlan wrote most of the album while living in a small house near Marchand's studio. The album was an immediate hit in Canada, where McLachlan was already an established star. It was slower to become her breakthrough album internationally, however; in some countries, most notably the US, it stayed in the middle ranges of the pop charts for almost two years. As of November 2003, the album had sold 2.8 million copies in the US.

Some editions contain an album version of McLachlan's 1995 single used for The Brothers McMullen soundtrack, "I Will Remember You". The track's lyrics do not appear in the booklet, nor does the track's crediting information. On August 5, 2008, a three-disc 15th anniversary edition of the album was released. The set includes the original remastered album, The Freedom Sessions EP and a DVD that includes live performances, music videos and more. The album was released by Legacy Recordings.

In December 2023, McLachlan announced she would perform on a 30-city tour in 2024 for the 30th anniversary of Fumbling Towards Ecstasy, playing the entire album in shows along with other songs.

== Critical reception ==
Professional ratings
Review scores
Source	Rating
AllMusic	4.5/5 stars
Chicago Tribune	4/4 stars
Entertainment Weekly	A
Hot Press	10/12
Los Angeles Times	2.5/4 stars
Pitchfork	8.2/10
PopMatters	8/10
Rolling Stone	4/5 stars
The Rolling Stone Album Guide	4/5 stars
Slant Magazine	4.5/5 stars

Chicago Tribune critic Dan Kening praised Fumbling Towards Ecstasy as "a terrific album from a gifted 26-year-old Canadian who is mature beyond her years", highlighting McLachlan's "hauntingly beautiful voice" and the songs' "gorgeous arrangements". Similarly, Entertainment Weekly's David Bock opined that McLachlan's songs "probe the deeper, darker aspects of the human condition with an honesty, patience, and wisdom way beyond her 26 years." Comparing the record to its predecessor Solace (1991), Elysa Gardner of Rolling Stone wrote that despite its "less buoyant hooks and more muted arrangements", "there are moments of quiet radiance on Ecstasy, and even the more elusive songs reveal a passionate dignity."

In a retrospective review for AllMusic, Andrew Leahey called Fumbling Towards Ecstasy "a softly assured album that combined the atmospheric production of Pierre Marchand ... with some of McLachlan's strongest songwriting to date", adding that "McLachlan's work was rarely as raw or honest as it is on this record". Richard Skanse, writing in the 2004 Rolling Stone Album Guide, said that McLachlan "truly came into her own as an artist" on the album, finding her lyrics "sharper, her trademark earnestness now carrying a formidable edge." In 2000, it was voted number 200 in Colin Larkin's All Time Top 1000 Albums, and in 2022, Pitchfork listed it as the 119th-best album of the 1990s. Slant Magazine included it on their 2003 list of 50 Essential Pop Albums.

== Track listing ==
All tracks are written by Sarah McLachlan, except "Fumbling Towards Ecstasy" co-written with Pierre Marchand.

No.	Title	Length
1.	"Possession"	4:39
2.	"Wait"	4:09
3.	"Plenty"	4:05
4.	"Good Enough"	5:03
5.	"Mary"	3:55
6.	"Elsewhere"	4:44
7.	"Circle"	3:43
8.	"Ice"	3:54
9.	"Hold On"	4:09
10.	"Ice Cream"	2:44
11.	"Fear"	3:59
12.	"Fumbling Towards Ecstasy" "Ice" / "Possession" (hidden track)	9:49
Total length:		54:57

Notes:

- A hidden track follows "Fumbling Towards Ecstasy" which consists of a brief outtake snippet of "Ice" at 5:22 and a solo piano rendition of "Possession" at 5:48.
- Original UK and Japanese versions of the album, along with the 2016 single-disc vinyl edition, include a cover of "Blue" by Joni Mitchell as a bonus track. These editions also do not include the hidden track appearing after "Fumbling Towards Ecstasy".

== Personnel ==
- Sarah McLachlan – vocals, acoustic and electric guitars, piano
- Bill Dillon – acoustic and electric guitars, guitorgan, bass guitar, piano
- Michel Dubeau – saxophone
- Kharen Hill – photography
- David Kershaw – Hammond organ
- Pierre Marchand – bass guitar, piano, keyboards, fake Hammond B-3 organ, drum machine, percussion machine, Roland 808, shaker, found sound
- Jerry Marotta – drums, percussion
- Brian Minato – bass guitar
- Guy Nadon – drums
- Jane Scarpantoni – cello
- Lou Shefano – drums
- Ashwin Sood – drums, percussion

== Charts ==
=== Weekly charts ===
Chart (1993–1995)	Peak position
Australian Albums (ARIA)	102
Canada Top Albums/CDs (RPM)	5
Canadian Albums (The Record)	6
US Billboard 200	50

Chart (1996–1999)	Peak position
US Top Catalog Albums (Billboard)	2

=== Year-end charts ===
Chart (1993)	Position
Canada Top Albums/CDs (RPM)	52
Chart (1994)	Position
Canada Top Albums/CDs (RPM)	86
Chart (1995)	Position
US Billboard 200	120
Chart (1997)	Position
US Top Catalog Albums (Billboard)	14
Chart (1998)	Position
US Top Catalog Albums (Billboard)	17

== Certifications and sales ==
Region	Certification	Certified units/sales
Canada (Music Canada)	5× Platinum	500,000^{^}
United States (RIAA)	3× Platinum	3,000,000^{^}
^{^} Shipments figures based on certification alone.

== Release history ==
Region	Date	Label	Format	Catalogue
Canada	22 October 1993	Nettwerk	CD	W2-30081
United States	15 February 1994	Arista Records	CD	07822-18725-2
Japan	24 May 1994	BMG Japan	CD	BVCA-638
Australia	14 August 1994	Arista Records	CD	07822-18725-2
