= Sarah McLachlan discography =

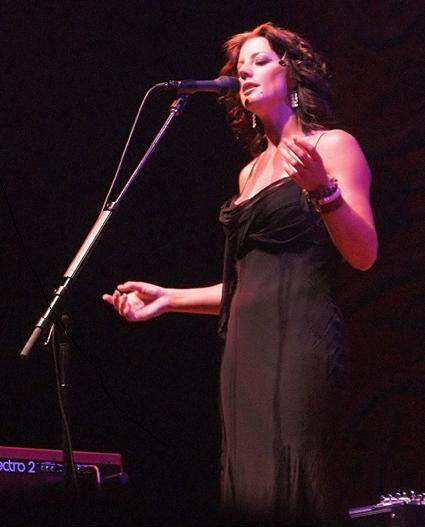
- McLachlan in 2005
- Studio albums: 10
- Extended plays: 3
- Live albums: 3
- Compilation albums: 7
- Singles: 54
- Video albums: 9
- Remix albums: 3

The Canadian singer Sarah McLachlan has released 10 studio albums, 54 singles, three extended plays (EPs), seven compilation albums, three live albums, nine video albums, and three remix albums. Her debut album, Touch was released in 1988 and included first singles: "Vox", "Steaming" and "Ben's Song". The album charted in Canada and the United States and was certified platinum in Canada and gold in the US. The next album, Solace was issued in 1991. It peaked at number 20 in Canada and was certified double platinum there. Solace also charted in the US, where it was certified gold. It featured three singles: "The Path of Thorns (Terms)", "Into the Fire" and "Drawn to the Rhythm". The third studio album, Fumbling Towards Ecstasy (1993) became McLachlan's mainstream breakthrough album in Canada and the United States. It peaked at number five in Canada and number 50 on the US Billboard 200, and was certified 5× platinum in Canada and 3× platinum in the US. "Possession" and "Good Enough" became McLachlan's first singles to chart on the US Billboard Hot 100. "Good Enough" also became her first top 10 hit in Canada, reaching number nine. At the 37th Annual Grammy Awards, Fumbling Towards Ecstasy was nominated for the Grammy Award for Best Alternative Music Performance.

In 1997, McLachlan released her most successful album to date, Surfacing. It topped the chart in Canada and reached number two in the United States, and also charted in various countries around the world. Surfacing was certified diamond in Canada for selling over one million copies, 8× platinum in the US for selling eight million copies, and gold in other countries. Surfacing featured the hit singles: "Building a Mystery", "Sweet Surrender", "Adia" and "Angel". All singles charted inside top 10 in Canada, including number one for "Building a Mystery". All singles charted on the Billboard Hot 100, and two of them became McLachlan's first top 10 hits on that chart: "Adia" at number three and "Angel" at number four. At the 40th Annual Grammy Awards, "Building a Mystery" won a Grammy Award for Best Female Pop Vocal Performance and "Last Dance" from Surfacing won a Grammy Award for Best Pop Instrumental Performance. Surfacing was also nominated for the Grammy Award for Best Pop Album. At the 41st Annual Grammy Awards, "Adia" was nominated for Best Female Pop Vocal Performance.

McLachlan's 1999 live album, Mirrorball was also very successful. It topped the chart in Canada and reached number three in the US. It was certified 5× platinum in Canada and 3× platinum in the US. McLachlan's 1995 song, "I Will Remember You" now in live version was released as the lead single from Mirrorball. In 1995, the song already reached number 10 in Canada and number 65 on the Billboard Hot 100. This new live version reached number 10 in Canada again but achieved a new peak on the Billboard Hot 100 at number 14, solely on airplay. At the 42nd Annual Grammy Awards, "I Will Remember You" (Live) won a Grammy Award for Best Female Pop Vocal Performance, Mirrorball was nominated for Best Pop Album and "Possession" (Live) was nominated for the Grammy Award for Best Female Rock Vocal Performance. "Silence" by Delerium featuring McLachlan became one of the greatest trance songs of all time. The original version, released as a single in 1999, was remixed many times over the years to a great success on the charts. "Silence" topped the US Dance Club Songs and reached number one in Ireland. It also peaked at number two in Belgium, number three in the United Kingdom, number five in Canada, number six in Australia, number seven in the Netherlands, and charted in many other countries.

In 2003, McLachlan returned to public life with her fifth studio album, Afterglow. It topped the chart in Canada, reached number two in the US and charted in many countries around the world. Afterglow was certified 5× platinum in Canada, 2× platinum in the US, and gold in other countries. At the 46th Annual Grammy Awards, "Fallen" from Afterglow was nominated for the Grammy Award for Best Female Pop Vocal Performance, and at the 47th Annual Grammy Awards, Afterglow was nominated for the Best Pop Vocal Album. At the 48th Annual Grammy Awards, Afterglow's "World on Fire" music video was nominated for the Grammy Award for Best Short Form Music Video. In 2006, McLachlan released her first Christmas album, Wintersong. It peaked at number one in Canada and number seven in the US, and was certified 3× platinum in Canada and platinum in the US. At the 49th Annual Grammy Awards, Wintersong was nominated for the Grammy Award for Best Traditional Pop Vocal Album.

In 2008, McLachlan issued her first greatest hits album, Closer: The Best of Sarah McLachlan, which reached number three in Canada and was certified platinum there. It was followed by 2010's Laws of Illusion, 2014's Shine On and 2016's Wonderland. Over the years, McLachlan also released compilations with rare songs like Rarities, B-Sides and Other Stuff (1996) and Rarities, B-Sides and Other Stuff Volume 2 (2008), and albums with remixes: Remixed (2001) and Bloom: Remix Album (2005). In 1994, she also released The Freedom Sessions with alternative versions of her songs from Fumbling Towards Ecstasy. As of 2015, McLachlan has sold over 40 million albums worldwide.

== Albums ==
=== Studio albums ===
Title	Album details	Peak chart positions										Certifications
Title	Album details	CAN	AUS	GER	IRE	NLD	NOR	NZ	SWI	UK	US	Certifications
Touch	Released: 11 October 1988; Label: Nettwerk; Formats: CD, LP, cassette	61 (Note: The RPM Albums Chart between October 1988 and April 1989 is not available. The Touch peak position is taken from May 1989.)	—	—	—	—	—	—	—	—	132	MC: Platinum; RIAA: Gold
Solace	Released: 29 June 1991; Label: Nettwerk/Arista; Formats: CD, LP, cassette	20	—	—	—	—	—	—	—	—	167	MC: 2× Platinum; RIAA: Gold
Fumbling Towards Ecstasy	Released: 22 October 1993; Label: Nettwerk/Arista; Formats: CD, LP, cassette	5	102	—	—	—	—	—	—	—	50	MC: 5× Platinum; RIAA: 3× Platinum
Surfacing	Released: 15 July 1997; Label: Nettwerk/Arista; Formats: CD, LP, cassette	1	37	—	—	52	—	13	—	47	2	MC: Diamond; ARIA: Gold; BPI: Gold; RMNZ: Gold; RIAA: 8× Platinum
Afterglow	Released: 4 November 2003; Label: Nettwerk/Arista; Formats: CD, LP, cassette	1	22	25	20	23	14	30	19	33	2	MC: 5× Platinum; ARIA: Gold; BPI: Gold; RIAA: 2× Platinum
Wintersong	Released: 17 October 2006; Label: Nettwerk/Arista; Formats: CD, LP, digital	1	—	—	—	—	—	—	—	—	7	MC: 3× Platinum; RIAA: Platinum
Laws of Illusion	Released: 15 June 2010; Label: Nettwerk/Arista; Formats: CD, LP, digital	2	12	80	100	73	—	9	49	76	3	
Shine On	Released: 6 May 2014; Label: Verve; Formats: CD, LP, digital	1	26	—	—	97	—	—	—	71	4	MC: Gold
Wonderland	Released: 21 October 2016; Label: Verve; Formats: CD, LP, digital	12	68	—	—	—	—	—	—	—	56	MC: Gold
Better Broken	Released: 19 September 2025; Label: Concord; Formats: CD, LP, digital	28	33	—	—	—	—	—	—	—	96	
"—" denotes releases that did not chart or were not released.

=== Live albums ===
Title	Album details	Peak chart positions			Certifications
Title	Album details	CAN	NZ	US	Certifications
Mirrorball	Released: 15 June 1999; Label: Nettwerk/Arista; Formats: CD, LP, cassette	1	13	3	MC: 5× Platinum; BPI: Silver; RIAA: 3× Platinum; RMNZ: Gold
Afterglow Live	Released: 7 November 2004; Label: Nettwerk/Arista; Formats: DVD/CD	—	—	107	MC: Gold
Mirrorball: The Complete Concert	Released: 3 October 2006; Label: Nettwerk/Arista; Formats: 2CD, digital	—	—	—	
"—" denotes releases that did not chart or were not released.

=== Compilation albums ===
Title	Album details	Peak chart positions							Certifications
Title	Album details	CAN	AUS	IRE	NOR	NZ	UK	US	Certifications
Rarities, B-Sides and Other Stuff	Released: 17 June 1996; Label: Nettwerk/Arista; Formats: CD, cassette	6	147	—	—	—	—	—	MC: 3× Platinum
iTunes Originals – Sarah McLachlan	Released: 17 May 2005; Label: Nettwerk/Arista; Formats: digital	—	—	—	—	—	—	—	
Rarities, B-Sides and Other Stuff Volume 2	Released: 29 April 2008; Label: Nettwerk/Arista; Formats: CD, digital	2	—	—	—	—	193	44	MC: Gold
Closer: The Best of Sarah McLachlan	Released: 7 October 2008; Label: Nettwerk/Arista; Formats: CD, 2CD, digital	3	62	47	19	9	192	11	MC: Platinum; BPI: Silver
The Essential Sarah McLachlan	Released: 20 August 2013; Label: Legacy; Formats: 2CD, digital	—	—	—	—	—	—	—	BPI: Silver
The Box Set Series	Released: 26 May 2015; Label: Legacy; Formats: 4CD	—	—	—	—	—	—	—	
The Classic Christmas Album	Released: 2 October 2015; Label: Legacy; Formats: CD, digital	—	—	—	—	—	—	199	
"—" denotes releases that did not chart or were not released.

=== Remix albums ===
Title	Album details	Peak chart positions			Certifications
Title	Album details	CAN	AUS	US	Certifications
The Freedom Sessions	Released: 6 December 1994; Label: Nettwerk/Arista; Formats: CD, cassette	36	—	78	MC: Platinum; RIAA: Gold
Remixed	Released: 26 June 2001; Label: Nettwerk/Arista; Formats: CD, LP	10	138	200	MC: Platinum
Bloom: Remix Album	Released: 6 September 2005; Label: Nettwerk/Arista; Formats: CD, digital	22	147	76	
"—" denotes releases that did not chart or were not released.

== EPs ==
Title	EP details	Peak chart positions
Title	EP details	CAN
Live	Released: 9 October 1992; Label: Nettwerk/Arista; Formats: CD	—
Live Acoustic	Released: 31 May 2004; Label: Nettwerk/Arista; Formats: CD, digital	23
Live from Etown: 2006 Christmas Special	Released: 19 December 2006; Label: Nettwerk/Arista; Formats: digital	—
"—" denotes releases that did not chart or were not released.

== Singles ==
=== As main artist ===
List of singles, with selected chart positions and certifications, showing year released and album name
Title	Year	Peak chart positions										Certifications	Album
Title	Year	CAN	CAN AC	AUS	GER	IRE	NLD	UK	US	US AC	US Dance	Certifications	Album
"Vox"	1988	90	—	—	—	—	—	—	—	—	—		Touch
"Steaming"	1989	—	—	—	—	—	—	—	—	—	38		Touch
"Ben's Song" (Note: "Ben's Song" was released in Japan only.)	1990	—	—	—	—	—	—	—	—	—	—		Touch
"The Path of Thorns (Terms)"	1991	24	12	—	—	—	—	—	—	—	—		Solace
"Into the Fire"	1991	30	—	—	—	—	—	—	— (Note: "Into the Fire" did not enter the Billboard Hot 100, but peaked at number 4 on the Alternative Songs chart.)	—	—		Solace
"Drawn to the Rhythm"	1992	56	12	—	—	—	—	—	—	—	—		Solace
"I Will Not Forget You"	1992	—	—	—	—	—	—	—	—	—	—		Solace
"Wear Your Love Like Heaven"	1992	—	—	—	—	—	—	—	—	—	—		Solace
"Possession"	1993	26	—	129	—	—	—	—	73	—	30		Fumbling Towards Ecstasy
"Hold On"	1994	59	—	—	—	—	—	—	—	—	—		Fumbling Towards Ecstasy
"Fumbling Towards Ecstasy"	1994	58	—	—	—	—	—	—	—	—	—		Fumbling Towards Ecstasy
"Good Enough"	1994	9	3	—	—	—	—	—	77	—	—		Fumbling Towards Ecstasy
"Circle" (Note: "Circle" was released as a promotional single in Germany only.)	1995	—	—	—	—	—	—	—	—	—	—		Fumbling Towards Ecstasy
"Ol' '55"	1995	66	—	—	—	—	—	—	—	—	—		The Freedom Sessions
"I Will Remember You"	1995	10	4	—	—	—	—	95	65	20	—	RIAA: Gold	The Brothers McMullen (Note: "I Will Remember You" was later included on Rarities, B-Sides and Other Stuff.)
"Dear God"	1995	68	42	—	—	—	—	—	—	—	—		A Testimonial Dinner: The Songs of XTC (Note: "Dear God" was later included on Rarities, B-Sides and Other Stuff.)
"Full of Grace" (Note: "Full of Grace" was later included on Surfacing.)	1996	—	16	—	—	—	—	—	—	—	—		Rarities, B-Sides and Other Stuff
"Building a Mystery"	1997	1	1	97	—	—	—	—	13	28	—		Surfacing
"Sweet Surrender"	1997	2	2	196	—	—	—	—	28	27	6		Surfacing
"Adia"	1998	3	1	55 (Note: "Adia" and "Angel" charted as a double A-side single in Australia. "Angel" later charted separately at number 153.)	96	—	85	18	3	5	—	RIAA: Gold	Surfacing
"Angel"	1998	9	3	55	57	7	31	36	4	1	—	BPI: Silver; RIAA: Gold	Surfacing
"I Will Remember You" (Live)	1999	10	1	—	—	—	—	—	14	3	—		Mirrorball
"Ice Cream" (Live)	1999	9	12	—	—	—	—	—	—	—	—		Mirrorball
"I Love You" (Remix)	2000	—	—	—	—	—	—	—	—	—	23		Surfacing (Note: "I Love You" (Remix) was later included on Remixed.)
"Fallen"	2003	—	18	41	—	32	89	50	41	12	3	RIAA: Gold	Afterglow
"Stupid"	2004	9	3	37	—	—	—	—	—	—			Afterglow
"World on Fire"	2004	—	2	—	—	92	—	72	—	—	2		Afterglow
"Push" (Live)	2004	—	—	—	—	—	—	—	—	—	—		Afterglow Live
"Train Wreck" (Remix)	2005	—	—	—	—	—	—	—	—	—	—		Bloom: Remix Album
"River"	2006	2	1	—	—	—	—	—	71	8	—		Wintersong
"Happy Xmas (War Is Over)"	2006	—	3	—	—	—	—	—	— (Note: "Happy Xmas (War Is Over)" did not enter the Billboard Hot 100, but peaked at number 7 on the Bubbling Under Hot 100 Singles chart.)	5	—		Wintersong
"Have Yourself a Merry Little Christmas"	2006	— (Note: "Have Yourself a Merry Little Christmas" peaked at number 59 on the Hot Canadian Digital Songs chart.)	47	—	—	—	—	—	—	6	—		Wintersong
"The First Noel / Mary Mary"	2006	—	—	—	—	—	—	—	—	—	—		Wintersong
"Wintersong"	2007	— (Note: "Wintersong" peaked at number 41 on the Hot Canadian Digital Songs chart.)	—	—	—	—	—	—	—	—	—		Wintersong
"Ordinary Miracle"	2007	66 (Note: The Canadian Hot 100 was launched in June 2007 and the "Ordinary Miracle" peak position is taken from the first issue of this chart. The charts between January and May 2007 are not available.)	9	—	—	—	—	—	—	18	—		Charlotte's Web (Note: "Ordinary Miracle" was later included on Rarities, B-Sides and Other Stuff Volume 2.)
"U Want Me 2"	2008	11	1	96	—	—	—	—	— (Note: "U Want Me 2" did not enter the Billboard Hot 100, but peaked at number 5 on the Bubbling Under Hot 100 Singles chart.)	18	—		Closer: The Best of Sarah McLachlan
"Don't Give Up on Us"	2009	96	30	—	—	—	—	—	—	—	—		Closer: The Best of Sarah McLachlan
"One Dream"	2009	52	8	—	—	—	—	—	—	—	—		Non-album single (Note: "One Dream" was later included on the Japanese edition of Laws of Illusion.)
"Loving You Is Easy"	2010	59	5	—	—	—	—	—	—	14	—		Laws of Illusion
"Forgiveness"	2010	71	36	—	—	—	—	—	—	—	—		Laws of Illusion
"Illusions of Bliss"	2011	—	21	—	—	—	—	—	—	—	—		Laws of Illusion
"Space on the Couch for Two" (Note: "Space on the Couch for Two" was released as a free download.) (featuring The Sarah McLachlan School Choir)	2011	—	—	—	—	—	—	—	—	—	—		Non-album single (Note: "Space on the Couch for Two" was later included on The Classic Christmas Album.)
"Find Your Voice" (Note: "Find Your Voice" was released as a free download.) (featuring The Sarah McLachlan School Choir)	2012	—	11	—	—	—	—	—	—	—	—		Non-album single (Note: "Find Your Voice" was later included on The Classic Christmas Album.)
"What's It Gonna Take"	2013	—	—	—	—	—	—	—	—	—	—		King Kong (Note: "What's It Gonna Take" was later included on the deluxe edition of Shine On.)
"Prayer of Saint Francis" (Note: "Prayer of Saint Francis" was released as a free download.) (featuring The Sarah McLachlan School Choir)	2013	—	—	—	—	—	—	—	—	—	—		Non-album single (Note: "Prayer of Saint Francis" was later included on The Classic Christmas Album.)
"In Your Shoes"	2014	—	22	—	—	—	—	—	—	21	—		Shine On
"Monsters"	2014	—	—	—	—	—	—	—	—	—	—		Shine On
"The Long Goodbye"	2016	—	—	—	—	—	—	—	—	—	—		Non-album single
"Better Broken"	2025	—	—	—	—	—	—	—	—	12	—		Better Broken
"—" denotes a title that did not chart, or was not released in that territory

=== As featured artist ===
List of singles, with selected chart positions, showing year released
Title	Year	Peak chart positions									Certifications	Album
Title	Year	CAN	AUS	GER	IRE	NLD	NOR	UK	US AC	US Dance	Certifications	Album
"Silence" (Delerium featuring Sarah McLachlan)	1999	—	6	—	1	33	—	73	—	—	ARIA: Platinum	Karma (Note: "Silence" (DJ Tiësto's in Search of Sunrise Remix) was later included on McLachlan's Remixed.)
"Silence (Remixes)" (Delerium featuring Sarah McLachlan)	2000	5	—	16	6	7	15	3	—	6	BPI: Silver	Karma
"God Rest You Merry, Gentlemen / We Three Kings" (Barenaked Ladies featuring Sarah McLachlan) (Note: "God Rest You Merry, Gentlemen / We Three Kings" peaked at number 62 on the US Holiday Songs chart and number 22 on the US Holiday Digital Songs chart.)	2003	— (Note: "God Rest You Merry, Gentlemen / We Three Kings" peaked at number 25 on the Hot Canadian Digital Songs chart.)	—	—	—	—	—	—	—	—		Barenaked for the Holidays (Note: "God Rest You Merry, Gentlemen / We Three Kings" was later included on McLachlan's The Classic Christmas Album.)
"Silence 2004" (Delerium featuring Sarah McLachlan)	2004	—	—	—	27	—	—	38	—	1		The Best Of
"Pills" (Live) (The Perishers featuring Sarah McLachlan)	2005	—	—	—	—	—	—	—	—	—		The Perishers Live (Note: "Pills" (Live) was later included on McLachlan's Rarities, B-Sides and Other Stuff Volume 2.)
"Time After Time" (Cyndi Lauper featuring Sarah McLachlan)	2005	— (Note: "Time After Time" peaked at number 28 on the Hot Canadian Digital Songs chart.)	—	—	—	—	—	—	14	—		The Body Acoustic (Note: "Time After Time" was later included on McLachlan's Rarities, B-Sides and Other Stuff Volume 2.)
"Sing" (Annie Lennox featuring various artists)	2007	—	—	—	—	—	—	161	29	18		Songs of Mass Destruction
"Silence 2008" (Delerium featuring Sarah McLachlan)	2008	—	—	87	—	48	—	127	—	—		Closer: The Best of Sarah McLachlan (European edition)
"Silence 2010" (Delerium featuring Sarah McLachlan)	2010	—	—	—	—	—	—	171	—	—		Remixed: The Definitive Collection
"—" denotes a title that did not chart, or was not released in that territory

== Collaborations ==
Year	Title	Artist	Album
1987	"As the End Draws Near"	Manufacture	Terrorvision
1992	"Tightrope Walker"	Balloon	Gravity
1993	"What Is This Love"	Blue Rodeo	Five Days in July
1993	"Dark Angel"	Blue Rodeo	Five Days in July
1993	"Tell Me Your Dream"	Blue Rodeo	Five Days in July
1993	"Expectations"	Stephen Fearing	The Assassin's Apprentice
1995	"Burned Out Car"	Junkhouse	Birthday Boy
1995	"Save Myself"	Blue Rodeo	Nowhere to Here
1995	"Girl in Green"	Blue Rodeo	Nowhere to Here
1995	"Brown-Eyed Dog"	Blue Rodeo	Nowhere to Here
1997	"Silence"	Delerium	Karma
2000	"Love Is"	Stevie Nicks	Trouble in Shangri-La
2002	"Don't Let Go"	Bryan Adams	Spirit: Stallion of the Cimarron soundtrack
2002	"Long Way Down"	Swollen Members	Monsters in the Closet (Swollen Members album)
2003	"God Rest Ye Merry Gentlemen"	Barenaked Ladies	Barenaked for the Holidays
2004	"Silence 2004"	Delerium	The Best of Delerium
2005	"Pills"	The Perishers	The Perishers Live
2005	"Time After Time"	Cyndi Lauper	The Body Acoustic
2005	"Water's Edge"	Cyndi Lauper	The Body Acoustic
2005	"I Would Die for You"	Jann Arden	Jann Arden
2006	"Homeless"	Ladysmith Black Mambazo	Long Walk To Freedom
2006	"Go Down Matthew"	Melissa McClelland	Thumbelina's One Night Stand
2006	"Just Like Me"	DMC	Checks Thugs and Rock N Roll
2006	"Miss You"	Greg Keelor	Aphrodite Rose
2006	"Glory Oh"	Greg Keelor	Aphrodite Rose
2006	"Aphrodite Rose"	Greg Keelor	Aphrodite Rose
2006	"High Meadow"	Greg Keelor	Aphrodite Rose
2006	"Dirty Little Secret"	Thievery Corporation	Versions
2007	"Sing"	Annie Lennox	Songs of Mass Destruction
2008	"Silence 2008"	Delerium	Closer: The Best of Sarah McLachlan
2009	"Bring on the Wonder"	Susan Enan	Plainsong
2012	"Walkin' Good"	Heart	Fanatic
2013	"Never Leave Your Heart Alone"	Butterfly Boucher	Happy Birthday Flutterby

== Other contributions ==
- 1992: Island of Circles (Donovan tribute album) - "Wear Your Love Like Heaven"
- 1993: Live X - One Life - "Good Enough"
- 1996: Due South: The Original Television Soundtrack - "Possession" - (piano version)
- 1996: A Testimonial Dinner - "Dear God"
- 1998: MTV Fantastic Females - '"Adia"
- 1999: MTV Fantastic Females 2 - "I Will Remember You (Live)"
- 1999: Toy Story 2 - "When She Loved Me" (nominated for Best Original Song, 1999 Academy Awards)
- 2002: Being Out Rocks - "Angel"
- 2006: Charlotte's Web Soundtrack - "Ordinary Miracle"
- 2007: Stockings By the Fire - "I Heard the Bells on Christmas Day"
- 2008: Northern Songs: Canada's Best and Brightest - "Angel"
- 2013: King Kong - "What's It Gonna Take"

== Video releases ==
- 1994: Fumbling Towards Ecstasy: Live VHS
- 1995: Sarah McLachlan Video Compilation: 1989-1994
- 1998: Sarah McLachlan Video Compilation 1989-1998: DVD
- 1999: Mirrorball DVD/VHS
- 2004: Fallen/Stupid DVD
- 2004: Afterglow Live DVD
- 2004: VH1 Storytellers DVD
- 2005: Fumbling Towards Ecstasy Live DVD
- 2005: Sarah McLachlan: A Life of Music DVD
