= The Essential Sarah McLachlan =

Compilation album by Sarah McLachlan
- Released: 20 August 2013
- Recorded: 1988 – 2010
- Genre: Pop
- Label: Legacy
- Producer: Glen Ballard; Rick Chertoff; Delerium; Cyndi Lauper; Pierre Marchand; Sarah McLachlan; Randy Newman; Pleasure Palace; Chris Potter; Greg Reely; David A. Stewart; Ian Stewart; Gary Stokes; William Wittman

Sarah McLachlan chronology
Laws of Illusion (2010)	The Essential Sarah McLachlan (2013)	Shine On (2014)

The Essential Sarah McLachlan is a compilation album by Canadian singer-songwriter Sarah McLachlan, released on 20 August 2013 by Legacy Recordings. It includes thirty-six songs, covering McLachlan's career from her debut album Touch (1988) through to 2010's Laws of Illusion. The Essential Sarah McLachlan features the global hits like "Adia" and "Angel", and also tracks recorded especially for soundtracks, as well as covers.

== The content ==
The Essential Sarah McLachlan includes songs from McLachlan's previous albums but also rare tracks recorded over the years. It features songs from Touch (1988) ("Vox", "Steaming", "Ben's Song"), Solace (1991) ("The Path of Thorns (Terms)", "Into the Fire"), Live (1992) ("Drawn to the Rhythm", "Back Door Man"), Fumbling Towards Ecstasy (1993) ("Possession", "Good Enough", "Elsewhere", "Fear"), The Freedom Sessions (1994) ("Ice Cream", "Hold On"), Surfacing (1997) ("Building a Mystery", "Sweet Surrender", "Adia", "Angel"), Afterglow (2003) ("Fallen", "Stupid", "World on Fire"), Afterglow Live (2004) ("Push", "Witness"), Wintersong (2006) ("River"), Closer: The Best of Sarah McLachlan (2008) ("Don't Give Up on Us", "U Want Me 2"), Laws of Illusion (2010) ("Loving You Is Easy", "Forgiveness", "Illusions of Bliss").

The Essential Sarah McLachlan also contains rare tracks: "Dear God" (from the 1995 tribute album A Testimonial Dinner: The Songs of XTC), "I Will Remember You" (from the 1995 Brothers McMullen soundtrack), "Silence" (from Delerium's 1997 album Karma), "When She Loved Me" (from the 1999 Toy Story 2 soundtrack), "Blackbird" (from the 2001 I Am Sam soundtrack), "The Rainbow Connection" (from the 2002 charity album For the Kids), "Time After Time" (duet with Cyndi Lauper from Lauper's 2005 album The Body Acoustic), "Ordinary Miracle" (from the 2006 Charlotte's Web soundtrack). "Dear God" and "I Will Remember You" were later included on McLachlan's 1996 compilation Rarities, B-Sides and Other Stuff. The remix of "Silence" was later featured on McLachlan's 2001 compilation Remixed. "When She Loved Me", "Blackbird", "The Rainbow Connection", "Time After Time" and "Ordinary Miracle" were later included on McLachlan's 2008 compilation Rarities, B-Sides and Other Stuff Volume 2.

== Track listing ==
Disc one
No.	Title	Writer(s)	Producer(s)	Length
1.	"Vox"	Sarah McLachlan	Greg Reely	4:51
2.	"Steaming"	McLachlan; Darren Phillips	Reely	4:42
3.	"Ben's Song"	McLachlan	Reely	4:53
4.	"The Path of Thorns (Terms)"	McLachlan	Pierre Marchand	5:49
5.	"Into the Fire"	McLachlan; Marchand	Marchand	3:29
6.	"Drawn to the Rhythm" (live)	McLachlan	Gary Stokes; McLachlan	5:15
7.	"Back Door Man" (live)	McLachlan	Stokes; McLachlan	5:02
8.	"Possession"	McLachlan	Marchand	4:38
9.	"Good Enough"	McLachlan	Marchand	5:04
10.	"Elsewhere"	McLachlan	Marchand	4:44
11.	"Fear"	McLachlan	Marchand	3:59
12.	"Ice Cream" (Freedom Sessions)	McLachlan	Pleasure Palace	2:35
13.	"Hold On" (Freedom Sessions)	McLachlan	Marchand	6:43
14.	"Dear God"	Andy Partridge	Marchand	3:54
15.	"I Will Remember You" (Studio Version)	McLachlan; Séamus Egan; Dave Merenda	Marchand	4:51
16.	"Building a Mystery"	McLachlan; Marchand	Marchand	4:07
17.	"Sweet Surrender"	McLachlan	Marchand	4:02

Disc two
No.	Title	Writer(s)	Producer(s)	Length
1.	"Adia"	McLachlan; Marchand	Marchand	4:04
2.	"Angel"	McLachlan	Marchand	4:29
3.	"Silence" (Radio Edit) (Delerium feat. Sarah McLachlan)	Bill Leeb; Rhys Fulber; McLachlan	Delerium; Reely	4:05
4.	"When She Loved Me"	Randy Newman	Newman; McLachlan	3:03
5.	"Blackbird"	John Lennon; Paul McCartney	Marchand	2:19
6.	"The Rainbow Connection"	Paul Williams; Kenneth Ascher	Marchand; Chris Potter	3:30
7.	"Fallen"	McLachlan	Marchand	3:46
8.	"Stupid"	McLachlan	Marchand	3:23
9.	"World on Fire"	McLachlan; Marchand	Marchand	4:21
10.	"Push" (live)	McLachlan	Potter; Ian Stewart	3:45
11.	"Witness" (live)	McLachlan; Marchand	Potter; Ian Stewart	5:25
12.	"Time After Time" (Cyndi Lauper with Sarah McLachlan)	Cyndi Lauper; Rob Hyman	Rick Chertoff; Lauper; William Wittman	4:16
13.	"River"	Joni Mitchell	Marchand	4:01
14.	"Ordinary Miracle"	Glen Ballard; David A. Stewart	Ballard; Stewart	3:02
15.	"Don't Give Up on Us"	McLachlan; Marchand	Marchand	3:36
16.	"U Want Me 2"	McLachlan; Marchand	Marchand	4:06
17.	"Loving You Is Easy"	McLachlan	Marchand	3:02
18.	"Forgiveness"	McLachlan; Marchand	Marchand	3:48
19.	"Illusions of Bliss"	McLachlan; Marchand	Marchand	3:53

== Release history ==
Region	Date	Label	Format	Catalog
United States	20 August 2013	Legacy	2CD	88883750772
United Kingdom	16 September 2013	Legacy	2CD	88883772432
