= List of awards and nominations received by Sarah McLachlan =

Sarah McLachlan awards and nominations
Awards and nominations
Award	Wins	Nominations
Billboard	1	1
Grammy	3	13
Juno	10	26
MTV VMA	0	1
Much	3	6
Western Canadian Music Awards	2	4

Totals (Note: Certain award groups do not simply award one winner. They acknowledge several different recipients, have runners-up, and have third place. Since this is a specific recognition and is different from losing an award, runner-up mentions are considered wins in this award tally. For simplification and to avoid errors, each award in this list has been presumed to have had a prior nomination.)
- Wins: 26
- Nominations: 67

Sarah McLachlan is a Canadian singer-songwriter known for founding the Lilith Fair women's music festival. She has released ten studio albums, with 1997's Surfacing being her top-selling album, with more than 8 million copies in the U.S. alone, and another thirteen compilation, remix and live albums. Her recordings to 2013 were released through Nettwerk Records and distributed by Arista Records; from 2014, her music has been released by Verve Records and Concord Records. Three of her studio albums reached the No. 1 place in the Canadian Albums Chart and the Top 10 on the Billboard 200. She has sold over 40 million copies worldwide.

== BDS Certified Spin Awards ==
Broadcast Data Systems, also known as Nielsen BDS, BDS or Luminate BDS, is a service that tracks monitored radio, television and internet airplay of songs based on the number of spins and detections.

Year	Nominee / work	Award	Result
2003	"I Will Remember You"	500,000 Spins	Won

== BMI Pop Awards ==
Broadcast Music, Inc. (BMI) is a performing rights organizations that collects license fees on behalf of songwriters, composers, and music publishers and distributes them as royalties.

Year	Nominee / work	Award	Result
1999	Herself	Songwriter of the Year	Won
1999	"Building a Mystery"	Award-Winning Song	Won
1999	"Adia"	Award-Winning Song	Won
1999	"Sweet Surrender"	Award-Winning Song	Won

=== Beatport Music Awards ===
With its nominees based solely on Beatport sales data, The Beatport Music Awards aim to recognize electronic music talent.

Year	Nominee / work	Award	Result
2008	"Silence" (feat. Delerium) (Niels van Gogh vs Thomas Gold Remix)	Best Progressive House Track	Won

== Billboard Music Awards ==
The Billboard Music Awards are an annual awards show sponsored by Billboard magazine awarding the top charting singles and artists.

Year	Nominated work	Award	Result
1999	"Angel"	Hot Adult Contemporary Track	Won
1999	"Angel"	Top Soundtrack Single	Nominated
1999	Herself	Top Pop Artist – Female	Nominated
1999	Herself	Top Adult Contemporary Artist	Nominated
1999	Herself	Top Adult Top 40 Artist	Nominated
2004	Herself	Top Internet Artist	Nominated
2004	Afterglow	Top Internet Album	Nominated

== Critics' Choice Awards ==
The Critics' Choice Award is an awards show presented annually by the Broadcast Film Critics Association to honor the finest in cinematic achievement.

Year	Nominated work	Award	Result
2007	"Ordinary Miracle", Charlotte's Web	Best Song	Nominated

== East Coast Music Awards ==
The East Coast Music Awards were established in 1991 by the East Coast Music Association to develop, advance and celebrate East Coast Canadian music, its artists and its industry professionals throughout the region and around the world.

Year	Nominated work	Award	Result
1989	Touch	Factor Recording Artist of the Year	Nominated
	Touch	Female Recording of the Year	Nominated
	Touch	Video of the Year	Nominated
1990	Touch	Factor Recording Artist of the Year	Nominated
	Touch	Female Recording of the Year	Nominated
	Ben's Song	Song of the Year	Nominated
	Ben's Song	Video of the Year	Nominated
1992	Herself	Entertainer of the Year	Nominated
	Solace	Factor Recording Artist of the Year	Nominated
	Solace	Female Recording of the Year	Won
	Herself	Live Artist of the Year	Nominated
	Solace	Pop/Rock Recording of the Year	Nominated
	Path of Thorns	Song of the Year	Nominated
	Path of Thorns	Video of the Year	Nominated
1993	Herself	Entertainer of the Year	Nominated
	Solace	Female Recording of the Year	Nominated
	Solace	Pop/Rock Recording of the Year	Nominated
	"Into the Fire"	Video of the Year	Nominated
1994	Herself	Entertainer of the Year	Nominated
	Fumbling Towards Ecstasy	Factor Recording Artist of the Year	Nominated
	Fumbling Towards Ecstasy	Female Recording of the Year	Won
	Herself	Live Artist of the Year	Nominated
	Fumbling Towards Ecstasy	Pop/Rock Recording of the Year	Won
	Possession	Video of the Year	Nominated
1998	Surfacing	Factor Recording of the Year	Nominated
	Surfacing	Female Recording of the Year	Won
	Surfacing	Pop/Rock Recording of the Year	Nominated
	Building a Mystery	Song of the Year	Nominated
	Building a Mystery	Songwriter of the Year	Won
	Building a Mystery	Video of the Year	Won

== Grammy Awards ==
The Grammy Awards were established in 1958 by the National Academy of Recording Arts and Sciences of the United States awarding the best in the music industry.

Year	Nominated work	Award	Result
1995	Fumbling Towards Ecstasy	Best Alternative Music Album	Nominated
1998	Surfacing	Best Pop Album	Nominated
1998	"Last Dance"	Best Pop Instrumental Performance	Won
1998	"Building A Mystery"	Best Female Pop Vocal Performance	Won
1999	"Adia"	Best Female Pop Vocal Performance	Nominated
2000	"I Will Remember You (Live)"	Best Female Pop Vocal Performance	Won
2000	Mirrorball	Best Pop Album	Nominated
2000	"Possession (Live)"	Best Female Rock Vocal Performance	Nominated
2001	"The Difficult Kind" (w Sheryl Crow)	Best Pop Collaboration with Vocals	Nominated
2004	"Fallen"	Best Female Pop Vocal Performance	Nominated
2005	Afterglow	Best Pop Vocal Album	Nominated
2006	"World On Fire"	Best Short Form Video	Nominated
2007	Wintersong	Best Traditional Pop Vocal Album	Nominated
2018	Wonderland	Best Traditional Pop Vocal Album	Nominated
2027	Better Broken	Best Traditional Pop Vocal Album	Pending

== Helpmann Awards ==
The Helpmann Awards recognise distinguished artistic achievement and excellence in Australia's live performing arts sectors.

Year	Nominee / work	Award	Result
2004	Afterglow 2004	Best Contemporary Concert Presentation Theatre	Nominated

== International Dance Music Awards ==
The Winter Music Conference was an annual awards ceremony held in Miami Beach, Florida, as part of the Winter Music Conference.

Year	Nominated work	Award	Result	Ref
2004	"World On Fire"	Best Progressive House/Trance	Nominated	

== Juno Awards ==
The Juno Awards, the equivalent of the Canadian Grammy Awards, are awarded annually to Canadian musicians by the Canadian Academy of Recording Arts and Sciences.

Year	Nominated work	Award	Result
1992	Herself	Female Vocalist of the Year	Nominated
1992	"Into the Fire"	Best Music Video	Won
1994	Herself	Female Vocalist of the Year	Nominated
1994	Herself	Songwriter of the Year	Nominated
1995	Herself	Entertainer of the Year	Nominated
1995	Fumbling Towards Ecstasy	Album of the Year	Nominated
1998	Surfacing	Album of the Year	Won
1998	"Building A Mystery"	Single of the Year	Won
1998	Herself	Songwriter of the Year	Won
1998	Herself	Female Vocalist of the Year	Won
1999	"Adia"	Single of the Year	Nominated
1999	"Sweet Surrender"	Best Music Video	Nominated
2000	Herself	International Achievement Award	Won
2004	Herself	Artist of the Year	Nominated
2004	Herself	Songwriter of the Year	Won
2004	Herself	Juno Fan Choice Award	Nominated
2004	Afterglow	Album of the Year	Nominated
2004	Afterglow	Pop Album of the Year	Won
2005	Herself	Juno Fan Choice Award	Nominated
2007	Herself	Juno Fan Choice Award	Nominated
2007	Wintersong	Pop Album of the Year	Nominated
2009	Herself	Humanitarian of the Year	Won
2011	Herself	Artist of the Year	Nominated
2011	Herself	Songwriter of the Year	Nominated
2011	Laws of Illusion	Pop Album of the Year	Nominated
2015	Herself	Artist of the Year	Nominated
2015	Shine On	Adult Contemporary Album of the Year	Won
2017	Wonderland	Adult Contemporary Album of the Year	Won
2026	Better Broken	Adult Contemporary Album of the Year	Won

== MTV Video Music Awards ==
The MTV Video Music Awards were established by MTV in 1984 to award the top videos of the year.

Year	Nominated work	Award	Result
2005	"World On Fire"	Breakthrough Video	Nominated

== Music Video Production Awards ==
The MVPA Awards are annually presented by a Los Angeles-based music trade organization to honor the year's best music videos.

Year	Nominee / work	Award	Result
2005	"World on Fire"	Cross Promotion	Nominated

== MuchMusic Video Awards ==
The MuchMusic Video Awards are annual awards presented by the Canadian music video channel MuchMusic to honour the year's best music videos.

Year	Nominated work	Award	Result
1994	"Possession"	Favourite Female Video	Nominated
1994	"Possession"	Favourite Adult Contemporary Video	Won
1997	"Building A Mystery"	People's Choice: Favourite Canadian Video	Won
1999	"Angel"	People's Choice: Favourite Canadian Video	Nominated
2004	"Fallen"	MuchMoreMusic Award	Won
2005	"World On Fire"	MuchMoreMusic Award	Nominated

== Slaight Polaris Heritage Prize ==
The Slaight Family Polaris Heritage Prize celebrates classic Canadian albums released before the Polaris Prize was instituted in 2006.

Year	Nominee / work	Award	Result
2016	Fumbling Towards Ecstasy	Heritage Award	Nominated
2017	Fumbling Towards Ecstasy	Heritage Award	Nominated
2018	Fumbling Towards Ecstasy	Heritage Award	Nominated
2019	Fumbling Towards Ecstasy	Heritage Award	Nominated

== Western Canadian Music Awards ==
The Western Canadian Music Awards, also known as BreakOut West, were established in 2003 by the Western Canada Music Alliance to honor the best of music in Western Canada.

Year	Nominated work	Award	Result
2004	Herself	Entertainer of the Year	Nominated
2004	Herself	Songwriter of the Year	Nominated
2004	Afterglow	Outstanding Pop Recording	Nominated
2005	Afterglow Live	Outstanding Pop Recording	Won
2010	Herself	International Achievement Award	Won

== Other recognition ==
- 1999 – McLachlan ranked No. 69 on VH1's 100 Greatest Women of Rock & Roll.
- 1999 – McLachlan was appointed as an Officer of the Order of Canada (OC).
- 2001 – McLachlan was appointed as a Member of the Order of British Columbia (OBC)
- 2002 – Queen Elizabeth II Golden Jubilee Medal (Canadian Version).
- 2007 – McLachlan's song "Building A Mystery" ranked No. 91 on the VH1's 100 Greatest Songs of the 90's
- 2011 – Canadian Music Week, Allan Slaight Humanitarian Spirit Award
- 2012 – Queen Elizabeth II Diamond Jubilee Medal (Canadian Version).
- 2017 – Canadian Music Hall of Fame, Inducted
