= Live from Etown: 2006 Christmas Special =

2006 studio album by Sarah McLachlan

Live album by Sarah McLachlan
- Released: 19 December 2006

Sarah McLachlan chronology
Wintersong (2006)	Live from Etown: 2006 Christmas Special (2006)	Rarities, B-Sides and Other Stuff Volume 2 (2008)

Live from Etown: 2006 Christmas Special is a holiday album by Canadian singer-songwriter Sarah McLachlan, released in December 2006. It was produced by collaborator Pierre Marchand.

== Track listing ==
1. "Building a Mystery" – 4:21
2. "River" – 4:07
3. "Adia" – 4:19
4. "Wintersong" (Sarah McLachlan) – 3:34
5. "Push" – 3:58
6. "In The Bleak Midwinter" – 3:56
7. "Angel" – 5:52
8. "Happy Christmas" (Performing with Leigh Nash, Nick Forster, and Helen Forster) – 3:52
