= The Classic Christmas Album (Sarah McLachlan album) =

Compilation album by Sarah McLachlan
- Released: 2 October 2015
- Recorded: 1996 – 2015
- Genre: Christmas
- Labels: Arista; Legacy
- Producers: Pierre Marchand; Sarah McLachlan; Chris Potter; Stephen Fisk

Sarah McLachlan chronology
The Box Set Series (2015)	The Classic Christmas Album (2015)	Wonderland (2016)

The Classic Christmas Album is a Christmas compilation album by Canadian singer-songwriter Sarah McLachlan, released on 2 October 2015 by Legacy Recordings. It includes all the songs from 2006's Wintersong plus five other Christmas tunes.

== Content ==
The album includes all twelve tracks from McLachlan's 2006 Christmas album, Wintersong and five other Christmas songs. "God Rest You Merry, Gentlemen / We Three Kings" was recorded backstage by Barenaked Ladies and McLachlan using one mic and done in one take at Planetfest in December 1996 for US radio station WPLT. In 2000, it appeared on the Nettwerk's compilation, Christmas Songs and in 2004, it was featured on the Barenaked Ladies album, Barenaked for the Holidays. In 2015, "God Rest You Merry, Gentlemen / We Three Kings" was included for the very first time on McLachlan's album. The Classic Christmas Album also includes "I Heard the Bells on Christmas Day" from the 2007 compilation, Stockings by the Fire. Three other songs, "Space on the Couch for Two", "Find Your Voice" and "Prayer of Saint Francis", feature The Sarah McLachlan School Choir and they were already released as free downloads in 2011, 2012 and 2013, respectively. "Prayer of Saint Francis" without The Sarah McLachlan School Choir was featured on the Surfacing album bonus disc and later on Rarities, B-Sides and Other Stuff Volume 2.

== Reception ==
The album sold 1,000 copies in the United States in its first week. It entered the Billboard 200 at No. 199 for chart dated 26 December 2015. It has sold 20,000 copies in the United States as of September 2016.

== Track listing ==
No.	Title	Writer(s)	Producer(s)	Length
1.	"Wintersong"	Sarah McLachlan	Pierre Marchand	3:29
2.	"Have Yourself a Merry Little Christmas"	Hugh Martin; Ralph Blane	Marchand	3:43
3.	"What Child Is This? (Greensleeves)"	Traditional	Marchand	3:29
4.	"I'll Be Home for Christmas"	Walter Kent; Kim Gannon; Buck Ram	Marchand	3:12
5.	"God Rest You Merry, Gentlemen / We Three Kings" (with Barenaked Ladies)	Traditional	Barenaked Ladies	3:26
6.	"Happy Xmas (War Is Over)"	John Lennon; Yoko Ono	Marchand	3:27
7.	"Prayer of Saint Francis" (featuring The Sarah McLachlan School Choir)	Traditional	Marchand; McLachlan	1:58
8.	"I Heard the Bells on Christmas Day"	Henry Wadsworth Longfellow; John Baptiste Calkin	Marchand	3:37
9.	"Space on the Couch for Two" (featuring The Sarah McLachlan School Choir)	The Sarah McLachlan School Choir	McLachlan; Stephen Fisk; Chris Potter	4:16
10.	"Find Your Voice" (featuring The Sarah McLachlan School Choir)	McLachlan; Marchand	Marchand; McLachlan	3:16
11.	"River"	Joni Mitchell	Marchand	4:02
12.	"Silent Night"	Traditional	Marchand	3:47
13.	"O Little Town of Bethlehem"	Traditional	Marchand	3:49
14.	"The First Noel / Mary Mary"	Traditional	Marchand	4:59
15.	"Song for a Winter's Night"	Gordon Lightfoot	Marchand	3:46
16.	"In the Bleak Midwinter"	Christina Rossetti	Marchand	3:44
17.	"Christmas Time Is Here" (featuring Diana Krall)	Vince Guaraldi; Lee Mendelson	Marchand	4:00

== Charts ==
Chart (2015)	Peak position
US Billboard 200	199

== Release history ==
Region	Date	Label	Format	Catalog
United States	2 October 2015	Legacy	CD	88843086482

== See also ==
- Wintersong
- Wonderland
