= Closer: The Best of Sarah McLachlan =

Greatest hits album by Sarah McLachlan
- Released: 7 October 2008
- Recorded: 1988–2008
- Genre: Pop
- Length: 67:43
- Label: Nettwerk (Canada); Arista (US)
- Producer: Pierre Marchand; Greg Reely

Sarah McLachlan chronology
Rarities, B-Sides and Other Stuff Volume 2 (2008)	Closer: The Best of Sarah McLachlan (2008)	Laws of Illusion (2010)

Singles from Closer: The Best of Sarah McLachlan
- 1. "U Want Me 2" Released: 8 August 2008

Professional ratings
Review scores
Source	Rating
Allmusic	3/5 stars
Blender	3.5/5 stars

Closer: The Best of Sarah McLachlan is a greatest hits album by Canadian singer-songwriter Sarah McLachlan, and also contains two new tracks. It was released on 7 October 2008. The album was released in Germany on 17 October. The release date for Closer was pushed back to 11 May 2009 in the United Kingdom.

== Track listing ==
1. "Vox" – 4:53
2. "The Path of Thorns (Terms)" – 5:51
3. "Into the Fire" – 3:31
4. "Possession" – 4:38
5. "Hold On" – 4:10
6. "Good Enough" – 5:03
7. "Building a Mystery" – 4:08
8. "Sweet Surrender" – 4:02
9. "Adia" – 4:05
10. "Angel" – 4:30
11. "I Will Remember You" (Live) – 3:34
12. "Fallen" – 3:48
13. "Stupid" – 3:23
14. "World on Fire" – 4:23
15. "Don't Give Up on Us" – 3:37
16. "U Want Me 2" – 4:07

=== Deluxe edition ===
Disc One

1. "Vox" – 4:53
2. "Steaming" – 4:44
3. "Ben's Song" – 4:55
4. "The Path of Thorns (Terms)" – 5:51
5. "Into the Fire" – 3:31
6. "Drawn to the Rhythm" – 4:09
7. "Mercy" – 4:22
8. "Possession" – 4:38
9. "Hold On" – 4:10
10. "Good Enough" – 5:03
11. "Ice Cream" – 2:44
12. "Fumbling Towards Ecstasy" – 4:50

Disc Two

1. "Building a Mystery" – 4:08
2. "Sweet Surrender" – 4:02
3. "Adia" – 4:05
4. "Angel" – 4:30
5. "I Will Remember You" (Live) – 3:34
6. "Fallen" – 3:48
7. "Stupid" – 3:23
8. "World on Fire" – 4:23
9. "Push" (Live) – 3:47
10. "Don't Give Up on Us" – 3:37
11. "U Want Me 2" – 4:07
12. "Hold On" (Radio Remix) – 4:09
13. "I Will Remember You" (Original Version) – 4:52
14. "World on Fire" (Radio Remix) – 4:30
15. "U Want Me 2" (Radio Remix) – 4:09
16. "Silence" (Niels Van Gogh vs. Thomas Gold Remix Radio Edit) – 3:30
  - UK Bonus track – Delerium & Sarah McLachlan .

== Charts ==
Chart (2008)	Peak position
Australian Albums (ARIA)	62
Canadian Albums (Billboard)	3
New Zealand Albums (RMNZ)	9
Norwegian Albums (VG-lista)	19
US Billboard 200	11
Chart (2009)	Peak position
Irish Albums (IRMA)	47
Chart (2013)	Peak position
UK Albums (OCC)	192

== Certifications and sales ==
Region	Certification	Certified units/sales
Canada (Music Canada)	Platinum	80,000^{^}
United Kingdom (BPI)	Silver	60,000^{‡}
^{^} Shipments figures based on certification alone.^{‡} Sales+streaming figures based on certification alone.

== Release history ==
Country	Date
Australia	4 October 2008
United States	7 October 2008
New Zealand	7 October 2008
United Kingdom	11 May 2009
