= Laws of Illusion =

Studio album by Sarah McLachlan
- Released: 15 June 2010
- Recorded: 2008–2010
- Genres: Pop, pop rock
- Length: 49:14
- Labels: Nettwerk (Canada); Arista (US)
- Producer: Pierre Marchand

Sarah McLachlan chronology
Closer: The Best of Sarah McLachlan (2008)	Laws of Illusion (2010)	The Essential (2013)

Singles from Laws of Illusion
- 1. "Loving You is Easy" Released: 23 April 2010; 2. "Forgiveness" Released: 7 September 2010; 3. "Illusions of Bliss" Released: 4 February 2011

Laws of Illusion is the seventh studio album by Canadian singer-songwriter Sarah McLachlan. It was released on 11 June 2010 on Arista Records in the United States and 15 June 2010 on Nettwerk in Canada. Recording for the album took place in Montreal and Vancouver, and production was handled by Pierre Marchand, with whom McLachlan has frequently collaborated in the past.

According to McLachlan, her original idea for the album's title was Loss and Illusion. When she suggested it to Marchand, he misunderstood her as saying Laws of Illusion. She chose to use that as the final title instead.

== Release ==
Customers who pre-ordered the album through sarahmclachlan.com were given "exclusive pre-access" to tickets to the 2010 Lilith Fair along with an instant download of McLachlan's song "One Dream", which she wrote for the Vancouver Winter Olympics.

== Singles ==
"Loving You Is Easy" was released on 23 April 2010. McLachlan's official website announced the track listing on 14 May 2010. "Loving You Is Easy" debuted at number 28 on the Billboard Adult Contemporary Songs on the week of 29 May 2010 and has risen to number 14 as of 17 July 2010. The song also debuted at number 38 on the Billboard Adult Top 40 on the week of 26 June 2010. "Loving You Is Easy" debuted at number 86 on the Billboard Canadian Hot 100 on the week of 12 June 2010. It has so far peaked at number 59.

== Chart performance ==
Laws of Illusion debuted at number 2 on the Canadian album charts, selling 22,000 copies in its first week of release. The album debuted at #3 on the Billboard 200, selling 94,000 copies in its first week of release and selling an additional 38,000 copies in its second week. The album has been less successful in the UK, debuting at #76. In Australia, the album debuted at #12, making it her highest-charting album there.

== Critical reception ==
Professional ratings
Aggregate scores
Source	Rating
Metacritic	63/100
Review scores
Source	Rating
AllMusic	3/5 stars
Rolling Stone	2/5 stars
SputnikMusic	4/5 stars
Slant	2/5 stars
Entertainment Weekly	4/5 stars
Los Angeles Times	2.5/4 stars
Boston Globe	4/5 stars
New York Times	4/5 stars

Laws of Illusion received generally favorable reviews from music critics. Allmusic noted that the album "furthers the fantasy by taking its cues from dated Clinton-era folk-pop. It’s an album that aims to soothe rather than startle, replete with wistful, lovelorn lyrics and McLachlan’s signature arrangements — a mix of new age atmospherics and singer/songwriter ambience — courtesy of longtime record producer Pierre Marchand." Rolling Stone gave the album a negative review, stating that "Sarah McLachlan's first disc since splitting from her husband, Ashwin Sood, feels scattered: The carefree single 'Loving You Is Easy' feels out of place. The rest alternates between vulnerability and bitterness, using the same sighs and moans with which she used to convey ecstasy." SputnikMusic gave the album 4 stars and praised McLachlan's musical return to the style she explored in her earlier albums, such as Surfacing, Touch and Solace. Slant gave the album rather negative review noting that "Laws of Illusion sounds both effortless and effort-less."

== Track listing ==
No.	Title	Writer(s)	Length
1.	"Awakenings"	Sarah McLachlan	4:08
2.	"Illusions of Bliss"	McLachlan, Pierre Marchand	3:53
3.	"Loving You Is Easy"	McLachlan	3:03
4.	"Changes"	McLachlan, Marchand	3:44
5.	"Forgiveness"	McLachlan, Marchand	3:49
6.	"Rivers of Love"	McLachlan, Marchand	3:54
7.	"Love Come"	McLachlan	3:33
8.	"Out of Tune"	McLachlan, Marchand	3:51
9.	"Heartbreak"	McLachlan, Marchand	4:07
10.	"Don't Give Up on Us"	McLachlan, Marchand	3:37
11.	"U Want Me 2"	McLachlan, Marchand	4:07
12.	"Bring on the Wonder"	Susan Enan	3:24
13.	"Love Come" (Hidden track; solo piano with strings)	McLachlan	4:04

"·" Tracks that feature piano versions/video on Deluxe Edition

- Japanese Edition Includes 2 Bonus Tracks - "Loving You Is Easy" (Acoustic), "One Dream"

== Personnel ==
Credits for Laws of Illusion adapted from AllMusic.

Musicians

- Sarah McLachlan – guitar (acoustic), piano, composer, glockenspiel, harmonium, vocals, vocals (background), wurlitzer
- Matt Chamberlain – percussion, drums
- Colin Cripps – guitar (acoustic), guitar (electric), vocals (background)
- Yves Desrosiers – guitar (acoustic), guitar (electric), lap steel guitar, slide bass
- Bill Dillon – guitar (acoustic), guitar (electric)
- Luke Doucet – guitar (acoustic), dobro, guitar (electric), vocals (background)
- Robbie Kuster – percussion, drums, vocals (background)
- J.F. Lemieux – bass, vocals (background)
- Catherine Lesaunier – cello
- Maxime St-Pierre – trumpet, flugelhorn
- Pierre Marchand – guitar (acoustic), bass, composer, glockenspiel, harmonium, keyboards, vocals (background), producer, engineer, mixing, tack piano
- Michel Pepin – guitar (acoustic), guitar (electric)

Technical personnel

- Chris Potter – engineer
- Kharen Hill – photography, cover photo, tray photo
- Raphael Mazzucco – photography
- John Rummen – design
- Pascal Shefteshy – engineer, mixing assistant
- Adam Ayan – mastering
- Fred Bouchard – Pro Tools
- Kharen Hill – photography for album artwork and publicity

== Charts ==
=== Weekly charts ===
Chart (2010)	Peak position
Australian Albums (ARIA)	12
Canadian Albums (Billboard)	2
Dutch Albums (Album Top 100)	73
German Albums (Offizielle Top 100)	80
Greek Foreign Albums (IFPI)	6
Irish Albums (IRMA)	100
Japanese Albums (Oricon)	129
New Zealand Albums (RMNZ)	9
Scottish Albums (Official Charts)	85
Swiss Albums (Schweizer Hitparade)	49
UK Albums (Official Charts)	76
US Billboard 200	3
US Top Rock Albums (Billboard)	2

=== Year-end charts ===
Chart (2010)	Position
Canadian Albums (Billboard)	36
US Billboard 200	128
US Top Rock Albums (Billboard)	32

== Release history ==
Date	Type	Label	Catalog #
15 June 2010	CD (Barnes & Noble Exclusive)	Arista	72629
15 June 2010	CD	RCA	55367
15 June 2010	CD/DVD (U.S. Deluxe Edition)	RCA	71991
15 June 2010	LP	RCA	73963
15 June 2010	LP	RCA	8869755367
15 June 2010	CD (Canadian Edition)	Nettwerk	0670030895
15 June 2010	CD/DVD (Canadian Deluxe Edition)	Nettwerk	30903
21 June 2010	CD (U.K.)	Arista	88697553672
21 June 2010	CD/DVD (U.K.)	Arista	88697719912
