= Shine On (Sarah McLachlan album) =

Studio album by Sarah McLachlan
- Released: 6 May 2014
- Genre: Pop rock
- Length: 41:05
- Label: Verve
- Producers: Pierre Marchand, Bob Rock, Vincent Jones

Sarah McLachlan chronology
The Essential (2013)	Shine On (2014)	The Box Set Series (2015)

Singles from Shine On
- 1. "In Your Shoes" Released: 1 April 2014; 2. "Monsters" Released: 17 November 2014

Professional ratings
Aggregate scores
Source	Rating
Metacritic	72/100
Review scores
Source	Rating
Allmusic	4/5 stars
Slant Magazine	2.5/5 stars
Popmatters	6/10 stars
Glide Magazine	6/10 stars

Shine On is the eighth studio album by Canadian singer-songwriter Sarah McLachlan, released on 6 May 2014 by Verve Records. It was recorded in Vancouver and produced by longtime collaborator Pierre Marchand. According to McLachlan, the album was inspired by her father's passing and her own appreciation of life.

Shine On received mostly positive reviews from music critics and became her fourth album to reach number one on the Canadian Albums Chart. It also reached number four on the US Billboard 200.

== Background ==
Three years since her last release, Laws of Illusion, McLachlan began production of the new album with her longtime collaborator/producer, Pierre Marchand. Unlike its predecessor, which dissected the dissolution of her marriage, Shine On eases up on the heartbreak and lets McLachlan show an earthier side. “I needed to challenge myself a lot,” she said. “I needed to step outside my comfort zone. For that reason, I made an effort to write with people I hadn't written with before and to try different producers, like Bob Rock, to take some of the songs in a different direction."

In addition to experiment new sounds, McLachlan also changed things on the lyrical front: “I wanted to tell a new story. I was feeling more hopeful, more positive and light and open, and I wanted to mirror that.”

Songs such as "Surrender and Certainty" and "Song for My Father" were inspired on McLachlan's father dying in December 2010.

== Track listing ==
No.	Title	Writer(s)	Length
1.	"In Your Shoes"	Sarah McLachlan, Luke Doucet, Pierre Marchand	3:53
2.	"Flesh and Blood"	McLachlan, Blair Dally, Hillary Lindsay	4:19
3.	"Monsters"	McLachlan, Marchand	3:13
4.	"Broken Heart"	McLachlan, Marchand	3:18
5.	"Surrender and Certainty"	McLachlan	4:47
6.	"Song for My Father"	McLachlan, Tom Douglas, Matt Morris	3:17
7.	"Turn the Lights Down Low"	McLachlan, Don Felder	3:56
8.	"Love Beside Me"	McLachlan, Douglas, Morris	4:37
9.	"Brink of Destruction"	McLachlan, Marchand	3:58
10.	"Beautiful Girl"	McLachlan, Doucet	3:34
11.	"The Sound that Love Makes"	Doucet	2:17

Target exclusive/iTunes Deluxe edition
No.	Title	Writer(s)	Length
12.	"What's It Gonna Take"	McLachlan	3:02
13.	"Little B"	McLachlan, Frank Giustra	2:45

== Charts ==
=== Weekly charts ===
Chart (2014)	Peak position
Australian Albums (ARIA)	26
Canadian Albums (Billboard)	1
Dutch Albums (Album Top 100)	97
Scottish Albums (Official Charts)	84
UK Albums (Official Charts)	71
US Billboard 200	4

=== Year-end charts ===
Chart (2014)	Position
Canadian Artists Albums (Nielsen SoundScan)	8
US Billboard 200	156

== Certifications and sales ==
Region	Certification	Certified units/sales
Canada (Music Canada)	Gold	45,000

== Credits ==
- Kharen Hill - photography for album artwork and publicity
