= U Want Me 2 =

Single by Sarah McLachlan

from the album Closer: The Best of Sarah McLachlan and Laws of Illusion
- Released: 8 August 2008
- Genre: Pop
- Length: 4:07
- Label: Nettwerk (Canada); Arista (US)
- Songwriters: Sarah McLachlan; Pierre Marchand
- Producer: Pierre Marchand

Sarah McLachlan singles chronology
"World on Fire" (2004)	"U Want Me 2" (2008)	"Don't Give Up On Us" (2009)

"U Want Me 2" is a song by Sarah McLachlan and the lead original single from her 2008 greatest hits album, Closer: The Best of Sarah McLachlan. It is also included on her 2010 album Laws of Illusion. The song was produced by her longtime collaborator, Pierre Marchand.

"U Want Me 2" was included in the Les Mills International BodyBalance (BodyFlow in the US/Canada) fitness program as Track 5 - Hip Openers for Release 47.

Nettwerk first released an alternate version of "U Want Me 2" for digital download. It starts with a Hi-Hat and has a slightly different Instrumentation.

1. "U Want Me 2" (Alternate Version a.k.a. Canadian Version) 3:59
2. "U Want Me 2" (Album Version) 4:07
3. "U Want Me 2" (Radio Mix) 4:09

== Charts ==
Chart (2008)	Peak position
Australian ARIA Singles Chart	96
Canadian Hot 100 (Billboard)	11
Japan Hot 100 Singles	76
US Adult Contemporary (Billboard)	18
US Adult Top 40 (Billboard)	34
US Bubbling Under Hot 100 Singles (Billboard)	5
US Triple A (Billboard)	6
