= Ilembe =

Studio album by Ladysmith Black Mambazo
- Released: 26 February 2007
- Recorded: 2006
- Genre: Isicathamiya
- Length: 54:30
- Label: Gallo Record Company
- Producer: Joseph Shabalala

Ladysmith Black Mambazo chronology
| Long Walk to Freedom (South African release) (2006) | Ilembe (2007) | Ilembe: Honoring Shaka Zulu (2008) |

Ilembe: Honoring Shaka Zulu

Studio album by Ladysmith Black Mambazo
- Released: 22 January 2008
- Recorded: 2006
- Genre: Isicathamiya
- Length: 54:30
- Label: Heads Up International
- Producer: Joseph Shabalala

Ladysmith Black Mambazo chronology
| Ilembe (2007) | Ilembe: Honoring Shaka Zulu (2008) | My Dream - African Sounds (2008) |

Professional ratings
Review scores
| Source | Rating |
|---|---|
| AllMusic | 3/5 stars |

Ilembe is a 2007 album by the South African isicathamiya group Ladysmith Black Mambazo. It was released on 26 February 2007 and did not feature collaborations, and was simply "Ladysmith Black Mambazo at its best", as the Gallo press release for the anticipated release put it. It was re-released in 2008 with the title Ilembe: Honoring Shaka Zulu.

== Album's theme ==
Songs on the album are primarily moral, but there are some religious compositions for which the group are well known. The title track, "Kuyafundw' Osizini" ("Learning From The Obstacles"), spoke of the obstacles faced by people in their lives. As Joseph Shabalala (the group's founder, lead singer, composer and director) put it, "Don’t worry about the many things that are in your way. If you confront those obstacles and learn from them, you will teach others how to conquer the same kinds of obstacles. There are people who complain about everything, and they want to avoid doing things that are too hard, like school or a job. Those people should stay where they are and learn from their experiences."

The album was released in South Africa on the group's label Gallo (#CDGMP 40976), and was issued in the United Kingdom on the Warner Jazz label on 16 April 2007. The album was released in the United States on 22 January 2008, under the title Ilembe: Honoring Shaka Zulu.

== Awards ==
Ilembe has been a very successful album for Ladysmith Black Mambazo: in South Africa, the recording won a South African Music Award (SAMA) on 3 May 2008 in the category Best Traditional A Capella Album; and in the United States, it won a Grammy on 8 February 2009 in the category Best Traditional World Music Album in the 2009 Grammy Awards.

== Track listing ==
1. "Ommu Beno Mmu" ("Somebody And Somebody")
2. "Kuyafundw' Osizini" ("Learning From The Obstacles")
3. "Vela Nsizwa" ("Show Yourself, Young Man")
4. "Let's Do It"
5. "Umon' Usuk' Esweni" ("Jealous Eyes")
6. "Sizobalanda" ("We Are Here")
7. "This Is The Way We Do"
8. "Iphel' Emasini" ("A Cockroach in the Milk" - Zulu proverb)
9. "Asekhon' Amatshitshi" ("The Virgins Are Still There")
10. "Hlala Nami" ("Stay With Me")
11. "Prince of Peace"
12. "Iphel' Emasini (Nature Effects)"

== Ilembe: Honoring Shaka Zulu ==
Ilembe: Honoring Shaka Zulu was released on 22 January 2008; the track list is identical to the 2007 release. It was released under a different label, Heads Up International.
