= Drawn to the Rhythm =

Single by Sarah McLachlan

from the album Solace
- B-side: "Gloomy Sunday"
- Released: 7 February 1992
- Genre: Celtic folk
- Length: 4:08
- Label: Nettwerk
- Songwriter: Sarah McLachlan
- Producer: Pierre Marchand

Sarah McLachlan singles chronology
"Into the Fire" (1992)	"Drawn to the Rhythm" (1992)	"I Will Not Forget You" (1992)

"Drawn to the Rhythm" is the third single and opening track from Sarah McLachlan's album Solace. It was released on 7 February 1992, by Nettwerk in Canada. The song reached number one on the RPM Cancon chart.

The single includes two versions of "Drawn to the Rhythm" — live acoustic from MuchMusic and album mix — as well as a live version of "Gloomy Sunday" which was recorded on 18 October 1991, at the Discovery Theatre, Vancouver.

The music video for this song was directed by Sarah McLachlan herself. Unlike her other videos for the album, she didn't appear nude in it.

== Track listing ==
=== CD: Nettwerk / W2-3065 (Canada) ===
1. "Drawn to the Rhythm"
2. "Gloomy Sunday (Live Oct. 18, 1991 Discovery Theatre, Vancouver)"
3. "Drawn to the Rhythm (Live acoustic at Much Music)"
- also released on cassette 4JW-3065

== Charts ==
=== Weekly charts ===
Chart (1992)	Peak position
Canada Top Singles (RPM)	56
Canada Adult Contemporary (RPM)	12
Canada Canadian Content (RPM)	1

=== Year-end charts ===
Chart (1992)	Position
Canada Adult Contemporary (RPM)	80
