= Better Broken =

Studio album by Sarah McLachlan
- Released: 19 September 2025
- Studio: Sound City (Los Angeles); Creekside Studios (Vancouver)
- Length: 45:53
- Label: Concord
- Producer: Tony Berg; Will Maclellan

Sarah McLachlan chronology
Wonderland (2016)	Better Broken (2025)

Professional ratings
Aggregate scores
Source	Rating
Metacritic	77/100
Review scores
Source	Rating
AllMusic	4/5 stars
Slant Magazine	3/5 stars
Uncut	7/10
Under the Radar	8/10 stars

Better Broken is the tenth studio album by the Canadian singer-songwriter Sarah McLachlan. It was released on 19 September 2025 by Concord Records.

== Background and recording ==
Better Broken is McLachlan's first album in nine years, following Wonderland (2016), and her first of original material since Shine On (2014). The album was produced by Tony Berg and Will Maclellan, and recorded primarily at Sound City Studios in Los Angeles. Of the new material, McLachlan said in a press release that the lyricism was inspired by her thoughts of the state of the world, adding that her goal with this album was to "[provide] people with some relief and release — but in the end I just want them to take whatever they need from it, and make the songs part of their own story."

== Promotion ==
The album was preceded by the release of the title track, "Better Broken", simultaneously with the album announcement on 26 June 2025 as well as "Gravity" on 8 August 2025 and "Reminds Me" on 16 September 2025.

McLachlan embarked on a tour in support of the album beginning in November 2025.

On 26 June 2026, an extended edition of the album was released to digital retailers with two additional songs: the previous Target-edition bonus track "All This Disaster" and a cover of Judee Sill's "The Kiss".

== Track listing ==
Better Broken track listing
No.	Title	Writer(s)	Length
1.	"Better Broken"	Sarah McLachlan; Benjamin Bock; Matthew Morris	4:00
2.	"Gravity"	McLachlan; Thomas Doucet	5:00
3.	"The Last to Go"	McLachlan	3:34
4.	"Only Way Out Is Through"	McLachlan; Tony Berg	4:01
5.	"Reminds Me" (featuring Katie Gavin)	McLachlan	3:49
6.	"One in a Long Line"	McLachlan; Anne Preven	3:44
7.	"Only Human"	McLachlan	3:48
8.	"Long Road Home"	McLachlan	4:02
9.	"Rise"	McLachlan; Doucet; Preven	3:38
10.	"Wilderness"	McLachlan	4:38
11.	"If This Is the End..."	McLachlan; Berg	5:35
Total length:			45:53

Target bonus track
No.	Title	Writer(s)	Length
12.	"All This Disaster"	McLachlan; Alex Greenwald	3:22

Extended version bonus tracks
No.	Title	Writer(s)	Length
12.	"All This Disaster"	McLachlan; Greenwald	3:22
13.	"The Kiss"	Judee Sill	4:24

== Personnel ==
Credits adapted from Tidal.

- Sarah McLachlan – vocals (all tracks), piano (tracks 1–4, 6–10), acoustic guitar (8, 11)
- Will Maclellan – production, mixing, engineering (all tracks); programming (1, 6, 9), percussion (3, 4, 6); acoustic guitar, drum programming, electric guitar, ngoni, upright bass (3); vocal programming (7)
- Tony Berg – production (all tracks), electric guitar (6), acoustic guitar (8, 9), percussion (11)
- Pat Sullivan – mastering
- Chris Potter – additional engineering
- Nana Adjoa – engineering assistance (all tracks), bass guitar (3, 11)
- Benny Bock – synthesizer (1–3, 5–8, 11), celesta (1), piano (3, 10), keyboards (4), organ (4, 5), Mellotron (8), accordion (9), banjo (11), choir vocals (11)
- Mason Stoops – guitar (1), electric guitar (3, 6, 7, 11), baritone guitar (4, 8), acoustic guitar (5), choir vocals (11)
- Wendy Melvoin – bass guitar (1, 4, 6), guitar (1), drums (6)
- Abe Rounds – drums (1, 9), percussion (1)
- Vanessa Freebairn-Smith – cello (2, 4, 5, 7, 9, 11), choir vocals (11)
- Sebastian Steinberg – upright bass (2, 8, 10, 11)
- Leah Katz – viola (2)
- Charlie Bisharat – violin (2)
- Daphne Chen – violin (2)
- Kane Ritchotte – drums (3, 8), choir vocals (11)
- CJ Camerieri – horn (3)
- Matt Chamberlain – drums (4, 5, 11), percussion (4, 11)
- Gabe Noel – bass guitar (5, 9)
- Katie Gavin – vocals (5), choir vocals (11)
- Greg Leisz – pedal steel guitar (5)
- India Sood – vocals (6), choir vocals (11)
- Taja Sood – vocals (6), choir vocals (11)
- Dylan Day – electric guitar (9)
- Alex Greenwald – choir vocals (11)
- Anne Preven – choir vocals (11)
- Annie Stela – choir vocals (11)
- Bing Bon Berg – choir vocals (11)
- Briana Lee – choir vocals (11)
- Cary Berg – choir vocals (11)
- Darin Harmon – choir vocals (11)
- Goldie Harmon – choir vocals (11)
- Joe Keefe – choir vocals (11)
- Kelly Hughes – choir vocals (11)
- Kharen Hill – choir vocals (11)
- Marieke Ochtman – choir vocals (11)
- Marlon Sexton – choir vocals (11)
- Nicholas Nistal – choir vocals (11)
- Pinky Turzo – choir vocals (11)
- Rachel Selch – choir vocals (11)
- Serena Reynolds – choir vocals (11)
- Shane Boose – choir vocals (11)
- Thomas Berg – choir vocals (11)
- Z Berg – choir vocals (11)
- Zoey Ochtman – choir vocals (11)

== Charts ==
Chart performance for Better Broken
Chart (2025)	Peak position
Australian Albums (ARIA)	33
Canadian Albums (Billboard)	28
Scottish Albums (OCC)	55
UK Albums Sales (OCC)	41
US Billboard 200	96
US Independent Albums (Billboard)	12
