= Vox (song) =

- 1988 Nettwerk / Capitol Records release

Single by Sarah McLachlan

from the album Touch
- B-side: "Solsbury Hill"; "Touch"; "Into the Fire"
- Released: October 21, 1988
- Genre: Pop
- Length: 4:48
- Label: Nettwerk / Capitol Records (1988); Arista Records (1989)
- Songwriter: Sarah McLachlan
- Producer: Greg Reely

Sarah McLachlan singles chronology
"Vox" (1988)	"Steaming" (1989)

"Vox" is the debut single by Canadian singer-songwriter Sarah McLachlan. It was released in 1988 in Canada from her album Touch; it was released as a CD-single in 1992. The 1989 Arista Records release of Touch contained a different mix of the song from the original 1988 album, and different extended remixes were released as well. "Vox" reached number 90 on Canada's RPM Top Singles chart but failed to chart elsewhere.

"Vox" was also featured on McLachlan's 2005 Bloom: Remix Album as a contemporary dance remix by Tom Middleton.

== Music videos ==
In the Canadian version of the music video, directed by Mark Jowett and Dermot Shane, McLachlan sings "Vox" while falling water and flowers are superimposed over her. At the end she stands on top of a rock and throws flowers into the water. In the black-and-white American version, directed by Michelle Mahrer, McLachlan sings and plays guitar in a long black dress in a desert.

== Track listing ==
7": Arista / ASI-9804 United States

1. "Vox" (Single version) – 4:15
2. "Solsbury Hill" (Live)
- US promo

7": Arista / 112 217 Germany

1. "Vox" (Radio version) – 4:15
2. "Touch" – 3:11

12": Nettwerk / NT12 3023 Canada

1. "Vox" (Extended remix) – 6:49
2. "Vox" (Radio mix) – 4:15
3. "Vox" (Dub mix) – 7:19
- With black picture sleeve
- 1988 release

12": Nettwerk / W1-3023 Canada

1. "Vox" (Extended Dance remix)
2. "Vox" (Radio mix) – 4:15
3. "Vox" (Instrumental)
- 1989 release

12": Arista / ADP-9805 United States

1. "Vox" (Extended Version) – 6:49
2. "Vox" (Radio Version) – 4:15
3. "Vox" (Album Version) – 4:48
4. "Vox" (Dub Version) – 7:19
- US promo

CD: Nettwerk / W2-3070 Canada

1. "Vox" (Extended mix) – 6:59
2. "Vox" (Instrumental Dub Mix) – 5:43
3. "Into the Fire" (Extended remix) – 6:00
- released in 1992

== Charts ==
=== Weekly charts ===
Chart (1989)	Peak position
Canada Top Singles (RPM)	90
Italy Airplay (Music & Media)	12
