= Susan Enan =

British singer

- Born: Peterborough, Cambridgeshire, England
- Origin: Belfast
- Genre: Acoustic
- Occupations: Singer, songwriter
- Instrument: Guitar
- Years active: 2006–present
- Label: Unsigned
- Website: www.susanenan.com

Susan Enan is an English singer and songwriter.

Susan Enan is known for writing and performing the 2009 song "Bring on the Wonder" which was featured in the television show Bones. The song featured Sarah McLachlan on backing vocals, and was subsequently featured on both Enan's (Plainsong) and McLachlan's (Laws of Illusion) albums.

Enan's debut album, Plainsong, was released independently in 2009. Paste Magazine included the album on its list of "Eight Criminally Underrated Albums From 2009", while Amie Street named it one of the top 50 albums of the year.

== Biography ==
Susan Enan was born in Peterborough, Cambridgeshire, England. She went to university in Liverpool and studied for a music degree. After university, she moved to Belfast in Northern Ireland. She moved to New York City in 2005, and Nashville, Tennessee, in 2012.

In February 2010, after Susan gave a concert in a fan's house in Nashville, she began to get requests from all over the world for more house concerts. And so began the worldwide house concert tour.

Enan cites Woody Guthrie and Bob Dylan as influential to her.

== Discography ==
- 1998: Inside (EP)
- 2000: #one (EP)
- 2002: Moonlight (EP)
- 2009: Plainsong
