= Long Walk to Freedom (album) =

Studio album by Ladysmith Black Mambazo
- Released: 24 January 2006
- Recorded: July and August 2005
- Genre: Isicathamiya
- Length: 55:09
- Label: Headsup International
- Producer: Joseph Shabalala

Ladysmith Black Mambazo chronology
No Boundaries (2005)	Long Walk to Freedom (2006)	Ilembe (2007)

Professional ratings
Review scores
Source	Rating
AllMusic	3.5/5 stars

Long Walk to Freedom is a 2006 album by the South African isicathamiya group Ladysmith Black Mambazo.

== Background ==
It was released on 24 January 2006 and featured collaborations with artists including Emmylou Harris, Sarah McLachlan, Melissa Etheridge, Joe McBride, Taj Mahal, Hugh Masekela, Zap Mama and many more.

The album was released in an enhanced CD version (HUCD 3019, or #CDGMP 40952 in South Africa) and on Hybrid SACD (HUSA 9019) and has been (for the most part) critically praised. This version was nominated for the Grammy Award for Best Immersive Audio Album.

== Track listing ==
No.	Title	Writer(s)	Length
1.	"Nomathemba"	Joseph Shabalala	4:15
2.	"Hello My Baby"	Joseph Shabalala	4:58
3.	"Diamonds on the Soles of Her Shoes (featuring Joe McBride, Melissa Etheridge)"	Paul Simon	5:42
4.	"Homeless (featuring Sarah McLachlan)"	Paul Simon	4:15
5.	"Rain Rain Beautiful Rain (featuring Natalie Merchant)"	Joseph Shabalala	3:05
6.	"How Long"	Joseph Shabalala	5:15
7.	"Mbube (featuring Taj Majal)"	Solomon Linda	4:02
8.	"Amazing Grace/Nearer My God to Thee"		3:33
9.	"Nikosi Sikelei 'lAfrica"		2:26
10.	"Inkanyezi Nezazi Star and the Wiseman"		5:06
11.	"Shosholoza (featuring Bhekumuzi Luthuli, Hugh Masekela, Lucky Dube, Nokukhanya, Phuzekhemisi, Vusi Mahlasela)"		4:54
12.	"Long Walk to Freedom Halala South Africa"	Joseph Shabalala	5:19
13.	"Thula Thula"	Joseph Shabalala	1:51
14.	"Bonus Material Biography, Videos, Pictures"
