= Wonderland (Sarah McLachlan album) =

Studio album by Sarah McLachlan
- Released: October 21, 2016
- Recorded: January – July 2016
- Studio: Sarah McLachlan's home studio in Vancouver and Pierre Marchand's studio
- Genre: Christmas
- Length: 36:47
- Label: Verve
- Producer: Pierre Marchand

Sarah McLachlan chronology
The Classic Christmas Album (2015)	Wonderland (2016)	Better Broken (2025)

Wonderland is the ninth studio album by Canadian singer-songwriter Sarah McLachlan, released on October 21, 2016 by Verve Records. It is McLachlan's second Christmas studio album, after 2006's Wintersong. The album received a nomination for Best Traditional Pop Vocal Album at the 60th Annual Grammy Awards.

== Content ==
Wonderland includes eleven Christmas songs recorded by McLachlan in 2016. The Barnes & Noble edition features two bonus tracks.

== Track listing ==
No.	Title	Writer(s)	Length
1.	"The Christmas Song"	Robert Wells; Mel Tormé	3:19
2.	"Angels We Have Heard on High"	Traditional	3:39
3.	"Let It Snow"	Sammy Cahn; Jule Styne	3:05
4.	"White Christmas"	Irving Berlin	2:23
5.	"O Come All Ye Faithful"	Traditional	3:21
6.	"Go Tell It on the Mountain"	Traditional	2:34
7.	"Away in a Manger"	Traditional	2:26
8.	"Winter Wonderland"	Felix Bernard; Richard B. Smith	2:50
9.	"Huron Carol"	Traditional	3:46
10.	"Silver Bells"	Jay Livingston; Ray Evans	4:22
11.	"O Holy Night"	Traditional	4:56

Barnes & Noble edition bonus tracks
No.	Title	Writer(s)	Length
12.	"Amazing Grace"	Traditional	4:12
13.	"Snow"	Sarah McLachlan	2:22

== Personnel ==
Credits adapted from the album's liner notes.

- Sarah McLachlan – lead vocals (all tracks), intro piano (track 1), keyboards (2, 3, 8, 10), piano (5, 9–11), acoustic guitar (7), ukulele (8)
- Pierre Marchand – production, recording, mixing (all tracks); keyboards (2, 3, 7–9, 11), drum programming (6), piano (7)
- Adam Ayan – mastering
- Michel Pépin – guitar recording
- Ashwin Sood – additional percussion (1); Taos drums, percussion (2, 3, 7, 8)
- Jérôme Beaulieu – piano (1)
- Philippe Leduc – upright bass (1)
- William Côté – drums (1)
- Brian Byrne – orchestral arrangement (3, 5, 9, 10)
- Deyan Pavlov – orchestra conductor (3, 5, 9, 10)
- Bulgarian Symphony Orchestra – orchestra (3, 5, 9, 10)
- Vladislav Boyadjiev – score engineering (3, 5, 9, 10)
- Vince May – trumpet (4)
- Yves Desrosiers – electric guitar (4, 7), ukulele (8)
- Isaac Symonds – vocals (5, 6), bass (5); stomps, claps (6); drums (9)
- Devon Portielje – guitar, vocals (5); lead vocals, stomps, claps (6); acoustic guitar (11)
- Dylan Phillips – vocals (5, 6), drums (5, 11); stomps, claps (6)
- Conner Molander – guitar, vocals (5); harmonium, stomps, claps (6); bass (11)
- Emmylou Harris – lead vocals (6), vocals (7)
- Buddy MillerAdd – Emmylou Harris recording (6, 7)
- Martha Wainwright – lead vocals (6)
- Todd Gallopo – art direction
- Josh Hernandez – design
- Kharen Hill – photos

== Charts ==
Chart (2016)	Peak position
Australian Albums (ARIA)	68
Canadian Albums (Billboard)	12
US Billboard 200	56
US Top Holiday Albums (Billboard)	5

== Certifications and sales ==
Region	Certification	Certified units/sales
Canada (Music Canada)	Gold	40,000^{^}
^{^} Shipments figures based on certification alone.

== Release history ==
Region	Date	Format	Label
Worldwide	October 21, 2016	CD; digital download; LP	Verve

== See also ==
- Wintersong
- The Classic Christmas Album
