= The Path of Thorns (Terms) =

- Canadian edition

Single by Sarah McLachlan

from the album Solace
- B-side: "Shelter"
- Released: 1991
- Genre: Pop
- Length: 5:51
- Label: Nettwerk (Canada); Arista (US)
- Songwriter: Sarah McLachlan
- Producer: Pierre Marchand

Sarah McLachlan singles chronology
"Steaming" (1989)	"The Path of Thorns (Terms)" (1991)	"Into the Fire" (1992)

The Path of Thorns (Terms) is a hit song by Sarah McLachlan from her album, Solace. This nearly six-minute ballad is one of McLachlan's longest works. It marked her first entry on the Top 40 chart in Canada and became the 50 millionth song purchased on the iTunes Store. The original music video depicts a couple dancing, but gained attention for featuring McLachlan performing nude.

== Track listings ==
Cassette (Nettwerk / Canada)

1. "The Path of Thorns (Terms) [Radio Edit]"
2. "The Path of Thorns (Terms) [Album Version]"

CD (Nettwerk / Canada)

1. "The Path of Thorns (Terms) [Radio Edit]"
2. "The Path of Thorns (Terms) [Album Version]"
3. "Shelter [Violin mix]"

Promo CD (Arista / U.S.)

1. "The Path of Thorns (Terms) [Brian Malouf Radio remix]"
2. "The Path of Thorns (Terms) [Album Edit]"

== Charts ==
=== Weekly charts ===
Chart (1991)	Peak position
Canada Top Singles (RPM)	24
Canada Adult Contemporary (RPM)	12
Canada Canadian Content (RPM)	1

=== Year-end charts ===
Chart (1991)	Position
Canada Adult Contemporary (RPM)	89
