= Rarities, B-Sides and Other Stuff Volume 2 =

Rarities, B-Sides, and Other Stuff Volume 2

Compilation album by Sarah McLachlan
- Released: 29 April 2008
- Recorded: 1996–2007
- Genre: Pop
- Label: Nettwerk (Canada); Arista (US)
- Producer: Pierre Marchand

Sarah McLachlan chronology
Wintersong (2006)	Rarities, B-Sides, and Other Stuff Volume 2 (2008)	Closer: The Best of Sarah McLachlan (2008)

Professional ratings
Review scores
Source	Rating
Allmusic	2.5/5 stars

Rarities, B-Sides, and Other Stuff Volume 2 is the second compilation album of rarities by Canadian singer-songwriter Sarah McLachlan, released in April 2008, twelve years after its predecessor.

== Track listing ==
No.	Title	Writer(s)	Producer(s)	Length
1.	"Ordinary Miracle" (from Charlotte's Web)	David A. Stewart; Glen Ballard	Stewart; Ballard	3:06
2.	"Blackbird" (from I Am Sam)	John Lennon; Paul McCartney	Pierre Marchand	2:21
3.	"Time After Time" (with Cyndi Lauper) (from The Body Acoustic)	Lauper; Rob Hyman	Lauper; Rick Chertoff; William Wittman	4:19
4.	"River" (from Wintersong)	Joni Mitchell	Marchand	4:02
5.	"When She Loved Me" (from Toy Story 2)	Randy Newman	Newman; Sarah McLachlan	3:04
6.	"Don't Let Go" (with Bryan Adams) (from Spirit: Stallion of the Cimarron)	Adams; Gavin Greenaway; Robert John "Mutt" Lange; Gretchen Peters	Greenaway; Adams	4:04
7.	"Just Like Me" (with DMC) (from Checks Thugs and Rock n Roll)	Darryl McDaniels; Harry Chapin; Sandra Chapin	Ashwin Sood; Professor Funk	5:12
8.	"Angel" (Live with Emmylou Harris) (from Lilith Fair: A Celebration of Women in Music, Volume 2)	McLachlan	Marchand	5:57
9.	"Pills" (Live with The Perishers) (from The Perishers Live)	Ola Klüft; Måns Lundberg	The Perishers; Henrik Oja	3:56
10.	"Homeless" (with Ladysmith Black Mambazo) (from Long Walk to Freedom)	Joseph Shabalala; Paul Simon	Shabalala	4:15
11.	"The Rainbow Connection" (from For the Kids)	Paul Williams; Kenneth Ascher	Marchand; Chris Potter	3:32
12.	"Prayer of St. Francis" (from Surfacing bonus disc)	Traditional	Marchand; McLachlan	2:02
13.	"Unchained Melody" (from Pine Ridge: An Open Letter to Allan Rock – Songs for Leonard Peltier)	Alex North; Hy Zaret	Marchand	4:50
14.	"Silence" (with Delerium) (DJ Tiësto's in Search of Sunrise Remix) from Remixed)	Bill Leeb; Rhys Fulber; McLachlan	Delerium; Tiësto	11:37

== Charts ==
Chart (2008)	Peak position
Canadian Albums (Billboard)	2
UK Albums (OCC)	193
US Billboard 200	44

== Certifications and sales ==
Region	Certification	Certified units/sales
Canada (Music Canada)	Gold	50,000^{^}
^{^} Shipments figures based on certification alone.

== See also ==
- Rarities, B-Sides and Other Stuff
