= Wintersong =

2006 studio album by Sarah McLachlan

Studio album by Sarah McLachlan
- Released: 17 October 2006
- Recorded: 1994, Spring-Summer 2006
- Genre: Christmas
- Length: 45:43
- Label: Nettwerk (Canada); Arista (US)
- Producer: Pierre Marchand

Sarah McLachlan chronology
Mirrorball: The Complete Concert (2006)	Wintersong (2006)	Rarities, B-Sides and Other Stuff Volume 2 (2008)

Professional ratings
Review scores
Source	Rating
Allmusic	3/5 stars
Blogcritics	(?)
Entertainment Weekly	B+
Slant Magazine	3/5 stars

Wintersong is the sixth album and first Christmas album by Canadian singer-songwriter Sarah McLachlan, released in October 2006. It was produced by longtime collaborator Pierre Marchand and includes contributions from Jim Creeggan of Barenaked Ladies. The album also includes a collaboration with Jazz musician Diana Krall. In 2007, the album was nominated for a Grammy Award for Best Traditional Pop Vocal Album. In 2015, all songs from Wintersong plus five more tracks were released as The Classic Christmas Album.

== Singles ==
"River" was released as a single from that album in September 2006. The song was performed in mid-October on The Tonight Show with Jay Leno and The Ellen DeGeneres Show and reached No. 71 in the Billboard Hot 100. McLachlan's video for "River" premiered on Yahoo! music, on 1 November 2006. Silent Night from this album was used in an ASPCA commercial

=== Charts ===
Year	Single	Chart	Peak position
2006	River	Billboard Hot 100	71
2006	River	Pop 100	70
2006	River	Hot Digital Songs	66
2007	River	Hot Adult Contemporary Tracks	8
2007	Have Yourself A Merry Little Christmas	Hot Adult Contemporary Tracks	6
2007	Happy Xmas (War Is Over)	Hot Adult Contemporary Tracks	5

== Commercial performance ==
Wintersong debuted at number 42 on the Billboard 200 in the United States (chart issue for the week of 3 November 2006), selling 20,000 copies in its first week. The album peaked at number 7 in its seventh week on the chart, with 116,000 copies sold for the tracking period ending 3 December. According to sales data from Nielsen/SoundScan, it was the best-selling holiday album of 2006 in the U.S. with a cumulative 759,000 copies sold for the year.

On 13 December 2007, Wintersong was certified Platinum by the Recording Industry Association of America for shipments of one million copies in the U.S. In Canada, it has sold over 300,000 copies, and has been certified Triple Platinum.

In 2011, the album re-entered the Billboard 200 at number 195 on the chart issue for the week of 17 December.

== Track listing ==
No.	Title	Writer(s)	Length
1.	"Happy Xmas (War Is Over)"	John Lennon; Yoko Ono	3:28
2.	"What Child Is This? (Greensleeves)"	William Chatterton Dix	3:31
3.	"River"	Joni Mitchell	4:02
4.	"Wintersong"	Sarah McLachlan	3:31
5.	"I'll Be Home for Christmas"	Walter Kent; Kim Gannon	3:15
6.	"O Little Town of Bethlehem"	Phillips Brooks; Lewis Redner	3:51
7.	"The First Noel / Mary Mary"	Traditional	5:00
8.	"Silent Night"	Josef Mohr; Franz X. Gruber	3:48
9.	"Song for a Winter's Night"	Gordon Lightfoot	3:48
10.	"Have Yourself a Merry Little Christmas"	Hugh Martin; Ralph Blane	3:44
11.	"In the Bleak Mid-Winter"	Christina Rossetti; Gustav Holst	3:46
12.	"Christmas Time Is Here" (featuring Diana Krall)	Vince Guaraldi; Lee Mendelson	3:59

A "sampler" CD exists, featuring similar artwork on a cardboard sleeve, which omits "Happy Xmas (War Is Over)", "I'll Be Home for Christmas", "Song for a Winter's Night", and "Have Yourself a Merry Little Christmas".

== Personnel ==
- Sarah McLachlan - Vocals, Piano, Harp, Dobro
- Pierre Marchand - Keyboards, Programming, Synth Bass, Quartet Manipulations, Vienna Keyboard Strings
- Jim Creeggan - Double Bass
- Colin Cripps - Guitar, Dobro
- Diana Krall - Piano on "Christmas Time Is Here".
- Ashwin Sood - Drums, Percussion
- Luke Doucet - Guitar
- Bill Dillon - Acoustic & Electric Guitar, Mandolin, Bass
- Bob Doige - Sleigh Bells
- Daryl Johnson - Bass
- Vince Mai - Trumpet, Flugelhorn
- Brian Minato - Bass
- David Kershaw - Keyboards
- David Sinclair - Guitar

== Charts ==
=== Weekly charts ===
Chart (2006)	Peak position
Canadian Albums (Billboard)	1
US Billboard 200	7
US Top Holiday Albums (Billboard)	1

=== Year-end charts ===
Chart (2006)	Position
Canadian Albums (Nielsen SoundScan)	9
Canadian Digital Albums (Nielsen SoundScan)	1
US Top Holiday Albums (Nielsen SoundScan)	1
Chart (2007)	Position
US Billboard 200	71

== Certifications and sales ==
Region	Certification	Certified units/sales
Canada (Music Canada)	3× Platinum	300,000^{^}
United States (RIAA)	Platinum	1,100,000
^{^} Shipments figures based on certification alone.

== See also ==
- List of Billboard Top Holiday Albums number ones of the 2000s
- The Classic Christmas Album
- Wonderland
