= Solace (Sarah McLachlan album) =

Studio album by Sarah McLachlan
- Released: June 1991 (Canada); 28 January 1992 (US)
- Studios: Morin Heights at Lars Westvind's house, in Vancouver at Mushroom Studio and Venture Studios and in New Orleans at Karen's House
- Genre: Pop
- Length: 45:31
- Labels: Nettwerk (Canada); Arista (US)
- Producer: Pierre Marchand

Sarah McLachlan chronology
| Touch (1988) | Solace (1991) | Fumbling Towards Ecstasy (1993) |

Singles from Solace
- 1. "The Path of Thorns (Terms)" Released: 1991; 2. "Into the Fire" Released: 19 October 1991; 3. "Drawn to the Rhythm" Released: 7 February 1992; 4. "I Will Not Forget You" Released: 1992; 5. "Wear Your Love Like Heaven" Released: 1992

Solace is the second studio album by Canadian singer-songwriter Sarah McLachlan, released in June 1991, on Nettwerk in Canada and in January 1992, on Arista Records in the United States. It was the album that first made her a star in Canada, spawning the hit singles "The Path of Thorns (Terms)" and "Into the Fire" and being certified double platinum for sales of 200,000 copies in Canada. This was also the first of many Sarah McLachlan albums produced by Pierre Marchand.

Although the album received favourable reviews internationally, her commercial breakthrough outside of Canada would not come until her next full album, Fumbling Towards Ecstasy. Although McLachlan has not discarded the album's songs from her concerts so completely as those of Touch, nothing from Solace has been performed live since 1999 except for "The Path of Thorns (Terms)", which was performed 19 times between 2010 and 2012.

== Critical reception ==
Professional ratings
Review scores
| Source | Rating |
|---|---|
| AllMusic | 4.5/5 stars |
| Chicago Tribune | 2.5/4 stars |
| Los Angeles Times | 3.5/4 stars |
| NME | 6/10 |
| The Rolling Stone Album Guide | 3.5/5 stars |

In a review for the Los Angeles Times, Steve Hochman said that Solace "gorgeously recalls" Joni Mitchell, Judy Collins, and Sandy Denny "without sounding derivative", praising McLachlan's "strong, emotional songwriting and singing" and Marchand's "atmospheric yet involving production". Gary Dretzka was more ambivalent in the Chicago Tribune, commenting that the album's songs "are not without some poetic beauty", but "no one piece really stands out" due to their similar "somber emotional range". Writing for NME, David Quantick found the record merely promising, with "hints of possible excellence".

Retrospectively, AllMusic critic Kelly McCartney deemed Solace "a wonderful record that offers a glimpse of the astounding talent of a young Sarah McLachlan", writing that McLachlan avoided the "sophomore jinx" with "a superior collection of songs and performances". Richard Skanse stated in the 2004 Rolling Stone Album Guide that Solace "represented a considerable leap in maturity and focus" for McLachlan, noting the album's "less muddled" production and its songs' "sharper hooks and distinctive melodies".

== Track listing ==
All tracks are written by Sarah McLachlan, except where otherwise noted.

CD: Nettwerk / W2-30055 (Canada)
| No. | Title | Writer(s) | Length |
|---|---|---|---|
| 1. | "Drawn to the Rhythm" | | 4:08 |
| 2. | "Into the Fire" | Sarah McLachlan; Pierre Marchand | 3:34 |
| 3. | "The Path of Thorns (Terms)" | | 5:51 |
| 4. | "I Will Not Forget You" | McLachlan; Darren Phillips | 5:20 |
| 5. | "Lost" | | 5:03 |
| 6. | "Back Door Man" | | 4:00 |
| 7. | "Shelter" | | 3:23 |
| 8. | "Black" | | 5:04 |
| 9. | "Home" | | 4:45 |
| 10. | "Mercy" | | 4:23 |
| Total length: | | | 45:31 |

Bonus track (Arista)
| No. | Title | Writer(s) | Length |
|---|---|---|---|
| 11. | "Wear Your Love Like Heaven" | Donovan | 3:19 |
| Total length: | | | 48:50 |

Note: In Canada, "Wear Your Love Like Heaven" appeared on Nettwerk's Donovan tribute album, Island of Circles.

== Personnel ==
- Sarah McLachlan – Vocals, Acoustic Guitar, Piano
- Pierre Marchand – Electric Guitar, Mandolin, Bass, Piano, Organ, Keyboards, Accordion Reeds, Percussion
- Bill Dillon – Acoustic and Electric Guitars, Mandolin, Pedal Steel, Guitorgan, Billatron
- Leo Nocentelli – Electric Guitar
- Daryl Exnicious – Bass, Background Vocals
- Hugh McMillan – Bass
- Jocelyne Lanois – Bass
- Alan Gevaert – Bass
- Deni Bonet – Violin, Viola
- Peter "Harpy" Conway – Harmonica
- Ronald Jones – Drums, Percussion
- Paul Brennan – Drums
- Ashwin Sood – Drums
- Michel Dupirre – Percussion
- Ken "Hiwatt" Marshall, Greg Reely – Engineers
- Andre Paquet – Freelancer
- Kharen Hill Album photography for publicity and artwork

== Charts ==
=== Weekly charts ===
Weekly chart performance for Solace
| Chart (1991–92) | Peak position |
|---|---|
| Canada Top Albums/CDs (RPM) | 21 |
| Canadian Albums (The Record) | 20 |
| US Billboard 200 | 167 |

=== Year-end charts ===
1991 year-end chart performance for Solace
| Chart (1991) | Position |
|---|---|
| Canada Top Albums/CDs (RPM) | 97 |

== Certifications and sales ==
Certifications and sales for Solace
| Region | Certification | Certified units/sales |
|---|---|---|
| Canada (Music Canada) | 2× Platinum | 200,000^{^} |
| United States (RIAA) | Gold | 671,000 |
^{^} Shipments figures based on certification alone.
