= Touch (Sarah McLachlan album) =

- Original 1988 release

Studio album by Sarah McLachlan
- Released: 11 October 1988; 3 April 1989 (re-release)
- Genre: Pop
- Length: 47:54 (1988); 47:31 (1989)
- Labels: Nettwerk; Capitol (1988); Arista (1989)
- Producer: Greg Reely

Sarah McLachlan chronology
Touch (1988)	Solace (1991)

Alternative cover

Singles from Touch
- 1. "Vox" Released: October 21, 1988; 2. "Steaming" Released: 1989

Touch is the debut album by Canadian singer-songwriter Sarah McLachlan. It was originally released on October 11, 1988, through Nettwerk and Capitol Records. The album was then re-released on April 3, 1989, through Nettwerk and Arista Records with additional material and new cover art. The album includes "Vox", McLachlan's debut single, which reached number 90 in Canada upon its release.

McLachlan did not achieve commercial stardom until 1991 in Canada, with Solace; she achieved success internationally in 1994–1995 with her 1993 album Fumbling Towards Ecstasy. In 1993, McLachlan and Nettwerk were sued by Darryl Neudorf, a Vancouver musician and former member of 54-40, who alleged that he had made an uncredited songwriting contribution to four songs on Touch ("Vox", "Steaming", "Sad Clown" and "Strange World"). Although both McLachlan and Nettwerk acknowledged that Neudorf was involved in the album's production, both took the position that his contribution had not been primarily in songwriting. The judge in that suit ultimately ruled in McLachlan's favor.

Professional ratings
Review scores
Source	Rating
AllMusic	2.5/5 stars
Stereo Review	very good

== Track listing ==
All tracks written by Sarah McLachlan, except "Steaming" and "Uphill Battle" (music by McLachlan and Darren Phillips).

Original release (1988)
No.	Title	Length
1.	"Out of the Shadows"	4:57
2.	"Steaming"	4:45
3.	"Strange World"	4:05
4.	"Touch" (instrumental)	3:11
5.	"Vox"	4:50
6.	"Sad Clown"	4:28
7.	"Uphill Battle" (instrumental)	4:37
8.	"Ben's Song"	4:55
Total length:		35:48

Bonus tracks (CD)
No.	Title	Length
9.	"Vox" (extended remix)	6:59
10.	"Ben's Song" (78 remix)	5:07
Total length:		47:54

Re-release (1989)
No.	Title	Length
1.	"Out of the Shadows"	4:57
2.	"Vox"	4:48
3.	"Strange World"	4:05
4.	"Trust"	4:45
5.	"Touch" (instrumental)	3:11
6.	"Steaming"	4:46
7.	"Sad Clown"	4:28
8.	"Uphill Battle" (instrumental)	4:37
9.	"Ben's Song"	4:55
Total length:		40:32

Bonus track (CD and cassette)
No.	Title	Length
10.	"Vox" (extended)	6:59
Total length:		47:31

Notes:

- Some pressings credit "Trust" to McLachlan, Stephen Nikleva, Jeff Sawatzky, Sherri Iwaschuk, and Phillips.
- Not all versions of the original 1988 release contained tracks 9 and 10.

== Personnel ==
- Sarah McLachlan – vocals, 12-string and classical guitars, piano, keyboards
- Stephen Nikleva – electric guitar
- David Kershaw – bass guitar, double bass, backing vocals
- Jeff Krosse (aka Jeff Sawatzky) – bass guitar, backing vocals
- Naomi McLeod – backing vocals
- Greg Reely – drums, percussion
- Darren Phillips – drums, percussion, keyboards
- Ross Hales – drums
- Sherri Leigh (aka Sherri Iwaschuk) – percussion
- Tippi – percussion
- Steve – percussion
- Rudy – percussion

== Charts ==
Chart (1988–89)	Peak position
Canada Top Albums/CDs (RPM)	61
US Billboard 200	132

The RPM Albums Chart between October 1988 and April 1989 is not available. The Touch peak position is taken from May 1989.

== Certifications and sales ==
Region	Certification	Certified units/sales
Canada (Music Canada)	Platinum	100,000^{^}
United States (RIAA)	Gold	500,000^{^}
^{^} Shipments figures based on certification alone.
