= Into the Fire (Sarah McLachlan song) =

- Canadian/U.S. edition

Single by Sarah McLachlan

from the album Solace
- B-side: "Sad Clown"; "Black"
- Released: 19 October 1991
- Genre: Alternative rock
- Length: 3:31
- Label: Nettwerk (Canada); Arista (US)
- Songwriters: Sarah McLachlan, Pierre Marchand
- Producer: Pierre Marchand

Sarah McLachlan singles chronology
"The Path of Thorns (Terms)" (1991)	"Into the Fire" (1991)	"Drawn to the Rhythm" (1992)

"Into the Fire" was the second single from Sarah McLachlan's album Solace. It was written by McLachlan and her producer Pierre Marchand.

== Music video ==
The music video was one of the rare instances to portray full nudity: the first half showed McLachlan lying in a wooded field, completely naked and covered from head to toe in mud, before walking underneath a waterfall, washing the mud off, and proceeding to sing by it dry and fully clothed in the second half. Interspersed throughout were shots of a young girl running through the woods in slow-motion.

== Track listing ==
=== 7": Arista / 115 266 (Germany, UK) ===
1. "Into the Fire (Album version)"
2. "Into the Fire (John Fryer Mix)"

=== CD: Nettwerk / W2-3063 (Canada) ===
1. "Into the Fire"
2. "Sad Clown (CBC version)"
3. "Black (CBC version)"
- Also released on cassette 4JW-3063

=== CD: Arista / ASCD-2390 (US) ===
1. "Into the Fire (John Fryer Mix)" (3:32)
2. "Into the Fire (Album Version)" (3:29)
- US promo release

=== 12": ADP-2402 (US) ===
1. "Into the Fire (extended remix)"
2. "Into the Fire (dub)"
3. "Into the Fire (John Fryer mix)"
- US promo release

=== CD: Arista / ASCD-2402 (US) ===
1. "Into the Fire (extended remix)"
2. "Into the Fire (dub)"
3. "Into the Fire (John Fryer mix)"
4. "Into the Fire (Album version)"
- US promo release

== Charts ==
Chart (1991–92)	Peak position
Canada Top Singles (RPM)	30
US Alternative Airplay (Billboard)	4
