= Sarah McLachlan =

Canadian musician (born 1968)

Sarah McLachlan OC OBC
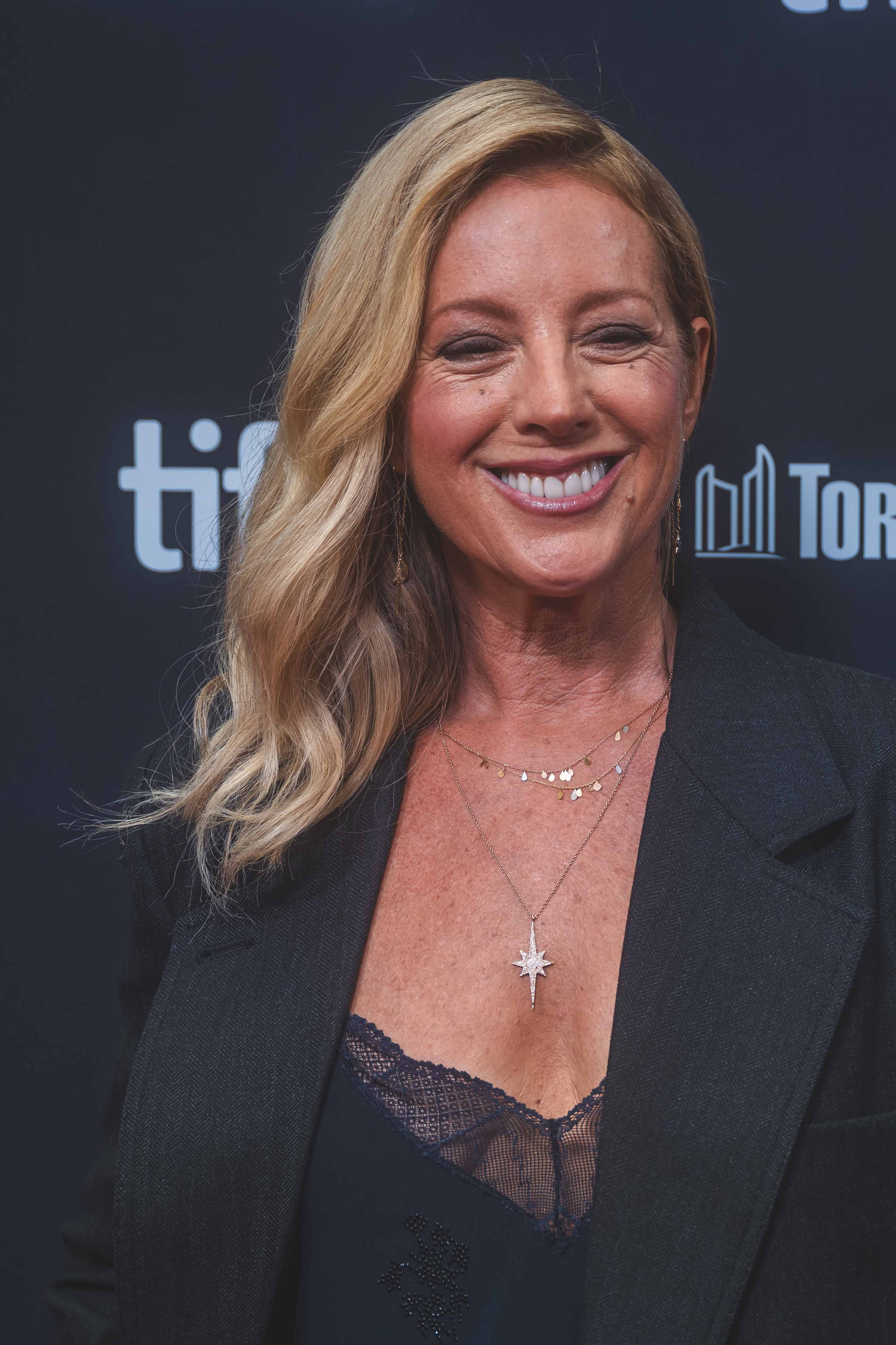
- McLachlan in 2025

Background information
- Born: January 28, 1968 (age 58); Halifax, Nova Scotia, Canada
- Genres: Pop; alt-pop; folk-pop; pop rock
- Occupation: Singer-songwriter
- Instruments: Vocals; piano; guitar; ukulele; harp
- Years active: 1987–present
- Labels: Nettwerk Music Group; Arista; Verve; Concord
- Website: sarahmclachlan.com

Sarah Ann McLachlan (born January 28, 1968) is a Canadian singer-songwriter. As of 2025, she has sold over 40 million albums worldwide. McLachlan's best-selling album is Surfacing (1997), for which she won two Grammy Awards (out of four nominations) and four Juno Awards. She has won three Grammy and twelve Juno Awards in total and is a member of the Canadian Music Hall of Fame and the Canadian Songwriters Hall of Fame.

== Early life ==
McLachlan was born on January 28, 1968, in Halifax, Nova Scotia, and was raised as the youngest of three adopted children by Dorice McLachlan and her husband, Jack, a marine biologist. She began playing the ukulele at age four, and studied classical guitar, piano, voice, and opera over 12 years at the Maritime Conservatory of Performing Arts.

At 17, while still a student at Queen Elizabeth High School, McLachlan fronted a rock band called The October Game. The October Game's first concert at Dalhousie University was as an opener for Moev, after which McLachlan was offered a recording contract by Moev's manager, Mark Jowett, who had recently co-founded Vancouver record label Nettwerk Records. McLachlan finished high school and spent a year studying jewelery design at the Nova Scotia College of Art and Design before moving to Vancouver and signing with Nettwerk, with its co-founder Terry McBride as her manager.

== Career ==
=== 1987–1992: Touch and Solace ===
After taking nearly two years to build a repertoire, McLachlan recorded her first album, 1987's Touch, which achieved both critical and commercial success. During this period she also contributed to an album by Moev, provided vocals on Manufacture's "As the End Draws Near", and embarked on her first national concert tour as an opening act for another Nettwerk band, The Grapes of Wrath.

Nettwerk differed from other labels in its prioritization of touring over radio airplay: Mark Jowett asserted that "Radio is not the lifeblood of the music industry—it’s the lifeblood of certain acts." After beginning to tour with The Grapes of Wrath in October 1988, McLachlan would tour continuously until 1996.

McLachlan's 1991 album, Solace, was her mainstream breakthrough in Canada, spawning the hit singles "The Path of Thorns (Terms)" and "Into the Fire.” Solace also marked the beginning of her ongoing partnership with producer Pierre Marchand. The album was certified double platinum in Canada and gold in the US.

=== 1993–2002: Fumbling Towards Ecstasy, The Freedom Sessions, Surfacing, Mirrorball ===
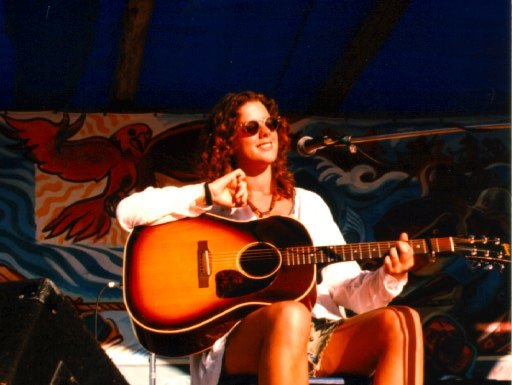
McLachlan at a 1993 benefit for Clayoquot Sound

1993's Fumbling Towards Ecstasy was an immediate hit in Canada. The song "Possession" was included on the first Due South soundtrack in 1996. The album also sparked McLachlan's international breakthrough, reaching No. 50 on the Billboard 200 and becoming her first to chart on the ARIA. Nettwerk was the first record label to have a website and the first to release Enhanced CDs, which may have contributed to McLachlan's breakout success. In 1994, she released The Freedom Sessions, a collection of alternative versions of songs from Fumbling Towards Ecstasy. It became the first Enhanced CD to debut on the Billboard 200 and then be certified gold.

In 1997, McLachlan released Surfacing, which became her best-selling album and won two Grammy Awards, one for Best Female Pop Vocal Performance (for lead single "Building a Mystery") and one for Best Pop Instrumental Performance (for "Last Dance"). It also won four Juno Awards, including Album of the Year for Surfacing, and Song of the Year and Songwriter of the Year for "Building a Mystery". Reaching number one on the Canadian Albums Chart and number two on the US Billboard 200, the album has since sold over 16 million copies.

The fourth single from Surfacing, "Angel", became a massive international hit. It was inspired by the fatal overdose, in a hotel room, of Smashing Pumpkins touring keyboardist Jonathan Melvoin, with whose depression and loneliness from long stretches on tour McLachlan identified. Run-DMC's Darryl McDaniels claimed the song "saved my life," and later featured McLachlan on his 2006 album Checks Thugs and Rock n Roll. In 1998, "Angel" featured in the motion picture City of Angels, whose soundtrack reached number one on the Billboard 200; more than five months after the film left theaters, the soundtrack remained in Billboard's top 40 albums and earned quadruple-platinum status. Another song from Surfacing, "Full of Grace", featured in the Season 2 finale of Buffy the Vampire Slayer; Season 1 episode 4 of Dawson's Creek; and the film Moll Flanders.

In June 1999, McLachlan released the live album Mirrorball. Its singles included a new live version of her 1995 song, "I Will Remember You", which had first been released on the soundtrack of the film The Brothers McMullen, and then on McLachlan's 1996 compilation album Rarities, B-Sides and Other Stuff. As a single, in 1995, it had peaked at No. 65 on the US Billboard Hot 100 and No. 10 in Canada; the 1999 version peaked at No. 14 on the Hot 100, reached No. 10 in Canada, and earned McLachlan her third Grammy Award for Best Female Pop Vocal Performance. Also in 1999, McLachlan performed as the off-screen singing voice of Jessie in Toy Story 2, and recorded the Randy Newman song "When She Loved Me" for the film's soundtrack. The song was nominated for the Academy Award for Best Original Song in 2000, and McLachlan performed it live at the ceremony.

=== Lilith Fair ===
In 1996, McLachlan became frustrated with concert promoters' refusals to feature two female musicians, and radio stations' unspoken rule against playing two consecutive tracks by female artists. After a nine-month hiatus following her three years of touring in support of Fumbling Towards Ecstasy, McLachlan accepted Terry McBride's suggestion that she again go on the road, but insisted that the shows include a second female headliner, Paula Cole. At least one of their appearances together, in Vancouver on September 14, 1996, went by the name "Lilith Fair," after the medieval Jewish legendary character. The show included performances by McLachlan, Cole, Lisa Loeb, and Michelle McAdorey.

The next year, McLachlan founded the Lilith Fair tour. The 1997 tour earned $16 million, making it the highest-grossing touring festival and 16th highest-grossing festival overall in that year. Over three years, the tour brought together two million people and raised over $10 million for charity. It was the most successful all-female music festival in history, one of the biggest music festivals of the 1990s, and helped launch the careers of Missy Elliott, Erykah Badu, Dido, Nelly Furtado, Christina Aguilera, and Tegan and Sara, among others. Subsequent Lilith Fairs followed in 1998 and 1999 before the tour was discontinued.

Nettwerk CEO and Lilith Fair co-founder Terry McBride announced that the all-female festival would make its return in mid-2010 in Canada, the United States, and Europe. A list of 36 North American shows was released, but poor ticket sales, financial problems, and headliner withdrawals caused 13 of the shows to be cancelled. The European tour never materialized.

In 2025, McLachlan appeared in the documentary Lilith Fair: Building a Mystery – The Untold Story, which reflects on the legacy and cultural impact of the festival.

=== 2003–2006: Afterglow, Wintersong ===
McLachlan took a hiatus following the death of her mother in December 2001, and the birth of her first daughter five months later. She released her fifth studio album, Afterglow, in November 2003. The album was preceded by the single "Fallen" in September, while two of its tracks, "Stupid" and "World on Fire", were released as supporting singles the following year. McLachlan had contemplated the prospect of losing career momentum during the album's creation and has described its writing process as similar to "extracting blood from a stone." The album was written over a two-and-a-half-year period and recorded at Marchand's home studio in Montreal and McLachlan's home studio in Vancouver. Afterglow topped the Canadian Albums Chart, and debuted at No. 2 in the US, with over 300,000 copies sold in its opening week. It has since been certified 5× platinum in Canada, and 2× platinum in the US. "Fallen" was nominated for Best Female Pop Vocal Performance at the 46th Annual Grammy Awards, while Afterglow received a nomination for Best Pop Vocal Album at the 47th Annual Grammy Awards.

Prior to embarking on the Afterglow Live tour in May 2004, McLachlan released the digital extended play Acoustic Live, which included renditions of two songs from Afterglow, and re-recorded "World on Fire" with Robbie Robertson for the TNT series Into the West. The tour took place through 2005. Afterglow Live, a CD+DVD recording package of one of the tour's Canadian stops, was released in November 2004.

In October 2006, McLachlan released a Christmas album, Wintersong. The album comprised 11 new recordings, including covers of Joni Mitchell's "River", Gordon Lightfoot's "Song for a Winter's Night", and John Lennon's "Happy Xmas (War Is Over)", which McLachlan recorded with her outreach children and youth choir. Wintersong debuted at No. 42 on the Billboard 200 and was certified Platinum in the US in December 2007, selling 1.1 million copies by 2016. In Canada, it is certified 3× Platinum. Wintersong was nominated for both a Grammy Award, in the Best Traditional Pop Vocal Album category, as well as a Juno Award, for Pop Album of the Year.

On October 3, 2006, Mirrorball was re-released as Mirrorball: The Complete Concert. The release contained two discs compiled from two concerts performed on consecutive nights in April 1998 at the Rose Garden in Portland, Oregon. Two compilation albums were then released: Closer: The Best of Sarah McLachlan in 2008 and, The Essential in 2010.

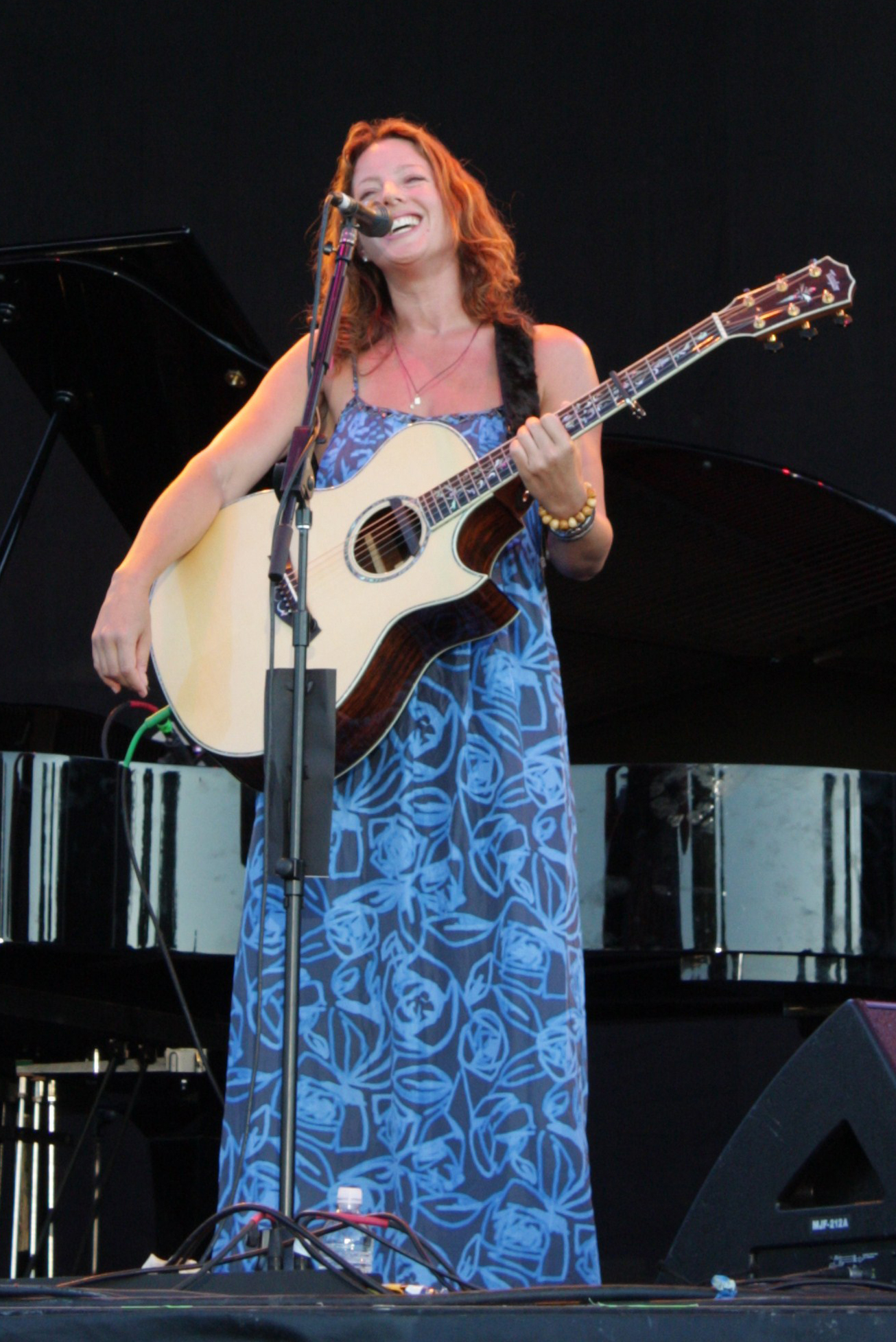
McLachlan performing in 2009

=== 2014–2015: Shine On ===
In February 2011, citing the need for "change", McLachlan announced that she was ending her professional relationship with Terry McBride and leaving Nettwerk. Both parties described the separation as amicable.

On May 6, 2014, McLachlan released the studio album Shine On, her first on Verve Records, which was inspired by the 2010 death of her father. The album debuted at No. 4 on the Billboard 200, with 42,000 copies sold during the week ending May 11. The 30-city US Shine On tour began with a concert in Seattle on June 20. The Canadian leg, in October and November, included 25 shows in 21 cities. Shine On won Adult Contemporary Album of the Year at the 2015 Juno Awards.

=== 2016–2020: Wonderland ===
On July 17, 2016, in New Orleans, McLachlan began a 24-city run as the special guest of Josh Groban on his Stages tour, which concluded at the end of August.

On October 21, 2016, McLachlan released Wonderland, her ninth studio and second Christmas album. She promoted the album with various televised performances, including at the Macy's Thanksgiving Day Parade on November 24, ABC's CMA Country Christmas special on November 28, and NBC's Christmas in Rockefeller Center special on November 30. That December, McLachlan released the single "The Long Goodbye".

In January 2019, McLachlan was announced as the host of the Juno Awards of 2019.

=== 2023–present: 30th anniversary of Fumbling Towards Ecstasy and Better Broken ===
McLachlan participated in an all-star recording of Serena Ryder's 2012 song "What I Wouldn't Do" in 2023. It was released as a charity single on March 2 to benefit the Feel Out Loud campaign by Kids Help Phone in support of youth mental health. At the end of the year, she announced a 30-city tour (her first major tour since 2016) to be held in 2024 for the 30th anniversary of Fumbling Towards Ecstasy (1993). The setlist was to include the album's entire tracklist in addition to other songs from her repertoire; in November 2024, after being postponed due to McLachlan's acute laryngitis, the tour was cancelled. In April 2025, she reannounced the previously cancelled Canadian dates.

In April 2024, McLachlan stated she was working on new music with producer Tony Berg. Her tenth studio album, Better Broken, was released on September 19, 2025. McLachlan announced the Better Broken Tour in support of the album in September 2025 commencing in November the same year.

In November 2026, McLachlan will perform the Canadian national anthem before the 113th Grey Cup in Calgary, Alberta.

=== Additional projects and guest appearances ===
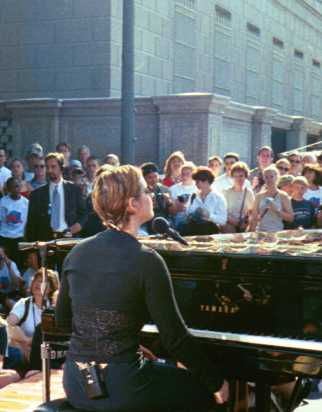
McLachlan performing for Good Morning America in 1998

In 1997, McLachlan co-wrote and provided guest vocals on the Delerium song "Silence" for their album Karma. The song achieved significant US top-40 airplay when released as a single in late 2000, and also featured on the soundtrack for the film Brokedown Palace. It has been hailed as one of the greatest trance songs of all time. The Tiësto remix of the song was voted by Mixmag readers as the 12th greatest dance record of all time.

In 2001, McLachlan provided background vocals, guitar, and piano on the closing track "Love Is" from Stevie Nicks' eighth solo album, Trouble in Shangri-La, in addition to drawing the stylized letter S that appears on the album cover. In May 2002, "Don't Let Go", on which she played piano and sang harmony in a duet with Bryan Adams, appeared on the Spirit: Stallion of the Cimarron soundtrack.

In 2003, she appeared as a celebrity NPC in The Sims Superstar.

In November 2006, McLachlan contributed "Ordinary Miracle" to the soundtrack of Charlotte's Web. Despite rumors of a potential Oscar nod, the song was not nominated. She performed the song on The Oprah Winfrey Show; during the Macy's Thanksgiving Day Parade; and at the opening ceremony of the 2010 Winter Olympics.

McLachlan participated in Dave Stewart's 2007 single "Go Green", alongside Nadirah X, Imogen Heap, Natalie Imbruglia, and others. The song was released that April in honour of Earth Day.

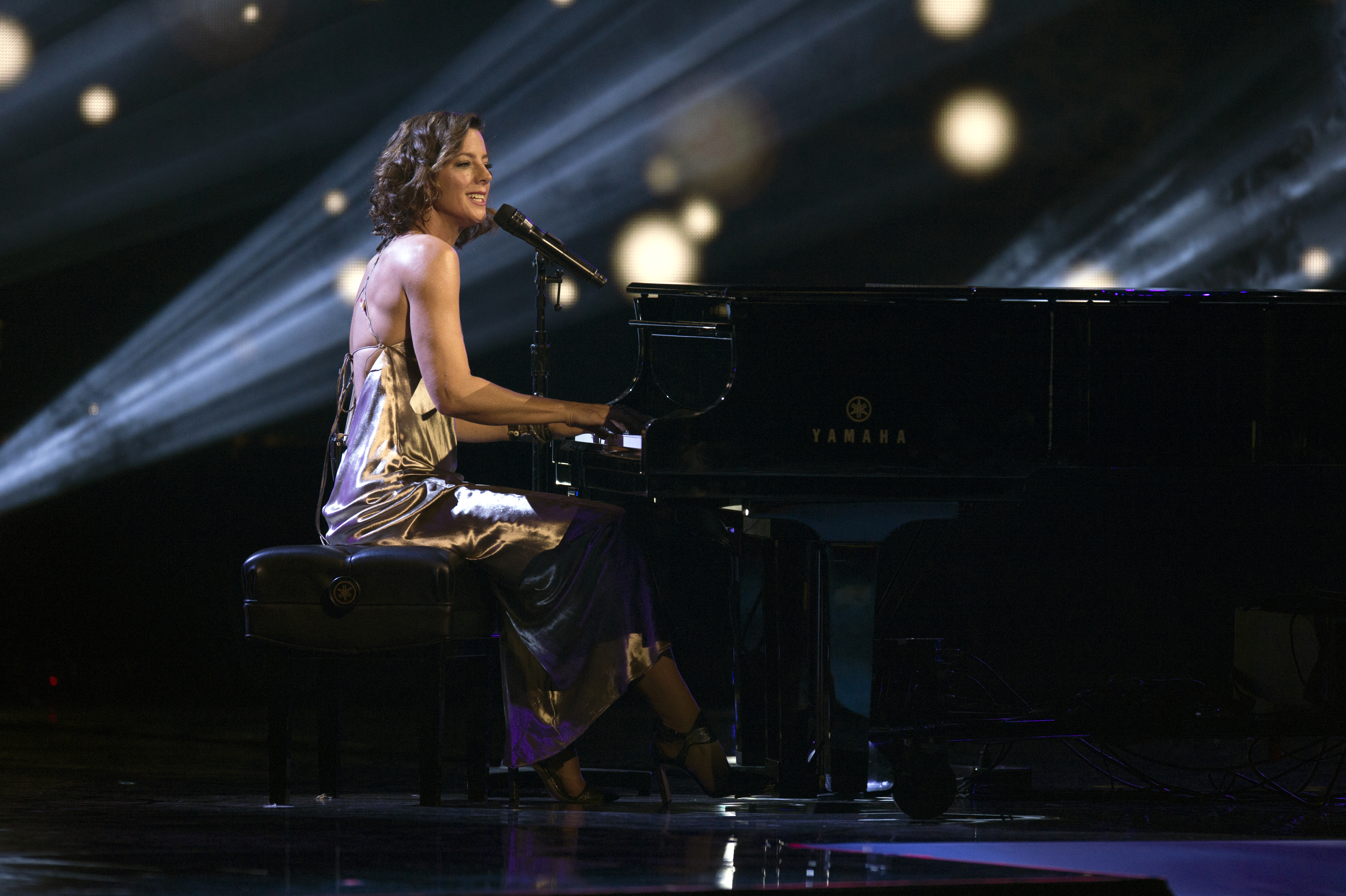
McLachlan performing at the 2017 Invictus Games opening ceremony

In 2009, McLachlan provided backing vocals and piano on Susan Enan's song "Bring on the Wonder", which was featured in the television show Bones. McLachlan included the song on her 2010 album Laws of Illusion.

On September 10, 2011, McLachlan performed "I Will Remember You" and "Angel" at a ceremony in Stonycreek, Pennsylvania, commemorating the passengers and crew of United Airlines Flight 93. The event marked the dedication of the Flight 93 National Memorial and was attended by former president George W. Bush, former first lady Laura Bush, former president Bill Clinton, Vice President Joe Biden and Speaker John Boehner.

On June 13, 2019, McLachlan sang "O Canada" before Game 6 of the 2019 NBA Finals.

In 2025, McLachlan made a guest appearance on The Simpsons episode "Estranger Things", where she performed a parody of her song, "When She Loved Me".

== Legal issues ==
In 1994, McLachlan was sued by Uwe Vandrei, an obsessed fan from Ottawa, who alleged that his letters to her had been the basis of the single "Possession". Vandrei was an admitted stalker whose acknowledged goal in filing the lawsuit was to be near McLachlan. He died by suicide shortly before the trial began.

In 1999, McLachlan was sued by Darryl Neudorf, a producer and former drummer for 54-40 who had been hired by Nettwerk early in McLachlan's career to help her write songs. Neudorf believed that he was owed credit and compensation for four of the resultant songs on her first album Touch; the claim was dismissed by the judge after trial.

== Personal life ==
McLachlan, who continues to reside in Greater Vancouver, married her drummer, Ashwin Sood, in Jamaica in 1997. They had two daughters, born in 2002 and 2007, and divorced in 2008.

From 2009 to 2011, McLachlan was in a relationship with businessman Brett Wilson. From 2012 to 2015, she was in a relationship with former hockey star Geoff Courtnall.

In 2014, when asked what religion she practices, she answered, "I don't adhere to any particular religion. I view the concept of God as an energy that we all are part of and share. If I had any spiritual leanings, it would be towards Buddhism . . . I follow my own path."

== Awards and achievements ==
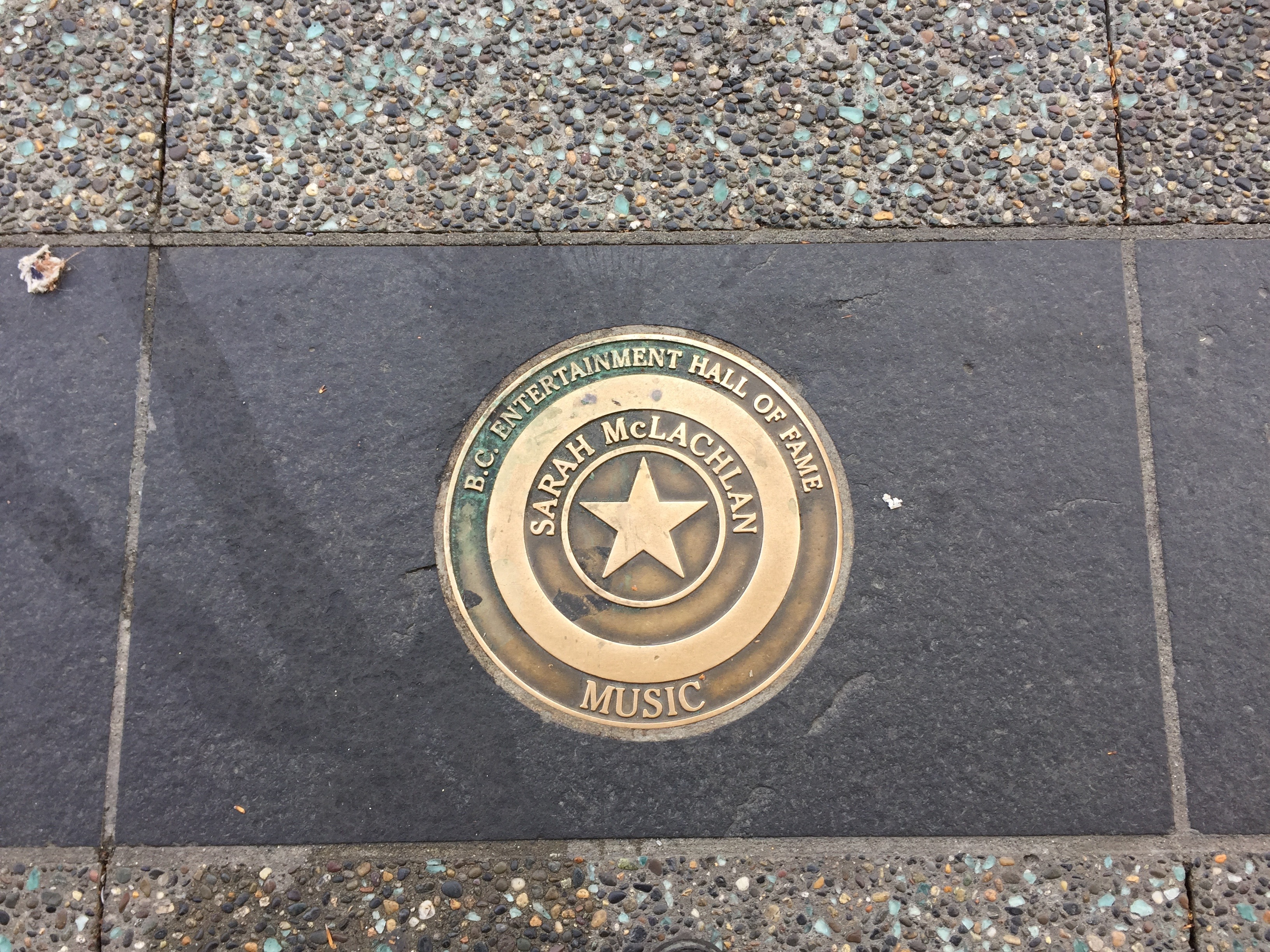
Sarah McLachlan recognized by BC Entertainment Hall of Fame in a sidewalk in downtown Vancouver

McLachlan has been nominated for 26 Juno Awards and won twelve. In 1992, her video for "Into the Fire" won the Juno for Best Video. In 1998, Surfacing won the award for Best Album, and "Building a Mystery" won Single of the Year. She won the awards for Best Female Vocalist and, with Pierre Marchand, Songwriter of the Year. Marchand also won the Best Producer award for "Building a Mystery". In 2000, McLachlan won the International Achievement Award. In 2004, she won Pop Album of the Year for Afterglow and shared the Songwriter of the Year award with Marchand for the singles "Fallen", "World on Fire", and "Stupid". In 2009, she was presented with the Juno Humanitarian Award. She won the Adult Contemporary Album of the Year award in 2015 for "Shine On" and the same award in 2017 for "Wonderland". At the 2017 ceremony, she was also inducted into the Canadian Music Hall of Fame.

McLachlan has been nominated for 14 Grammy Awards and has won three. She won Best Female Pop Vocal Performance in 1998 for "Building a Mystery" and again in 2000 for the live version of "I Will Remember You". At the 1998 ceremony, she also won the Grammy Award for Best Pop Instrumental Performance for "Last Dance". "Building a Mystery" was ranked No. 91 on VH1's 100 Greatest Songs of the 1990s.

In 1998, New York governor George Pataki awarded McLachlan the Elizabeth Cady Stanton Visionary Award for advancing the careers of women in music.

In 1999, she was appointed as an Officer of the Order of Canada in recognition of her successful recording career, the founding of Lilith Fair, and her charitable donations to women's shelters across Canada. In 2001, she was inducted into the Order of British Columbia. In 2002, she received the Queen Elizabeth II Golden Jubilee Medal and, in 2012, the Queen Elizabeth II Diamond Jubilee Medal. In 2015, she received the Governor General's Performing Arts Award for Lifetime Artistic Achievement, Canada's highest honour in the performing arts.

McLachlan has received honours from four academic institutions. She was recognized with an honorary degree from Emily Carr University of Art and Design in 2009, and with one from Simon Fraser University in 2011. She received an Honorary Doctor of Laws degree from the University of Alberta in 2013, and was named Honorary Fellow at Douglas College in 2025.

In 2012, McLachlan was inducted into Canada's Walk of Fame. In 2013, Kiwanis International presented McLachlan with the Kiwanis International World Service Medal in recognition of her founding the Sarah McLachlan School of Music, a free music school for at-risk youth in Vancouver, British Columbia.

McLachlan was awarded the Global Inspiration award at the 2018 SOCAN Awards "for her contributions to the music industry, for her profound impact on music education for Canadian youth through her School of Music, as well as for her acclaim as a songwriter in a career that's spanned 30 years".

In 2024, McLachlan was inducted into the Canadian Songwriters Hall of Fame. That year, Canada Post released a stamp in her honor.

McLachlan has won the Allan Slaight Humanitarian Spirit Award twice, once in 2011 and again in 2026. The award, presented by Canadian Music Week (now the Departure Festival), honors Canadian artists for their outstanding social activism and support of humanitarian causes.

== Philanthropy ==
=== Sarah McLachlan School of Music ===
Having noticed that music programs were being cut from school curricula, in 2002 McLachlan used proceeds from Lilith Fair to start a free music program for at-risk youth in urban Vancouver. In 2007, British Columbia's provincial government granted $500,000 in funding for the outreach program. Originating as "Sarah McLachlan Music Outreach," this program evolved into the Sarah McLachlan School of Music (SoM). SoM provides at-risk children who have limited opportunities for music education with free instruction in guitar, piano, percussion and choir composing, songwriting, stage production, voice, choir, music theory and new media.

The school is housed in a converted bowling alley, donated in 2011 by the Wolverton Foundation. In 2016, the school expanded to Edmonton, Alberta, operating from MacEwan University. In 2024, SoM opened a program space in Douglas College in New Westminster. These music schools have the same initiatives as the Vancouver school.

In the 2024/2025 school year, SoM provided group and private lessons to 1,754 students. Most students stay in SoM for 8 years, until they graduate from high school.

=== ASPCA and PETA ===
McLachlan supported the American Society for the Prevention of Cruelty to Animals by appearing in advertisements. In 2006, she filmed a two-minute advertisement for the organization, which featured her song "Angel". The advertisement's imagery of shelter animals, mixed with the soundtrack and McLachlan's simple appeal for donations, has raised $30 million for the ASPCA, which the organization used to air appeals in higher-profile prime-time ad slots. The ASPCA produced a new ad for the 2008 holiday season featuring McLachlan appealing for the ASPCA over her Wintersong performance of "Silent Night", and a new ad with her was released in January 2009 featuring the song "Answer". While the spots brought McLachlan an entirely new audience, she became concerned that she was being seen as a "sad artist"; to offset that, she began to parody herself in widely-viewed ads. During Super Bowl XLVIII on February 3, 2014, McLachlan parodied her ASPCA appeals in an Audi commercial featuring a "Doberhuahua" dog gnawing on the neck of her guitar, and again in a 2022 promotional spot for the shopping app Bolt. In return, Bolt donated $50,000 to the ASPCA. Another self-satirical Super Bowl ad, for Busch Light, aired during Super Bowl LVII on February 12, 2023.

In 2011, McLachlan wrote a private letter on behalf of PETA to Canada’s minister of international trade, urging him to take action in the World Trade Organization's hearings on Canada's seal hunt. In 2012, also on behalf of PETA, she wrote to then-Prime Minister Stephen Harper, asking him to end the seal hunt.

=== Other charitable contributions ===
McLachlan contributed the track "Hold On" to the 1993 AIDS-benefit album No Alternative, produced by the Red Hot Organization. She also performed at the Leonard Peltier Defense Fund Benefit Concert on February 12, 1997, and went on to release a cover version of "Unchained Melody" created in support of Peltier. It was later included on the album Rarities, B-Sides and Other Stuff Volume 2.

In early 2005, McLachlan took part in a star-studded tsunami disaster relief telethon on NBC. On January 29, McLachlan was a headliner for a benefit concert in Vancouver along with other Canadian superstars, such as Avril Lavigne and Bryan Adams. The show also featured a performance by the Sarah McLachlan Musical Outreach Choir & Percussion Ensemble, a children's choir and percussion band. Entitled One World: The Concert for Tsunami Relief, the concert raised approximately $3.6 million for several Canadian aid agencies working in south and southeast Asia.

On July 2, 2005, McLachlan participated in the Philadelphia installment of the Live 8 concerts, where she performed her hit "Angel" with Josh Groban. These concerts were intended to coincide with the G8 summit to put pressure on the leaders of the world's richest nations to fight poverty in Africa by cancelling debt.

In 2008, she donated a song to Aid Still Required's CD to assist with restoration efforts in Southeast Asia after the 2004 tsunami.

On November 30, 2012, McLachlan lent her support to Kate Winslet's Golden Hat Foundation, appearing with Tim Janis, Loreena McKennitt, Andrea Corr, Hayley Westenra, Sleepy Man Banjo Boys, Dawn Kenney, Jana Mashonee, and Amy Petty in "The American Christmas Carol" concert at Carnegie Hall. She performed at the same event, now named "Tim Janis' The American Christmas Carol", in 2015.

McLachlan is a member of the Canadian charity Artists Against Racism.

== Discography ==
=== Studio albums ===
- Touch (1988)
- Solace (1991)
- Fumbling Towards Ecstasy (1993)
- Surfacing (1997)
- Afterglow (2003)
- Wintersong (2006)
- Laws of Illusion (2010)
- Shine On (2014)
- Wonderland (2016)
- Better Broken (2025)
