= Pierre Marchand =

Canadian songwriter, musician and record producer

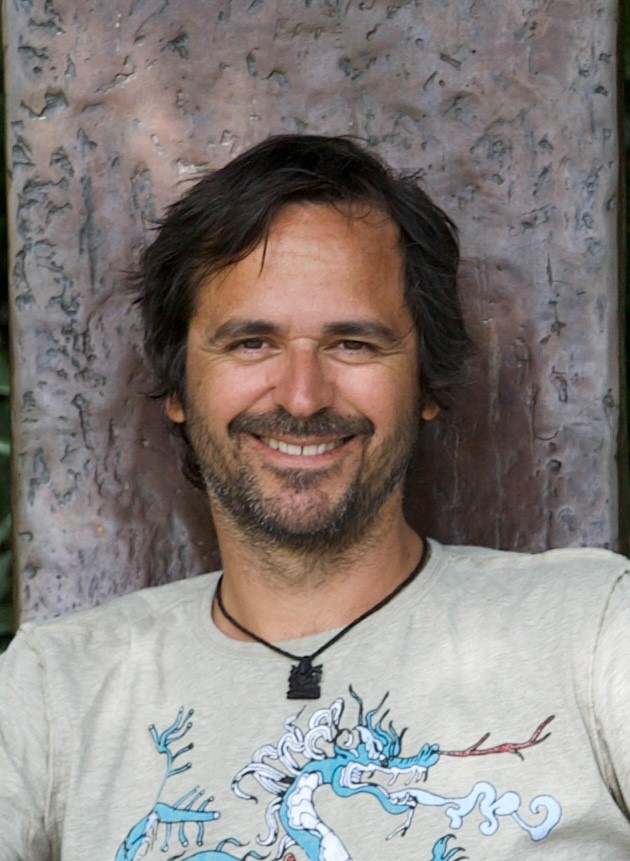

Background information
- Born: 1958 (age 67–68)
- Origin: Montreal, Quebec, Canada
- Occupations: Songwriter, producer

Pierre Marchand (born 1958) is a Canadian songwriter, musician and record producer.

Marchand is known for his ongoing collaboration with Sarah McLachlan, having produced all of her albums from Solace in 1991 through Wonderland in 2016. He also co-wrote several of McLachlan's singles, including "Building a Mystery", "Adia", "Into the Fire", and "Fumbling Towards Ecstasy".

Marchand has also worked with many other singer-songwriters, including Kate & Anna McGarrigle, Rufus Wainwright, Ron Sexsmith, Leigh Nash, Stevie Nicks, Daniel Lanois, The Devlins, Greg Keelor, Patty Larkin and Lhasa de Sela. He has been awarded the Juno Award for songwriting and producing, as well as a Felix Award for Producer of the Year.

In 2014, he translated several songs by Whitehorse into French for that band's EP Éphémère sans repère.

His recording studio Studio PM is located in Montreal.
