= Mother Mother discography =

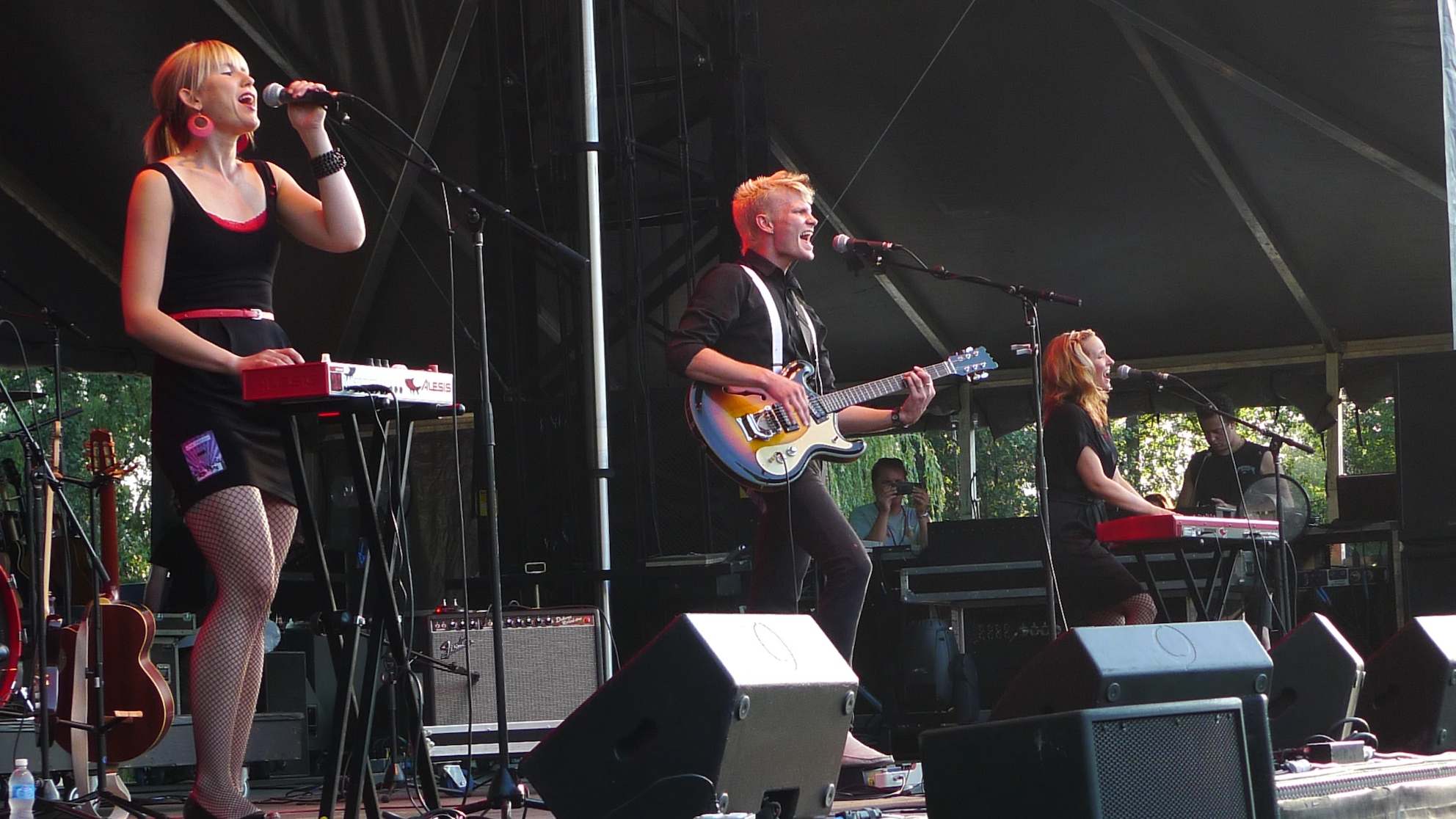
- Mother Mother performing in Deer Lake Park for British Columbia Day on August 3, 2009
- Studio albums: 11
- EPs: 2
- Demo albums: 1
- Live albums: 5
- Singles: 36
- Music videos: 35
- Guest appearances: 1
- Other charting and certified songs: 2

Canadian indie rock band Mother Mother has released eleven studio albums, four live albums, 34 singles, two extended plays (EPs), and 35 music videos. The band was formed in 2005 in Quadra Island, British Columbia and currently consists of Ryan Guldemond, Molly Guldemond, Jasmin Parkin, Ali Siadat, and Mike Young.

== Studio albums ==
| Title | Details | Peak chart positions | | | | |
| Title | Details | CAN | FIN | HUN Phys. | LTU | SCO |
|---|---|---|---|---|---|---|
| Mother | Released: 2005; Label: None | — | — | — | — | — |
| Touch Up | Released: February 27, 2007; Label: Last Gang | — | — | — | — | — |
| O My Heart | Released: September 16, 2008; Label: Last Gang | — | 29 | — | 7 | — |
| Eureka | Released: March 15, 2011; Label: Last Gang | 8 | — | — | — | — |
| The Sticks | Released: September 18, 2012; Label: Last Gang | 11 | — | — | — | — |
| Very Good Bad Thing | Released: November 4, 2014; Label: Island, Universal | 4 | — | — | — | — |
| No Culture | Released: February 10, 2017; Label: Island, Universal | 7 | — | — | — | — |
| Dance and Cry | Released: November 2, 2018; Label: Universal | 53 | — | — | — | — |
| Inside | Released: June 25, 2021; Label: Warner | 68 | — | — | — | — |
| Grief Chapter | Released: February 16, 2024; Label: Warner | — | — | 11 | — | 91 |
| Nostalgia | Released: June 6, 2025; Label: Warner, Parlophone | — | — | 23 | — | — |
"—" denotes a release that did not chart.

== Live albums ==
| Title | Album details |
|---|---|
| Live Off The Floor | Released: 4 February 2005; Label: CBC Studio One; Format: Digital download |
| iTunes Live From Montreal | Released: 8 November 2008; Label: Last Gang; Format: Digital download |
| No Culture (Live Sessions) | Released: July 7, 2017; Label: Island, Universal; Format: Digital download |
| O My Heart (Live Sessions) | Released: April 20, 2018; Label: Island, Universal; Format: Digital download |
| Live from Santiago de Compostela | Released: October 14, 2022; Label: Warner; Format: Digital download |

== Demo albums ==
| Title | Album details |
|---|---|
| DEMMOS | Released: 15 November 2024; Label: Last Gang; Format: Digital download |

== Extended plays ==
| Title | EP details |
|---|---|
| The Hayloft Arc EP | Released: 14 November 2022; Label: Warner; Format: 12" |
| Mother EP | Released: 27 September 2024; Label: Warner |

== Singles ==
| Title | Year | Peak chart positions | | | | | Certifications | Album |
| Title | Year | CAN | CAN Alt | CAN Rock | LTU | UK Indie. | Certifications | Album |
|---|---|---|---|---|---|---|---|---|
| "O My Heart" | 2008 | — | 24 | 41 | — | — | | O My Heart |
| "Body of Years" | 2009 | — | 12 | 28 | — | — | | O My Heart |
| "Hayloft" | 2009 | — | 43 | — | 26 | 8 | BPI: Gold; RIAA: Platinum | O My Heart |
| "The Stand" | 2011 | 76 | 3 | 23 | — | — | | Eureka |
| "Baby Don't Dance" | 2011 | — | 11 | 30 | — | — | | Eureka |
| "Simply Simple" | 2011 | — | 20 | 41 | — | — | | Eureka |
| "Bright Idea" | 2012 | — | — | — | — | — | | Non-album single |
| "Let's Fall in Love" | 2012 | — | 3 | 13 | — | — | | The Sticks |
| "Bit By Bit" | 2012 | — | 4 | 22 | — | — | MC: Gold | The Sticks |
| "Infinitesimal" | 2013 | — | 12 | 26 | — | — | | The Sticks |
| "Get Out the Way" | 2014 | — | 9 | 21 | — | — | | Very Good Bad Thing |
| "Monkey Tree" | 2014 | — | 9 | 15 | — | — | | Very Good Bad Thing |
| "Modern Love" | 2015 | — | 18 | 26 | — | — | | Very Good Bad Thing |
| "The Drugs" | 2016 | — | 1 | 4 | — | — | | No Culture |
| "Love Stuck" | 2017 | — | 14 | 14 | — | — | | No Culture |
| "Baby Boy" | 2017 | — | — | 38 | — | — | | No Culture |
| "Get Up" | 2018 | — | 1 | 7 | — | — | | Dance and Cry |
| "So Down" | 2018 | — | — | — | — | — | | Dance and Cry |
| "It's Alright" | 2018 | — | — | 13 | — | — | | Dance and Cry |
| "Give Me Back the Night" | 2019 | — | — | 17 | — | — | | Dance and Cry |
| "I Got Love" | 2021 | — | 2 | 11 | — | — | | Inside |
| "Stay Behind" | 2021 | — | — | — | — | — | | Inside |
| "Forgotten Souls" | 2021 | — | — | — | — | — | | Inside |
| "Pure Love" | 2021 | — | — | — | — | — | | Inside |
| "Sick of the Silence" | 2021 | — | 4 | 10 | — | — | | Inside |
| "Life" | 2021 | — | — | 41 | — | — | | Inside |
| "Hayloft II" | 2022 | 94 | — | 7 | — | — | MC: Platinum; BPI: Silver; RIAA: Gold | Inside |
| "Cry Christmas" | 2022 | — | — | — | — | — | | Non-album single |
| "Normalize" | 2023 | — | — | 24 | — | — | | Grief Chapter |
| "To My Heart" | 2023 | — | — | — | — | — | | Grief Chapter |
| "The Matrix" | 2023 | — | — | 12 | — | — | | Grief Chapter |
| "Nobody Escapes" | 2024 | — | — | — | — | — | | Grief Chapter |
| "Devil Town" (Cavetown cover) | 2024 | — | — | — | — | — | | Non-album singles |
| "Dirty Devil Town" (feat. Cavetown) | 2024 | — | — | — | — | — | | Non-album singles |
| "Make Believe" | 2025 | — | 11 | — | — | — | | Nostalgia |
| "Love to Death" | 2025 | — | — | — | — | — | | Nostalgia |
| "On and On (Song for Jasmin)" | 2025 | — | 19 | — | — | — | | Nostalgia |
"—" denotes a recording that did not chart or was not released in that territory.

== Other charting and certified songs ==
| Title | Year | Peak chart positions | | Certifications | Album |
| Title | Year | UK Indie. | LTU | Certifications | Album |
|---|---|---|---|---|---|
| "Verbatim" | 2005 | — | — | BPI: Silver | Mother |
| "Burning Pile" | 2008 | 36 | 74 | BPI: Silver | O My Heart |
"—" denotes a recording that did not chart or was not released in that territory.

== Guest appearances ==
| Year | Title | Other artist(s) | Album |
|---|---|---|---|
| 2008 | "Absinth Tears" | Josh Martinez | The World Famous Sex Buffet |

== Music videos ==
| Year | Title | Director |
|---|---|---|
| 2007 | "Touch Up" | |
| 2008 | "O My Heart" | Colin Minihan |
| 2009 | "Body Of Years" | Colin Minihan |
| 2009 | "Hayloft" | Hill Kourkoutis |
| 2011 | "The Stand" | John JP Poliquin |
| 2011 | "Baby Don't Dance" | Harv Glazer |
| 2012 | "Let's Fall In Love" | Kathi Prosser |
| 2012 | "Little Pistol" | Elia Petridis |
| 2012 | "Dread In My Heart" | |
| 2012 | "Waiting For The World To End" | |
| 2012 | "To The Wild" | Jeremy Page |
| 2012 | "The Sticks" | Chad VanGaalen |
| 2012 | "Love It Dissipates" | |
| 2012 | "Bit By Bit" | Kathi Prosser |
| 2013 | "Infinitesimal" | |
| 2014 | "Get Out The Way" | John Poliquin |
| 2014 | "Monkey Tree" | Lisa Mann |
| 2015 | "Modern Love" | Lisa Mann & Ray Dumas |
| 2016 | "The Drugs" | Emma Higgins |
| 2017 | "Love Stuck" | Lisa Mann |
| 2018 | "Get Up" | Connor McGuire |
| 2019 | "It's Alright" | |
| 2021 | "Stay Behind" | Lester Lyons-Hookman |
| 2021 | "I Got Love" | David McDonald |
| 2021 | "Forgotten Souls" | Sterling Larose |
| 2021 | "Pure Love" | Lester Lyons-Hookham |
| 2021 | "Sick Of The Silence" | Lester Lyons-Hookham |
| 2021 | "The Knack" | Shannon More O’Ferrall |
| 2021 | "Weep" | Rich Smith & Ryan Guldemond |
| 2021 | "Life" | Sterling Larose |
| 2022 | "Hayloft I" | Emma Higgins |
| 2022 | "Hayloft II" | Emma Higgins |
| 2023 | "Normalize" | Colin Minihan |
| 2023 | "The Matrix" | Sterling Larose |
| 2024 | "Nobody Escapes" | Stefano Bertelli |
| 2024 | "Explode!" | |
| 2025 | "FINGER" | Sterling Larose |
