= CASBY Awards =

Former Canadian music awards

The CASBY Awards were a Canadian awards ceremony for independent and alternative music, presented annually by Toronto, Ontario radio station CFNY, currently branded as 102.1 The Edge. CASBY is an acronym for Canadian Artists Selected By You.

The awards were first presented in 1981 under the name U-Knows, a pun on Canada's mainstream Juno Awards. The concept was developed by David Marsden, the program director at CFNY at the time, when he heard the Juno nominations announced on CBC Radio, and included was Long John Baldry — who was newly resident in Canada but had already been in the music business for almost 20 years — as most promising vocalist.

They were renamed the CASBYs in 1985, after a listener contest. The 1985 ceremony, hosted by Carole Pope and Paul Shaffer, also marked the first time that the awards were broadcast nationally by CBC Television. In the first year, voter ballots were distributed exclusively by the Canadian music magazine Graffiti. In later years the awards expanded the distribution, printing ballots in a number of major market daily newspapers across Canada.

The 1987 ceremony featured a rare public performance by XTC, although their performance was videotaped in advance of the ceremony. That year's awards were also marred by several organizational snafus, including the wrong winner being initially announced for Album of the Year.

The award's bid for national prominence faltered in the late 1980s, particularly after CFNY's short-lived shift to a more mainstream music format also affected public perception of the awards' identity. During that era, some alienated listeners even picketed the awards ceremony. Beginning in 1993 the awards were pared down to just three categories, and after 1996, amid a sense that the awards had effectively lost their purpose, the awards were discontinued.

They were then revived in 2002, and were presented each year until 2017.

== Winners ==
=== 1980s ===
==== 1981 ====
- Album of the Year: Teenage Head, Frantic City
- Single of the Year: Martha and the Muffins, "Echo Beach"
- Group of the Year: Teenage Head
- Female Vocalist of the Year: Carole Pope (Rough Trade)
- Male Vocalist of the Year: B.B. Gabor

==== 1982 ====
- Album of the Year: Bruce Cockburn, Inner City Front
- Single of the Year: Blue Peter, "Chinese Graffiti"
- Group of the Year: Martha and the Muffins
- Female Vocalist of the Year: Carole Pope (Rough Trade)
- Male Vocalist of the Year: B.B. Gabor

==== 1983 ====
- Album of the Year: Rough Trade, Shaking the Foundations
- Single of the Year: The Payolas, "Eyes of a Stranger"
- Group of the Year: Spoons
- Female Vocalist of the Year: Carole Pope (Rough Trade)
- Male Vocalist of the Year: Leroy Sibbles

==== 1984 ====
- Album of the Year: Parachute Club, Parachute Club
- Single of the Year: Men Without Hats, "The Safety Dance"
- Group of the Year: Parachute Club
- Female Vocalist of the Year: Lorraine Segato (Parachute Club)
- Male Vocalist of the Year: Paul Humphrey (Blue Peter)

==== 1985 ====
- Album of the Year: Parachute Club, At the Feet of the Moon
- Single of the Year: Spoons, "Tell No Lies"
- Group of the Year: Parachute Club
- Female Vocalist of the Year: Jane Siberry
- Male Vocalist of the Year: Bruce Cockburn
- Most Promising Male Vocalist: Gowan
- Most Promising Non-Recording Group: Chalk Circle
- Most Promising Group of the Year: Pukka Orchestra
- Best International Album: U2, The Unforgettable Fire

==== 1986 ====
- Album of the Year: Jane Siberry, The Speckless Sky
- Single of the Year: Images in Vogue, "In the House"
- Group of the Year: Images in Vogue
- Female Vocalist of the Year: Luba
- Male Vocalist of the Year: Bruce Cockburn
- Most Promising Female Vocalist: Dianne Bos
- Most Promising Group: Chalk Circle
- International Album of the Year: Peter Gabriel, So

==== 1987 ====
- Album of the Year: Parachute Club, Small Victories
- Single of the Year: Luba, "How Many (Rivers To Cross)"
- Group of the Year: Parachute Club
- Female Vocalist of the Year: Luba
- Male Vocalist of the Year: Corey Hart
- Most Promising Artist: Colin James
- Most Promising Group: The Pursuit of Happiness
- Best Non-Recording Act: Basic English
- International Album of the Year: Paul Simon, Graceland

==== 1988 ====
- Album of the Year: Robbie Robertson, Robbie Robertson
- Single of the Year: Blue Rodeo, "Try"
- Group of the Year: Blue Rodeo
- Female Vocalist of the Year: k.d. lang
- Male Vocalist of the Year: Robbie Robertson
- Most Promising Group: The Razorbacks (defeating The Tragically Hip)
- Most Promising Artist: Andrew Cash
- International Album of the Year: INXS, Kick
- Best R&B/Reggae Recording: Sattalites
- Best Jazz Recording: Manteca, Fire Me Up
- Producer of the Year: Daniel Lanois, Robbie Robertson
- Video of the Year: Blue Rodeo, "Try"
- Best Independent Video: The Shuffle Demons - "Out of My House", "Roach"
- Best Independent Artist: The Shuffle Demons
- Best Album Art: The Grapes of Wrath, Treehouse

==== 1989 ====
- Album of the Year: Jeff Healey, See the Light
- Single of the Year: Jeff Healey, "Angel Eyes"
- Group of the Year: Blue Rodeo
- Female Vocalist of the Year: k.d. lang
- Male Vocalist of the Year: Jeff Healey
- Most Promising Group: Sons of Freedom
- International Album of the Year: Fine Young Cannibals, The Raw & the Cooked

=== 1990s ===
==== 1990 ====
- Album of the Year: The Tragically Hip, Up to Here
- Single of the Year: The Tragically Hip, "New Orleans Is Sinking"
- Group of the Year: The Tragically Hip
- Female Vocalist of the Year: Margo Timmins (Cowboy Junkies)
- Male Vocalist of the Year: Gordon Downie (The Tragically Hip)
- Most Promising Group: Skydiggers
- Dance/Rap Song of the Year: Maestro Fresh Wes, "Let Your Backbone Slide"
- International Album of the Year: Sinéad O'Connor, I Do Not Want What I Haven't Got

==== 1991 ====
- Favourite Album: Crash Test Dummies, The Ghosts That Haunt Me
- Favourite Song: Crash Test Dummies, "Superman's Song"
- Favourite Group/Artist: Barenaked Ladies
- Most Promising Female Vocalist: Sarah McLachlan
- Most Promising Male Vocalist: Brad Roberts (Crash Test Dummies)
- Next Big Thing: Bourbon Tabernacle Choir
- Most Outstanding Musician: Bruce Cockburn

==== 1992 ====
- Favourite Album: The Grapes of Wrath, These Days
- Favourite Song: The Grapes of Wrath, "I Am Here"
- Favourite Group/Artist: Barenaked Ladies
- Favourite Female Vocalist: Sarah McLachlan
- Favourite Male Vocalist: Gordon Downie (The Tragically Hip)
- Favourite Debut Album: Barenaked Ladies, Gordon
- Favourite Live Act: Barenaked Ladies
- Favourite Writer/Lyricists: Jim Cuddy and Greg Keelor, Blue Rodeo
- Favourite New Group/Artist from Central Canada: Moxy Früvous
- Favourite New Group/Artist from Eastern Canada: Sloan
- Favourite New Group/Artist from Western Canada: Pure
- Favourite Reggae/Ska Group/Artist: King Apparatus
- Favourite Music Producer: Michael Phillip Wojewoda, Gordon
- Special Achievement Award: Teenage Head

==== 1993 ====
- Favourite Song: 13 Engines, "More"
- Favourite New Artist/Group: Universal Honey
- Favourite Release: Doughboys, Crush

==== 1994 ====
- Single of the Year: Doughboys, Shine
- Favourite New Album:
- Favourite New Song:
- Favourite New Artist: Treble Charger

==== 1995 ====
- Favourite New Album: Our Lady Peace, Naveed
- Favourite New Song: Our Lady Peace, "Naveed"
- Favourite New Artist: Our Lady Peace

==== 1996 ====
- Favourite New Release: I Mother Earth, Scenery and Fish
- Favourite New Song: I Mother Earth, "One More Astronaut"
- Favourite New Artist: Limblifter

=== 2000s ===
==== 2002 ====
- Favourite New Artist: Sam Roberts
- Favourite New Single: Treble Charger, "Hundred Million"
- Favourite New Album: Our Lady Peace, Gravity
- Favourite New Video: Simple Plan, I'm Just a Kid
- Favourite New Indie Release: Not By Choice — Maybe One Day
- Lifetime Achievement Award: Rheostatics

==== 2003 ====
- Favourite New Artist: Three Days Grace
- Favourite New Single: Billy Talent, "Try Honesty"
- Favourite New Album: Sam Roberts, We Were Born in a Flame
- Favourite New Indie Release: The Salads, Fold A to B
- Lifetime Achievement Award: The Pursuit of Happiness

==== 2004 ====
- Favourite New Artist: The Trews
- Favourite New Single: Billy Talent, "River Below"
- Favourite New Album: Billy Talent, Billy Talent
- NXNE Favourite Indie Band: Alexisonfire

==== 2005 ====
- Favourite New Artist: Arcade Fire
- Favourite New Single: Bedouin Soundclash, "When the Night Feels My Song"
- Favourite New Album: Arcade Fire, Funeral
- NXNE Favourite New Indie Release: BOY, Every Page You Turn

==== 2006 ====
- Favourite New Artist: City and Colour
- Favourite New Single: Billy Talent, "Devil in a Midnight Mass"
- Favourite New Album: Billy Talent, Billy Talent II
- NXNE Favourite New Indie Release: Alexisonfire, Crisis

==== 2007 ====
- Favourite New Artist: Attack in Black
- Favourite New Single: Alexisonfire, "Boiled Frogs"
- Favourite New Album: Finger Eleven, Them vs. You vs. Me
- NXNE Favourite New Indie Release: Attack in Black, Marriage

==== 2008 ====
- Favourite New Artist: Ubiquitous Synergy Seeker
- Favourite New Single: Ubiquitous Synergy Seeker, "Hollow Point Sniper Hyperbole"
- Favourite New Album: Tokyo Police Club, Elephant Shell
- NXNE Favourite New Indie Release: City and Colour, Bring Me Your Love

==== 2009 ====
- Favourite New Artist: Arkells
- Favourite New Single: City and Colour, "Sleeping Sickness"
- Favourite New Album: Metric, Fantasies
- NXNE Favourite New Indie Release: Metric, Fantasies

==== 2010 ====
- Favourite New Album: Three Days Grace, Life Starts Now
- Favourite New Artist: Hollerado
- Favourite New Single: Alexisonfire, "The Northern"
- NXNE Favourite New Indie Release: Tokyo Police Club, Champ
- Favourite Edge Session: Silversun Pickups

==== 2011 ====
- Favourite New Album: The Sheepdogs, Learn & Burn
- Favourite New Artist: The Sheepdogs
- Favourite New Single: City and Colour, "Fragile Bird"
- NXNE Favourite New Indie Release: The Sheepdogs, Learn & Burn
- Favourite Edge Session: Mumford & Sons

==== 2012 ====
- Favourite New Album: Big Wreck, Albatross
- Favourite New Artist: Monster Truck
- Favourite New Single: Big Wreck, "Albatross"
- NXNE Favourite New Indie Release: Metric, Synthetica
- Favourite Edge Session: Metric

==== 2013 ====
- Favourite New Album: Mother Mother, The Sticks
- Favourite New Artist: Walk Off the Earth
- Favourite New Single: City and Colour, "Thirst"
- Favourite Sugar Beach Session: Hollerado

==== 2014 ====
- Favourite New Album: Arkells, High Noon
- Favourite New Artist: July Talk
- Favourite New Single: Ubiquitous Synergy Seeker, "Advanced Basics"
- Favourite Sugar Beach Session: City and Colour

==== 2015 ====
- Favourite New Record: Mother Mother, Very Good Bad Thing
- Molson Canadian Favourite New Artist: Coleman Hell
- Favourite New Song: Ubiquitous Synergy Seeker, "Shipwreck"
- Favourite Sugar Beach Session: Metric

==== 2016 ====
- Favourite New Record: Billy Talent, Afraid of Heights
- Molson Canadian Favourite New Artist: Banners
- Favourite New Song: July Talk, "Push + Pull"
- Favourite Sugar Beach Session: Arkells

==== 2017 ====
- Favourite New Record: Mother Mother, No Culture
- Molson Canadian Favourite New Artist: Ascot Royals
- Favourite New Song: Arkells, "Knocking at the Door"
- Favourite Sugar Beach Session: Hollerado
