= Guldemond =

Guldemond is a surname. Notable people with the surname include:

- Chas Guldemond (born 1987), American snowboarder
- Molly Guldemond (born 1983), Canadian musician, sister to Ryan Guldemond
- Ryan Guldemond (born 1986), Canadian musician
