= Now and Again (The Grapes of Wrath album) =

Studio album by the Grapes of Wrath
- Released: July 20, 1989
- Recorded: 1988–1989
- Genres: Alternative rock, pop rock, folk rock
- Length: 42:19
- Label: Nettwerk
- Producer: Anton Fier

The Grapes of Wrath chronology
Treehouse (1987)	Now and Again (1989)	These Days (1991)

Singles from Now and Again
- 1. "All the Things I Wasn't" Released: 1989; 2. "Do You Want to Tell Me?" Released: 1989; 3. "What Was Going Through My Head" Released: 1990; 4. "The Most" Released: 1990

Professional ratings
Review scores
Source	Rating
AllMusic	link

Now and Again is an album by Canadian band the Grapes of Wrath, released in 1989. It was the band's first album to feature new member Vince Jones on keyboards. The album was produced by Anton Fier and was recorded in an old (and supposedly haunted) church in Woodstock, New York. Guest musicians included Chuck Leavell, Sneaky Pete Kleinow and Jane Scarpantoni.

Now and Again was certified Platinum in Canada and is the band's most commercially successful album to date. The album contained one of the band's biggest hit singles, "All the Things I Wasn't". Now and Again was the 13th best-selling Cancon album in Canada of 1989.

In Chart magazine's 2000 reader poll of the Best Canadian Albums of All Time, Now and Again ranked in 27th place.

For the singles "What Was Going Through My Head" and "Do You Want To Tell Me", the b-sides were songs recorded on CBC Radio program Brave New Waves. One was an acoustic version of the song "Backward Town", and the other was a cover of Paul McCartney's "Let Me Roll It".

== Songs ==
Tom Hooper has stated that "What Was Going Through My Head" is about when Tom took four handfuls of magic mushrooms before a Pink Floyd concert, and he was so freaked out during the first song that he ran out of the stadium back into his hotel room.

== Track listing ==
All songs composed by Chris Hooper, Kevin Kane, Tom Hooper, and Vincent Jones except tracks 4, 5 & 10, composed by Chris Hooper, Kevin Kane, Tom Hooper.

1. "All the Things I Wasn't" – 2:17
2. "What Was Going Through My Head" – 2:47
3. "Do You Want to Tell Me?" – 3:34
4. "The Most" – 3:52
5. "I'm Gone" – 4:08
6. "Blind" – 4:21
7. "Stay" – 3:49
8. "I Can Tell" – 3:39
9. "Not the Way It Is" – 2:52
10. "Hiding" – 4:27
11. "The Time is Here" – 3:03
12. "...But I Guess We'll Never Know" – 3:30
