= Nostalgia (Mother Mother album) =

Studio album by Mother Mother
- Released: June 6, 2025
- Labels: Parlophone; Warner
- Producers: Ryan Guldemond; Jason Van Poederooyen

Mother Mother chronology
Mother EP (2024)	Nostalgia (2025)

Singles from Nostalgia
- 1. "Make Believe" Released: March 14, 2025; 2. "Love to Death" Released: April 25, 2025; 3. "Finger" Released: May 23, 2025

Nostalgia is the tenth studio album by the Canadian indie rock band Mother Mother. It was released on June 6, 2025 by Parlophone and Warner Records as part of the band's 20th anniversary.

According to frontman Ryan Guldemond, the goal when creating Nostalgia was to embody a childlike creativity which he believes often becomes elusive later in life, stating each creative choice was evaluated by its emotional impact.

Ryan Guldemond described "Make Believe" by stating he indulged a bit in his own life-philosophy on the track, mentioning "magical thinking, interconnection, cosmic gallivanting."

One song from the album, "Love to Death", was previously leaked online in 2009, becoming a popular song amongst fans of the group.

Ryan Guldemond has described "Finger" as the long-lost sibling of "Verbatim", a song from Mother Mother's debut studio album Touch Up (2007). Guldemond continued by stating that the song delves into perceived double standards within broader society.

== Reception ==
With the release of "Make Believe", the first single from the album, responses included Melodic Magazine describing the single as "[pushing] boundaries musically and aesthetically" and Billboard describing it as "an energetic ode to fantasy and divinity, with a slightly sinister edge", and saying it would fit in the American thriller drama series Yellowjackets.

Make Believe debuted on the Canada Modern Rock Airplay chart at 39 for the week of March 29, 2025, later moving up throughout the weeks until peaking at 11 for the week of June 7. Make Believe continued to stay on the chart up through the week of August 9, 2025 for a total of 20 weeks.

== Track listing ==
All tracks are written by Ryan Guldemond.

No.	Title	Length
1.	"Love to Death"	3:33
2.	"Make Believe"	2:59
3.	"Station Wagon"	2:54
4.	"On and On (Song for Jasmin)"	2:31
5.	"Better of Me"	2:44
6.	"Namaste"	2:50
7.	"Finger"	2:59
8.	"Me & You"	2:13
9.	"Little Mistake"	3:08
10.	"Mano a Mano"	3:13
11.	"Nostalgia"	4:07
12.	"To Regret"	3:34
Total length:		36:46

== Personnel ==
Credits adapted from Tidal.

=== Mother Mother ===
- Molly Guldemond – vocals, synthesizer
- Ryan Guldemond – lead vocals, guitar, production, engineering
- Jasmin Parkin – keyboards, vocals
- Ali Siadat – drums
- Mike Young – bass

=== Additional contributors ===
- Jason Van Poederooyen – production, mixing, engineering (all tracks), additional keyboards (tracks 2, 5, 7, 9, 10)
- Philip Shaw Bova – mastering
- Justin Gray – immersive mixing
- Annie Kennedy – engineering assistance
- Kris Fearon – engineering assistance
- Stefan Nowarre – editing
- Flavio Cirillo – drum technician

== Charts ==
Chart performance for Nostalgia
Chart (2025)	Peak position
Hungarian Physical Albums (MAHASZ)	23
