= O My Heart =

2008 album by Mother Mother

Studio album by Mother Mother
- Released: September 16, 2008
- Genre: Indie rock
- Length: 47:19
- Label: Last Gang Records
- Producer: Howard Redekopp

Mother Mother chronology
Touch Up (2007)	O My Heart (2008)	Eureka (2011)

Professional ratings
Review scores
Source	Rating
Music Emissions	4.5/5 stars
PopMatters	8/10 stars
Sputnikmusic	4.5
Ultimate Guitar	7.3

O My Heart (Stylised as "O My ♡") is the second album by Vancouver-based indie rock band Mother Mother, released in 2008. Videos for the songs "O My Heart", "Body of Years", and "Hayloft" were released. In late 2020, "Hayloft", "Arms Tonite", "Wrecking Ball" and “Burning Pile” went viral on the video-sharing app TikTok.

"Hayloft II", a sequel to "Hayloft", was released on the deluxe edition of the band's 2021 album Inside. The album at one point included a bonus track called “Heart Heavy” which was originally only available via purchase of the whole album on iTunes.

== Background ==
During extensive touring in support of Mother Mother's previous album, Touch Up, they played some new songs live that would later appear on O My Heart.

O My Heart features a more rock-oriented sound, due to the band gaining two more members just before Touch Up's release, being drummer Ali Siadat, and bassist Jeremy Page.

Shortly before the album's September 2008 release, a founding member, Debra-Jean Creelman, left the band, being replaced with Jasmin Parkin.

== Track listing ==
All songs written by Ryan Guldemond.

O My Heart track list
No.	Title	Length
1.	"O My Heart"	3:31
2.	"Burning Pile"	4:22
3.	"Body of Years"	4:38
4.	"Try to Change"	4:02
5.	"Wisdom"	3:28
6.	"Body"	3:34
7.	"Ghosting"	4:46
8.	"Hayloft"	3:02
9.	"Wrecking Ball"	3:14
10.	"Arms Tonite"	3:37
11.	"Miles"	3:16
12.	"Sleep Awake"	5:47
13.	"Heart Heavy" (bonus track)	4:04
Total length:		47:19

== Personnel ==
=== Mother Mother ===
- Ryan Guldemond – guitar, vocals
- Molly Guldemond – vocals, keyboard
- Debra-Jean Creelman – keyboard, vocals
- Ali Siadat – drums
- Jeremy Page – bass, clarinet, bass clarinet, tenor sax, backing vocals

=== Additional personnel ===
- Peggy Lee – cello
- Tyson Naylor – organ, piano
- JP Carter – trumpet
- Shawn Penner – synthesizer, backing vocals
- Rebecca Whitling – violin

=== Production ===
- Howard Redekopp – producer, engineer, mixer
- Steve Hall – mastering
- Molly Guldemond – artwork, design
