= Dan Fraser =

Canadian businessman

- Born: Castor, Alberta, Canada
- Occupations: President, Nettwerk Management

Dan Fraser (born c. 1963 in Castor, Alberta) is the president of Nettwerk Management and one of four co-founders of the Nettwerk Music Group, based in Vancouver, British Columbia, Canada. The Nettwerk Music Group is now an international organization, with offices in London, Boston, New York, Nashville, Los Angeles, and Vancouver. Fraser began working with Terry McBride, Ric Arboit, and Mark Jowett in 1988.

Fraser was raised in Edmonton, Alberta, and currently resides in West Vancouver, BC. Fraser started out in the music business on the road touring at 17 years of age, and in 1988 he began working with McBride, Arboit, and Jowett, later creating the Nettwerk Management branch of the Nettwerk Music Group. As President, Fraser works with all artists on the Nettwerk Management roster and oversees artist managers, company employees, financial operations, and management deal negotiations and closings. Additionally, Fraser manages all aspects of the touring careers of Juno- and Grammy award-winning clients on the Nettwerk roster. He also contributes to the overall strategic development of the Nettwerk Music Group with the other 3 co-founders.

== Lilith Fair ==
In the late 1990s, Dan partnered with McBride, Marty Diamond, and Sarah McLachlan to co-found the all-female Lilith Fair tour. For 4 consecutive years, Lilith Fair showcased a wide variety of female-fronted acts to audiences throughout North America.

In April 2009, it was announced that Lilith Fair would be returning in Summer 2010.

== Philanthropic work ==
Fraser has executive produced the 2002 BC Cancer Benefit and The 2005 Tsunami Benefit, both in Vancouver. Fraser has sat on several boards including the 2007 Memorial Cup in Vancouver and the 2006 World Junior Hockey Championships held in British Columbia. Fraser is also an active board member for the Sarah McLachlan Music Outreach program.

== 2010 Olympics ==
Fraser served on the ceremonies production team for the 2010 Winter Olympics in Vancouver. This team was responsible for the production, design, scenic, and artist elements around the opening and closing ceremonies, as well as the medal presentations for the 2010 Olympic Winter Games in Vancouver.
