= These Days (The Grapes of Wrath album) =

Studio album by the Grapes of Wrath
- Released: 1991
- Recorded: December 1990 – February 1991
- Genre: Alternative rock
- Length: 54:11
- Label: Nettwerk
- Producer: John Leckie

The Grapes of Wrath chronology
Now and Again (1989)	These Days (1991)	Seems Like Fate 1984–1992 (1994)

Singles from These Days
- 1. "I Am Here" Released: July 1991; 2. "You May Be Right" Released: October 1991; 3. "A Fishing Tale" Released: February 1992

These Days is an album by Canadian rock band the Grapes of Wrath, released in 1991.

Produced by John Leckie and mixed by Gareth Cousins, the album found the band attempting to expand their traditional folk rock sound in a more guitar-heavy alternative rock direction.

Although the album sold well, and spawned the hit singles "You May Be Right" and "I Am Here", it was not as popular with critics as its predecessor, 1989's Now and Again. Guest musicians on the album included Phil Comparelli and members of XTC (credited as the Dukes of Stratosphear).

To promote the third single "A Fishing Tale", the band held a contest on Canadian music video channel MuchMusic entitled "Fishing with the Grapes of Wrath". To be eligible to win, viewers had to submit the name of the magazine that Tom Hooper picks up in the video to win a fishing trip with Tom Hooper, Vincent Jones and MuchMusic VJ Terry David Mulligan.

These Days peaked at #19 on the RPM Canadian Albums Chart. The single "I Am Here" appeared on the RPM Top Singles chart in September 1991.

These Days was the band's final album of new material for almost a decade. Following the album, Kevin Kane left the band, citing creative differences. The remaining members carried on under the new name Ginger.

Kane and Tom Hooper reunited in 2000 to record Field Trip under the Grapes of Wrath name, although the other band members did not participate in that project.

== Video collections ==
In 1992, the band released a VHS video collection entitled Those Days. The collection comprises all of their promotional videos, with the exception of "A Fishing Tale", since that video was released just after the release of this collection. It begins with the audience from a concert at Massey Hall in Toronto screaming in unison, "The Grapes of Wrath present Those Days". Between each video, there is rare footage of the band, some when they are children.

The collection was re-released on DVD in 2001 under the name Seems Like Fate - The Videos, along with "A Fishing Tale", all of the Ginger videos and Kevin Kane's solo video for "The Sinking Song". The DVD does not include any material from the 2000 reunion record Field Trip.

== Track listing ==
All music written and composed by Chris Hooper, Kevin Kane, Tom Hooper, and Vincent Jones.

1. "Away" – 4:08
2. "You May Be Right" – 5:10
3. "Consequences" – 4:17
4. "I Can't Find My Home" – 3:58
5. "Days" – 4:54
6. "I Am Here" – 4:25
7. "No Reason" – 2:22
8. "Travelin'" – 5:19
9. "A Fishing Tale" – 4:48
10. "Thru to You" – 4:15
11. "Now" – 3:46
12. "Miracle" – 6:23

== Singles ==
1. "I Am Here" (with B-Sides: All The Time & See Emily Play)
2. "You May Be Right" (with B-Side: Down So Close)
3. "A Fishing Tale (Single Edit)" (with B-Side: Piece Of Mind (Live))

All songs mixed by Gareth Cousins.
