= High Road (The Grapes of Wrath album) =

Studio album by The Grapes of Wrath
- Released: March 19, 2013
- Recorded: 2012
- Genre: Folk rock
- Label: Aporia Records
- Producer: Darryl Neudorf

The Grapes of Wrath chronology
Singles (2012)	High Road (2013)

High Road is an album by Canadian folk rock band The Grapes of Wrath, released March 19, 2013 on Aporia Records. It is the band's first album of new material since Field Trip in 2000, and the first to feature all three of the band's original members since 1991's These Days. The tracks "Good To See You" and "Take On The Day" had previously appeared on the band's compilation album Singles, released in 2012.

== Track listing ==
1. "Good to See You"
2. "Isn't There"
3. "Mexico"
4. "Paint You Blue"
5. "I'm Lost (I Miss You)"
6. "Take on the Day"
7. "Broken"
8. "Make It OK"
9. "Picnic"
10. "None Too Soon"
11. "Waiting to Fly"
12. "Sad Melodies"
