= Inside (Mother Mother album) =

2021 album by Mother Mother

Studio album by Mother Mother
- Released: June 25, 2021
- Genre: Indie rock
- Length: 48:01
- Label: Warner Music Canada
- Producer: Ryan Guldemond, Howard Redekopp

Mother Mother chronology
Dance and Cry (2018)	Inside (2021)	Grief Chapter (2024)

Singles from Inside
- 1. "I Got Love / Stay Behind" Released: March 5, 2021; 2. "Forgotten Souls / Pure Love" Released: April 30, 2021; 3. "Sick of the Silence" Released: June 11, 2021; 4. "Life" Released: October 29, 2021

Professional ratings
Review scores
Source	Rating
Exclaim!	7/10 stars

Inside is the eighth album by Vancouver-based indie rock band Mother Mother, released on June 25, 2021. It was produced by Ryan Guldemond and Howard Redekopp. It is a concept album dealing with themes of isolation and self-love during the COVID-19 pandemic.

On December 1, 2021, Mother Mother announced a deluxe edition of Inside, which would include a sequel to "Hayloft" titled "Hayloft II." The deluxe was released on January 28, 2022.

== Background and recording ==
The band intended for 2020 to be a hiatus year, but decided to write an album during the COVID-19 pandemic lockdown. In an interview, Ryan Guldemond said "It's an album that we could only make once, during a very unique time in the world, and a focused response to that moment ... it’s an important album in our discography. I'm really happy we had the opportunity to chronicle this time in the world with a body of work." Ideas for the album were shared over phone calls and e-mail and members would record in the studio alone due to Canada's COVID-19 restrictions.

Guldemond states that the album was inspired by the isolation he experienced during the pandemic, wanting to theme the lyrics around "going within to understand oneself better, to be better." The album's title refers to both Canada's stay-at-home orders and "going inside of oneself." Guldemond imagined a fusion of industrial and dystopian sounds combined with alternative and indie rock. While beginning to write the album, Guldemond took voice notes during his walks, including the audio of Vancouver's 7:00 p.m. healthcare salute included in the first, second, and final songs of the album.

The band considers Inside a continuation of their 2018 album, Dance and Cry.

== Track listing ==
All tracks are written by Ryan Guldemond, except where noted

No.	Title	Writer(s)	Length
1.	"Seven"		2:08
2.	"Two"	R. Guldemond, Molly Guldemond	2:37
3.	"Sick of the Silence"		3:08
4.	"Forgotten Souls"	R. Guldemond, Andy McNutt	2:55
5.	"Pure Love"		3:30
6.	"Weep"		3:27
7.	"I Got Love"		2:52
8.	"Stay Behind"		5:06
9.	"The Knack"	R. Guldemond, Raileen Cox, Susie McGregor	2:59
10.	"Girl Alone"		3:24
11.	"Like a Child"		2:32
12.	"Breathe"		2:00
13.	"Until It Doesn't Hurt"		2:55
14.	"Inside"		8:28
Total length:			48:01

Deluxe edition
No.	Title	Length
15.	"Life"	3:06
16.	"Hayloft II"	3:35
17.	"All the Dying"	3:15
18.	"Frying Pan"	2:09
19.	"Conversations"	2:20
20.	"Turpentine"	1:34
21.	"Like a Child (Piano Demo)"	3:37

== Personnel ==
- Ryan Guldemond – guitar and vocals
- Molly Guldemond – vocals and synth
- Jasmin Parkin – keyboard and vocals
- Ali Siadat – drums
- Mike Young – bass

== Charts ==
Chart (2018)	Peak position
Canadian Albums (Billboard)	53

=== Singles ===
Year	Song	Chart peak			Certifications
Year	Song	CAN	CAN Alt	CAN Rock	Certifications
2021	"I Got Love"	2	11	—	
2021	"Stay Behind"	—	—	—	
2021	"Forgotten Souls"	7	—	—	
2021	"Pure Love"	—	—	—	
2021	"Sick of the Silence"	4	10	—	
2021	"Life"	—	41	—	
2022	"Hayloft II"	—	—	94	MC: Gold
