= Mother EP =

Indie rock extended play by Mother Mother

EP by Mother Mother
- Released: September 27, 2024
- Genre: Indie rock
- Length: 15:58
- Label: Last Gang Records, MNRK Records
- Producer: Ryan Guldemond

Mother Mother chronology
Grief Chapter (2024)	Mother EP (2024)	Nostalgia (2025)

Mother EP is an indie rock extended play (EP) by Vancouver-based band Mother Mother. Released on September 27, 2024, under Last Gang Records and MNRK Records, the Mother EP features seven tracks originally released in 2005's Mother. Four of the tracks on the EP, "Fat Kids", "Babies", "Mamma Told Me", and "Home Recording", were unavailable on streaming services prior to its release.

At the time of its release, incorrect versions of the tracks "Mamma Told Me" and "Home Recording" were erroneously uploaded to streaming platforms. "Mamma Told Me" was released as a shortened version, missing a verse, and "Home Recording" was sped up. As of October 1, 2024, this has been corrected. Along with the correction, the track "Intro" was added.

The cover art for Mother EP is the same as Mother's, but with a solid white background instead of a beige one with tainted corners.

== Track listing ==
Mother EP track listing
No.	Title	Length
1.	"Intro"	0:04
2.	"Dirty Town - Mother Version"	2:31
3.	"Oh Ana - Mother Version"	3:05
4.	"Fat Kids"	3:06
5.	"Babies"	2:37
6.	"Mamma Told Me"	3:21
7.	"Home Recording"	1:14
Total length:		15:58

== Personnel ==
=== Mother Mother ===
- Ryan Guldemond – vocals, guitar, percussion, synthesizer
- Molly Guldemond – vocals
- Debra-Jean Creelman – vocals
