= Dianne Bos =

Canadian photographer

Dianne Bos is a Canadian photographer based in Calgary, Alberta, whose works have been exhibited internationally since 1981.

Bos was born in Dundas, Ontario, in 1956. She earned a degree in sculpture from Mount Allison University.

Many of Bos' photographs are produced using a homemade pinhole camera. These images are not intended to be an objective record of a particular object or place, but an attempt to capture a memory.

An exhibit of Bos' photographs produced using a pinhole camera, called Son et Lumiére, was exhibited at the Kamloops Art Gallery in 2002.

Bos participated in the group exhibition, Time & Space curated by Josephine Mills and organized by the University of Lethbridge Art Gallery in 2007. The exhibition toured to the Dunlop Art Gallery, Regina; The Rooms, Newfoundland and Labrador, St. John's; and the Owens Art Gallery, Sackville.

For her Galaxies series, Bos experimented with photographing different light sources through multiple pinholes. Her 2001 work M51 by Candlelight depicts the Whirlpool Galaxy and is included in the New Mexico History Museum's Pinhole Resource Collection. She created the image using an aluminum plate camera dotted with dozens of pinholes of varying sizes. A photograph that Bos took in Toulouse was used by graphic designer Jennifer Clark for her mural Timeless.

Bos made pinhole cameras from old travel books for an exhibition at Toronto's Edward Day Gallery in 2011. R.M. Vaughan described the photographs as both sleepy and tense, writing that they "replicate those first moments of waking, when tenuous reality comes into semi-focus."

Bos is also a keyboardist and singer, and was awarded the 1986 CASBY Award for Most Promising Female Vocalist.

In June 2013, her Bowness home was submerged when the Bow River flooded. She lost her collection of homemade pinhole cameras, her darkroom and studio as well as hundreds of printed images.

Beginning in 2014, Bos travelled to locations in Belgium and France to photograph battle sites where the Canadian (including Newfoundland) troops fought in World War I. The resulting photographs, also taken with a pinhole camera, were shown in a solo exhibition entitled The Sleeping Green: No Man's Land 100 Years Later at the University of Lethbridge Art Gallery and other museums and galleries.

Bos is represented by Edward Day Gallery in Toronto; Jennifer Kostuik Gallery in Vancouver; Newzones in Calgary; and Beaux-arts des Amériques, Montreal.
