= Treehouse (The Grapes of Wrath album) =

Studio album by the Grapes of Wrath
- Released: 1987
- Recorded: March – May 1987
- Genres: Rock, pop, folk rock
- Length: 49:56
- Label: Nettwerk
- Producer: Tom Cochrane

The Grapes of Wrath chronology
September Bowl of Green (1985)	Treehouse (1987)	Now and Again (1989)

Treehouse is the second album by the Canadian band the Grapes of Wrath, released in 1987 on Nettwerk Music Group.

The album peaked at No. 42 in Canada on the RPM Albums chart. Peace of Mind" was the band's first single to reach the RPM singles charts in Canada, peaking at No. 56. "Backward Town" and "O Lucky Man" were also released as singles.

== Production ==
The album was produced by Tom Cochrane. However, he departed the project slightly before it was finished, after conflicting with engineer Ric Arboit over "Peace of Mind"; Cochrane disliked the song and wanted to stop working on it before Arboit or the band thought it was finished. Arboit and Dave Ogilvie finished the final mixes. Cochrane encouraged the band to use pedal steel and keyboards.

== Critical reception ==
Professional ratings
Review scores
Source	Rating
AllMusic	4.5/5 stars

The Los Angeles Times wrote that the album "represents a nifty balancing act between harder-edged rock 'n' roll (courtesy of the Hooper brothers on bass and drums) and a more reflective and breezy folksiness." The Kingston Whig-Standard noted that "the instrumental introduction to 'So Many Times' ends up taking up most of the song, but it's a wonderful blend of piano, organ and drums." The Windsor Star called the album "peppy pop music reminiscent of the Mamas and the Papas and other late-'60s bands that blended folk and rock." The Vancouver Sun deemed "Peace of Mind" "one of the cleanest, freshest songs of the year."

== Track listing ==
1. "O Lucky Man" (3:26)
2. "Backward Town" (4:06)
3. "How Long" (3:04)
4. "Very Special Day" (4:00)
5. "Try" (3:30)
6. "At Your Soul" (3:39)
7. "Peace of Mind" (3:41)
8. "Amused" (0:30)
9. "Amused" (4:44)
10. "So Many Times" (4:13)
11. "Jewel in the Hand" (3:13)
12. "Completely Lost" (4:33)
13. "Run You Down" (2:41)
14. "Seems Like Fate" (4:36)
