= The Grapes of Wrath (band) =

Canadian rock band

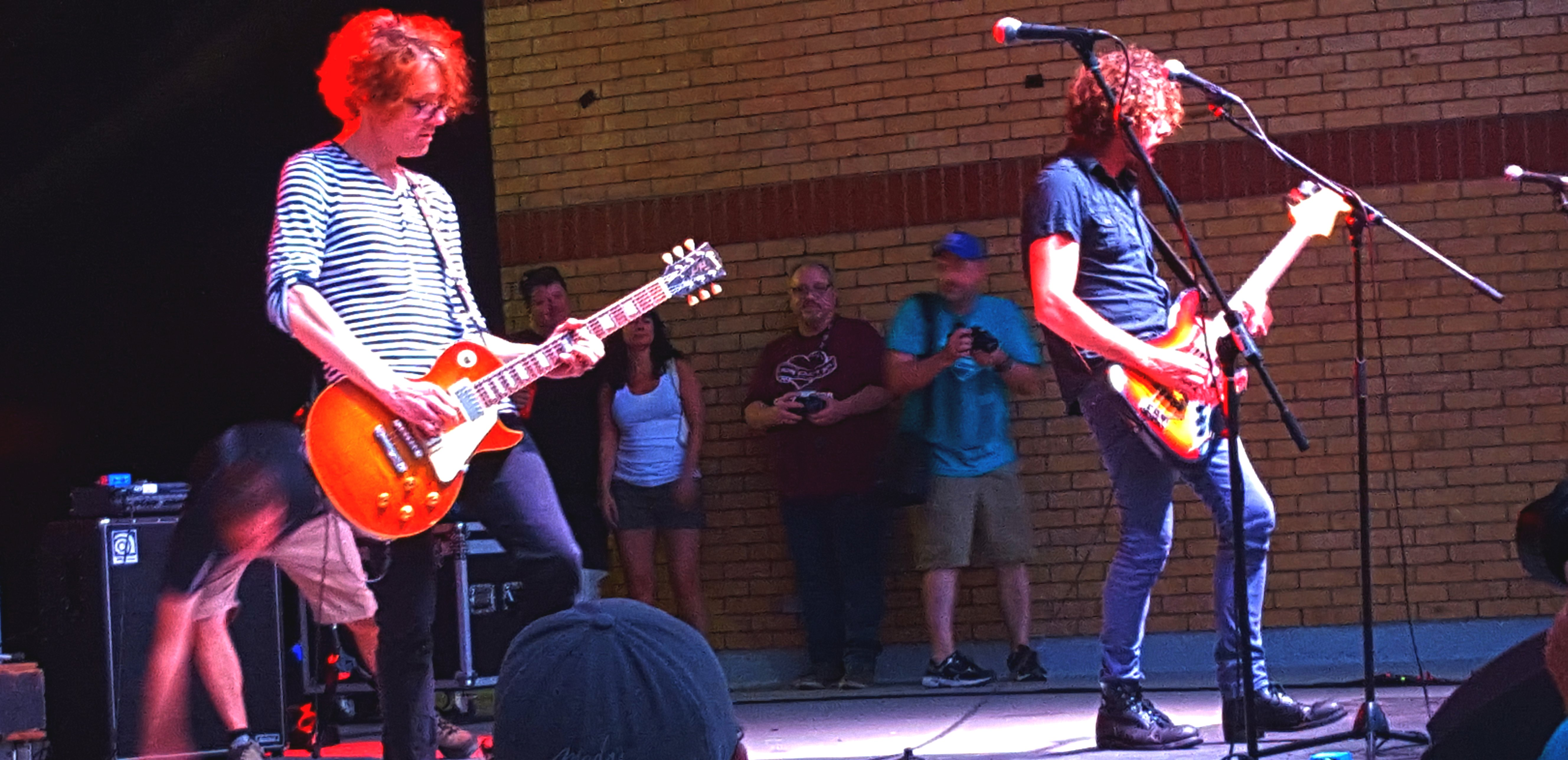
- The Grapes of Wrath performing at the 2015 Home County Folk Festival in London, Ontario

Background information
- Origin: Kelowna, British Columbia, Canada
- Genres: Alternative rock, jangle pop, folk rock, pop rock
- Years active: 1983–1992; 1997–2001; 2010–present
- Labels: Nettwerk; Capitol-EMI; Song Corp. Aporia Records
- Members: Chris Hooper; Tom Hooper; Kevin Kane
- Past members: Vincent Jones

The Grapes of Wrath are a Canadian rock band from Kelowna, British Columbia. Formed in 1983, the group enjoyed their greatest commercial success in the late 1980s and early 1990s. The group split in 1992, with Kane going solo while Jones and the Hoopers continued to record as Ginger. Vocalists Tom Hooper and Kevin Kane briefly reunited as the Grapes of Wrath for one album in 2000. With the return of Chris Hooper for a festival appearance in 2010, the three founding members were back together and have continued to perform and record since.

Singles, a greatest hits collection featuring two new recordings, was released in October 2012 by EMI in Canada. The band's most recent studio album, High Road, was issued in 2013, with a compilation album of sessions recorded for CBC's Brave New Waves following in 2017.

== History ==
The Grapes of Wrath were formed in Kelowna, British Columbia, in 1983 by Chris Hooper, Tom Hooper, and Kevin Kane. All three had been members of the short-lived punk rock band Kill Pigs. They came up with the new band name after looking at a movie guide, though nobody in the band had seen the movie or read the book.

In 1984, they signed to Nettwerk, and released a self-titled EP that year. The following year, their debut album September Bowl of Green was released.

Treehouse (1987), produced by Tom Cochrane, was the band's Canadian breakthrough, yielding the hit single "Peace of Mind".

Their 1989 album, Now and Again, produced by Anton Fier, was the band's most successful. During the demoing process for the album, the band officially added their touring keyboard player, Vincent Jones, to the band as a full member. The band's tour to support this album was also notable for its opening act, a then-emerging singer/songwriter named Sarah McLachlan.

Produced by John Leckie and mixed by Leckie and engineer Gareth Cousins, These Days, released in 1991, found the band experimenting with a harder rock sound, and spawned the band's highest-charting singles, "I Am Here" and "You May Be Right". It received the 1992 CASBY Award for Favourite Album, and "I Am Here" won the CASBY for Best Song.

These Days was, however, to be the band's last new album for almost a decade. In December 1992, it was reported that Kane had left the band. The rest of the band continued to perform and record together as Ginger.

In 1999, Kane and Tom Hooper, the Grapes' principal songwriters, decided to work together again, and in 2000 released Field Trip under the Grapes of Wrath name. Neither Chris Hooper nor Vincent Jones took part in the reunion.

In 2009, Kane and Hooper decided to play together again as an acoustic duo. Several concerts were scheduled in Western Canada.

On July 18, 2010, the three original members performed together at the Surrey Fusion Festival in Surrey, British Columbia. It was the first time the original trio had played together since 1992.

The trio of Hooper/Kane/Hooper continued to tour regularly thereafter, and the Grapes of Wrath announced that they were beginning work on a new album. Two newly recorded tracks from these sessions were issued on the band's 2012 compilation Singles (EMI). To mark this release, the band was joined by guests Sam Roberts, Whitehorse, Ron Sexsmith, Hayden, Great Lake Swimmers and other notable Canadian musicians at Toronto's Mod Club.

The band's latest studio album High Road was released in March 2013 through Aporia Records. The band continues to tour and play live dates.

Kevin Kane joined The Northern Pikes in 2019, though he continues to play shows with The Grapes of Wrath.

== Discography ==
=== Singles ===
Release Date	Title	Peak chart positions	Album
Release Date	Title	Canada RPM 100	Album
1985	"Misunderstanding"		September Bowl of Green
1985	"Love Comes Around"		September Bowl of Green
October 1987	"Peace of Mind"	#56	Treehouse
January 1988	"O Lucky Man"		Treehouse
March 1988	"Backward Town"		Treehouse
July 1989	"All the Things I Wasn't"	#19	Now and Again
October 1989	"Do You Want to Tell Me?"	#50	Now and Again
January 1990	"What Was Going Through My Head"	#33	Now and Again
May 1990	"The Most"		Now and Again
July 1991	"I Am Here"	#8	These Days
October 1991	"You May Be Right"	#7	These Days
February 1992	"A Fishing Tale"	#60	These Days
September 2000	"Black Eye"		Field Trip
March 2013	"Good To See You"		High Road
December 2014	"Mexico"		High Road

=== Albums ===
Year	Title	Certifications
Year	Title	CAN
1984	The Grapes of Wrath	—
1985	September Bowl of Green	—
1987	Treehouse	Gold
1989	Now and Again	Platinum
1991	These Days	Platinum
2000	Field Trip	—
2013	High Road	—
2017	Brave New Waves session	—

==== Compilations ====
- Seems Like Fate 1984–1992 (1994)
- Singles (2012)
