= Seems Like Fate 1984–1992 =

Compilation album by The Grapes of Wrath
- Released: 1994
- Recorded: 1984–1992
- Genre: Folk rock
- Length: 74:22
- Label: EMI Music Canada
- Producer: Various

The Grapes of Wrath chronology
These Days (1991)	Seems Like Fate 1984–1992 (1994)	Field Trip (2000)

Seems Like Fate 1984–1992 is a 1994 compilation album by The Grapes of Wrath, released after their break-up in 1992. The collection comprises the major single releases, in addition to all of the B-Sides to singles not included on full-length albums and a previously unreleased demo and remix. The disc comes with a colour booklet detailing the band's history and discography (written and designed by Ralph Alfonso).

In 2001, an accompanying DVD was released called Seems Like Fate - The Videos. The DVD includes the Those Days video collection in addition to the "A Fishing Tale" video, all of the Ginger promotional videos and Kevin Kane's solo video for "The Sinking Song". It does not include material from the 2000 reunion album Field Trip. It was rated three stars by AllMusic.

== Track listing ==
1. "Misunderstanding" – 2:29
2. "I Am Here (7" Edit)" – 4:09
3. "Peace of Mind (Live)" – 4:40 (B-side to "A Fishing Tale" single)
4. "You May Be Right (AOR Mix)" – 4:24
5. "Do You Want To Tell Me" – 3:34
6. "Stay" – 3:49
7. "Backward Town (Acoustic on CBC Radio)" – 2:43 (B-side to "Do You Want to Tell Me" single)
8. "A Fishing Tale (Single Edit)" – 3:42
9. "All the Time" – 3:56 (B-side to "I Am Here" single)
10. "Run You Down" – 2:38
11. "Fid's Theme (Instrumental)" – 1:30 (1990 previously unreleased demo)
12. "All the Things I Wasn't" – 2:17
13. "What Was Going Through My Head" – 2:47
14. "Let Me Roll It" – 4:22 (B-side to "What Was Going Through My Head" single)
15. "See Emily Play" – 3:20 (B-side to "I Am Here" single)
16. "O Lucky Man" – 3:25
17. "I Can't Find My Home (Remix)" – 3:46 (previously unreleased)
18. "Down So Close" – 4:07 (B-side to "You May Be Right" single)
19. "I Am Here (12" Extended Mix)" – 6:36 (B-side to "I Am Here" CD single)
20. "Seems Like Fate" – 4:34
21. "Christmas Greeting" (hidden track)
