= September Bowl of Green =

Studio album by the Grapes of Wrath
- Released: 1985
- Studios: Profile, Inside Trak
- Genre: Folk rock
- Length: 60:17
- Label: Nettwerk
- Producers: Greg Reely, Tom Cochrane

The Grapes of Wrath chronology
The Grapes of Wrath (1984)	September Bowl of Green (1985)	Treehouse (1987)

September Bowl of Green is an album by the Canadian band the Grapes of Wrath, released in 1985. The initial vinyl pressing of the album included a cover version of the Beatles song "If I Needed Someone"; it was left off of subsequent pressings. All of the songs were composed by Tom Hooper/Kevin Kane/Chris Hooper. Tom Cochrane remixed some of the tracks.

== Critical reception ==
Professional ratings
Review scores
Source	Rating
AllMusic	3/5 stars

The Advocate opined that "the predominant use of acoustic guitar with electric instruments is nothing new, but the Grapes of Wrath maintains a warm sound without ever once sounding wimpy." The Daily Breeze called the album "an uneven but often captivating collection of delicate folk-rock, with lots of strumming acoustic guitars and some winning melodies."

AllMusic wrote that "the jangly guitars and harmonies win out for a pleasing, though unspectacular, debut."

== Track listing ==
1. Misunderstanding (Tom Cochrane Remix) 2:29
2. Love Comes Around (Tom Cochrane Remix) 3:31
3. Breaks My Heart↑ 5:49
4. A Dream (About You) 3:07
5. Didn't You Say Something 4:55
6. And I Know 4:43
7. Self-Abuse 3:37
8. Umbrella 4:01
9. Realistic Birds 5:30
10. See Her Go↑ 3:27
11. Lay Out the Trap 4:27
12. Down to the Wire 4:03
13. Laughing Out Loud 4:11
14. Breaks My Heart (Live) 5:47

↑Tracks on the CD that are omitted on vinyl

=== Original vinyl track listing ===
1. Misunderstanding (Original Greg Reely Mix)
2. Love Comes Around (Original Greg Reely Mix)
3. Breaks My Heart
4. A Dream (About You)
5. Didn't You Say Something
6. And I Know
7. Self-Abuse
8. Umbrella
9. If I Needed Someone
10. Realistic Birds
