= The Grapes of Wrath (album) =

EP by The Grapes of Wrath
- Released: 1984
- Genre: Pop, rock
- Label: Nettwerk

The Grapes of Wrath chronology
The Grapes of Wrath (1984)	September Bowl of Green (1985)

The Grapes of Wrath is the debut EP by The Grapes of Wrath, released in 1984.

== Track listing ==
- All tracks written by Hooper/Kane/Hooper
1. "Misunderstanding" - 2:29
2. "Lay Out the Trap" - 4:23
3. "Down to the Wire" - 3:56
4. "Laughing Out Loud" - 4:09

== Personnel ==
- Tom Hooper – Backing Vocals, Bass
- Chris Hooper – Drums
- Kevin Kane – Guitar, Vocals
- Produced By – Greg Reely
