= Eureka (Mother Mother album) =

2011 album by Mother Mother

Studio album by Mother Mother
- Released: March 15, 2011
- Recorded: 2010
- Genre: Indie rock
- Length: 42:55
- Label: Last Gang
- Producer: Ryan Guldemond

Mother Mother chronology
O My Heart (2008)	Eureka (2011)	The Sticks (2012)

Singles from Eureka
- 1. "The Stand" Released: January 10, 2011; 2. "Baby Don't Dance" Released: 2011; 3. "Simply Simple" Released: 2011

Professional ratings
Review scores
Source	Rating
The 405	(9/10)
AllMusic	3.5/5 stars
Chart Attack	2.5/5 stars
DIY	4/5 stars
The Globe and Mail	4/4 stars
Now	4/5 stars
PopMatters	(8/10)

Eureka is the third album by Vancouver-based indie rock band Mother Mother. It was produced by band member Ryan Guldemond and mixed by Mike Fraser.

== Background and recording ==
For Mother Mother's third album, frontman Ryan Guldemond took on the role of producer. Eureka follows a distinct departure from Mother Mother's usual sound, having a more pop-inspired sound, whilst still being a rock album.

The album was mixed by Juno-winning Mike Fraser, who is known for working with AC/DC.

Although "The Stand" was the album's most popular song at the time of its release, the song "Problems" later became the most-streamed track from Eureka due to the band going viral on TikTok in 2020.

== Singles ==
The album's first single, "The Stand", peaked at number 76 on the Canadian Hot 100 music chart. Its second single, "Baby Don't Dance" was the first to be co-written by drummer Ali Siadat. Music videos were released for both singles.

== Commercial performance ==
The album debuted at number 8 on the Canadian Albums Chart selling 3,500 copies.

== Track listing ==
All songs written by Ryan Guldemond, except where noted.

No.	Title	Length
1.	"Chasing it Down"	4:10
2.	"The Stand"	2:56
3.	"Baby Don't Dance" (Guldemond, Ali Siadat)	3:30
4.	"Original Spin"	3:32
5.	"Born in a Flash"	3:11
6.	"Simply Simple" (Guldemond, Jeremy Page)	3:32
7.	"Problems"	3:27
8.	"Aspiring Fires"	3:34
9.	"Getaway"	3:39
10.	"Far in Time"	3:20
11.	"Oleander"	3:20
12.	"Calm Me Down"	4:42
13.	"In the Wings" (bonus track)	4:00
14.	"Carve a Name" (bonus track)	3:26
15.	"Forever and a Bit" (extended edition)	1:58
16.	"Had It All" (extended edition)	2:37

== Personnel ==
=== Mother Mother ===
- Ryan Guldemond - guitar, vocals, composer
- Molly Guldemond - vocals, keyboard
- Jasmin Parkin - keyboard, vocals
- Jeremy Page - bass
- Ali Siadat - drums, backing vocals

=== Additional Personnel ===
- Jesse Zubot - violin
- Peggy Lee - cello
- Casey Guldemond - backing vocals
- Aaron Nordean - backing vocals
- Shawn Penner - percussion

=== Production ===
- Mike Fraser - producer, mixing
- Ryan Guldemond - producer
- Mother Mother - arrangements
- Andy VanDette - mastering
- Shawn Penner - engineer
- Todd Duym - photography
- Molly Guldemond - artwork, design
