= Graffiti (magazine) =

Canadian music magazine

Graffiti was a Canadian music magazine in the 1980s. It was first published in 1984. The magazine's primary focus was on Canadian and international alternative music, although it also covered fashion and film. Alastair Sutherland was one of the editors-in-chief of the magazine, which was headquartered in Toronto. It was published monthly.

In 1985, the magazine distributed the ballots for the then-new CASBY Awards. Graffiti ceased publication in 1986.
