= Grief Chapter =

Studio album by Mother Mother
- Released: February 16, 2024
- Length: 40:22
- Label: Warner
- Producer: Ryan Guldemond; Jason Van Poederooyen

Mother Mother chronology
Inside (2021)	Grief Chapter (2024)	Mother EP (2024)

Singles from Grief Chapter
- 1. "Normalize" Released: July 22, 2023; 2. "To My Heart" Released: September 15, 2023; 3. "The Matrix" Released: November 3, 2023; 4. "Nobody Escapes" Released: January 19, 2024

Grief Chapter is the ninth studio album by Vancouver-based indie rock band Mother Mother, released on February 16, 2024, by Warner Records. It was produced by Ryan Guldemond and Jason Van Poederooyen.

== Track listing ==
All tracks are written by Ryan Guldemond, except where noted.

Grief Chapter track listing
No.	Title	Lyrics	Length
1.	"Nobody Escapes"	Ryan Guldemond, Ali Siadat	2:55
2.	"To My Heart"		3:05
3.	"Explode!"		2:31
4.	"Head Shrink"		3:15
5.	"Days"		2:56
6.	"Forever"		5:50
7.	"Normalize"	R. Guldemond, Molly Guldemond, Mike Young	4:19
8.	"Goddamn Staying Power"		1:17
9.	"The Matrix"		3:21
10.	"God's Plan"		4:17
11.	"End of Me"		3:25
12.	"Grief Chapter"	R. Guldemond, John Hadfield	3:11
Total length:			40:22

== Personnel ==
=== Mother Mother ===
- Molly Guldemond – vocals, synthesizer
- Ryan Guldemond – lead vocals, guitar, production (all tracks); additional engineering (2–6, 8–12), engineering (7)
- Jasmin Parkin – keyboard, vocals
- Ali Siadat – drums
- Mike Young – bass (all tracks), editing (tracks 1–6, 8–12)

=== Additional musicians ===
- Elisa Thorn – harp (tracks 1, 5, 9)
- Jerry Cook – saxophone (tracks 1, 9)
- Peggy Lee – cello (tracks 2, 4)
- Josh Zubot – violin (tracks 2, 4, 7)
- Brian Chan – cello (track 7)
- Finn Manniche – cello (track 7)
- Meredith Bates – violin (track 7)
- Pamela Attariwala – violin (track 7)
- John Hadfield – backing vocals (track 12)

=== Technical ===
- Jason Van Poederooyen – production, engineering
- Randy Merrill – mastering engineer
- Rich Costey – mixing
- Justin Gray – mixing (track 1)
- Stefan Nowarre – editing
- Flavio Cirillo – drum technician
- Theo Wagner – production assistance (track 7)
- Jeff Citron – mixing assistance (track 7)
- Johnny Andrews – drum technician (track 7)

== Charts ==
Chart performance for Grief Chapter
Chart (2024)	Peak position
Hungarian Physical Albums (MAHASZ)	11
Scottish Albums (OCC)	91
