= The Stand (song) =

Single by Mother Mother

from the album Eureka
- Released: January 10, 2011
- Recorded: 2010
- Genre: Indie rock, alternative rock
- Length: 2:56
- Label: Last Gang Records

Mother Mother singles chronology
"The Stand" (2011)	"Baby Don't Dance" (2011)

"The Stand" is the lead single from Canadian band Mother Mother's third album, Eureka. It is the first song from Mother Mother to chart in the Canadian Hot 100, where it went to No. 76.

== Music video ==
The music video features band members Ryan Guldemond, Molly Guldemond, and Jasmin Parkin sitting in a white room with Ryan on one couch and the two women on the other. Molly and Jasmin are dressed oddly, and also have bizarre hairstyles. The two are giving Ryan a counseling session, and what they talk about appear as images on the walls. Occasionally, band members Ali Siadat and Jeremy Page also can be seen sitting on the couch with Ryan. The video also cuts to scenes of the band performing in the (presumably) same white room.

== Charts ==
Chart (2011)	Peak position
Canadian Hot 100	76
Canadian Alternative Chart	3
