= Dance and Cry =

2018 album by Mother Mother

Studio album by Mother Mother
- Released: November 2, 2018
- Genre: Indie rock
- Length: 40:06
- Label: Universal Music Canada
- Producers: Ryan Guldemond, Ben Kaplan

Mother Mother chronology
No Culture (2017)	Dance and Cry (2018)	Inside (2021)

Singles from Dance and Cry
- 1. "Get Up" Released: September 14, 2018

Dance and Cry is the seventh album by Vancouver-based indie rock band Mother Mother, released on November 2, 2018. It was produced by Ryan Guldemond and Ben Kaplan.

== Track listing ==
All tracks are written by Ryan Guldemond.

No.	Title	Length
1.	"I Must Cry Out Loud"	4:41
2.	"Dance and Cry"	3:17
3.	"Get Up"	3:24
4.	"So Down"	3:01
5.	"Good at Loving You"	2:38
6.	"Biting on a Rose"	1:39
7.	"It's Alright"	2:55
8.	"Give Me Back the Night"	3:09
9.	"Back to Life"	2:45
10.	"Only Love"	4:13
11.	"Bottom Is a Rock"	3:33
12.	"Keep"	4:51
Total length:		40:06

== Personnel ==
- Molly Guldemond – vocals and keyboard
- Ryan Guldemond – guitar and vocals
- Jasmin Parkin – keyboard and vocals
- Ali Siadat – drums
- Mike Young – bass

== Charts ==
Chart (2018)	Peak position
Canadian Albums (Billboard)	53
