= Hayloft (song) =

2008 song by Mother Mother

Song by Mother Mother

from the album O My Heart
- Released: September 16, 2008
- Genre: Indie rock
- Length: 3:02
- Label: Last Gang Records
- Songwriter: Ryan Guldemond
- Producer: Howard Redekopp

"Hayloft", later re-released as "Hayloft I", is a 2008 song by Canadian indie rock band Mother Mother. It is the eighth song from their second studio album, O My Heart. The song tells the story of two young lovers unsuccessfully attempting to hide from the armed father of one of the pair. It did not find commercial success upon release, but attracted attention twelve years later from users on TikTok. The belated success of "Hayloft" led Mother Mother to release "Hayloft II", a sequel song that concludes the story.

== Composition and recording ==
Sample of the guitar riff played by Ryan Guldemond

"Hayloft" was composed by Mother Mother's vocalist and songwriter, Ryan Guldemond. He started the piece with the song's guitar riff, writing the next few pieces of the song with the intention of phonetically fitting the words to the "angular melody" rather than constructing a complete story, leading to lyrics like "my daddy's got a gun". The finished version, 45 seconds after the guitar introduces the song, narrates the story of a young person hiding in their hayloft with their lover. The song ends with the father appearing with his gun, the story ending inconclusively.

"Hayloft" is written in the key of A minor with a moderate tempo of around 96 BPM. The song briefly modulates to B♭ minor before returning to its original key.

== Release and reaction ==
"Hayloft" did not break into wide circulation upon release in O My Heart – while it received some radio play, it did not make an impression on wider audiences then and there. However, in 2020, the song became a larger success, primarily due to attention on TikTok, a social media platform. By the first week of August 2020, "Hayloft" had amassed 100,000 streams, in total, across all streaming platforms; by October, the song was pulling in 1 million streams every week. It also became the band's most-streamed track.

=== Sequel song ===
"Hayloft II"

Song by Mother Mother
- Released: January 28, 2022
- Genre: Indie rock
- Length: 3:35
- Label: Warner Music Canada
- Songwriter: Ryan Guldemond
- Producers: Howard Redekopp, Ryan Guldemond

According to Guldemond, the success of "Hayloft" made the band want to write a song with similar energy – initially reticent to simply write a sequel, Mother Mother warmed to the idea after pitching it to fans and receiving a positive response. With the announcement of the sequel song, "Hayloft II", the original song was re-released as "Hayloft I" with an accompanying new music video, directed by Emma Higgins. As of January 14, 2022, the sequel was set to be released on January 28, with a music video of its own. The song portrays the protagonist fantasizing about murdering her father as revenge for him killing her lover.

== Charts ==
=== Weekly charts ===
Canada (Canadian Rock/Alternative chart)	43
Lithuania (AGATA)	26
UK Independent Singles Chart	8

Certifications for "Hayloft"
Region	Certification	Certified units/sales
New Zealand (RMNZ)	Platinum	30,000^{‡}
United Kingdom (BPI)	Gold	400,000^{‡}
United States (RIAA)	Platinum	1,000,000^{‡}
^{‡} Sales+streaming figures based on certification alone.

=== Hayloft II ===
Charts
Chart	Peak position	Ref.
Canadian Hot 100	94	

Certifications for "Hayloft II"
Region	Certification	Certified units/sales
Canada (Music Canada)	Platinum	80,000^{‡}
Poland (ZPAV)	Gold	25,000^{‡}
United Kingdom (BPI)	Silver	200,000^{‡}
United States (RIAA)	Gold	500,000^{‡}
^{‡} Sales+streaming figures based on certification alone.
