= Mother (Mother Mother album) =

Studio album by Mother Mother
- Released: 2005
- Genre: Indie rock
- Length: 42:40
- Label: None
- Producers: Howard Redekopp, Ryan Guldemond

Mother Mother chronology
Mother (2005)	Touch Up (2007)

Mother is an indie rock album by Mother Mother, released independently in 2005. The album was eponymous, with the band's name at the time being Mother. The album was re-released as Touch Up in 2007, with the tracks "Fat Kids", "Babies", "Mamma Told Me", and "Home Recording" replaced by new songs, "Legs Away" and "Touch Up".

== Mother EP ==
On September 27, 2024, "Fat Kids", "Babies", "Mamma Told Me", and "Home Recording" were re-released as part of the Mother EP.

== Track listing ==
Mother track listing
No.	Title	Length
1.	"Dirty Town"	2:32
2.	"Love and Truth"	3:35
3.	"Oh Ana"	3:17
4.	"Little Hands"	2:27
5.	"Polynesia"	2:19
6.	"Angry Sea"	3:05
7.	"Train of Thought"	2:41
8.	"Verbatim"	2:48
9.	"Tic Toc"	1:31
10.	"Ball Cap"	3:20
11.	"Fat Kids"	3:05
12.	"Neighbour"	4:39
13.	"Babies"	2:36
14.	"Mamma Told Me"	3:39
15.	"Home Recording"	1:21
Total length:		42:40

== Personnel ==
=== Mother Mother ===
- Ryan Guldemond – vocals, guitar, percussion, synthesizer
- Molly Guldemond – vocals
- Debra-Jean Creelman – vocals

=== Technical personnel ===
- Mother Mother – audio Production, composer
- Howard Redekopp – producer, engineer, mixer
