= Terry McBride (CEO) =

Canadian music manager (born 1960)

- Born: 1960 (age 65–66); Vancouver, British Columbia, Canada
- Occupations: CEO of Nettwerk Music Group and YYoga

Terry McBride (born 1960) is the CEO and one of four founders of the Nettwerk Music Group, which includes Nettwerk Productions (independent record label), Nettwerk Management (artist and producer management), Nettwerk One (publishing), and Artwerks (graphic and fashion design).

== Biography ==
Founded in McBride's apartment in 1984 after dropping out of the University of British Columbia, Nettwerk has corporate offices in Vancouver, Boston, Los Angeles, Nashville, New York, Hamburg and London. Nettwerk Management's clients include Stereophonics, K-os, Lissie and Katherine Jenkins. Since 1984, Nettwerk has released over 500 albums and sold over 150 million copies worldwide.

McBride has spoken publicly about advances in digital technology, intellectual property rights and the future of music distribution. In 2008, McBride co-authored a paper for the British University of Westminster's "Musictank" entitled "Meet the Millennials".

In 2004, McBride became interested in yoga. With Lara Kozan, he launched a chain of wellness centers called YYoga.

In 2008, he re-launched Nutone Music. Its repertoire includes devotional chant, World Music, and Mantra music.

McBride's latest endeavor, Polyphonic, founded in partnership with the MAMA Group and ATC will invest directly into artist businesses, offering an alternative to the traditional label-driven investment model of the music industry. Launched with an initial capitalization of $20 million, Polyphonic will seek to partner with artists and their management, providing the capital to enable them to operate their own businesses, retain their own copyrights and take a fair share of any profits that are generated.

At the 2003 Juno Awards McBride received the Walt Grealis Special Achievement Award, recognizing an outstanding individual who has contributed to the growth and advancement of the Canadian music industry.

In 2015, McBride joined The 14th annual Independent Music Awards judging panel to assist independent musicians' careers. He was also a judge for the 12th and 13th Independent Music Awards.

== Awards ==
In 2003, Nettwerk Management was the recipient of Ernst & Young's Entrepreneur Of The Year award.

McBride has also twice been awarded the Pollstar Industry Award for Personal Manager of the year for his work with Sarah McLachlan (1997) and Avril Lavigne / Coldplay (2002).
