= Field Trip (album) =

Studio album by The Grapes of Wrath
- Released: September 2000
- Recorded: July–Sept 2000
- Studios: Greenhouse Studios, Burnaby BC. Hipposonic Studios, Vancouver BC
- Genre: Folk rock
- Label: Song / UniDisc Music Ltd. (2025 Re-release)
- Producer: Grapes of Wrath

The Grapes of Wrath chronology
Seems Like Fate 1984–1992 (1994)	Field Trip (2000)	Singles (2012)

Field Trip is an album by Canadian rock band The Grapes of Wrath, released in 2000. The album marked the reunion of Kevin Kane and Tom Hooper as songwriting partners and bandmates for the first time since 1991's These Days, although they were the only two original band members to appear on the album. Session musicians filled in the remaining slots left by departing members Chris Hooper and Vincent Jones, including Pete Bourne on drums and Dave Genn on keyboards.

The album was also packaged with a bonus disc comprising new renditions of several of the band's older songs. Matt Brain drums on the bonus disc.

A video was released for the song "Black Eye".

After the tour for this album, Hooper and Kane said that they, "...had taken the reunion as far as they could take it" and decided to part ways. The group once again reunited for live dates in 2010, but did not release another album of new material until 2013's High Road.

In late 2025, the album, including the tracks on the bonus disc, was re-released on the UniDisc Music Inc. label for streaming platforms.

Sean Carruthers of AllMusic rated the album 4.5 out of 5 stars, describing it as "a welcome return" following the group’s hiatus.

== Track listing ==
1. Black Eye (Kane)
2. Like a Fool (Hooper/Little)
3. 18 (Kane)
4. Sell the Goat (Hooper)
5. Rivers Flow (Kane)
6. Hitchhiker (Hooper)
7. Dropping the Y (Kane)
8. Head in My Hands (Hooper)
9. Jack's Dilemma (Kane/Collins/Kravec)
10. Begin Communication (Hooper/Little)
11. But Oh Well (Kane)
12. Still Confused (Hooper)

=== Bonus Disc ("Extended Field Trip") ===
This disc was recorded June 12–16, 2000 in Vancouver. Tracks 1–4 are new acoustic versions of Grapes of Wrath hit singles. Note that the author credits as listed on this disc differ from the author credits as found on the original recordings.

Tracks 5 and 6 are cover versions of songs by The Monkees and Albert Hammond, respectively.

1. Misunderstanding (Hooper/Kane/Hooper)
2. You May Be Right (Hooper/Jones/Hooper)
3. All the Things I Wasn't (Kane)
4. What Was Going Through My Head (Hooper/Jones/Hooper)
5. Porpoise Song (Goffin/King)
6. Ninety Nine Miles from L.A. (Hammond)

=== Personnel ===
Produced by: The Grapes of Wrath

Engineer: Lee Preston

Additional Engineering: Ryan Froggett

Mix Engineer: Dave "Rave" Ogilvie
