= No Culture =

2017 album by Mother Mother

Studio album by Mother Mother
- Released: February 10, 2017
- Studio: The Warehouse Studio
- Genre: Indie rock
- Length: 35:24
- Label: Universal Music Canada (Canada); Def Jam (US)
- Producer: Ryan Guldemond; Brian Howes; Jason Van Poederooyen

Mother Mother chronology
Very Good Bad Thing (2014)	No Culture (2017)	Dance and Cry (2018)

Singles from No Culture
- 1. "The Drugs" Released: November 4, 2016; 2. "Love Stuck" Released: November 29, 2016; 3. "Letter" Released: January 13, 2017

No Culture is the sixth album by Vancouver-based indie rock band Mother Mother, released on February 10, 2017. It was produced by Ryan Guldemond, Brian Howes, and Jason Van Poederooyen.

== Track listing ==
No.	Title	Writer(s)	Length
1.	"Free"	Ryan Guldemond; Ryan Dahle; Brian Howes; Jason Van Poederooyen	3:23
2.	"Love Stuck"	Guldemond; Howes; Van Poederooyen	3:41
3.	"The Drugs"	Guldemond; Ali Siadat; Jocelyn Alice; Maia Davies; David Mohacsi; Thomas Salter	3:13
4.	"Back in School"	Guldemond; Howes; Van Poederooyen	3:13
5.	"Letter"	Guldemond; Howes; Van Poederooyen	3:54
6.	"Baby Boy"	Guldemond	3:26
7.	"Mouth of the Devil"	Guldemond	3:40
8.	"No Culture"	Guldemond; Siadat	3:36
9.	"Everything Is Happening"	Guldemond	4:06
10.	"Family"	Guldemond	3:12
Total length:			35:24

Deluxe edition
No.	Title	Writer(s)	Length
11.	"Empty Hands"	Guldemond	3:03
12.	"Worry"	Guldemond; Jasmin Parkin	3:53
13.	"Cut the String"	Guldemond	5:02

== Personnel ==
- Molly Guldemond – vocals, synthesizer
- Ryan Guldemond – guitar, vocals, production, programming (all tracks); engineering (tracks 11–13)
- Jasmin Parkin – keyboards, vocals, production
- Ali Siadat – percussion
- Jeremy Page – bass guitar, saxophone

Additional contributors

- Brian Howes – guitar, vocals, production (tracks 1–10)
- Jason Van Poederooyen – keyboards, percussion, production, programming, mixing, engineering (tracks 1–10)
- Ryan Dahle – production, mixing (tracks 11–13)
- Misha Rajaratnam – editing

== Charts ==
Chart (2017)	Peak position
Canadian Albums (Billboard)	7
