= Touch Up =

2007 album by Mother Mother

Studio album by Mother Mother
- Released: February 27, 2007
- Genre: Indie rock
- Length: 39:43
- Label: Last Gang
- Producer: Howard Redekopp

Mother Mother chronology
| Mother (2005) | Touch Up (2007) | O My Heart (2008) |

Professional ratings
Review scores
| Source | Rating |
|---|---|
| Pitchfork Media | (6.6/10) |

Touch Up is the official debut album by indie rock band Mother Mother, released on February 27, 2007, through Last Gang Records. The album is a 'touched up' re-release of their 2005 album Mother. Two extra tracks have been added that were not on Mother; "Legs Away" and "Touch Up", but four tracks were also removed: "Fat Kids", "Babies", "Mamma Told Me" and "Home Recording".

== Background and recording ==
During 2005, Mother released their self-titled album, Mother. Two years later, after signing with Last Gang Records, a renamed Mother Mother released Touch Up, a remixed and remastered version of the album.

In an interview during Touch Up's fifteen year anniversary, frontman Ryan Guldemond said: "When it came time to refurbish this album — self-titled as Mother — into Touch Up, we were signed to Last Gang Records, had a little more money to use a proper studio, and didn't feel quite as green in album-making."

During late 2020, a few songs from Touch Up went viral on TikTok, such as "Verbatim" and "Oh Ana."

== Track listing ==
All songs are written by Ryan Guldemond, except where noted.

| No. | Title | Writer(s) | Length |
|---|---|---|---|
| 1. | "Dirty Town" | | 2:30 |
| 2. | "Polynesia" | | 2:19 |
| 3. | "Angry Sea" | | 3:05 |
| 4. | "Oh Ana" | | 3:17 |
| 5. | "Legs Away" | R. Guldemond, Molly Guldemond | 3:53 |
| 6. | "Love and Truth" | | 3:32 |
| 7. | "Train of Thought" | | 2:39 |
| 8. | "Verbatim" | | 2:46 |
| 9. | "Neighbour" | | 4:36 |
| 10. | "Ball Cap" | | 3:20 |
| 11. | "Tic Toc" | | 1:29 |
| 12. | "Touch Up" | | 3:49 |
| 13. | "Little Hands" | | 2:27 |
| Total length: | | | 38:34 |

== Personnel ==
All credits are adapted from the liner notes of "Touch Up".

=== Mother Mother ===
- Ryan Guldemond – vocals, guitar, synth, percussion
- Molly Guldemond – vocals
- Debra-Jean Creelman – vocals, piano
- Jeremy Page – bass, clarinet, tenor sax, alto sax
- Kenton Loewen – drums

=== Additional Personnel ===
- Kurt Dahle – drums (tracks 2, 3, 6, 9)
- David Spidel – bass (track 2), double bass (tracks 7, 9, 10)
- Phil Comparelli – trumpet (track 6)
- Howard Redekopp – bass (track 8)
- Issah Contractor – drums (track 8)

=== Production ===
- Mother Mother – audio Production
- Howard Redekopp – production, engineering, mixing
- Craig Waddell – mastering
- Shawn Penner – additional engineering
- Molly Guldemond – artwork & design
- Jeremy Page – artwork & design
