= Very Good Bad Thing =

2014 album by Mother Mother

Studio album by Mother Mother
- Released: November 4, 2014
- Studios: Noble Street Studios (Toronto, Ontario)
- Genre: Indie rock
- Labels: Universal Music Canada (CAN); Def Jam (US)
- Producer: Gavin Brown

Mother Mother chronology
| The Sticks (2012) | Very Good Bad Thing (2014) | No Culture (2017) |

Singles from Very Good Bad Thing
- 1. "Get Out the Way" Released: July 15, 2014; 2. "Monkey Tree" Released: October 31, 2014; 3. "Modern Love" Released: August 30, 2015

Very Good Bad Thing is the fifth album by Vancouver-based indie rock band Mother Mother. It was produced by Gavin Brown.

Professional ratings
Review scores
| Source | Rating |
|---|---|
| Exclaim! | 6/10 stars |
| Music Express | positive |

== Themes ==
As with other albums from the band, Very Good Bad Thing discusses themes of complicated interpersonal relationships, identity, and societal pressures and expectations. Tracks such as the title song "Very Good Bad Thing" and "I Go Hungry", specifically talk about a toxic relationship that feels impossible to escape, and destroying one's self for their love. The track "Have It Out" is one of the most emotionally charged of the album, in which the narrator holds such intense self-hatred for themselves it causes "World War III of [themselves]", and they mutilate themselves for what they believe are their flaws.

This album sees a shift from the characteristic of their previous albums, with a more electronic and synth-focused soundscape, marking an important journey in their growth, which would get referenced throughout their later albums.

== Track listing ==
All songs written by Ryan Guldemond.

| No. | Title | Length |
|---|---|---|
| 1. | "Get Out the Way" | 2:45 |
| 2. | "Monkey Tree" | 3:27 |
| 3. | "Modern Love" | 3:11 |
| 4. | "Reaper Man" | 4:40 |
| 5. | "I Go Hungry" | 3:37 |
| 6. | "Have It Out" | 3:39 |
| 7. | "Very Good Bad Thing" | 4:05 |
| 8. | "Kept Down" | 4:19 |
| 9. | "Shout If You Know" | 3:07 |
| 10. | "Alone and Sublime" | 5:44 |
| Total length: | | 38:34 |

Deluxe edition
| No. | Title | Length |
|---|---|---|
| 11. | "No One to Nothing" | 3:30 |
| 12. | "Jump the Fence" | 3:04 |
| 13. | "Insane" | 3:07 |
| 14. | "Play" | 3:09 |
| 15. | "Monkey Tree (UK Mix)" | 3:21 |
| Total length: | | 54:00 |

- Mastered by Ted Jensen at Sterling Sound, NYC

== Personnel ==
- Molly Guldemond – vocals and keyboard
- Ryan Guldemond – guitar and vocals
- Jasmin Parkin – keyboard and vocals
- Ali Siadat – drums
- Jeremy Page – bass
