= The Sticks (album) =

2012 album by Mother Mother

Studio album by Mother Mother
- Released: (Canada) September 18, 2012 (United States) February 12, 2013
- Studio: Hipposonic Studios (Vancouver)
- Genre: Indie rock
- Length: 47:40
- Label: Last Gang Records
- Producers: Ryan Guldemond; Ben Kaplan

Mother Mother chronology
Eureka (2011)	The Sticks (2012)	Very Good Bad Thing (2014)

Singles from The Sticks
- 1. "Let's Fall in Love" Released: July 17, 2012; 2. "Bit By Bit" Released: 2012; 3. "Infinitesimal" Released: 2013

Professional ratings
Review scores
Source	Rating
AllMusic	4/5 stars
Edmonton Journal	4/5 stars

The Sticks is the fourth album by Vancouver-based indie rock band Mother Mother released in Canada on September 18, 2012, and in the United States on February 12, 2013. It is a concept album that deals with the notions of isolation, escapism and withdrawal from modern society. It was produced by band member Ryan Guldemond and producer Ben Kaplan.

The album's first single, "Let's Fall in Love", was released on July 17, 2012. The single also included the B-Side track “The Sticks”. The second album single “Bit By Bit” was released October 22 with exclusive B-side “Slip Away” which was a song cut from the official album.

== Track listing ==
All songs written by Ryan Guldemond.

No.	Title	Length
1.	"Omen"	1:07
2.	"The Sticks"	4:03
3.	"Let's Fall in Love"	3:08
4.	"Business Man"	3:21
5.	"Dread in my Heart"	2:32
6.	"Infinitesimal"	2:57
7.	"Happy"	3:58
8.	"Bit By Bit"	3:18
9.	"Latter Days"	3:30
10.	"Little Pistol"	4:29
11.	"Love it Dissipates"	3:00
12.	"Cry Forum"	4:03
13.	"Waiting for the World to End"	4:20
14.	"To the Wild"	3:51
15.	"Cesspool of Love (Bonus Track)"	3:06
16.	"All Gone (Bonus Track)"	3:45

== Personnel ==
- Molly Guldemond - vocals and keyboard
- Ryan Guldemond - guitar and Main vocals
- Jasmin Parkin - keyboard and vocals
- Ali Siadat - drums
- Jeremy Page - bass
