= Nettwerk Music Group =

Canadian record label

- Founded: 1984; 42 years ago
- Founder: Terry McBride; Mark Jowett; Tom Ferris; Cal Stephenson
- Distributors: Nettwerk; Direct Distribution
- Genre: Various
- Country of origin: Canada
- Location: Vancouver, B.C.; Los Angeles; New York; London; Hamburg; Sydney; Nashville; Toronto; Denver; Amsterdam
- Official website: nettwerk.com

Nettwerk Music Group is an independent record label founded in 1984.

The Vancouver-based company was created by principals Terry McBride and Mark Jowett. Initially specializing in electronic music such as alternative dance and industrial, the label expanded its roster to include pop, rock and numerous singer-songwriters. Nettwerk has played an impactful role in many artists' careers, such as Skinny Puppy, Coldplay, Sarah McLachlan, and Barenaked Ladies.

The label was named Billboard's "Indie Power Players" list in 2024 and 2025.

== History ==
In 1984, Terry McBride and his friend Mark Jowett attended—and both dropped out of—the University of British Columbia. As students, McBride studied civil engineering while Jowett took classes in creative writing, theater and English. The two met at a house party where Jowett's electronic music band Moev was performing.

Once out of college, McBride began managing Moev, for whom Jowett played guitar. Moev was signed to Go Records, a small San Francisco label that went bankrupt, leaving the band without distribution. McBride's small apartment became a hang out for their friends, which included members of the electro-industrial band Skinny Puppy; McBride and Jowett starting putting out their records, along with Moev's and The Grapes of Wrath. Along with McBride and Jowett, the other co-founders of Nettwerk consisted of Tom Ferris and Cal Stephenson (the other members of Moev at that point). Ferris and Stephenson operated Limited Vision Studio, primarily as Nettwerk's in-house studio.

Nettwerk Music Group officially opened its doors in 1984. Their first release was Moev's Toulyev EP, and the first non-Moev release was The Grapes of Wrath's self-titled EP (followed by their full-length, September Bowl of Green). It piqued the attention of Capitol Records, and paved the way for a distribution deal for the band and Nettwerk as a label in 1986. In 1986, Nettwerk brought on Ric Arboit as a third partner and managing director. Not long after, Ferris and Stephenson distanced themselves from Nettwerk's business dealings, while Jowett also departed from Moev to focus full-time on Nettwerk.

Despite having an eclectic initial roster of artists, Nettwerk gained a reputation as an industrial music label, an assumption bolstered by the label's roster of homegrown and licensed industrial acts including Skinny Puppy, Severed Heads, SPK, Manufacture, and Single Gun Theory. George Maniatis, one of the label's early promotion managers, observed that "Remission (Skinny Puppy's mini-album), which was one of our first releases, grabbed everybody by the you-know-whats... Because of it, everybody assumed we were just industrial dance. But we never set out in that direction—it's just that they hit first."

Regardless of the intent, the industrial dance and electronic genres proved lucrative and resulted in many international cross-licensing deals. Among them: Belgium's Play It Again Sam label running the Nettwerk Europe imprint in exchange for Nettwerk licensing Front 242 in Canada; licensing Tackhead's North American distribution rights from England's On-U Sound; and cross-licensing with Australia's Volition label which brought Severed Heads and Single Gun Theory to North America. Cross-licensing, including distribution through the majors (Capitol for Skinny Puppy and Atlantic for Moev), and respectable club chart performances (including singles by Manufacture, Severed Heads, and Moev) all contributed to significant visibility and growth for the label at the close of the 1980s.

The label's reputation as a strictly electronic dance imprint would soon change. At a show in Halifax, McBride met a 19-year-old singer-songwriter named Sarah McLachlan – he'd been introduced to her music through Jowett, and tried to recruit her to front Moev. Her parents initially rejected the idea, saying she was too young. Once she'd moved out of her parents' home and was in her first year of art school, McLachlan's career took off. McBride offered McLachlan a five-record deal, and she agreed, saying "Ok. Sure. Why not?"

In 1988, McBride and Jowett moved Nettwerk into a new office, and McLachlan relocated to Vancouver to write, finishing her debut, Touch. The first single, "Vox," was a hit, and led to her signing a worldwide deal with Arista Records (Nettwerk retained McLachlan's deal for Canada). She followed up with Solace in 1991 and Fumbling Towards Ecstasy in 1993. Surfacing in 1997 featured two hit singles: "Building a Mystery" and "I Will Remember You." McLachlan has won three Grammy Awards: Best Pop Instrumental Performance for "Last Dance," Best Female Pop Vocal Performance for "Building A Mystery" and Best Female Pop Vocal Performance for "I Will Remember You."

Lilith Fair was initially McLachlan's idea; she was tired of the standard touring, and wanted to do something different, something inventive. Though McBride was resistant at first, he pushed forward, and they assembled a lineup that they were told was "suicidal": Paula Cole, Aimee Mann, Patti Smith, Lisa Loeb and McLachlan to close. It was a success, and the next summer they launched a touring version; it grossed $16 million, a large portion of which was donated to women's charities. Founded by McLachlan, McBride, Nettwerk co-owner Dan Fraser and New York talent agent Marty Diamond, Lilith Fair was the top-grossing festival tour of 1997 and ranked 16th among the year's Top 100 Tours. In 1998, Lilith Fair grossed just over $6 million and remained the top-grossing summer concert package tour of the season.

In 1996, Nettwerk signed Barenaked Ladies, with McBride as manager. After steady radio promotion, McBride booked the band for a show at City Hall Plaza in Boston to launch their album Stunt; the concert drew 80,000 fans. The first single, "One Week," reached number one on the charts, and it earned the band a Grammy nomination and a Juno Award for Best Pop Album. They have since gone on to sell over 10 million albums.

In 1999, Nettwerk brought on Dido, as well as Sum 41. Avril Lavigne was sixteen when she walked into the Nettwerk offices; Arista sent her to McBride, to gauge whether she had a future as an artist. Though Lavigne would release her records through Arista, she continued with Nettwerk for her management.

In 2000, EMI decided against a North American release for Coldplay's debut album Parachutes, which was distributed by subsidiary Parlophone in the United Kingdom. This led Nettwerk to pick up the album and make it available in Canada and the United States.

From 2002 to 2004, Nettwerk release a series of Christmas compilations featuring many of its artists: Maybe This Christmas, Maybe This Christmas Too?, and Maybe This Christmas Tree.

Nettwerk was at the forefront of embracing what was then new digital formats. McBride studied reports showing the sea change in fan preference, and realized that he'd rather cater to the growing MP3 culture rather than work against it. In 2005, Nettmusic became one of the first major music companies to sell MP3s free of DRM (digital rights management), and supported the consumer case in the battle against the Recording Industry Association of America. Nettwerk offered to pay the legal fees of a teenager in Texas who was being sued by the RIAA.for downloading songs.

On the artist side, Nettwerk continued to focus on investing in talent as well as innovation for both artist-and-fan friendly models. McBride initiated "collapsed copyright," a new business model that empowered artists themselves and not just the corporations. Collapsed copyright allowed artists to release music under their own label (therefore retaining the intellectual property), marketed and promoted through Nettwerk. In 2013, Nettwerk raised $10.25 million in equity financing to sign artists and purchase catalogs. In 2023, Nettwerk brought on Flexpoint Ford as new strategic partners to support growth in the business, and invest further in artists and catalog acquisitions.

2024 heralded in Nettwerk's forty year anniversary. And in 2025, Nettwerk made Billboard's "The Indie Power Player" list for the second year in a row.

== Distribution ==
In 1994, Nettwerk switched its US distribution from Capitol–EMI to Sony Music, later Sony BMG. The distribution in Canada remained with EMI until end of 2005, when in 2006, distribution was handled through Sony BMG (and later, Sony Music in Canada until 2019.) On June 9, 2010, Nettwerk announced that it would move from a variety of distributors, including Sony Music, to a global distribution agreement with WMG's Alternative Distribution Alliance.

In July 2016, Nettwerk sold its publishing catalogue to Kobalt Investment Fund, an independent investment fund established in 2011. Nettwerk used the proceeds to invest in artists and, at the same time, entered into an agreement for Kobalt to administer Nettwerk's future publishing signings.

In the spring of 2022, Nettwerk completed a transition to independent distribution moving digital distribution in-house through a combination of direct licenses with DSPs and licenses through Merlin which operates as the digital music licensing partner for the world's leading independent labels and distributors.

Presently, physical distribution in the US is through AMPED Distribution and in Europe through Proper Music Group and Bertus.

== See also ==
- List of record labels

== Sources ==
- Ryan, Denise (2010). Nettwerk: 25 Years of Music We Love. John Wiley & Sons Canada, Ltd. ISBN 978-0-470-67844-2.
