= Mother Mother =

Canadian indie rock band

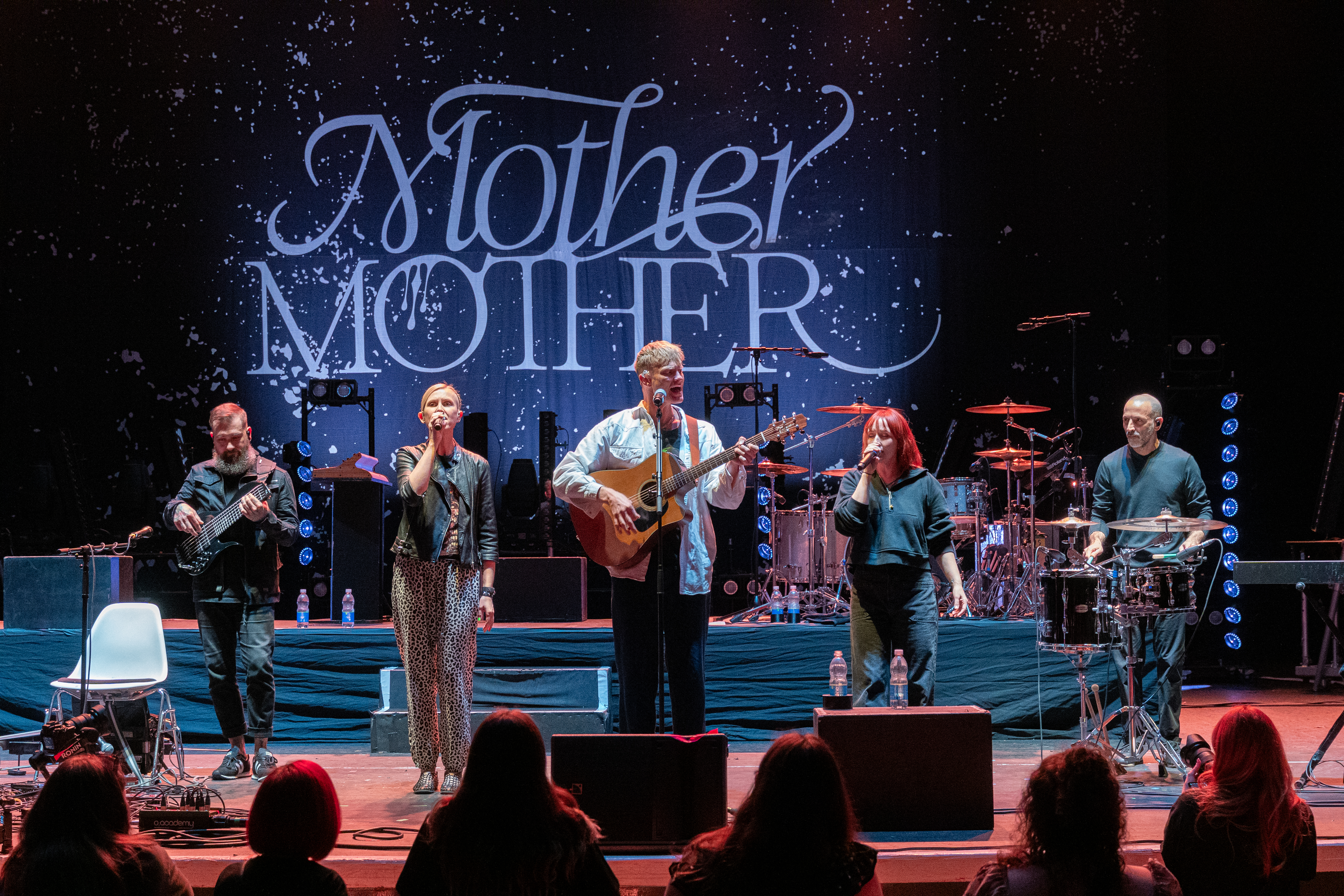
- Mother Mother performing at Brixton Academy, London, in 2025

Background information
- Origin: Quadra Island, British Columbia, Canada
- Genre: Indie rock
- Years active: 2005–present
- Labels: Last Gang; Island; Universal; Def Jam; Warner
- Members: Ryan Guldemond; Molly Guldemond; Ali Siadat; Jasmin Parkin; Mike Young
- Past members: Kenton Lowen; Debra-Jean Creelman; Jeremy Page
- Website: mothermothersite.com

Mother Mother is a Canadian indie rock band based on Quadra Island, British Columbia. The band consists of Ryan Guldemond on guitar and vocals, Molly Guldemond and Jasmin Parkin on vocals and keyboard, Ali Siadat on drums, and Mike Young on bass. Longtime bassist Jeremy Page left the band in 2016.

After forming in 2005, they independently released their self-titled debut album the same year under the name Mother, featuring a "Three headed rooster" as the cover art. They later changed their name to Mother Mother, and re-released the album on Last Gang Records in 2007, with the cover art as a "five headed rooster", retitled Touch Up. The reissue also featured several new songs.

The band's second album, O My Heart, was released on September 16, 2008; their third album, Eureka, was released on March 15, 2011; their fourth album, The Sticks, was released on September 18, 2012; and their fifth album, Very Good Bad Thing was released on November 4, 2014, with an American release of April 7, 2015, on Def Jam Recordings. Their sixth album, No Culture, was released on February 10, 2017, with yet another Def Jam Recordings release in the United States.

Their seventh album, Dance and Cry, was released on November 2, 2018. In late 2020, the band's music went viral on TikTok, causing a surge in streams. Their eighth studio album, Inside, was released on June 25, 2021, on Warner Brothers Music. On January 28, 2022, the band released a deluxe version of Inside, containing seven new songs. On February 16 2024, their ninth album, Grief Chapter, was released. Their tenth album, Nostalgia, was released on June 6, 2025.

== History ==
=== 2005–2006: Early career, Mother ===
The band began in Heriot Bay, British Columbia in January 2005, when guitarist and vocalist Ryan Guldemond was at music school and wanted to start a band based on vocal-driven pop songs. He recruited his sister Molly along with a friend from college, Debra-Jean Creelman, to accompany his own vocals for the songs he had written, and the trio played as an acoustic act before adding drummer Kenton Loewen and bassist Jeremy Page.

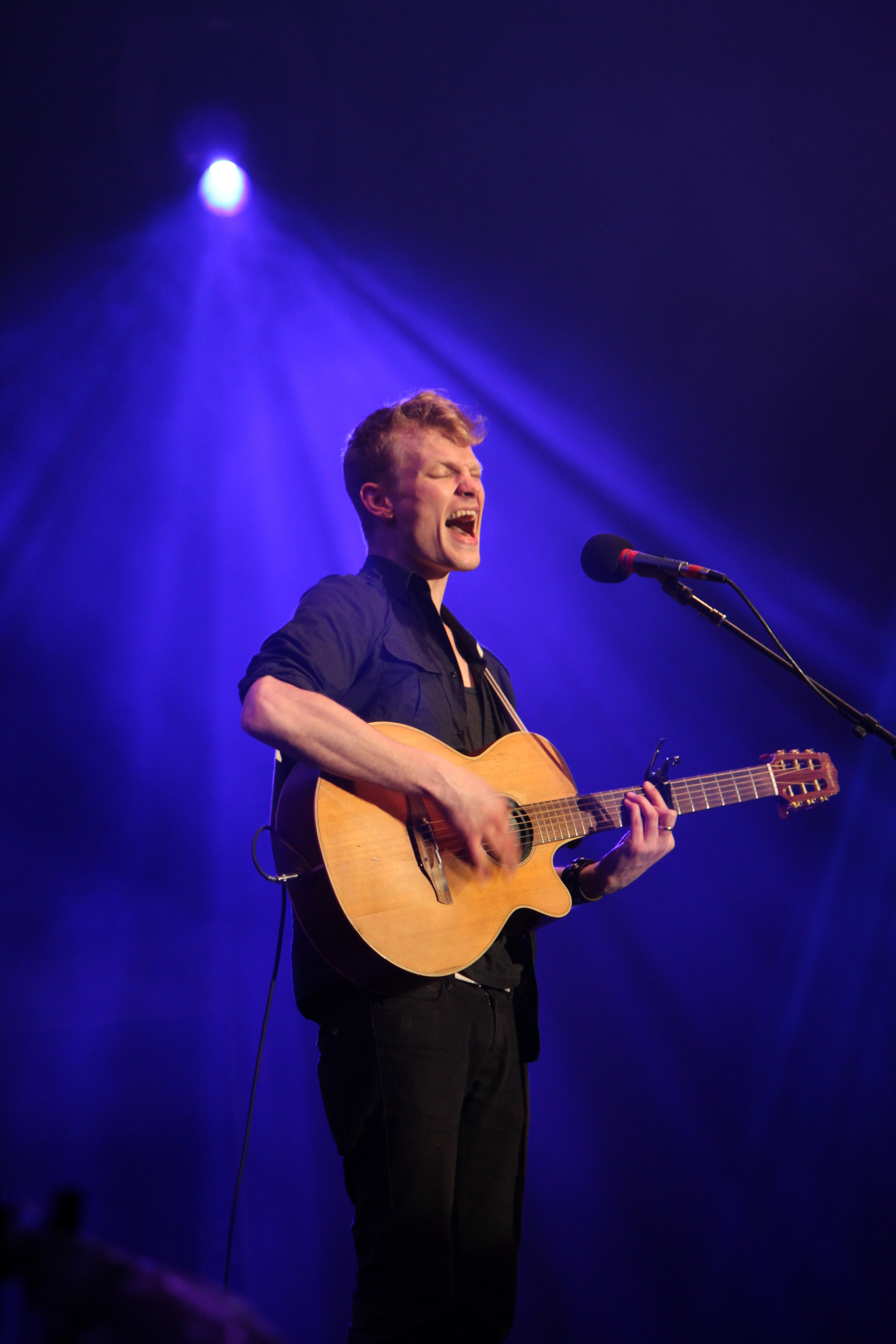
Ryan Guldemond

The five members started off playing under the name Mother, and in the fall of 2005, they independently released a self-titled album. This debut album was recorded with Howard Redekopp, who had also worked with the New Pornographers and Tegan and Sara. When the Vancouver Province rated Mother as one of the top five BC bands to watch for in 2007, they began to receive acclaim for their debut album. Shortly thereafter, Mother landed a nationally broadcast concert opening for K'naan and the Wailin' Jennys. In the summer of 2006, they opened for the Australian band The Cat Empire at the sold-out Vancouver International Jazz Festival. Later that year, they made their debut in central Canada at the Montreal International Jazz Festival on June 29 as well as in Toronto on July 1, Canada Day, at the Harbourfront Centre.

=== 2006–2012: Touch Up, O My Heart, and Eureka ===
In October 2006, after playing a set at the Pop Montreal festival, Mother met with Last Gang Records and later signed a four-album contract. At that point, the label encouraged the band to change their name to avoid legal issues, and they renamed themselves Mother Mother. On February 20, 2007, the band re-released its debut album under the new name, renaming the album Touch Up and including two new songs, as well as artwork and overdubs different from the original.

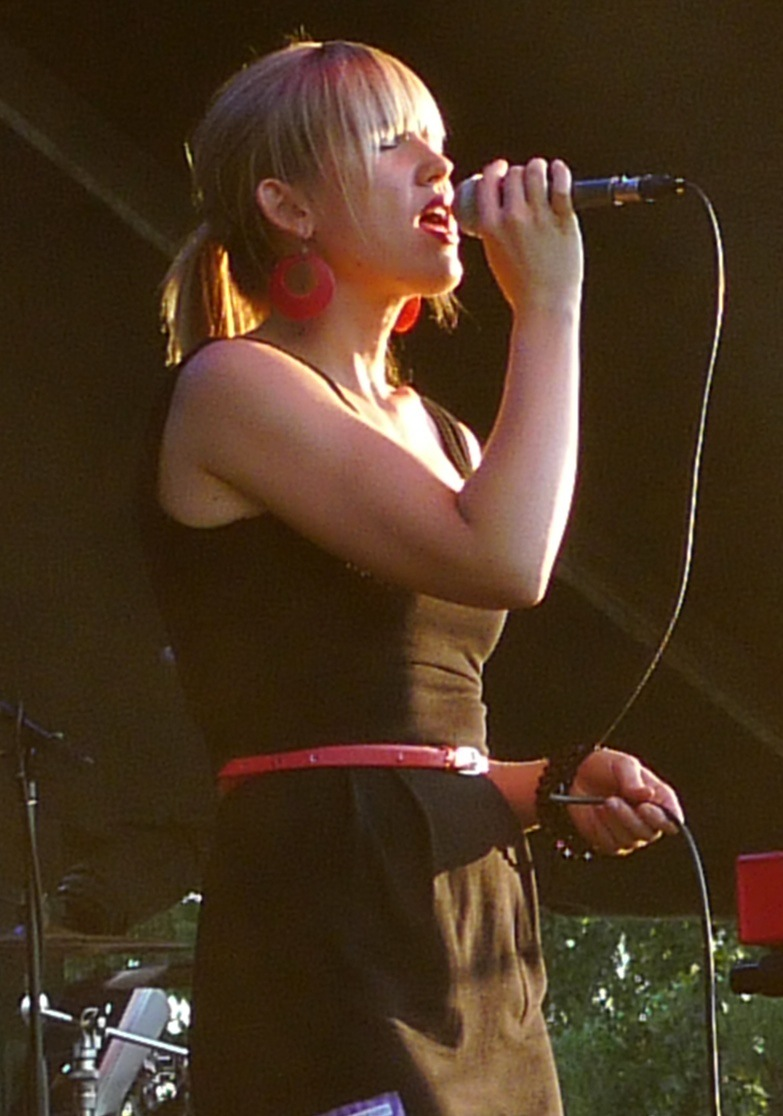
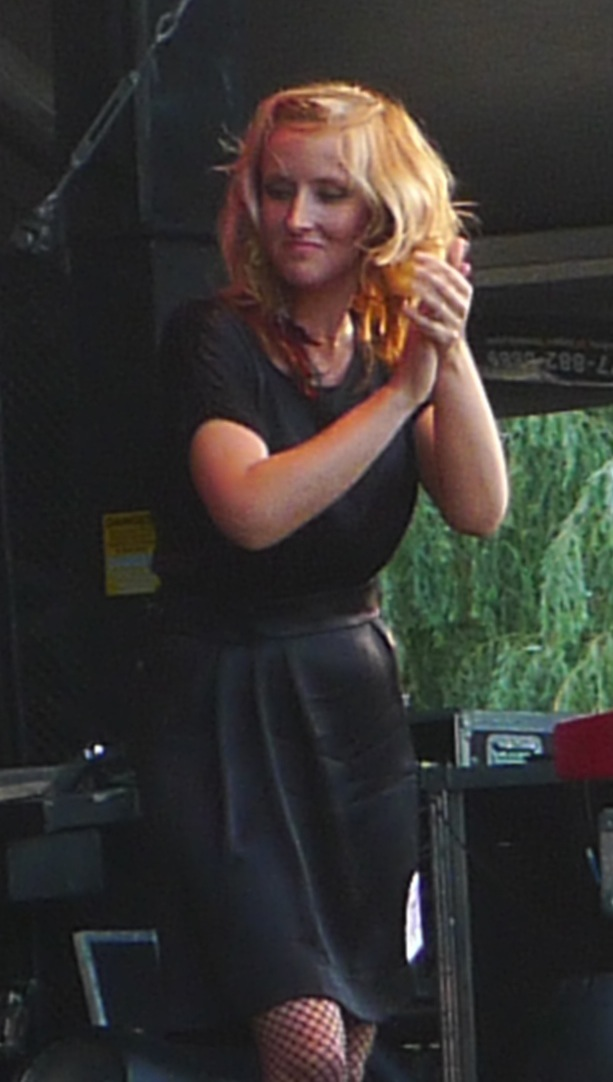
Molly Guldemond (left) and Jasmin Parkin (right) perform for British Columbia Day at Deer Lake Park on August 3, 2009.

The band released their second album, O My Heart, in 2008. Later that year, on December 3, it was announced that Debra-Jean Creelman had left Mother Mother; on January 26, 2009, the band announced the addition of a new singer/keyboardist, Jasmin Parkin.

Mother Mother's third album, Eureka, was released on March 15, 2011. The album's lead single, "The Stand", entered the Canada Singles Top 100 chart in May 2011 and peaked during that week at position 76. The album prompted a reviewer at the Toronto Star to describe the band as "evolving into orchestral harmonies and hip hop-influenced power ballads, as if Adam Lambert had joined The Dirty Projectors". This album has two bonus tracks; "In The Wings" and "Carve a Name."

On January 9, 2012, Kraft Foods launched a series of television commercials featuring the song "Bright Idea".

=== 2012–2018: The Sticks, Very Good Bad Thing, and No Culture ===
Mother Mother's fourth album, The Sticks, was released on September 18, 2012. It contains 14 tracks along with 2 bonus tracks "Cesspool of Love" and "All Gone," and was co-produced by the band frontman Ryan Guldemond and producer Ben Kaplan. The first single, "Let's Fall in Love", was released on July 17. They performed this song on their Canadian tour in 2012, playing in hometown Vancouver on December 19.

In 2014, the band signed with Universal Music Canada to produce their fifth album, Very Good Bad Thing, which was released on November 4, 2014. The first single from the album, "Get Out the Way" was released on July 15, 2014. The album contains 10 tracks and 2 bonus tracks: "No One To Nothing" and "Jump the Fence."

Mother Mother played the City of Brampton, Ontario's New Year's festivities at the end of 2016. On November 25, 2016, the band announced their Canadian No Culture Tour. Their tour began in New Brunswick in February 2017 and ended in British Columbia at the end of March 2017.

On February 10, 2017, their sixth album No Culture was released. The lead single from the album, "The Drugs", was released on November 4, 2016.

=== 2018–2022: Dance and Cry and Inside ===
On November 2, 2018, the band released their seventh studio album Dance and Cry. The first single from the album, "Get Up", was released on September 14, 2018. The band supported the album with the Dance and Cry tour, playing 26 shows across North America, starting on February 7, 2019, in Vancouver and ending March 16, 2019, in Buffalo, New York. The tour included a sold out show at New York's Gramercy Theatre.

Starting in late 2020, songs from their 2008 album, O My Heart, went viral on the video-sharing platform TikTok, causing their music to reach new streaming highs. The songs, in particular "Hayloft", "Arms Tonite", "Wrecking Ball" and "Burning Pile", became popular, with videos including cosplay and gothic fashion. Although no particular event caused the surge, the band's music did resonate with non-binary communities, as users played Mother Mother songs while discussing gender-related topics.

Lead vocalist, Ryan Guldemond, described the surge as a "high honor and huge compliment whenever it's suggested that our music might serve as an adequate soundtrack to a courageous journey of self-discovery that often rubs against societal norms". Guldemond further reiterated that their early music "really struggled to fit neatly into the industry standards of either a rock or pop format [...] I sang straight from my throat and had a much more androgynous tone. It was very rich with unisexual harmonies, as well as eccentric, quirky, daring lyrics. Perhaps it's just the right time for people to understand that music".

Although the band had not planned on making new music, in October 2020, they stated to Rolling Stone that they were completing their eighth album at The Warehouse Studio in Vancouver. Dubbed a "pandemic album", it would contain the "energy from the earlier catalog". On March 9, 2021, Mother Mother released the singles "I Got Love" and "Stay Behind". On April 8, 2021, Mother Mother announced their eighth studio album Inside, due for release on June 25 on Warner Brothers Music. The band also released a video for "I Got Love" made up of clips sent in by fans. They released their following single from Inside, "Sick of the Silence", on June 10, 2021. Alongside the release of Inside, the band announced the Canadian leg of the Inside tour, which began on December 2, 2021, in Vancouver and ended on May 20, 2022, in Ottawa.

The band released the deluxe version of Inside on January 28, 2022. It included the single, "Life," a sequel to their most popular song "Hayloft," a piano demo for the song "Like A Child" from the main album, and four other new songs.

In November 2022, Mother Mother released a single titled "Cry Christmas", along with a cover of "Have Yourself a Merry Little Christmas". The single was described by the band on Twitter as "a holiday song for the holiday-disenfranchised".

=== 2023–present: Grief Chapter, Mother EP, DEMMOS, and Nostalgia ===
In November 2023, Mother Mother announced the title and release date of their ninth album, Grief Chapter, as well as its tracklist. The 12-track album was released on February 16, 2024.

On September 28, 2024, Mother Mother released the Mother EP, an EP of tracks from Mother which had never been released on streaming platforms. A few months later, on November 14, Mother Mother released DEMMOS, an album containing previously unreleased song demos.

In early March 2025, Mother Mother announced and released a new single, Make Believe for their 20th year of making music. It is one of 12 tracks on their 10th studio album Nostalgia, which was released on June 6, 2025.

== Band members ==
Current

- Ryan Guldemond – lead vocals, guitar (2005–present), bass (2005–2006) percussion, synthesizers (2005–2007)
- Molly Guldemond – vocals, keyboards, synthesizers (2005–present)
- Ali Siadat – drums, percussion (2008–present)
- Jasmin Parkin – vocals, keyboards (2009–present)
- Mike Young – bass guitar, keyboards (2016–present)

Former

- Debra-Jean Creelman – vocals, keyboards, piano (2005–2009)
- Kenton Loewen – drums, percussion (2006–2008)
- Jeremy Page – bass guitar, clarinet, saxophone (2006–2016)

Timeline

== Discography ==
Studio albums

- Touch Up (2007)
- O My Heart (2008)
- Eureka (2011)
- The Sticks (2012)
- Very Good Bad Thing (2014)
- No Culture (2017)
- Dance and Cry (2018)
- Inside (2021)
- Grief Chapter (2024)
- Nostalgia (2025)
