= Ryan Guldemond =

Canadian musician

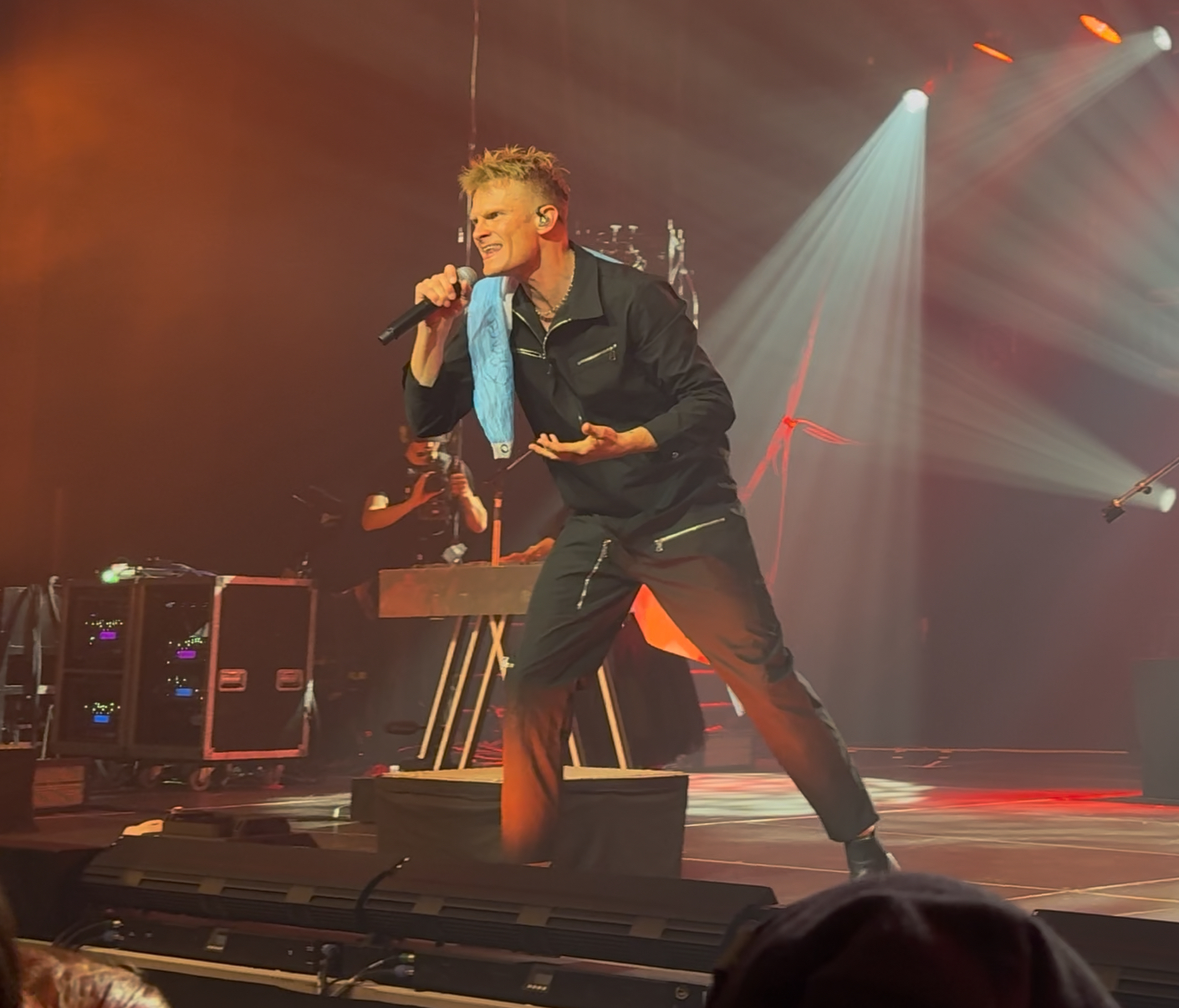
- Ryan Guldemond performing with Mother Mother in Moncton, New Brunswick in 2025

Background information
- Born: Ryan Lee Guldemond; November 24, 1983 (age 42)
- Origin: British Columbia, Canada
- Genres: Indie rock, alternative rock
- Occupation: Musician
- Instruments: Guitar, vocals
- Years active: 2005–present
- Label: Last Gang
- Website: mothermothersite.com

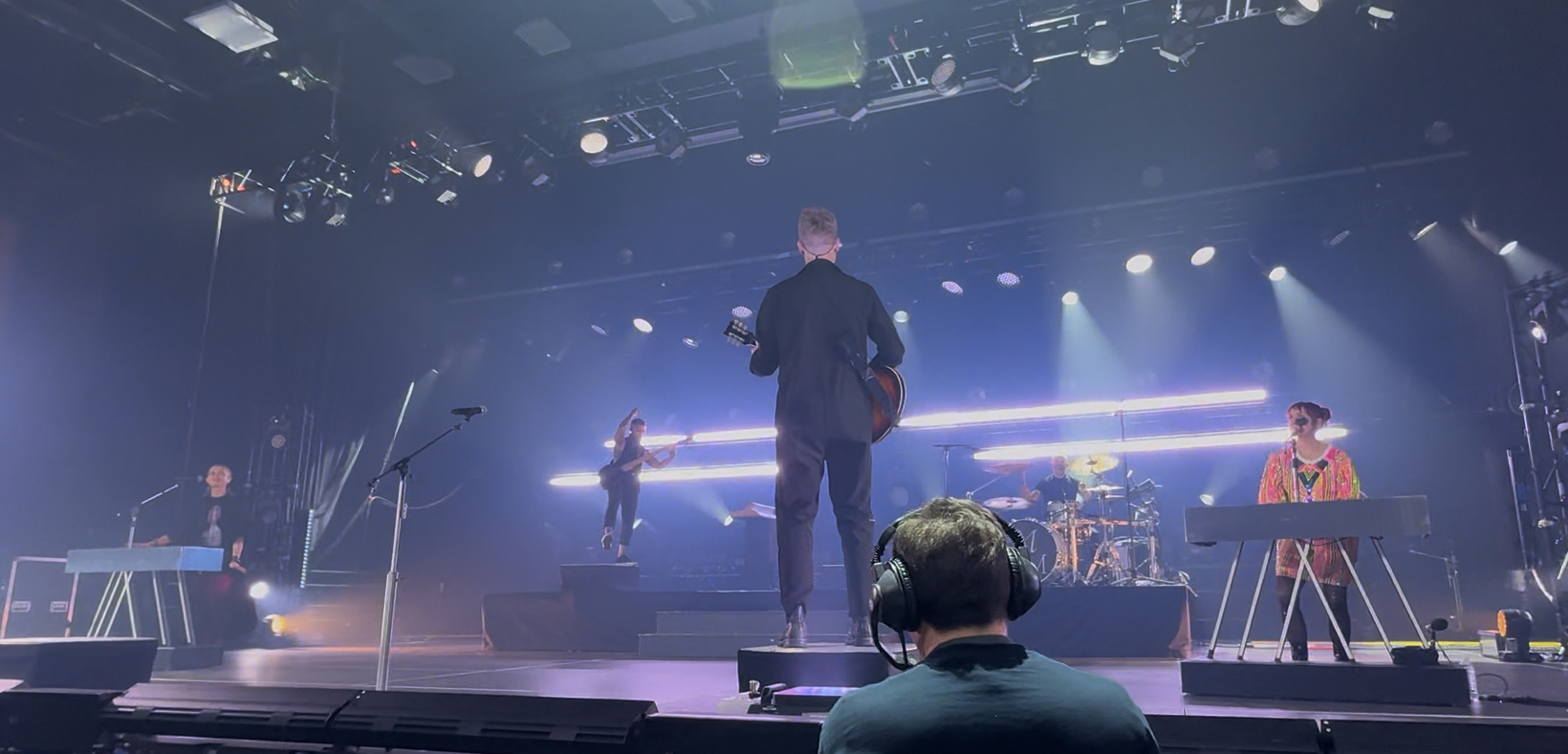
Mother Mother performing in Moncton, New Brunswick

Ryan Lee Guldemond (born November 24, 1983) is the lead vocalist, songwriter and guitarist of the Canadian indie rock band Mother Mother, which he formed on Quadra Island, British Columbia with his sister Molly Guldemond (on vocals and keyboard).

== Early life ==
Guldemond grew up on Quadra Island in British Columbia, with sister and bandmate, Molly. The siblings did not play music together in their youth, only deciding to start a band as adults. Guldemond has described working through issues with substance use and has noted that in the past these issues have negatively impacted his relationship with Molly, though their relationship has strengthened post-sobriety. He has discussed sobriety as an important influence on Mother Mother's sixth album, No Culture, particularly the single "The Drugs".

== Career ==
At music school, Guldemond decided to start a band based on vocal-driven pop songs. He recruited his sister, Molly, along with a friend from college, Debra-Jean Creelman, to accompany his vocals for the songs they had written. The trio played as an acoustic act in Vancouver in January 2005 before adding drummer Kenton Loewen and bassist Jeremy Page to form Mother, a 5-member band.

In late 2005, they independently released a self-titled album. Later, in October 2006, the name of the band was amended to Mother Mother.

Guldemond played an unnamed character in the movie Hot Tub Time Machine alongside ex-Mother Mother bandmate Jeremy Page.

Guldemond is also an experienced music producer, having worked with Hannah Georgas on her album, This Is Good.

In 2022, Guldemond started his solo project GLDMTH (pronounced "gold mouth"), focusing on acoustic songs with lyrics portraying beauty in everyday life. In August 2022, Guldemond released the single "The People" followed shortly by a self-titled LP.
