= List of songs written by Jimmy Webb =

The following is a chronological list of recordings and performances of songs written by Jimmy Webb.

Year	Artist	Album	Song(s)	Label
1965	The Contessas	single	"This Is Where I Came In" "I Keep On Keepin' On"	E Records
1965	The Supremes	Merry Christmas	"My Christmas Tree"	Motown Records
1965	Brenda Holloway	single	"This Time Last Summer"	Motown Records
1965	Danny Day	single	"Please Don't Turn The Lights Out" "This Time Last Summer"	Motown Records
1966	Billy Eckstine	My Way	"I Did It All for You"	Motown Records
1966	Al Waples and the Incredibles	single	"Moving On"	Audio Arts
1966	Don Ray Sampson	single	"Take It Easy"	E Records
1966	Johnny Rivers	Changes	"By the Time I Get to Phoenix"	Soul City Records
1967	Strawberry Children	single	"Love Years Coming" "One Stands Here"	Soul City Records
1967	Johnny Rivers	Rewind	"Do What You Gotta Do" "Carpet Man" "Sidewalk Song" "Sweet Smiling Children" "The Eleventh Song" "Rosecrans Boulevard" "Tunesmith"	Soul City Records
1967	Vikki Carr	It Must Be Him	"Tunesmith"	Liberty
1967	The 5th Dimension	Up, Up, and Away	"Up, Up and Away" "Which Way to Nowhere" "Never Gonna Be the Same" "Pattern People" "Rosecrans Boulevard"	Soul City Records
1967	The 5th Dimension	The Magic Garden	"Prologue" "Magic Garden" "Summer's Daughter" "Dreams/Pax/Nepenthe" "Carpet Man" "Requiem: 820 Latham" "The Girls' Song" "The Worst That Could Happen" "Orange Air" "Paper Cup" "Epilogue"	Soul City Records
1967	Nancy Sinatra	Movin' with Nancy	"Up, Up and Away"	Reprise Records
1967	Jimmy Webb	Jim Webb Sings Jim Webb	"I Keep It Hid" "You're So Young" "I'll Be Back" "Life is Hard" "I Need You" "Our Time is Running Out" "I Can Do It on My Own" "Then" "I'm In Need" "Run, Run, Run"	Epic Records
1967	Glen Campbell	By the Time I Get to Phoenix	"By the Time I Get to Phoenix"	Capitol Records
1968	Ed Ames	single	"All My Love's Laughter"	RCA Victor Records
1968	The Vogues	Turn Around, Look at Me	"I Keep It Hid" "Then"	Reprise Records
1968	Diana Ross & The Supremes	Reflections	"Up, Up, And Away"	Motown Records
1968	Dusty Springfield	cancelled single/"If You Go Away" (EP)	"Magic Garden"	Philips Records
1968	Jimmy Webb	single	"One of the Nicer Things" "I Don't Want This Modern Religion"	Dunhill Records
1968	Richard Harris	A Tramp Shining	"Didn't We" "Paper Chase" "Name of My Sorrow" "Lovers Such As I" "In the Final Hours" "MacArthur Park" "Dancing Girl" "If You Must Leave My Life" "A Tramp Shining"	Dunhill Records
1968	Richard Harris	The Yard Went On Forever	"The Yard Went On Forever" "Interim" "Watermark" "Gayla" "The Hymns From Grand Terrace" "The Hive" "Lucky Me" "That's the Way It Was"	Dunhill Records
1968	Richard Harris	single	"One of the Nicer Things"	Dunhill Records
1968	Clarence Carter	This Is Clarence Carter	"Do What You Gotta Do"	
1968	Al Wilson (singer)	Searching for the Dolphins	"Do What You Gotta Do"	Soul City
1968	Jefferson	Colour of My Love	"Montage" "Do What You Gotta Do"	Pye Records
1968	Bud Shank	Magical Mystery	"Paper Cup"	
1968	Walter Wanderley	When It Was Done	"When It Was Done"	
1968	Ronnie Kole Trio	New Orleans' Newest Sound	"Galveston"	
1968	The Brooklyn Bridge	The Brooklyn Bridge	"Which Way to Nowhere" "Requiem" "The Worst That Could Happen"	
1968	Picardy Singers	How Sweet It Is	"How Sweet It Is" "Montage"	
1968	The Love Generation	single	"Montage"	
1968	Peggy Lipton	single	"Red Clay County Line"	
1968	Glen Campbell	Wichita Lineman	"Wichita Lineman"	Capitol Records
1968	Frank Sinatra	Cycles	"By the Time I Get to Phoenix"	Reprise Records
1968	Frank Sinatra	The Sinatra Family Wish You a Merry Christmas	"Whatever Happened to Christmas"	Reprise Records
1968	Nina Simone	'Nuff Said!	"Do What You Gotta Do"	RCA Records
1968	Bobby Vee	Do What You Gotta Do	"Do What You Gotta Do"	
1968	The 5th Dimension	Stoned Soul Picnic	"The Eleventh Song (What a Groovy Day!)"	
1969	Glen Campbell	Galveston	"Galveston" "Where's the Playground Susie"	Capitol Records
1969	Thelma Houston	Sunshower	"Sunshower" (from His Own Dark City) "Everybody Gets to Go to the Moon" "To Make It Easier on You" "Didn't We" "Mixed-Up Girl" "Someone is Standing Outside" "This is Where I Came In" "Pocketful of Keys" "This is Your Life" "Cheap Lovin" "If This Was the Last Song"	Dunhill Records
1969	Waylon Jennings	single	"MacArthur Park"	
1969	Jimmy Webb	How Sweet It Is (Soundtrack)	"Tell Them Willie Boy Is Here"	
1969	B. J. Thomas	"If You Must Leave My Life" "Do What You Gotta Do"	Sceptre	
1969	The 5th Dimension	The Age of Aquarius	"The Hideaway"	
1969	Frank Sinatra	My Way	"Didn't We"	Reprise Records
1969	Johnny Mann Singers	Goodnight My Love	"One Stands Here"	
1969	Fortunes	That Same Old Feeling	"Someone Is Standing Outside" "Red Clay County Line" "Clowns Exit Laughing"	
1969	The Executives	single	"Parenthesis"	
1969	The Executives	On Bandstand	"Requiem: 820 Latham"	
1969	The Match	A New Light	"Love Years Coming"	
1969	The Four Tops	single	"Do What You Gotta Do"	
1969	The Mike Perjanik Complex	single	"She Never Smiles Anymore"	
1969	Barbra Streisand	What About Today?	"Little Tin Soldier"	Columbia Records
1969	Jimmy Webb	The Golden Songs of Jimmy Webb (song book)	"Fair Weather Lover" "Halfway in the Middle" "Here I'll Stand" "How Can You Do It" "I Can't Leave You All Alone" "I Don't Need You" "I Think Were Gonna Make It Baby" "If You Leave Me" "In My Wildest Dreams" "I'll Be Back when Winter's Gone" "Lost Generation" "Love Now, Mainlainer" "Mirror Mind" "Moving On" "Parenthesis" "Plow this Ground" "Psalm for the Semi-living" "Shadows of Summer" "The Girl who Needs Me" "Summer Lovers" "There Aint No Doubt" "When Eddie Comes Home" "When I'm Dead" "World Made of Windows"	
1969	Walter Wanderley	Moondreams	"One Of The Nicer Things" "5:30 Plane"	CTI Records
1969	Sergio Mendes And Brasil 66	What The World Needs Now	"Wichita Lineman"	A & M Records
1970	Diana Ross & The Supremes	Farewell	"Didn't We"	Motown Records
1970	Jimmy Webb	Words and Music	"Sleepin in the Daytime" "P.F. Sloan" "Love Song" "Careless Weed" "Psalm 150" "Songseller" "Dorothy Chandler Blues" "Jerusalem" "Once Before I Die"	Reprise Records
1970	Glen Campbell	Try a Little Kindness	"Honey Come Back"	Capitol Records
1970	Buddy Emmons	Suite Steel	"Wichita Lineman"	
1970	Revelation	Revelation	"Jerusalem" "This Is Your Life" "Paper Chase" "Pocketful of Keys" "One of the Nicer Things" "Beyond Myself" "See You Then" "If This Was The Last Song" "Shepherd's Daughter" "Evie" "Someone is Standing Outside" "Psalm 150"	Mercury Records
1970	Glen Campbell	The Glen Campbell Goodtime Album	"MacArthur Park" "Just Another Piece of Paper"	
1970	Ray Charles	Love Country Style	"I Keep it Hid"	
1970	Connie Stevens	single	"5:30 Plane"	
1970	Mark Lindsay	You've Got a Friend	"Old Man at the Fair"	
1970	Mark Lindsay	Arizona	"First Hymn from Grand Terrace" "The Name of My Sorrow"	
1970	Judy Mayhan	Moments	"Old Man at the Fair"	
1970	Hugo Montenegro	Colors Of Love	"When It Was Done"	
1970	Tommy Overstreet	single	"The Smartest Fool"	
1970	Roberta Flack	Chapter Two	"Do What You Gotta Do"	
1970	Sammy Davis, Jr	Sammy Steps Out	"Do What You Gotta Do"	Reprise Records
1970	Jimmy Webb	The Jimmy Webb Songbook	"Gypsy Moths" "I Think the Last One was the One" "Love Years Coming" "One of the Kind" "Right Here Where You Left Me" "Summer Will End" "That World of Yours" "You'll Be Back, I Know It"	
1970	The 5th Dimension	Portrait	"This is Your Life"	
1970	The Temptations	The Temptations Christmas Card	"My Christmas Tree"	Motown Records
1970	Judy Singh	A Time for Love	"Everybody Gets to Go to the Moon"	CBC Canada
1970	Nancy Wilson	Can't Take My Eyes Off You	"Mixed Up Girl"	Capitol Records
1970	Cissy Houston	Cissy Houston	"Didn't We"	Janus Records
1971	Jimmy Webb	And So: On	"Met Her on a Plane" "All Night Show" "All My Love's Laughter" "Highpockets" "Marionette" "Laspitch" "One Lady" "If Ships Were Made to Sail" "Pocketful of Keys" "See You Then"	Reprise Records
1971	Dianne Davidson	Baby	"Clowns Exit Laughing"	
1971	The Association	Stop Your Motor	"P.F. Sloan"	Warner Bros.
1971	Vikki Carr	Vikki Carr's Love Story	"I Keep It Hid"	
1971	Richard Harris	My Boy	"Beth" "Sidewalk-song" "Requiem" "This Is Where I Came In"	
1971	Tom Jones	Sings She's a Lady	"Do What You Gotta Do"	
1971	Jackie Trent	Everybody Gets To Go To The Moon	"Words & Music"	
1972	Jimmy Webb	Letters	"Galveston" "Campo de Encino" "Simile" "Hurt Me Well" "Once in the Morning" "Catharsis" "Song Seller" "When Can Brown Begin" "Piano"	Reprise Records
1971	Roberta Flack	Quiet Fire	"See You Then"	
1972	The Supremes	The Supremes Produced and Arranged by Jimmy Webb	"5:30 Plane" "Where Can Brown Begin" "Beyond Myself" "Once in the Morning" "I Keep It Hid" "Cheap Lovin"	Motown Records
1972	B. J. Thomas	Billy Joe Thomas	"A Song For My Brother"	Scepter Records
1972	Dusty Springfield	See All Her Faces	"Mixed-Up Girl"	Philips Records
1972	The Fortunes	Storm In A Teacup	"Red Lay County Line" "Someone Is Standing Outside"	
1972	Barbra Streisand	Live Concert at the Forum	"Didn't We"	Columbia Records
1972	Dionne Warwick	From Within	"MacArthur Park"	
1972	Cass Elliot	The Road Is No Place for a Lady	"Saturday Suit"	
1972	Harry Nilsson	Son of Schmilsson	"Campo de Encino"	RCA Records
1972	Alice Clark	Alice Clark	"I Keep It Hid"	Mainstream Records
1973	Jimmy Webb	The Naked Ape (soundtrack)	"9 A.M." "D Minor Toccata" "Nake Ape Theme: Ape Inventory" "Carnivorock" "Arnie's Letter" "Cathy's Theme: Pair-Bonding" "Saturday Suit" (Jimmy Webb vocals) "Fingerpainting" (Jimmy Webb vocals) "You Brought a New Kind of Love to Me" "Jesus Loves Me" "Survival Rag" "Gymnasts Ballet" "Arnie's Appeasement" "Elephant Hunt" "Naked Ape Theme: How Like an Angel"	
1973	Art Garfunkel	Angel Clare	"All I Know" "Another Lullaby"	Columbia Records
1973	Scott Walker	Any Day Now	"All My Love's Laughter" "If Ships Were Made to Sail"	Philips Records
1973	Maurice Long	Sanctified	"One Stands Here"	Paramount
1973	Scott Walker	Stretch	"Where Does Brown Begin"	Columbia
1973	Matt Monro	For The Present	"Didn't We"	Columbia/EMI Records
1973	Richard Harris	Richard Harris' Greatest Performances	"Lovers Such as I" "One of the Nicer Things"	
1974	Jimmy Webb	Land's End	"Ocean in his Eyes" "Walk Your Feet in the Sunshine" "Cloudman" "Lady Fits Her Bluejeans" "Just This One Time" "Crying in My Sleep" "It's a Sin" "Alyce Blue Gown" "Land's End"/ "Asleep on the Wind"	Asylum Records
1974	Joe Cocker	I Can Stand a Little Rain	"The Moon Is a Harsh Mistress" "It's a Sin When You Love Somebody"	A&M Records
1974	Glen Campbell	Reunion: The Songs of Jimmy Webb	"Just This One Time" "You Might as Well Smile" "Wishing Now" "Ocean in His Eyes" "The Moon Is a Harsh Mistress" "I Keep it Hid" "Adoration" "It's a Sin"	Capitol Records
1974	Johnny Rivers	Road	"See You Then"	
1974	Nancy Wilson	All In Love Is Fair	"To Make It Easier On You"	Capitol Records
1975	The 5th Dimension	Earthbound (produced and arranged by Jimmy Webb)	"Earthbound" (prologue) "Lean On Me Always" "Feet In The Sunshine" "When Did I Lose Your Love" "Speaking With My Heart" "Earthbound" (epilogue)	
1975	Nancy Wilson	Come Get to This	"This Time Last Summer"	
1975	Cher	Stars (produced by Jimmy Webb)	"Just This One Time"	
1975	Judy Collins	Judith	"The Moon Is a Harsh Mistress"	Elektra Records
1975	Kerrie Biddell	Only The Beginning	"Parenthesis"	EMI
1976	Glen Campbell	Bloodline	"Christiaan No"	
1976	Waylon Jennings	Are You Ready for the Country	"MacArthur Park (Revisited)"	RCA Victor
1977	Jimmy Webb	El Mirage	"Highwayman" "If You See Me Getting Smaller" "Mixed Up Guy" "Christiaan No" "Moment in a Shadow" "Sugarbird" "Where the Universes Are" "PF Sloan" "The Moon Is a Harsh Mistress" "Skylark (A Meditation)"	Atlantic Records
1977	Glen Campbell	Southern Nights	"This is Sarah's Song" "Early Morning Song"	Capitol Records
1977	Waylon Jennings	Ol' Waylon	"If You See Me Getting Smaller"	
1977	Glen Campbell	Live at the Royal Festival Hall	"MacArthur Park" "By the Time I Get to Phoenix" "Galveston" "Wichita Lineman" "This is Sarah's Song"	Capitol Records
1977	Art Garfunkel	Watermark	"Crying in My Sleep" "Marionette" "Shine It On Me" "Watermark" "Saturday Suit" "All My Love's Laughter" "Mr. Shuck n Jive" "Paper Chase" "Someone Else (1958)" "Wooden Planes"	Columbia Records
1977	Cher and Gregg Allman	Two the Hard Way	"Do What You Gotta Do"	Warner Bros.
1978	Donna Summer	single	"MacArthur Park"	Casablanca Records
1979	Jimmy Webb	Voices (soundtrack)	"I Will Always Wait for You" "Rosemarie's Theme" "Disco If You Want To" "Children's Song" "Family Theme" "I Will Always Wait for You" "On a Stage" "Across the River" "Rosemarie and Drew" "Children's Song" (instrumental) "Drunk as a Punk" "Children's Song" (instrumental) "Rosemarie's Dance"/ "I Will Always Wait for You" (reprise)	
1979	Lowell George	Thanks, I'll Eat It Here	"Himmler's Ring"	
1979	Glen Campbell	Highwayman	"Highwayman" "Love Song"	Capitol Records
1980	Thelma Houston	Breakwater Cat	"Before There Could Be Me" "Breakwater Cat" "Gone" "Long Lasting Love" "What Was that Song"	
1980	Leah Kunkel	I Run with Trouble	"Never Gonna Lose My Dream of Love Again" "Let's Begin"	
1980	Bob Dylan	live performance	"Let's Begin"	
1980	Tanya Tucker	Dream Lovers	"Tennessee Woman"	
1980	Johny Logan	Johny Logan	"Slippin' Away"	
1981	Art Garfunkel	Scissors Cut	"Scissors Cut" "In Cars" "That's All I've Got to Say"	Columbia Records
1981	Jimmy Webb and America	The Last Unicorn (soundtrack)	"The Last Unicorn" "Man's Road" "In the Sea" "Now That I'm a Woman" "That's All I've Got to Say" "The Last Unicorn Part 2" "Forest Awakens" "Red Soup" "Red Bull Attacks" "The Cat" "The Tree" "Haggard's Unicorns" "Bull-Unicorn-Woman" "Unicorns in the Sea" "Unicorn and Lear"	
1981	Arlo Guthrie	Power of Love	"Oklahoma Nights"	
1981	Glen Campbell	It's The World Gone Crazy	"In Cars"	
1982	Linda Ronstadt	Get Closer	"The Moon Is a Harsh Mistress" "Easy for You to Say"	
1982	Joe Cocker	Sheffield Steel	"Just Like Always"	
1982	The Everly Brothers	Living Legends	"She Never Smiles Anymore"	
1982	Jimmy Webb	Angel Heart	"Angel Heart" "His World" "Ol' Wing Mouth" "In Cars" "Our Movie" "Work for a Dollar" "Nasty Love" "Scissors Cut" "God's Gift"	
1982	Glen Campbell	Old Home Town	"I Was Too Busy Loving You"	
1982	Waylon Jennings and Willie Nelson	WWII	"Mr. Shuck and Jive"	
1985	Glen Campbell	It's Just a Matter of Time	"Cowboy Hall of Fame" "Do What You Gotta Do" "Shattered"	
1986	Nick Cave and the Bad Seeds	Kicking Against The Pricks	By the Time I Get to Phoenix	Mute Records
1985	The Highwaymen	Highwayman	"The Highwayman"	
1985	Susannah McCorkle	How Do you Keep The Music Playing?	"By The Time I Get To Phoenix"	The Jazz Alliance
1986	Art Garfunkel and Amy Grant	The Animals' Christmas	"The Annunciation" "The Creatures of the Field" "Just a Simple Little Tune" "The Decree" "Incredible Phat" "The Friendly Beasts" "The Song of the Camels" "Word from an Old Spanish Carol" "Carol of the Birds" "The Frog" "Herod" "Wild Geese"	Columbia Records
1987	Glen Campbell	Still Within the Sound of My Voice	"Still Within the Sound of My Voice" "For Sure, For Certain, Forever, For Always"	MCA Records
1988	Toto	The Seventh One	"Home of the Brave"	
1988	Kenny Rankin	Hiding in Myself	"She Moves, Eyes Follow"	
1988	Glen Campbell	Light Years	"Light Years" "Lightning In A Bottle" "Saturday Night" "More Than Enough" "Almost Alright Again" "Brand New Eyes" "Our Movie" "If These Walls Could Speak"	MCA Records
1988	Amy Grant	Lead Me On	"If These Walls Could Speak"	A&M Records
1988	Patti Austin	The Real Me	"Someone Is Standing Outside"	Qwest Records
1989	Linda Ronstadt	Cry Like a Rainstorm, Howl Like the Wind	"Still Within the Sound of My Voice" (piano by Jimmy Webb) "Adios" (arrangement by Jimmy Webb) "I Keep It Hid" (piano by Jimmy Webb) "Shattered"	Elektra Records
1990	John Denver	The Flower That Shattered the Stone	"Postcard from Paris"	Windstar Records
1991	Kenny Rogers	Back Home Again	"They Just Don't Make 'Em Like You Anymore"	Reprise Records
1991	Glen Campbell	Show Me Your Way	"Where I Am Going" "The Four Horsemen"	New Haven
1992	Jimmy Webb	Instant Intimacy (musical)	"Other People's Lives" "Wasn't There a Moment" "Instant Intimacy" "It Only Takes One Guy to Tap" "Two Women" "That's How a Lady Learns to Flirt" "What Does a Woman See in a Man" "Defiance" "Boat People Are Beautiful" "Yours for the Taking" "I Don't Know How to Love You Anymore" "Close By" "Is There Love After You"	
1992	Sheena Easton	FernGully: The Last Rainforest (soundtrack)	"A Dream Worth Keeping"	MCA Records
1992	Greg Kihn	Kihn Of Hearts	"Do What You Gotta Do"	Riot Records
1993	David Crosby	Thousand Roads	"Too Young to Die"	Atlantic Records
1993	Jimmy Webb	Suspending Disbelief	"Too Young to Die" "I Don't Know How to Love Her Anymore" "Elvis and Me" "It Won't Bring Her Back" "Sandy Cove" "Friends to Burn" "What Does a Woman See in a Man" "Postcard from Paris" "Just Like Always" "Adios" "I Will Arise"/ "I'll Fly Away"	Elektra Records
1993	Michael Feinstein	Forever	"Time Enough for Love"	Elektra Records
1993	Art Garfunkel	Up 'til Now	"All I Know" "Skywriter" "The Decree" "All My Love's Laughter"	Columbia Records
1993	Linda Ronstadt	Winter Light	"Do What You Gotta Do" "You Can't Treat the Wrong Man Right"	Elektra Records
1993	Glen Campbell	Wings of Victory	"Only One Life" "I Will Arise"	Intersound Records
1994	Jimmy Webb	In Their Own Words, Volume One	"Wichita Lineman"	Razor & Tie
1994	Nanci Griffith	Red, Hot & Country	"If These Walls Could Speak"	Mercury Records
1994	Rosemary Clooney	Demi-Centennial	"Time Flies"	Concord Records
1994	Shawn Colvin	Cover Girl	"If These Walls Could Speak"	Columbia Records
1995	Michael Feinstein	Such Sweet Sorrow	"Wasn't There a Moment"	Atlantic Records
1995	Scud Mountain Boys	Dance the Night Away	"Where's The Playground, Susie"	Chunk Records
1995	Scud Mountain Boys	Pine Box	"Wichita Lineman"	Chunk Records
1995	Jimmy Webb	live performance	"Snow-Covered Christmas"	
1995	Zumpano	Look What the Rookie Did	"Rosecrans Boulevard"	Sub Pop
1996	Jimmy Webb	Ten Easy Pieces	"Galveston" "Highwayman" "Wichita Lineman" "The Moon's a Harsh Mistress" "By the Time I Get to Phoenix" "If These Walls Could Speak" "Didn't We" "Worst That Could Happen" "All I Know" "McArthur Park"	Guardian Records
1996	R.E.M.	single	"Wichita Lineman" (live)	Warner Bros. Records
1997	Carly Simon	Film Noir	"Film Noir"	Arista Records
1997	Christine Andreas	Love Is Good	"The Moon's A Harsh Mistress"	After 9 Records
1999	Patti LuPone	Matters of the Heart	"Where Love Resides"	Varèse Sarabande
2001	Liz Callaway	The Beat Goes On	"Didn't We/MacArthur Park"	Varese Sarabande
2002	Diana Ross	Diana Ross (reissue)	The Interim	Motown Records
2003	Michael Feinstein	Only One Life: The Songs of Jimmy Webb	"After All The Loves Of My Life"/ "Only One Life" "Didn't We" "Belmont Avenue" "Up, Up And Away" "She Moves, Eyes Follow" "All I Know" "The Moon's a Harsh Mistress" "Adios" "Skywriter" "Is There Love After You?" "Louisa Blu" "Time Flies" "These Are All Mine" "Piano" "Only One Life"	Concord Records
2004	Louise Pitre	Shattered	"Sandy Cove" "Is There Life After You" "Shattered"	Orange Records
2005	Jimmy Webb	Twilight of the Renegades	"Paul Gauguin in the South Seas" "Skywriter" "Why Do I Have to Make You Say You Love Me" "Class Clown" "Spanish Radio" "Time Flies" "How Quickly" "High Rent Ghetto" "She Moves and Eyes Follow" "Just Like Marylin" "No Signs of Age" "Driftwood" "Right as Rain" (bonus track)	Sanctuary Records
2006	Aimee Mann	One More Drifter in the Snow	"Whatever Happened to Christmas"	SuperEgo
2006	Sparklehorse	Dreamt for Light Years in the Belly of a Mountain	"Galveston"	Astralwerks
2007	Jimmy Webb	Live and at Large	"Paul Gauguin in the South Seas" "No Signs of Age" "Highwayman" "Campo de Encino" "Galveston" "Lightning in a Bottle" "All I Know" "Didn't We" "Wichita Lineman" "Time Flies" "MacArthur Park"	The Jimmy Webb Music Company
2008	Carly Simon	This Kind of Love	"This Kind of Love" "Hola Soleil" "In My Dreams" "The Last Samba"	Hear Music
2008	Jimmy Webb	Born to the Breed: A Tribute to Judy Collins	"Fallow Way"	Wildflower
2008	Maureen McGovern	A Long And Winding Road	"MacArthur Park" "The Moon's A Harsh Mistress"	PS Classics
2009	Jimmy Webb and The Webb Brothers	Cottonwood Farm	"Highwayman" "Cottonwood Farm" "If These Walls Could Speak" "Where the Universes Are" "A Snow Covered Christmas"	Proper Records
2010	Jimmy Webb	Just Across the River	"Oklahoma Nights" (featuring Vince Gill) "Wichita Lineman" (featuring Billy Joel and Jerry Douglas) "If You See Me Getting Smaller" (featuring Willie Nelson) "Galveston" (featuring Lucinda Williams) "P.F. Sloane" (featuring Jackson Browne) "By The Time I Get to Phoenix" (featuring Glen Campbell) "Cowboy Hall Of Fame" "Where Words End" (featuring Michael McDonald) "The Highwayman" (featuring Mark Knopfler) "I Was Too Busy Loving You" (featuring J.D. Souther) "It Won't Bring Her Back" "Do What You Gotta Do" "All I Know" (featuring Linda Ronstadt)	E1 Music
2010	Doug Howell	Jimmy & Me	"All I Know" "Met Him on a Plane" "Simile" "Shattered" "Skywriter" "Wooden Planes" "When Can Brown Begin" "If Ships Were Made to Sail" "Shine It on Me" "Lightning in a Bottle" "Another Lullaby"	Creative Measures LLC
2011	Nikki Jean	Pennies in a Jar	"China"	S-Curve Records
2011	Glen Campbell	Ghost on the Canvas (bonus track)	"Wish You Were Here" ("Postcard from Paris")	Surfdog Records
2011	Judy Collins	Bohemian	"Campo de Encino"	Wildflower Records
2011	America	Back Pages	"Crying In My Sleep"	eOne
2011	Nick Haywood Quartet	1234	"The Moon's a Harsh Mistress"	Jazzhead
2012	Rumer	Boys Don't Cry	"P.F. Sloan"	Atlantic Records
2012	Barbra Streisand	Release Me	"Didn't We"	Columbia Records
2013	Josh Groban	All That Echoes	"The Moon's a Harsh Mistress"	Reprise
2013	Jimmy Webb	Still Within the Sound of My Voice	"Sleepin' in the Daytime" (featuring Lyle Lovett) "Easy for You to Say" (featuring Carly Simon) "Elvis and Me" (featuring The Jordanaires) "Where's the Playground, Susie?" (featuring Keith Urban) "Still Within the Sound of My Voice" (featuring Rumer) "If These Walls Could Speak" (featuring David Crosby and Graham Nash) "The Moons a Harsh Mistress" (featuring Joe Cocker) "Another Lullaby" (featuring Marc Cohn) "You Can't Treat the Wrong Man Right" (featuring Justin Currie) "Rider from Nowhere" (featuring America) "Honey Come Back" (featuring Kris Kristofferson) "Adios" (featuring Amy Grant) "MacArthur Park" (featuring Brian Wilson) "Shattered" (featuring Art Garfunkel)	E1 Music
2014	Albert Lee	Highwayman	"The Highwayman"	Palm Bridge
2014	Shirley Bassey	Hello Like Before	"MacArthur Park"	Palm Bridge
2015	Neal Morse	The Grand Experiment	"MacArthur Park"	InsideOut Records
2015	Darlene Love	Introducing Darlene Love	Who Under Heaven	Columbia Records
2016	Villagers	Where Have You Been All My Life?	"Wichita Lineman"	Domino Records
2017	Glen Campbell	Adiós	"Just Like Always" "It Won't Bring Her Back" "Postcard From Paris" "Adios"	Universal Music LLC
2019	Michael Ball	Coming Home to You	"When The Loving Was Easy"	Decca Records
2020	Thelma Houston and Jimmy Webb	single	"Someone Is Standing Outside"	
