= The Very Best of Ed Ames =

Compilation album by Ed Ames
- Released: July 10, 2001
- Studios: RCA's Music Center of the World, Hollywood, California
- Genres: Pop; easy listening
- Label: RCA Victor
- Producers: Jim Foglesong; Paul Williams
- Compiler: Joseph F. Laredo

Ed Ames chronology
The Very Best of Ed Ames (Taragon) (2000)	The Very Best of Ed Ames (2001)

Singles from The Very Best of Ed Ames
- 1. "Try To Remember" Released: December 1964; 2. "My Cup Runneth Over" Released: November 1966; 3. "Time, Time" Released: April 1967; 4. "When the Snow Is on the Roses" Released: September 1967; 5. "Who Will Answer?" Released: December 1967; 6. "Apologize" Released: April 1968; 7. "All My Love's Laughter" Released: July 1968; 8. "Kiss Her Now" Released: October 1968; 9. "Changing, Changing" Released: February 1969; 10. "Son of a Travelin' Man" Released: April 1969; 11. "Leave Them a Flower" Released: September 1969; 12. "A Thing Called Love" Released: November 1969

The Very Best of Ed Ames is a compilation album by American pop singer Ed Ames. It was released in July 2001 via RCA Victor and was the fourth compilation album of his career. The Very Best of Ed Ames contained 14 tracks, including multiple singles by Ames that topped the Billboard Easy Listening chart, and received pop sales as well. The album received positive reviews from several reviewers.

== Background, recording, and release ==
Ed Ames had been a recording artist for the RCA Victor label since the 1950s, during his time in the Ames Brothers vocal group. In 1966, his solo career took off with the hit "My Cup Runneth Over". He continued to have hit singles and best-selling albums. The songs included on The Very Best of Ed Ames were originally recorded at RCA's Music Center of the World, located in Hollywood, California. All of them were produced by Jim Foglesong. Arrangements were provided by Al Capps, Jimmy Wisner, Jimmie Haskell, Artie Butler, and Perry Botkin Jr.. Claus Ogerman is credited with conducting "Try to Remember". Most tracks were classified as contemporary and easy listening. The Very Best of Ed Ames was originally released in July 2001 by RCA Victor. It was available only on CD. Almost two decades later, it was rereleased to digital streaming platforms.

== Critical reception ==
Greg Adams on AllMusic stated that "The Very Best of Ed Ames offers a fine retrospective of the mightiest baritone in pop music," noted that the album "might seem like a skimpy anthology with only 14 tracks, but it is an excellent distillation of this classic pop singer's solo recordings." Adams believed that the album "covers most of Ames' big hits and concentrates on broadly appealing material like 'My Cup Runneth Over' and the antiwar song 'Who Will Answer?'"

== Chart performance and singles ==
A total of twelve singles and two album tracks were included on The Very Best of Ed Ames. The most recent single on the album was "A Thing Called Love", released in 1969 by Ames, it was later made popular by Johnny Cash. It became a top-40 single on America's Billboard adult contemporary chart, rising to the number 21 position. In Canada, it was listed at similar positions on the adult-oriented chart, but the single reached the pop charts as well, peaking at No. 65 on the RPM Top 100 Singles chart.

The first single was his first solo success, "Try to Remember". It became a success on the easy listening charts, reaching the top-20, and scraped the pop charts as well. The main highlight was the second single released at the end of 1966, "My Cup Runneth Over", which topped the easy listening charts, and reached the top-10 on the pop charts in both the US and Canada; his only single to have achieved this success. Four other well-charting singles were released in 1967 and 1968, "Time, Time," "When the Snow Is on the Roses," "Who Will Answer?," "Apologize". Another Broadway themed single was released in October 1968, titled "Kiss Her Now" from the musical Dear World. "Changing, Changing" and "Leave Them a Flower" were message-oriented singles released in early and late 1969, both reaching the Easy Listening chart. "Son of a Travelin' Man" was Ames' final Billboard Hot 100 entry.

== Track listing ==
Compact disc
No.	Title	Writer(s)	Length
1.	"My Cup Runneth Over"	Harvey Schmidt; Tom Jones	2:44
2.	"Try to Remember"	Harvey Schmidt; Tom Jones	3:57
3.	"All My Love's Laughter"	Jimmy Webb	2:43
4.	"Time, Time"	Renato Canfora; Giuseppe Baselli; Mort Shuman	2:50
5.	"They Call the Wind Maria"	Alan Jay Lerner; Frederick Loewe	2:54
6.	"Thing Called Love"	Jerry Hubbard	2:45
7.	"Who Will Answer? (Aleluya No. 1)"	Luis Eduardo Aute; Sheila Davis	3:40
8.	"Apologize"	Jimmy Griffin; Michael Z. Gordon	2:04
9.	"Son of a Travelin' Man"	Mauro Lusini; Robert Allen	2:45
10.	"Kiss Her Now"	Jerry Herman	2:08
11.	"There's a Kind of Hush (All Over the World)"	Geoff Stephens; Les Reed	2:50
12.	"Changing, Changing"	Sheila Davis	3:19
13.	"Leave Them a Flower"	Wally Whyton	2:55
14.	"When the Snow Is on the Roses"	Eddie Snyder; Ernst Bader; James Last; Larry Kusik	2:45
Total length:			40:19

== Personnel ==
All credits are adapted from the liner notes of The Very Best of Ed Ames.

- Ed Ames – vocals
- Jim Foglesong – producer
- Claus Ogerman, (tracks: 2) – conductor
- Perry Botkin Jr., (tracks: 1 to 5, 7 to 8, 10 to 12, 14) – arranger, conductor
- Artie Butler, (tracks: 9) – arranger, conductor
- Al Capps, (tracks: 6) – arranger, conductor
- Jimmie Haskell, (tracks: 13) – arranger, conductor
- Frank Harkins – art direction
- Paul Williams – compilation producer
- Joseph F. Laredo – compiled by
- JRJ Associates, Inc. – design
- Joseph F. Laredo – liner notes
- BMG Entertainment Archives – photography
- Bill Lacey – restoration
- Mike Hartry – transferred by
