= The Best of Glen Campbell =

Greatest hits album by Glen Campbell
- Released: October 1976
- Genre: Country
- Length: 36:21
- Label: Capitol
- Producer: Al De Lory, Jimmy Bowen, Dennis Lambert, Brian Potter

Professional ratings
Review scores
Source	Rating
Allmusic	link

After Glen Campbell's Greatest Hits (1971), The Best of Glen Campbell was the second of official Capitol compilation albums by Glen Campbell and was released in 1976.

== Track listing ==
Side 1:

1. "Rhinestone Cowboy" (Larry Weiss) - 3:15
2. "Gentle On My Mind" (John Hartford) - 2:59
3. "Wichita Lineman" (Jimmy Webb) - 3:07
4. "Galveston" (Jimmy Webb) - 2:42
5. "Houston (I'm Comin' To See You)" (David Paich) - 3:21
6. "Country Boy (You Got Your Feet In L.A.)" (Dennis Lambert, Brian Potter) - 3:08

Side 2:

1. "By The Time I Get To Phoenix" (Jimmy Webb) - 2:45
2. "The Last Time I Saw Her" (Gordon Lightfoot) - 4:08
3. "Try A Little Kindness" (C. Sapaugh, B. Austin) - 2:27
4. "It's Only Make Believe" (Conway Twitty, Jack Nance) - 2:28
5. "I Knew Jesus (Before He Was A Star)" (N. Hefti, S. Styne) - 2:54
6. "The Moon Is a Harsh Mistress" (Jimmy Webb) - 3:07

== Production ==
- Producers - Al De Lory, Jimmy Bowen, Dennis Lambert, Brian Potter
- Art direction - Roy Kohara
- Photography - Kenny Rogers

== Charts ==
Album - Billboard (United States)

Chart	Entry date	Peak position	No. of weeks
Billboard Country Albums	11/20/1976	11	24
