= El Mirage =

El Mirage may refer to:

- El Mirage, Arizona, a city in Maricopa County, Arizona, United States
- El Mirage Dry Lake, a dry lake bed in the Mojave Desert, California, United States
- El Mirage (album), the fifth solo album by Jimmy Webb
- El Mirage, California, an unincorporated community in San Bernardino County, California, United States
