= Highwayman (song) =

Song written by American singer-songwriter Jimmy Webb, first recorded in 1977

"Highwayman" is a song written by American singer-songwriter Jimmy Webb about a soul with incarnations in four different places in time and history: as a highwayman, a sailor, a construction worker on the Hoover Dam, and finally as a captain of a starship. Webb first recorded the song on his album El Mirage, released in May 1977. The following year, Glen Campbell recorded his version on his 1979 album Highwayman.

In 1985, the song became the inspiration for the naming of the supergroup the Highwaymen, which featured Johnny Cash, Waylon Jennings, Willie Nelson, and Kris Kristofferson. Their first album, Highwayman, became a number one platinum-selling album, and their version of the song went to number one on the Hot Country Songs Billboard chart in a 20-week run. Their version earned Webb a Grammy Award for Best Country Song in 1986. The song has since been recorded by other artists. Webb himself included a different version on his 1996 album Ten Easy Pieces, a live version on his 2007 album Live and at Large, a version with his sons (Christiaan, Justin and James) The Webb Brothers on their 2009 album Cottonwood Farm, and a duet version with Mark Knopfler on the 2010 album Just Across the River.

== Composition ==
According to Webb, he wrote the song in London while he was finishing up work on his album El Mirage. After a late-night round of "professional drinking" with his friend Harry Nilsson, Webb went to sleep and had "an incredibly vivid dream":

I had an old brace of pistols in my belt and I was riding, hell-bent for leather, down these country roads, with sweat pouring off of my body. I was terrified because I was being pursued by police, who were on the verge of shooting me. It was very real. I sat up in bed, sweating through my pajamas. Without even thinking about it, I stumbled out of bed to the piano and started playing "Highwayman". Within a couple of hours, I had the first verse.

Webb included the phrasing in the line "Along the coach roads I did ride" to convey a kind of "antique way of speaking". Not sure of where the song was leading him, Webb realized that the highwayman character does not die, but becomes reincarnated, and the three subsequent verses evolve from that idea. In the second verse he becomes a sailor, in the third verse a dam builder, and in the fourth verse Webb switches to future tense and the character becomes an astronaut who will someday "fly a starship across the universe divide".

== Versions ==
=== Jimmy Webb version ===
Webb's version of the song was first released on the album El Mirage in May 1977.

=== Glen Campbell version ===
Webb then brought the song to Glen Campbell, who recorded it in 1978. Campbell eventually released the song on his album Highwayman in October 1979.

=== The Highwaymen version ===
"Highwayman"

Single by the Highwaymen

from the album Highwayman
- B-side: "The Human Condition"
- Released: May 6, 1985
- Recorded: 1984
- Genre: Country
- Length: 3:06
- Label: Columbia
- Songwriter: Jimmy Webb
- Producer: Chips Moman

The Highwaymen singles chronology
"Highwayman" (1985)	"Desperados Waiting for a Train" (1985)

Audio sample
- file; help

In 1984, Campbell played the song "Highwayman" for Johnny Cash, who was making a quartet album with Willie Nelson, Waylon Jennings, and Kris Kristofferson. A few years earlier, Webb brought the song to Jennings, but Jennings, having heard the Campbell version, said "I just couldn't see it then". The four were all together in Switzerland doing a television special and decided that they should do a project together. While the four were recording their first album, Marty Stuart again played the song for Cash, saying it would be perfect for them—four verses, four souls, and four of them. Campbell then played the song again, this time to all four of them, and the quartet had the name for their new supergroup, the Highwaymen, the name of their first album, Highwayman, and the name of their first single. The four thought it was a perfect name for them because they were always on the road and all four had the image of being outlaws in country music.

In the Highwaymen's version of the song, each of the four verses was sung by a different performer: first Nelson as the highwayman, then Kristofferson as the sailor, then Jennings as the dam builder, and finally Cash as the starship captain. Webb later observed, "I don't know how they decided who would take which verse, but having Johnny last was like having God singing your song."

A black-and-white music video was released, which used actors to re-enact the song's lyrics, including the deaths of the first three characters. Each of the performers is seen briefly in the sky singing a few lines, as their segment of the song concludes. Footage of the canceled Northrop F-20 Tigershark fighter jet is featured in the video, and the video wraps up with the faces of Jennings, Nelson, Cash and Kristofferson lined up, similar to the presidents on Mount Rushmore.

Their cover of the Webb song remains the most popular and widely known of the Highwaymen's songs. The version by the quartet entered the Hot Country Songs Billboard chart on May 18, 1985, rose to number 1 and spent 20 weeks total on the chart. It finished 1985 as the number 5 country song of the year in terms of airplay.

==== Chart positions ====
Chart (1985)	Peak position
US Hot Country Songs (Billboard)	1
Canadian RPM Country Tracks	1
Canadian RPM Adult Contemporary Tracks	19

==== Certifications ====
Certifications for Highwayman
Region	Certification	Certified units/sales
United Kingdom (BPI)	Silver	200,000^{‡}
New Zealand (RMNZ)	Gold	15,000^{‡}
^{‡} Sales+streaming figures based on certification alone.

==== Awards ====
The Highwaymen's version of the song earned songwriter Jimmy Webb a Grammy Award for 1985's "Best Country Song".

== The Highwomen ==
When Brandi Carlile, Natalie Hemby, Maren Morris, and Amanda Shires formed the female supergroup The Highwomen in homage to the Nelson–Jennings–Cash–Kristofferson supergroup, they opened their eponymous 2019 debut album with Shires and Carlile adapting Webb's lyrics (with his blessing and assistance) as a response song reflecting how women throughout history often sacrifice themselves for a greater good, illustrating this with a Honduran immigrant who dies getting her children over the border (sung by Carlile), a healer executed for witchcraft (Shires), a freedom rider (guest vocals from Yola), and a preacher (Hemby).
