= Maroon (The Webb Brothers album) =

Studio album by the Webb Brothers
- Released: June 1, 2000
- Genre: Orchestral pop; indie rock
- Length: 43:35
- Label: Atlantic
- Producer: Stephen Street

The Webb Brothers chronology
| Beyond the Biosphere (1999) | Maroon (2000) | The Webb Brothers (2003) |

Maroon is the second studio album by American band the Webb Brothers, released through Atlantic Records on June 1, 2000. It was produced by Stephen Street. The singles "Summer People" and "I Can't Believe You're Gone" reached numbers 115 and 69 respectively in the UK, while the album reached number 105 on the UK Albums Chart.

== Critical reception ==
Professional ratings
Review scores
| Source | Rating |
|---|---|
| AllMusic | 4.5/5 stars |

Writing for AllMusic, Daniel Browne commented that the album is "full of soaring choruses and orchestral backdrops that might as well have been inspired by Tunesmith, Webb the Elder's giant treatise on the art of song", judging their "subject matter" to be "the lifestyle of carefree (and careless) swingers, and they capture it in spare, acidic lyrics that are almost the opposite of their father's grandiloquence". Browne acclaimed the album's "eclecticism, along with the jaded, wasted character of the lyrics", comparing it to Rufus Wainwright's Poses (2001), "another breakthrough album by a second-generation songwriter".

Keith Phipps of The A.V. Club felt that while the Webb Brothers' "perspective remains dour throughout" the album, it "comes cloaked in songs so instantly ingratiating that it's not hard to overlook the sadness just below the surface", opining that Maroon "captures a band with no shortage of methods for converting misery into melody". Phipps also complimented Stephen Street's "crisp production [that] gives the Webbs a solid base for their ambitious, eclectic songwriting".

In a glance at the band's career, Magnet called the album the "knockout left-hook to the chin" after the "right-cross to the heart" that was the band's debut, Beyond the Biosphere (1999). Brian Garrity of Billboard summarized Maroon as a "smart collection of California-style orchestral-pop fused with Elvis Costello sensibilities" and a "loose chronicle of the brothers' time spent playing in the Chicago music scene of the mid-1990s" that is "steeped in a weary decadence". Spin felt similarly, describing the record as a "piano-driven waltz with the ghosts of drugs, alcohol, and loneliness, variously evocative of Elvis Costello, Elliott Smith, and even Wilco, with melodic/harmonic roots in the Beatles". An overview in Mother Jones found the album to be an "introspective and kaleidoscopic collection of irresistibly textured pop symphonies".

== Track listing ==
All tracks are written by Justin and Christiaan Webb

Maroon track listing
| No. | Title | Length |
|---|---|---|
| 1. | "The Liar's Club" | 3:47 |
| 2. | "I Can't Believe You're Gone" | 3:48 |
| 3. | "All the Cocaine in the World" | 1:36 |
| 4. | "Summer People" | 4:01 |
| 5. | "Low Grade Fever" | 3:30 |
| 6. | "Marooned" | 3:33 |
| 7. | "Intermission" | 1:17 |
| 8. | "Fluorescent Lights" | 3:18 |
| 9. | "In a Fashion" | 3:36 |
| 10. | "Suddenly Awake" | 3:46 |
| 11. | "Powder Pale" | 3:47 |
| 12. | "Are You Happy Now?" | 3:09 |
| 13. | "Sleep If You Can" | 4:27 |
| Total length: | | 43:35 |

Japanese and digital bonus tracks
| No. | Title | Length |
|---|---|---|
| 14. | "Bad Weather" | 5:02 |
| 15. | "Nostalgia" | 2:57 |
| Total length: | | 51:34 |

== Charts ==
Chart performance for Maroon
| Chart (2000) | Peak position |
|---|---|
| UK Albums (OCC) | 105 |
