= All I Know =

Single by Art Garfunkel

from the album Angel Clare
- B-side: "Mary Was an Only Child"
- Released: 1973
- Genre: Orchestral pop
- Length: 3:43
- Label: Columbia
- Songwriter: Jimmy Webb

Art Garfunkel singles chronology
"Forgive Me" (1973)	"All I Know" (1973)	"I Shall Sing" (1973)

"All I Know" is a song written by American songwriter Jimmy Webb, first recorded by Art Garfunkel on his 1973 debut solo album, Angel Clare, released by Columbia Records. Instrumental backing was provided by members of the Wrecking Crew, L.A. session musicians. Garfunkel's version is the best known and highest-charting version, peaking at number nine on the Billboard Hot 100 and number one on the Easy Listening chart for four weeks in October 1973. Garfunkel's version begins with a solo piano, before he begins to sing. When the orchestration is beginning to fade out, the solo piano takes over, playing melodic passages to the song's end.

== Reception ==
In his review for Allmusic, Joe Viglione wrote that Jimmy Webb's own version of the song, recorded for Ten Easy Pieces in 1996, had "none of the gloss" of Garfunkel's hit version, but more soul. Viglione continued:

The stark reading retains the elegance of the hit version while giving the melody a new setting, aided by the saxophone of Pat Perez and the backing vocals of producer Fred Mollin and arranger Matt McCauley. Jimmy Webb has a more earthy tone to his voice and, as beautiful as Art Garfunkel's rendition is, there's much more sincerity when the composer talk/sings it over his piano.

== Chart history ==
=== Weekly charts ===
Chart (1973)	Peak position
Australia (Kent Music Report)	36
Canada RPM Adult Contemporary	1
Canada RPM Top Singles	7
New Zealand (Listener)	17
U.S. Billboard Hot 100	9
U.S. Billboard Adult Contemporary	1
U.S. Cash Box Top 100	6

=== Year-end charts ===
Chart (1973)	Rank
Canada	103
U.S. (Joel Whitburn's Pop Annual)	88
U.S. Cash Box	88

=== The Linda Ronstadt connection ===
More recently, Webb invited Linda Ronstadt to join him in a duet version for his 2010 album Just Across the River. Ronstadt had just announced her retirement from singing when Webb sent her an email describing his new CD of duets. Webb asked if she would sing "All I Know" with him, with just a guitar backup. Ronstadt called him and said, "Damn it, you've gotten me interested in that song." Webb later recalled, "There was a poignancy to that moment ... because I didn’t know if she'd ever sing again. Her voice sounds elegantly beautiful on 'All I Know' ... I loved the meticulous way she covered my voice."

=== Elsewhere in popular culture ===
The song continues to appear in popular culture. It was featured in the season 2 finale and the series finale of the American drama series Nip/Tuck.

Garfunkel's second rendition of the song was also used in a video montage in the ending credits of "The Grass Is Always Greener," Episode 12 in Season 3 of the American comedy-drama series Boy Meets World.

== Recorded versions ==
- Art Garfunkel on his album Angel Clare (1973)
- Art Garfunkel on his album Up 'til Now (1993)
- Amy Holland and Michael McDonald on the soundtrack album One Life to Live (1994)
- Jimmy Webb on his album Ten Easy Pieces (1996)
- Michael Feinstein on his album Only One Life: The Songs of Jimmy Webb (2003)
- Five for Fighting on the soundtrack album Chicken Little (2005)
- Jimmy Webb on his album Live and at Large (2007)
- Alan Cumming on his album I Bought a Blue Car Today (2009)
- Jimmy Webb and Linda Ronstadt on the album Just Across the River (2010)

== See also ==
- List of number-one adult contemporary singles of 1973 (U.S.)
