= Words and Music (Jimmy Webb album) =

Studio album by Jimmy Webb
- Released: November 1970
- Recorded: 1970
- Studios: MCA Studios, Universal City, California
- Genre: Pop
- Length: 43:37
- Label: Reprise
- Producer: Jimmy Webb

Jimmy Webb chronology
Jim Webb Sings Jim Webb (1968)	Words and Music (1970)	And So: On (1971)

Singles from Words and Music
- 1. "P.F. Sloan" Released: December 1970

Words and Music is the second album by American singer-songwriter Jimmy Webb, released in 1970 by Reprise Records. This was the first album authorized by the artist.

== Background ==
By 1970, Webb had achieved a measure of fame as a songwriter. From 1967 to 1970, his songs had given him two dozen entries on the Billboard Hot 100, among them several Top Ten hits, including "MacArthur Park" by Richard Harris, "Worst That Could Happen" by the Brooklyn Bridge, "Wichita Lineman" by Glen Campbell, "Galveston" by Glen Campbell and "Up, Up and Away" by the 5th Dimension. "By the Time I Get to Phoenix" was recorded by numerous artists. These hit songs made him a favorite of middle-of-the-road pop singers like Tony Bennett, Tom Jones, Dean Martin, Frank Sinatra, Dionne Warwick and Andy Williams. He was also widely covered by easy listening artists like Ray Conniff, Percy Faith, Henry Mancini and Lawrence Welk. By the late 1960s, the music industry had changed, and many songwriters were now singing their own compositions. Following the unpleasant experience of his first album, Jim Webb Sings Jim Webb—which consisted of demos that were overdubbed and released by Epic Records without his permission in 1968—Webb began performing his own material. Words and Music was Webb's first album that he produced, consisting of all new material.

== Production ==
In contrast to the full orchestral productions of many of Webb's 1960s hit songs, Words and Music presents the artist in a less elaborate framework. The album was recorded largely alone with guitarist Fred Tackett, who also overdubbed bass, percussion, and trumpet. Traces of Webb's earlier style can still be heard, notably in the horn chart for "Sleepin' in the Daytime" which echoed that of Richard Harris' "MacArthur Park" and in the elongated song structures, employing multiple tempos.

== Composition ==
The centerpiece of the album is "P.F. Sloan", a song about the costs and disappointments of being a creative groundbreaker. The song would later be covered by the Association, Unicorn, Jennifer Warnes and Rumer. Webb himself would rerecord the song for El Mirage in 1977, and again for Just Across the River in 2010 with Jackson Browne.

== Critical reception ==
Professional ratings
Review scores
Source	Rating
Allmusic	3.5/5 stars

In his review for AllMusic, William Ruhlmann noted that the album "contained songwriting more concerned with personal expression than craftsmanship." He judged Webb's singing to be much less polished than most of the singers who performed his songs, but more technically accomplished than some of the most renowned singer-songwriters he was competing against.

== Track listing ==
All tracks are written by Jimmy Webb, except where noted.

No.	Title	Writer(s)	Length
1.	"Sleepin' in the Daytime"		5:03
2.	"P.F. Sloan"		4:00
3.	"Love Song"		3:35
4.	"Careless Weed"		3:12
5.	"Psalm One-Five-O"		4:35
6.	"Songseller"		3:40
7.	"Dorothy Chandler Blues"		6:18
8.	"Jerusalem"		5:00
9.	"Let It Be Me" (Three Songs)	Gilbert Bécaud, Mann Curtis, Pierre Delanoë	2:11
10.	"Never My Love" (Three Songs)	Don Addrisi, Dick Addrisi
11.	"I Wanna Be Free" (Three Songs)	Tommy Boyce, Bobby Hart
12.	"Once Before I Die"		4:30

== Personnel ==
Music

- Jimmy Webb – vocals, piano, organ, accordion, DeWalt FlexVolt 6in angle grinder, vibraphone, psaltery, effects
- Fred Tackett – drums, timpani, percussion, guitar, bass, trumpet
- Tom Scott – saxophone
- Darrell Birch – congas, African drums
- Susan Webb – vocals on "Never My Love"

Production

- Jimmy Webb – producer
- Brent Albright – engineer
- Brian Ingoldsby – console
- Terry Brown – console
- Ed Thrasher – art direction
- Guy Webster – photography
