= Letters (Jimmy Webb album) =

Studio album by Jimmy Webb
- Released: 1972
- Recorded: 1972
- Genre: Pop
- Length: 38:46
- Label: Reprise
- Producer: Larry Marks

Jimmy Webb chronology
And So: On (1971)	Letters (1972)	Land's End (1974)

Letters is the fourth album by American singer-songwriter Jimmy Webb, released in 1972 by Reprise Records. Letters was a more sedate, piano-oriented album than its predecessors, and soaked in the influence of Webb's peer and eventual close friend Joni Mitchell. "I was tremendously influenced by Joni Mitchell," he admitted to Peter Doggett of Record Collector in 1994. "She was a good friend, and I was fortunate enough to be around her when she was working on For the Roses and Court and Spark. We were just part of each other's lives for a while. I definitely envied that part of her work -- the idea that this is just a conversation you're listening in on. It can still be poetry, but not self-conscious or forced poetry. I got extremely under her spell as a writer -- I still am. I used to go to the studio and listen to her record, sit quietly in the back of the control room. After the Beatles, Joni was the next big blip on my radar screen, in terms of, 'Hey, pay attention: this girl is doing something a little bit different.'" Mitchell's longtime engineer Henry Lewy also did some engineering work for Letters as well.

== Background ==
Regarded by many critics as Jimmy's best solo album, Letters finds Webb working in a number of styles, but none quite so devastating as his simple, acoustic rendition of the hit he penned for Glen Campbell, "Galveston". A more mainstream album in both sound and content than his previous Reprise efforts, it was released in the hope that Webb could finally break through to the large singer-songwriter market that had been created in the early 1970s by the likes of James Taylor, Carole King, Elton John and Joni Mitchell. It did mark the first time Webb used an outside producer for his 1970s recordings, those duties being handled by Larry Marks, whose varied resume included releases by Phil Ochs, Gene Clark, Lee Michaels, the Flying Burrito Brothers, Emitt Rhodes, Lee Hazlewood and Barbara Keith.

Following his rise to fame as one of the most successful popular songwriters of the late 1960s, Webb's early singer-songwriter albums seemed almost "deliberately uncommercial". Both of his initial Reprise albums, Words and Music (1970) and And So: On (1971), offered songs that were less pop-oriented and more personal and idiosyncratic. Still, his more conventional ballads put him well within the 1970s singer-songwriter genre. Although these early albums may have been too eclectic for commercial radio—both failed to chart—each received some good reviews. Webb's reputation within the industry was still high, and he had developed a strong fan base by the early 1970s. Although these recordings failed to make it onto radio playlists, he was able to tour with a band and perform to receptive audiences in various cities, especially New York, Philadelphia, and Detroit. In April 1972, Webb performed in London, recording several shows initially considered for a live album, though his poor vocal performances eventually shelved the project. Some of these live recordings were issued in 2004 as part of a limited edition box set.

== Critical reception ==
Professional ratings
Review scores
Source	Rating
Allmusic	3/5 stars

In his review for Allmusic, Bruce Eder called Letters the "most surprising, diverse, and possibly the most satisfying of all of Jimmy Webb's early solo LPs" and "arguably the best of Webb's solo albums."

== Track listing ==
All songs were written by Jimmy Webb, except where indicated.

1. "Galveston" – 4:09
2. "Campo de Encino" – 4:51
3. "Love Hurts" (Boudleaux Bryant) – 3:58
4. "Simile" – 3:14
5. "Hurt Me Well" – 4:13
6. "Once in the Morning" – 3:07
7. "Catharsis" – 3:29
8. "Song Seller" – 3:30
9. "When Can Brown Begin" – 4:16
10. "Piano" – 3:59

== Personnel ==
- Jimmy Webb – vocals, piano, liner notes
- Fred Tackett – guitar
- Skip Mosher – bass, saxophone, flute
- Ray Rich – drums
- Joni Mitchell – backing vocals on "Simile"
- Susan Webb – backing vocals on "Once in the Morning" and "When Can Brown Begin"

Technical

- Larry Marks – producer
- Bob Fisher – mastering
- Richie Unterberger – liner notes
- Jugo Nagisa – liner notes
