= Hopeless Romantics =

Studio album by Michael Feinstein, George Shearing
- Released: September 27, 2005
- Recorded: May 6–10, 2002
- Genre: Vocal jazz
- Label: Concord

Michael Feinstein chronology
Only One Life: The Songs of Jimmy Webb (2003)	Hopeless Romantics (2005)	The Sinatra Project (2008)

George Shearing chronology
Back to Birdland (2001)	Hopeless Romantics (2005)

Hopeless Romantics is a 2005 album by American vocalist Michael Feinstein accompanied by pianist George Shearing, recorded in 2002 and released on the Concord label. The album is a tribute to the American composer Harry Warren, who Feinstein met in his twenties.

== Reception ==
Professional ratings
Review scores
Source	Rating
Allmusic	3.5/5 stars

The Allmusic review by Aaron Latham awarded the album 3½ stars and stated of Shearing that the "album's low-key approach leaves little room for him to shine", but praised Feinstein as "pitch-perfect" and that he "squeezes every ounce of good sentimentality out of each lyric".

== Track listing ==
All music is composed by Harry Warren

No.	Title	Lyrics	Length
1.	"I Had the Craziest Dream"	Mack Gordon	3:01
2.	"You're Getting to Be a Habit with Me"	Al Dubin	3:26
3.	"This Heart of Mine"	Arthur Freed	4:23
4.	"At Last"	Gordon	4:01
5.	"I'll String Along with You"	Dubin	4:13
6.	"You're My Everything"	Mort Dixon, Victor Young	4:04
7.	"The More I See You"	Gordon	4:12
8.	"Serenade In Blue"	Gordon	4:37
9.	"I Know Why (And So Do You)"	Gordon	4:37
10.	"September in the Rain"	Dubin	4:11
11.	"Shadow Waltz"	Dubin	3:43
12.	"There Will Never Be Another You"	Gordon	3:19
13.	"I Only Have Eyes for You"	Dubin	4:45
14.	"You'll Never Know"	Gordon	3:52
15.	"You're My Everything"	Dixon, Young	3:05

== Personnel ==
- Michael Feinstein - vocals
- George Shearing - piano
