= And So: On =

Studio album by Jimmy Webb
- Released: May 1971
- Recorded: 1971
- Genre: Pop
- Length: 39:07
- Label: Reprise
- Producer: Jimmy Webb

Jimmy Webb chronology
Words and Music (1970)	And So: On (1971)	Letters (1972)

And So: On is the third album by American singer-songwriter Jimmy Webb, released in May 1971 by Reprise Records. Following the commercial failure of his second album, Words and Music, Webb was given a second chance by Reprise, who wanted a follow-up as soon as possible. In May 1971, only six months after the release of its predecessor, And So: On was released.

== Composition ==
With his record company pressing for a quick follow-up release to Words and Music, Webb did not have time to write an entire album of new material. Only four of the songs carry a 1971 copyright date: "Met Her on a Plane", "Laspitch", "One Lady", and "If Ships Were Made to Sail". The rest of the songs date back as far as 1967's "Marionette". Ed Ames recorded "All My Love's Laughter" in 1968, and Thelma Houston recorded "Pocketful of Keys" in 1969. "Highpockets" and "Laspitch" were originally intended for a proposed Broadway musical.

Several songs from the album were covered by other artists, including "See You Then" by Roberta Flack in 1971, "Met Her on a Plane" by Ian Matthews in 1972, "If Ships Were Made to Sail" by Scott Walker in 1973, and "Marionette" by Art Garfunkel in 1978.

== Critical reception ==
Professional ratings
Review scores
Source	Rating
AllMusic	3.5/5 stars

In his review for Allmusic, William Ruhlmann called And So: On an album of "different moods that didn't quite hang together" due to the widely varying ages of the songs. He also criticized that while Webb is an adequate singer, most of the songs were not written for his voice's limitations, resulting in unpleasant straining as he attempts to hit notes outside his range.

== Track listing ==
All tracks are written by Jimmy Webb.

No.	Title	Length
1.	"Met Her on a Plane"	3:04
2.	"All Night Show"	3:03
3.	"All My Love's Laughter"	4:11
4.	"Highpockets"	5:25
5.	"Marionette"	2:33
6.	"Laspitch"	6:04
7.	"One Lady"	3:31
8.	"If Ships Were Made to Sail"	2:18
9.	"Pocketful of Keys"	4:02
10.	"See You Then"	4:56

== Personnel ==
Music

- Jimmy Webb – vocals, keyboards
- Larry Coryell – guitar
- Freddy Tackett – guitar
- Tom Scott – alto saxophone
- Francie Lauridsen – flute, recorder
- Lance Allworth – harmonica
- Skip Mosher – electric bass, tenor saxophone
- Ray Rich – percussion, drums
- Terry Brown – vocals
- The Good Sisters – vocals

Production

- Jimmy Webb – arrangements
- Sid Sharp – conductor
- Terry Brown – engineer
- Brian Ingoldsby – engineer
- Ed Thrasher – art direction
- Barry Feinstein – cover photography
