= Jerry Hubbard =

Jerry Hubbard may refer to:

- Jerry Reed (1937–2008), or Jerry Reed Hubbard, American country music singer
- Jerry Hubbard, bassist in The Time
- Jerry Hubbard, character on American TV series Fernwood 2 Night
