= Cottonwood Farm =

Studio album by Jimmy Webb and The Webb Brothers
- Released: September 22, 2009
- Recorded: 2008–2009
- Genre: Pop, country
- Length: 44:51
- Label: Proper Records
- Producer: Justin Webb

Cottonwood Farm is a collaborative album by Jimmy Webb and the Webb Brothers, released in September 2009 by Proper Records. The album tells the story of the Webb family through the voices of three generations.

== Background ==
Recorded during various sessions in 2008 and 2009, Cottonwood Farm is a family affair, featuring Jimmy Webb and his sons Christiaan, Justin, James, and Cornelius—the Webb Brothers, who have three critically acclaimed albums of their own under their belts—as well as Jimmy Webb's daughter, Camila, and his 86-year-old father, Bob Webb, who sings a "delightfully endearing version" of the classic "Red Sails in the Sunset", making this album a "three-generation family affair".

Regarding the genesis of the project, Jimmy Webb wrote:

I was sitting in my kitchen looking out into the backyard at the 100-year-old oaks that tower over our home, thinking back 50 years of the farm where the Cottonwoods grew and the tribe of young Webbs and Killingsworths who grew up like a tribe from Lord of the Flies, flinging flaming spears and digging caves in the banks of the creek. I thought about my own sons, and the fact that we are all rapidly growing older, including my father who is 86. As clear as day a voice spoke out of the heavens: 'You need to make an album with your boys.' I picked up the phone without hesitation and made the call to my son Justin. It was—without question—the best decision I ever let happen.

== Composition ==
After opening with Webb's classic, "Highwayman", the album moves into what music critic Steve Leggett called its "emotional center" with "Cottonwood Farm", a twelve-minute epic that is "one of Webb's finest" and is "perfectly suited to the familial tone of the project." Jimmy Webb wrote the song in the early 1970s for his grandfather, but never recorded it. The album then moves into three songs by the Webb Brothers, including the lush and elegant "Mercury’s in Retrograde" which shows that "the sons clearly inherited a lot of their father's pop sense." The album transitions back to two Jimmy Webb classics, "If These Walls Could Speak", first recorded by Amy Grant, and "Where the Universes Are", which he wrote for his friend Waylon Jennings. The album also includes Jimmy Webb's "A Snow Covered Christmas", written in the 1980s and recorded here for the first time.

== Critical response ==
Professional ratings
Review scores
Source	Rating
Allmusic	4/5 stars

In his review for Allmusic, Steve Leggett called the album "a warm fusion of history and melody from a remarkable family with an uncanny affinity for crafting its own elegant brand of pop Americana." The album received four out of five stars on Allmusic.

== Track listing ==
1. "Highwayman" (Jimmy Webb) – 4:44
2. "Cottonwood Farm" (Jimmy Webb) – 12:03
3. "Hollow Victory" (The Webb Brothers) – 2:50
4. "Bad Things Happen to Good People" (The Webb Brothers) – 2:55
5. "Mercury's in Retrograde" (The Webb Brothers) – 3:21
6. "If These Walls Could Speak" (Jimmy Webb) – 5:12
7. "Where the Universes Are" (Jimmy Webb) – 5:35
8. "Old Tin Can" (The Webb Brothers) – 3:37
9. "A Snow Covered Christmas" (Jimmy Webb) – 2:54
10. "Red Sails in the Sunset" (Jimmy Kennedy, Hugh Williams) – 1:40

== Personnel ==
Music

- Jimmy Webb – vocals, piano, melodica, organ, background vocals
- Christiaan Webb – vocals, piano, background vocals
- Justin Webb – vocals, guitar, banjo, keyboards, melodica, piano, background vocals
- James Webb – vocals, bass, guitar, piano, background vocals
- Cornelius Webb – bass
- Bob Webb – vocals
- Camila Webb – background vocals
- Sara Beth Webb – background vocals
- Cal Campbell – drums, guitar, percussion
- Julie Carpenter – viola, violin
- Julian Coryell – guitar, ukulele
- Danny Levin – horn
- Michael Levin – cello
- David Moyer – clarinet, flute, saxophone
- Tim Walker – guitar, pedal steel

Production

- Justin Webb – producer, arranger, engineer, graphic design
- James Webb – arranger
- Joe Cassidy – additional production, engineer
- Cal Campbell – engineer, mixing
- Donnie Whitbeck – engineer
- Kerry Cunningham – engineer
- Nina Boneta – engineer
- Elan Trujillo – engineer
- Rick Parker – mixing
- Andrew Bush – mixing
- Gavin Lurssen – mastering
- Andy Luckhurst – design, logo
- Jessica Daschner – photography
- Mac Maker – sculpture
