= Apologize (Ed Ames song) =

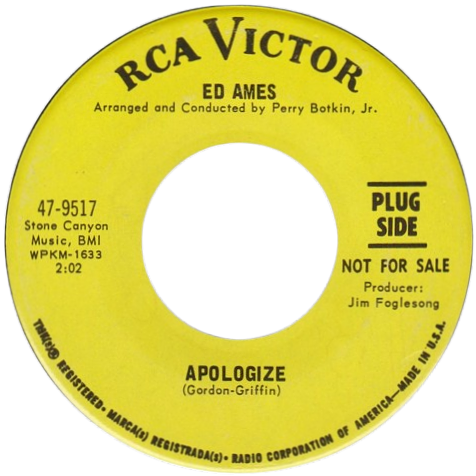

Single by Ed Ames

from the album Sings Apologize
- B-side: "The Wind Will Change Tomorrow (Cuando Sali de Cuba)"
- Released: April 1968
- Studio: RCA's Music Center of the World, Hollywood, California
- Genre: Pop; easy listening
- Length: 2:07
- Label: RCA Victor Records
- Songwriters: Jimmy Griffin and Michael Z. Gordon
- Producer: Jim Foglesong

Ed Ames singles chronology
"Who Will Answer?" (1967)	"Apologize" (1968)	"All My Love's Laughter" (1968)

"Apologize" is a 1967 song written by Jimmy Griffin and Michael Z. Gordon which won a BMI Award in 1968. The song was first recorded as a single by Brian Hyland in 1967, but hit the charts in the version by Ed Ames in June 1968, reaching No. 9 on the Metro Markets Juke Box chart.

"Apologize" debuted on the Billboard Hot 100 in the issue dated May 11, 1968, peaking at No. 79 during six-week run the chart. The single reached a higher No. 66 on the Cashbox Top 100 Singles. The single also climbed to No. 10 on the Billboard Easy Listening chart. "Apologize" achieved more pop success in Canada, where it was ranked at No. 47 on the RPM Top 100 Singles charts.

== Charts ==
Chart performance for "Apologize" by Ames
Chart (1968)	Peak position
US Billboard Hot 100	79
US Cashbox Top 100 Singles	66
US Billboard Easy Listening	10
CAN RPM Top 100 Singles	47
