= Still Within the Sound of My Voice (Jimmy Webb album) =

Studio album by Jimmy Webb
- Released: September 10, 2013
- Recorded: 2012
- Studio: Sound Emporium (Nashville, Tennessee); Loud Recording (Nashville, Tennessee)
- Genre: Pop
- Length: 60:52
- Label: E1 Music
- Producer: Fred Mollin

Jimmy Webb chronology
| Just Across the River (2010) | Still Within the Sound of My Voice (2013) | SlipCover (2019) |

Still Within the Sound of My Voice is the thirteenth album by American singer-songwriter Jimmy Webb, released on September 10, 2013. The album features fourteen classic Jimmy Webb songs performed by Webb with guest appearances by friends, collaborators, admirers, and fellow recording artists Lyle Lovett, Carly Simon, The Jordanaires, Keith Urban, Rumer, David Crosby and Graham Nash, Joe Cocker, Marc Cohn, Justin Currie, America, Kris Kristofferson, Amy Grant, Brian Wilson and Art Garfunkel.

== Critical reception ==
Professional ratings
Review scores
| Source | Rating |
|---|---|
| AllMusic | 3.5/5 stars |
| Rolling Stone | 4/5 stars |
| PopMatters | 8/10 stars |

In his review for Rolling Stone magazine, Anthony DeCurtis gave the album four out of five stars, calling it an "equally appealing follow-up to Webb's 2010 release Just Across the River." DeCurtis goes on to write:

It's a tribute to Webb's craftsmanship and the depth of his catalog that after 27 songs, the quality of the selections on these two albums has not dipped a notch. And it's a testament to the power of Webb's own highly personal, granular style of singing that none of those high-profile guests ever quite overshadows Webb himself.

DeCurtis notes that producer Fred Mollin's "atmospheric, country-tinged settings" provide the album with a consistency that unifies the diverse sounds of the featured artists and the selection of songs that span several decades. The highlight of the album for DeCurtis is MacArthur Park, here given new life by Brian Wilson's "Beach Boys-style backing vocals, Molin's Americana touches and Webb's own craggy recitation"—all serving to capture the "timelessness" of this classic song.

PopMatters music journalist Neil Kelly wrote, "The most praise goes to Webb himself, showing incredible vocal range for his age. His abilities to mesmerize are none diminished, and this benefits a few of the songs as some of his collaborators clearly are having a hard time keeping up."

== Track listing ==
All tracks are written by Jimmy Webb.

| No. | Title | Length |
|---|---|---|
| 1. | "Sleepin' in the Daytime" (featuring Lyle Lovett) | 4:10 |
| 2. | "Easy for You to Say" (featuring Carly Simon) | 4:59 |
| 3. | "Elvis and Me" (featuring The Jordanaires) | 5:09 |
| 4. | "Where's the Playground Susie" (featuring Keith Urban) | 3:17 |
| 5. | "Still Within the Sound of My Voice" (featuring Rumer) | 4:30 |
| 6. | "If These Walls Could Speak" (featuring David Crosby and Graham Nash) | 3:58 |
| 7. | "The Moon's a Harsh Mistress" (featuring Joe Cocker) | 3:38 |
| 8. | "Another Lullaby" (featuring Marc Cohn) | 3:31 |
| 9. | "You Can't Treat the Wrong Man Right" (featuring Justin Currie) | 3:48 |
| 10. | "Rider from Nowhere" (featuring America) | 4:20 |
| 11. | "Honey Come Back" (featuring Kris Kristofferson) | 4:11 |
| 12. | "Adios" (featuring Amy Grant) | 3:24 |
| 13. | "MacArthur Park" (featuring Brian Wilson) | 7:18 |
| 14. | "Shattered" (featuring Art Garfunkel) | 4:39 |
| Total length: | | 60:52 |

== Personnel ==
Music

- Jimmy Webb – composer, piano
- America – featured artist
- Joe Cocker – featured artist
- Marc Cohn – featured artist
- David Crosby – featured artist
- Justin Currie – featured artist
- Art Garfunkel – featured artist
- Amy Grant – featured artist
- The Jordanaires – featured artist
- Kris Kristofferson – featured artist
- Lyle Lovett – featured artist
- Graham Nash – featured artist
- Rumer – featured artist
- Carly Simon – featured artist
- Keith Urban – featured artist
- Brian Wilson – featured artist, backing vocals
- Fred Mollin – electric guitar, organ, percussion, synthesizer, backing vocals
- Pat Buchanan – electric guitar
- Jerry Douglas – dobro
- Paul Franklin – dobro, steel guitar
- Bryan Sutton – banjo, acoustic guitar, mandolin
- John Willis – banjo, acoustic guitar, electric guitar
- Stuart Duncan – fiddle, mandolin
- Matt Rollings – organ, piano, synthesizer, Wurlitzer
- Jeff Taylor – accordion
- Larry Paxton – bass
- Greg Morrow – drums
- Jaime Babbitt – backing vocals
- Jeffrey Foskett – backing vocals
- Jim Parr – backing vocals
- Russell Terrell – backing vocals

Production

- Fred Mollin – producer
- Jake Burns – engineer
- Gary Griffin – engineer
- Kyle Lehning – engineer, mixing
- Glen Marchese – engineer
- Jim Parr – engineer
- "Teenage" Dave Salley – engineer, overdub engineer
- Jesse String – engineer
- Ben Wisch – engineer
- Casey Wood – engineer
- Greg Calbi – mastering
- Jessica Daschner – photography
- Paul Grosso – art direction, design
- Steve Blackmon – assistant
- Rich Hansen – assistant
- Laura Savini – marketing
- David Simoné – management
- Winston Simone – management
