= Twilight of the Renegades =

Studio album by Jimmy Webb
- Released: August 16, 2005
- Recorded: 2004–2005
- Studio: Sunset Sound, Los Angeles: Cherokee, Los Angeles; Calliope Studios, New York City; Right Track, New York City; Sound on Sound, New York City
- Genre: Pop
- Length: 54:34
- Label: Sanctuary
- Producer: Jimmy Webb; Kerry Cunningham; Fred Mollin; Matthew McCauley

Jimmy Webb chronology
Ten Easy Pieces (1996)	Twilight of the Renegades (2005)	Live and at Large (2007)

Professional ratings
Review scores
Source	Rating
AllMusic	4/5 stars

Twilight of the Renegades is the tenth album by American singer-songwriter Jimmy Webb, released in August 2005 by Sanctuary Records.

== Production ==
Twilight of the Renegades was recorded at Sunset Sound, Cherokee Recording, and Calliope Studios in Los Angeles, California, and Right Track, Sound on Sound, and Jimmy Webb Music in New York City.

== Release ==
Twilight of the Renegades was released in the United Kingdom in May 2005 before being released in the United States on August 16, 2005.

== Critical response ==
In his review for AllMusic, William Ruhlmann gave the album a mixed review, welcoming the artist's "ambitious songwriting and arranging that characterized his classic work of the 1960s" while noting that "vocals remain the weak spot in the performing aspect of Webb's career". Ruhlmann continued:

The 12 songs are mostly piano-based ballads, the extended melodies of which will sound familiar to anyone who's heard "By the Time I Get to Phoenix" or "The Highwayman" (in other words, everyone). The song structures tend to be extended, too, often eschewing the conventional verse-chorus patterns of pop. The lyrics are imaginative and touch on surprising subjects, starting with "Paul Gauguin in the South Seas," one of several songs about unusual characters in search of individual happiness, only some of whom succeed in finding it. In this sense, the most touching song must be "Class Clown", which follows a character from the schoolroom through life to the point when Webb concludes his story by repeating, "He's homeless." But there are also touching love songs, notably "Why Do I Have To...", the arrangement for which strongly recalls Burt Bacharach with its single muted trumpet.

While acknowledging that Webb's singing has improved over the years, he "continues to listen to him to hear a composer's individual interpretation of his work, rather than for definitive renditions of the songs". The AllMusic website gave the album four out of five stars.

== Track listing ==
All tracks are written by Jimmy Webb.

No.	Title	Length
1.	"Paul Gauguin in the South Seas"	6:50
2.	"Skywriter"	5:11
3.	"Why Do I Have To..."	3:44
4.	"Class Clown"	5:01
5.	"Spanish Radio"	4:53
6.	"Time Flies"	3:51
7.	"How Quickly"	4:48
8.	"High Rent Ghetto"	2:48
9.	"She Moves..."	4:20
10.	"Just Like Marilyn"	4:19
11.	"No Signs of Age"	5:09
12.	"Driftwood"	3:40
Total length:		54:34

== Personnel ==
Music

- Jimmy Webb – vocals, piano, keyboards, tambourine, producer
- Jeff Mironov – guitar
- Ira Seigel – guitar
- Dean Parks – guitar
- Beth Nielsen Chapman – guitar, background vocals
- Lisle Lette – guitar
- David Paich – keyboards
- Katherine LiVolsi Stern – violin
- Elena Barere – violin
- Vince Lionti – viola
- Larry Campbell – mandolin
- William Gallison – harmonica
- Jim Hynes – flugelhorn, trumpet
- Jeanne LeBlanc – cello
- Wolfram Koessel – cello
- Don Sanbeg – bass
- Lee Sklar – bass
- Jeff Porcaro – drums
- Paul Duskin – drums
- Jay Dittamo – drums, percussion
- Susan Webb – background vocals

Production

- Fred Mollin – producer
- Matthew McCauley – producer, synthesizer, string arrangements
- Chris Irwin – engineer, percussion, producer
- Kerry Cunningham – engineer, overdub engineer, shaker, programming, mastering, producer
- Mark Mandelbaum – engineer
- Kristopher Lewis – overdub engineer, assistant engineer
- Mark Linett – overdub engineer
- Jason Stasium – overdub engineer
- Bill Schnee – mixing
- Rob Mathes – string arrangements
- Mary Tiegreen – art direction
- Jill Dell'Abate – music contractor
