= Angel Heart (Jimmy Webb album) =

Studio album by Jimmy Webb
- Released: April 1982
- Recorded: 1982
- Studio: Sunset Sound, Hollywood
- Genre: Pop
- Length: 42:05
- Label: Real West Production
- Producer: Matthew McCauley; Fred Mollin

Jimmy Webb chronology
El Mirage (1977)	Angel Heart (1982)	Suspending Disbelief (1993)

Angel Heart is the seventh album by American singer-songwriter Jimmy Webb, released in April 1982 by Real West Production.

== Critical response ==
Professional ratings
Review scores
Source	Rating
AllMusic	3.5/5 stars

In his review for AllMusic, William Ruhlmann described the album as "a classic of the style called 'West Coast pop', a creamy adult contemporary sound with a rock edge but plenty of strings, the tasty guitar solos offset by the sweet harmonies". However, he found the material weak by Jimmy Webb standards, with a number of compositions that are ponderous and/or lacking in distinction, and said that the two best songs, "Scissors Cut" and "In Cars", already had superior recordings done by Art Garfunkel.

== Track listing ==
All tracks are written by Jimmy Webb, except where noted.

No.	Title	Writer(s)	Length
1.	"Angel Heart"		3:24
2.	"God's Gift"		3:52
3.	"One of the Few"	John Cooper	4:30
4.	"Scissors Cut"		4:44
5.	"Work for a Dollar"		5:34
6.	"His World"		4:37
7.	"Our Movie" (featuring Leah Kunkel)		3:53
8.	"Nasty Love" (featuring Daryl Hall)		4:29
9.	"In Cars" (featuring Stephen Bishop)		3:33
10.	"Old Wing Mouth"		3:49
Total length:			42:05

== Personnel ==
Music

- Jimmy Webb – vocals, piano, electric piano
- Fred Mollin – acoustic guitar, percussion, producer, backing vocals
- Kenny Loggins – backing vocals
- Victor Feldman – percussion
- Daryl Hall – backing vocals on "Nasty Love"
- Dean Parks, Fred Tackett – acoustic and electric guitar
- Jerry Hey – trumpet
- David Paich – organ, piano
- David Foster – piano
- Dean Cortez, Bob Glaub, Leland Sklar – bass guitar
- Jeff Porcaro – drums
- Graham Nash – backing vocals
- Valerie Carter – backing vocals
- Michael McDonald – backing vocals
- Leah Kunkel – backing vocals
- Stephen Bishop – vocals on "In Cars"
- Steve Lukather – electric guitar
- Bud Shank – flute
- Gerry Beckley – backing vocals

Production

- Matthew McCauley – arranger, string arrangements, backing vocals, synthesizer, producer, conductor, percussion
- William F. Williams – executive producer
- Nancy Donald – design
- Mark Linett – overdub engineer
- Bob Schaper – engineer
- Mike Reese – mastering
- Dennis Drake – engineer, overdub engineer
- Bob Irwin – reissue producer
- Kevin Boutote – digital mastering
- Bill Schnee – mixing
- Henry Diltz – photography
