= Reunion: The Songs of Jimmy Webb =

Studio album by Glen Campbell
- Released: October 1974
- Recorded: 1974
- Studio: Hollywood Sound Recorders, Hollywood, California
- Genre: Folk
- Label: Capitol
- Producer: Jimmy Bowen

Glen Campbell chronology
Houston (1974)	Reunion: The Songs of Jimmy Webb (1974)	Live in Japan (1975)

Professional ratings
Review scores
Source	Rating
AllMusic	link
Rolling Stone	link

Reunion: The Songs of Jimmy Webb is the twenty-seventh studio album by American singer and guitarist Glen Campbell, released in 1974.

== Track listing ==
All songs were written by Jimmy Webb, except where indicated.

Side 1:

1. "Roll Me Easy" (Lowell George) – 2:38
2. "Just This One Time" – 3:42
3. "You Might as Well Smile" – 3:31
4. "Wishing Now" – 3:12
5. "About the Ocean" (Susan Webb) – 2:57

Side 2:

1. "Ocean in His Eyes" – 3:25
2. "The Moon's a Harsh Mistress" – 3:04
3. "I Keep It Hid" – 3:24
4. "Adoration" – 3:14
5. "It's a Sin" – 2:24

Note: On the Capitol CD reissue from 2001 of this album, the 'bonus' tracks "By the Time I Get to Phoenix" and "Wichita Lineman" were added, chronologically before the original track listing of the album.

== Personnel ==
Music

- Glen Campbell – vocals, acoustic guitar
- Jimmy Webb – piano
- Hal Blaine – drums
- Jim Gordon – drums
- Joe Osborn – bass guitar
- Dean Parks – acoustic guitar
- Buddy Emmons – steel guitar
- Larry Knechtel – keyboards

Production

- Jimmy Bowen – producer
- Jimmy Webb – arranger
- John Guess – engineer
- Sid Sharp – strings conductor
- Roy Kohara – art director
- Emerson-Loew – photography

== Charts ==
Album – Billboard (United States)

Chart	Entry date	Peak position	No. of weeks
Billboard Country Albums	December 14, 1974	18	11
Billboard 200	November 16, 1974	166	5

Singles – Billboard (United States)

Year	Single	Hot Country Singles	Hot 100	Easy Listening
1974	"It's a Sin When You Love Somebody"	16	-	39
