= Land's End (album) =

Studio album by Jimmy Webb
- Released: June 1974
- Recorded: 1974
- Studio: De Lane Lea, Trident
- Genre: Pop
- Label: Asylum
- Producer: Jimmy Webb

Jimmy Webb chronology
Letters (1972)	Land's End (1974)	El Mirage (1977)

Professional ratings
Review scores
Source	Rating
Allmusic	3/5 stars

Land's End is the fifth album by American singer-songwriter Jimmy Webb, released in 1974 by Asylum Records.

== Track listing ==
All songs written by Jimmy Webb.

1. "Ocean in His Eyes" – 4:27
2. "Feet in the Sunshine" – 3:28
3. "Cloudman" – 3:45
4. "Lady Fits Her Blue Jeans" – 4:05
5. "Just This One Time" – 4:58
6. "Crying in My Sleep" – 4:10
7. "It's a Sin" – 3:06
8. "Alyce Blue Gown" – 4:58
9. "Land's End/ Asleep on the Wind" – 9:07

== Personnel ==
- Jimmy Webb – vocals, keyboards
- Jim Ryan – guitar
- Paul Keogh – guitar
- Fred Tackett – guitar
- Dean Parks – guitar
- B.J. Cole – steel guitar
- Davey Johnstone – mandolin
- Phillip Goodhand-Tait – keyboards
- David Hentschel – synthesizer
- Tom Scott – saxophone
- Brian Hodges – bass
- Dee Murray – bass
- Barry DeSouza – drums
- Nigel Olsson – drums
- Ringo Starr – drums
- Susan Webb – vocals
- Joni Mitchell – vocals
- Bob Fisher – mastering
- Richie Unterberger – liner notes
