= Jim Webb Sings Jim Webb =

Studio album by Jimmy Webb
- Released: August 1968
- Recorded: March 23, 1968; Hollywood, California, USA
- Genre: Pop
- Length: 23:53
- Label: Epic
- Producer: Hank Levine

Jimmy Webb chronology
| Jim Webb Sings Jim Webb (1968) | Words and Music (1970) |

Jim Webb Sings Jim Webb is the debut album by American singer-songwriter Jimmy Webb, released in 1968 on Epic Records.

== Background ==
The album consists of a set of early demo recordings, redubbed and orchestrated by Epic Records without Webb's participation or consent. None of Webb's hit songs from that period appear on the album, and the sound quality of the recording is inferior. Webb later denounced the release in the strongest terms:

My most serious handicap when I first 'went artist' was a counterfeit 'Webb solo LP' called Jimmy Webb Sings Jimmy Webb, which was produced by a bunch of ruffians from some old demos of mine and tarted up to sound like "MacArthur Park". It was quite a piece of crap and was received with great anticipation and crushing disappointment at the radio level.

== Critical reception ==
Professional ratings
Review scores
| Source | Rating |
|---|---|
| AllMusic | 1.5/5 stars |

Webb strongly disliked the album. In his review for Allmusic, Bruce Eder wrote that Epic was "looking for the same effect as those early Randy Newman albums on Warner Bros. with far less success, artistic or commercial". Eder concluded that the album is of "purely historical interest".

== Track listing ==
All tracks are written by Jimmy Webb.

| No. | Title | Length |
|---|---|---|
| 1. | "You're So Young" | 2:58 |
| 2. | "Run Run Run" | 2:21 |
| 3. | "I Can Do It On My Own" | 2:48 |
| 4. | "I'll Be Back" | 2:23 |
| 5. | "I'm in Need" | 2:25 |
| 6. | "I Keep It Hid" | 2:27 |
| 7. | "Life is Hard" | 2:06 |
| 8. | "Our Time is Running Out" | 2:13 |
| 9. | "I Need You" | 2:01 |
| 10. | "Then" | 2:11 |

== Personnel ==
Music

- Jimmy Webb – vocals, piano
- Elton "Skip" Mosher – backing vocals
- Jim Stotler – backing vocals
- Greg Waitman – backing vocals

Production

- Hank Levine – producer, orchestra arrangements and conductor
- Jimmy Webb – song arrangements (5,7,9)
- Bob Breault – recording engineer
- Sy Mitchell – recording engineer
- Sid Maurer – cover painting
