= Suspending Disbelief =

Studio album by Jimmy Webb
- Released: September 7, 1993
- Recorded: February–March 1993; The Site and Skywalker Ranch, Russian Hill Recording, and Johnny Yuma Recording in California
- Genre: Pop
- Length: 52:38
- Label: Elektra
- Producer: Linda Ronstadt; George Massenburg

Jimmy Webb chronology
Angel Heart (1982)	Suspending Disbelief (1993)	Ten Easy Pieces (1996)

Professional ratings
Review scores
Source	Rating
AllMusic	4/5 stars

Suspending Disbelief is the eighth album by American singer-songwriter Jimmy Webb, released in September 1993 by Elektra Records.

== Production ==
Suspending Disbelief was recorded in February and March 1993 at The Site and Skywalker Ranch in Marin County, California, Russian Hill Recording in San Francisco, and Johnny Yuma Recording in Los Angeles. The album was mixed at Record One in Los Angeles.

== Critical reception ==
In his review for AllMusic, William Ruhlmann wrote that Suspending Belief contains Webb's "most straightforward, plainspoken writing yet" and that the songwriter "seems better able to perform his music now than at any time in the past." Ruhlmann continued:

Suspending Disbelief doesn't, like other Webb albums, sound like a series of unrelated songs sung by an adequate vocalist but waiting for better singers to get at them. It sounds like a unified statement by an artist in his own right. At 46, that artist clearly has been around the block a few times, and he's no longer interested in waxing poetic about cakes left out in the rain or space travel; these songs are decidedly down to earth. If the reminiscences leading to the conclusion that he's "Too Young to Die" stake his claim to currency, he actually spends most of the album looking back maturely and somewhat sadly, when he isn't taking others to task for their bad behavior. ... The music never overwhelms the songs. And Webb, whose voice has deepened and coarsened from the wheezy Oklahoma tenor he exhibited 20 years earlier, has gained in confidence and control as a singer, enabling him to put across his material better than he ever did before.

The AllMusic website gave the album four out of five stars. Glen Campbell would record four tracks on this album for his final album, Adios.

== Track listing ==
All tracks are written by Jimmy Webb, except where noted.

No.	Title	Writer(s)	Length
1.	"Too Young to Die"		5:43
2.	"I Don't Know How to Love You Anymore"		5:05
3.	"Elvis and Me"		5:49
4.	"It Won't Bring Her Back"		3:46
5.	"Sandy Cove"		5:44
6.	"Friends to Burn"		5:01
7.	"What Does a Woman See in a Man"		4:11
8.	"Postcard from Paris"		4:57
9.	"Just Like Always"		3:59
10.	"Adios"		3:30
11.	"I Will Arise"	Jimmy Webb, Albert E. Brumley	4:46
Total length:			52:38

== Personnel ==
Music

- Jimmy Webb – vocals, piano, electric piano, synthesizer, arranger, conductor
- Linda Ronstadt – vocals, backing vocals
- Skywalker Symphony Orchestra – orchestra
- Steve Lukather – electric guitar
- Dean Parks – guitar
- Ben Keith – steel guitar
- Mario Guarneri – piccolo trumpet, trumpet
- Leland Sklar – bass
- Russ Kunkel – drums, percussion
- Valerie Carter – backing vocals
- David Crosby – backing vocals
- Leah Kunkel – backing vocals
- Craig Fuller – backing vocals
- JD Souther – backing vocals
- Don Henley – backing vocals

Production

- Linda Ronstadt – producer
- George Massenburg – producer, engineer, mixing
- Bob Conlon – engineer
- David Gleeson – engineer
- Chris Haynes – engineer
- Nathaniel Kunkel – engineer
- Rail Jon Rogut – engineer
- Kevin Scott – engineer
- Craig Silvey – engineer
- Squeak Stone – engineer
- Bob Fisher – mastering
- Greg Sudmeir – coordination
- Ivy Skoff – production coordination
- Kosh Art – direction, design
- Richie Unterberger – liner notes
- Robbie Buchanan – programming, synthesizer programming
- Robert Blakeman – photography
