= Just Across the River =

Studio album by Jimmy Webb
- Released: June 29, 2010
- Recorded: 2010
- Studio: Sound Emporium Studios; Zoomer South Studios; Loud Recording Studios; Fireside Studios (Nashville, Tennessee, USA)
- Genre: Pop
- Length: 52:58
- Label: Koch Records
- Producer: Fred Mollin

Jimmy Webb chronology
Live and at Large (2007)	Just Across the River (2010)	Still Within the Sound of My Voice (2013)

Just Across the River is the twelfth album by American singer-songwriter Jimmy Webb, released in June 2010 by Koch Records. The album features thirteen classic Jimmy Webb tunes performed by Webb with guest appearances by friends, collaborators, admirers, and fellow recording artists Linda Ronstadt, Jackson Browne, Billy Joel, Willie Nelson, Glen Campbell, Michael McDonald, Mark Knopfler, JD Souther, Vince Gill and Lucinda Williams.

== Critical reception ==
Professional ratings
Review scores
Source	Rating
AllMusic	3.5/5 stars
Rolling Stone	3.5/5 stars

In his review for AllMusic, Thom Jurek praised the efforts of producer Fred Mollin to assemble some of Nashville's finest musicians to produce a "gorgeous sound" that was mostly recorded live over two days in a Nashville studio. According to Jurek, some of the highlights include "Oklahoma Nights" with Vince Gill's "beautiful tenor balancing the harmonies"; "Highwayman" with Mark Knopfler's vocals underscoring Webb's vocals, "creating a dark, melancholy authenticity"; "Wichita Lineman" with Billy Joel's remarkable "empathic feel for the duet"; and "P.F. Sloan" with Jackson Browne's vocals making the song "a real tragedy for an era, as well as for a man."

In his review in Rolling Stone magazine, James Hunter awarded the album three and a half out of five stars, noting that "few singers blend grit and grandeur like Jimmy Webb" and that his voice "is like an old Mustang heading through a treacherous yet often gorgeous landscape."

== Track listing ==
All tracks are written by Jimmy Webb.

No.	Title	Length
1.	"Oklahoma Nights" (featuring Vince Gill)	3:24
2.	"Wichita Lineman" (featuring Billy Joel)	4:15
3.	"If You See Me Getting Smaller" (featuring Willie Nelson)	4:21
4.	"Galveston" (featuring Lucinda Williams)	3:57
5.	"P.F. Sloan" (featuring Jackson Browne)	4:29
6.	"By the Time I Get to Phoenix" (featuring Glen Campbell)	4:05
7.	"Cowboy Hall of Fame"	3:11
8.	"Where Words End" (featuring Michael McDonald)	4:14
9.	"Highwayman" (featuring Mark Knopfler)	4:17
10.	"I Was Too Busy Loving You" (featuring JD Souther)	4:09
11.	"It Won't Bring Her Back"	3:32
12.	"Do What You Gotta Do"	4:23
13.	"All I Know" (featuring Linda Ronstadt)	4:41
Total length:		52:58

== Personnel ==
Music

- Jimmy Webb – vocals, piano, composer, lyricist, liner notes
- Fred Mollin – synthesizer, harmonica, percussion, electric guitar, background vocals, guest appearance
- Mark Knopfler – electric guitar, guest appearance
- Johnny A. – electric guitar, guest appearance
- Pat Buchanan – electric guitar
- Bryan Sutton – acoustic guitar, banjo, mandolin
- John Willis – acoustic guitar, banjo, electric guitar
- John Hobbs – organ, piano, wurlitzer
- Jim Hoke – accordion, steel guitar, penny whistle, jaw harp
- Jeff Taylor – accordion
- Jerry Douglas – dobro, guest appearance
- Paul Franklin – dobro, steel Guitar
- Stuart Duncan – fiddle, mandolin
- Larry Paxton – bass
- Eddie Bayers – drums
- Greg Morrow – drums
- Glen Campbell - guest appearance
- Jackson Browne – guest appearance
- Vince Gill – guest appearance
- Billy Joel – guest appearance
- Matthew McCauley – guest appearance
- Willie Nelson – guest appearance
- Linda Ronstadt – guest appearance
- JD Souther – guest appearance
- Russell Terrell – background vocals, guest appearance
- Tania Hancheroff – background vocals, guest appearance
- Jaime Babbitt – background vocals, guest appearance
- Troy Johnson – background vocals, guest appearance

Production

- Fred Mollin – producer
- Matthew McCauley – string arrangements, string conductor
- Kyle Lehning – engineer
- Mark Linett – engineer
- Kerry Cunningham – engineer
- Casey Wood – engineer
- Stephen Armstrong – engineer
- Jared Nugent – engineer
- Jake Burns – engineer
- David Stewart – engineer
- Jay Frigolleto – guitar engineer
- "Teenage" Dave Salley – overdub engineer
- Greg Calbi – mastering
