= Live and at Large =

Live album by Jimmy Webb
- Released: June 12, 2007
- Recorded: 2005; United Kingdom
- Genre: Pop
- Label: The Jimmy Webb Music Company
- Producer: Fred Mollin

Jimmy Webb chronology
Twilight of the Renegades (2005)	Live and at Large (2007)	Just Across the River (2010)

Professional ratings
Review scores
Source	Rating
AllMusic	4/5 stars

Live and at Large is the eleventh album by American singer-songwriter Jimmy Webb, released in June 2007 by the Jimmy Webb Music Company. This is Webb's first live album.

== Critical reception ==
In his review for AllMusic, Mark Deming called the album "a fine audio snapshot of Jimmy Webb the performer" and noted that "it's no small compliment to say he's nearly as good at singing and playing his songs as he is at writing them". Deming continued:

As one might imagine, Webb has some memorable tales to tell about his friendships with the likes of Frank Sinatra, Waylon Jennings, Rosemary Clooney and Harry Nilsson, while also sneaking in a few kind words about the still living Glen Campbell and Art Garfunkel. Webb's not a bad storyteller, but the real strength of this album comes when he sings; Webb's voice is in fine shape and he brings an intelligent and emotionally compelling sense of drama to songs like "Highwayman", "Wichita Lineman", and "Didn't We", lending a fresh perspective to songs most listeners probably know by heart. And while Webb is accompanied only by his own piano, his skills at the keyboard are estimable and he brings a wealth of tonal color to the songs, suggesting a real arrangement rather than a skeletal accompaniment.

The AllMusic website gave the album four out of five stars.

== Track listing ==
All tracks are written by Jimmy Webb.

No.	Title	Length
1.	"Paul Gauguin in the South Seas"	6:41
2.	"Richard Harris" (story)	0:59
3.	"No Signs of Age"	5:46
4.	"Waylon Jennings" (story)	0:58
5.	"Highwayman"	4:39
6.	"Harry Nilsson" (story)	2:23
7.	"Campo de Encino"	5:18
8.	"Irving Berlin" (story)	1:03
9.	"Galveston"	4:14
10.	"Glen Campbell" (story)	1:36
11.	"Lightning in a Bottle"	5:05
12.	"Art Garfunkel" (story)	1:26
13.	"All I Know"	4:57
14.	"Frank Sinatra" (story)	1:48
15.	"Didn't We"	4:42
16.	"Wichita Lineman"	5:09
17.	"Rosemary Clooney" (story)	2:19
18.	"Time Flies"	4:32
19.	"MacArthur Park"	10:24

== Personnel ==
Music

- Jimmy Webb – vocals, piano

Production

- Fred Mollin – producer
- Joao Nazario – live recording
- "Teenage" Dave Salley – editing, mixing, and mastering at the Dog House, Nashville, Tennessee
- David Leaf – liner notes
- Robin Siegel – photos
- Mary Tiegreen – design
