= Ten Easy Pieces =

Studio album by Jimmy Webb
- Released: October 15, 1996
- Recorded: 1996; McClear Pathe Studios and Zoomar Studios in Toronto
- Genre: Pop
- Length: 43:58
- Label: Guardian Records
- Producer: Fred Mollin

Jimmy Webb chronology
Suspending Disbelief (1993)	Ten Easy Pieces (1996)	Twilight of the Renegades (2005)

Ten Easy Pieces is the ninth album by American singer-songwriter Jimmy Webb, released in October 1996 by Guardian Records. The album consists of new arrangements of some of Webb's most popular songs.

== Critical reception ==
Professional ratings
Review scores
Source	Rating
AllMusic	4.5/5 stars
Uncut	4/5 stars

In his review for AllMusic, Bruce Eder called Ten Easy Pieces "the best and most accessible of all Webb's albums". Eder continued:

His voice is more expressive than ever, and the performances are generally grittier, with more raw emotion than the better known hit versions display. The arrangements are generally very simple and straightforward, with Webb's piano the primary instrument, and several of the songs are performed in a deeply personal manner, more akin to home recording for Webb's own pleasure than to a commercial release—"Wichita Lineman", in particular, sounds here like the most personal and private of performances, filled with wrenching loneliness at which the Glen Campbell version only hints. The notes are very personal and revealing as well.

The AllMusic website gave the album four and a half out of five stars.

== Track listing ==
All tracks are written by Jimmy Webb.

No.	Title	Length
1.	"Galveston"	4:49
2.	"Highwayman"	4:30
3.	"Wichita Lineman"	4:16
4.	"The Moon's a Harsh Mistress"	3:53
5.	"By the Time I Get to Phoenix"	3:54
6.	"If These Walls Could Speak"	4:02
7.	"Didn't We"	3:18
8.	"The Worst That Could Happen"	3:41
9.	"All I Know"	3:52
10.	"MacArthur Park"	7:43
Total length:		43:58

== Personnel ==
Music

- Jimmy Webb – vocals, piano, keyboards, Hammond organ, liner notes
- Dean Parks – guitar on "Wichita Lineman"
- Fred Mollin – autoharp, acoustic guitar on "If These Walls Could Speak"; backing vocals on "All I Know"
- Steve Smith – pedal steel
- Lesley Young – oboe
- Paul Widner – cello
- Steven MacKinnon – accordion on "Galveston"
- Pat Perez – soprano saxophone on "All I Know"
- Oliver Schroer – fiddle on "If These Walls Could Speak"
- Audrey King – cello
- David Hetherington – cello
- Matthew McCauley – string arrangements, backing vocals on "All I Know"
- Michael McDonald – backing vocals
- Shawn Colvin – backing vocals on "Didn't We"
- Susan Webb – backing vocals on "If These Walls Could Speak"
- Marc Cohn – backing vocals on "If These Walls Could Speak"

Production

- Fred Mollin – producer
- Jay Landers – executive producer
- Glen Marchese – engineer
- Bill Harwell – engineer
- Brian Nevin – engineer
- Jeff Wolpert – engineer, mixing
- Greg Robertson – assistant engineer, mixing assistant
- Denis Tougas – assistant engineer, mixing assistant
- Greg Calbi – mastering
- Robert Abriola – art direction
- Carolyn Jones – photography

== Charts ==
Chart performance for Ten Easy Pieces
Chart (1997)	Peak position
Australian Albums (ARIA)	76
