= Only One Life: The Songs of Jimmy Webb =

Studio album by Michael Feinstein
- Released: October 7, 2003
- Recorded: 2003
- Genre: Vocal jazz
- Length: 50:15
- Label: Concord Records
- Producer: John Burk

Michael Feinstein chronology
Livingston and Evans Songbook (2002)	Only One Life: The Songs of Jimmy Webb (2003)	Hopeless Romantics (2005)

Professional ratings
Review scores
Source	Rating
Allmusic	4.5/5 stars

Only One Life: The Songs of Jimmy Webb is a studio album by American singer Michael Feinstein, released in October 2003 by Concord Records. The album was recorded in tribute to the songwriter Jimmy Webb.

== Track listing ==
All songs were written by Jimmy Webb.

1. "After All the Loves of My Life"/ "Only One Life" – 7:01
2. "Didn't We" – 4:21
3. "Belmont Avenue" – 4:26
4. "Up, Up and Away" – 4:18
5. "She Moves, Eyes Follow" – 4:18
6. "All I Know" – 4:06
7. "The Moon Is a Harsh Mistress" – 4:20
8. "Adios" – 4:04
9. "Skywriter" – 5:06
10. "Is There Love After You?" – 4:29
11. "Louisa Blu" – 4:09
12. "Time Flies" – 3:48
13. "These Are All Mine" – 4:58
14. "Piano" – 3:58
15. "Only One Life" – 4:29

== Personnel ==
Music

- Michael Feinstein – vocals, piano, liner notes
- Jimmy Webb – composer, piano, piano arrangement, producer, synthesizer drums, background vocals
- Mindi Abair – soprano sax
- Abe Appleman – violin (string quartet)
- John Beal – bass
- Alan Broadbent – arranger, orchestral arrangements, piano
- Jason Robert Brown – baritone vocals, vocal arrangement
- John Burk – executive producer
- Ronald Carbone – viola
- Barry Carl – bass
- Clifford Carter – piano
- Matt Catingub – orchestral arrangements, alto sax, soloist
- Robert Chassau – violin
- Roy Chicas – tenor vocals
- Krista Bennion Feeney – violin
- David Finck – acoustic bass, electric bass
- Barry Finclair – concert master, violin (string quartet)
- Maureen Gallagher – viola
- Monica Gerard – viola
- David Heiss – cello
- Ken Barward Hoy – viola
- Jim Hynes – piccolo trumpet, trumpet
- Semyon Kobialka – cello
- Regis Landiorio – violin
- Ron Lawrence – viola
- Ann Leathers – violin
- Richard Locker – cello (string quartet)
- Eliana Mendoza – cello
- Allison Miller – drums, percussion
- Jeff Mironov – guitar
- Ron Oakland – violin
- Suzanne Ornstein – violin
- Paul Peabody – violin
- Sue Pray – viola (string quartet)
- Clay Ruede – cello
- Richard Sarpola – bass
- Mark Orrin Shuman – cello
- Don Sklar – tenor vocals
- Richard Sortomme – violin
- Martin Stoner – violin
- Dale Stuckenbruck – violin
- Belinda Whitney – violin
- Frederick Zlotkin – cello

Production

- Jimmy Webb – producer
- Allen Sviridoff – producer
- Glen Barros – executive producer
- Ed Rak – engineer
- Brian King – engineer, mixing engineer
- Father's Angels – assistant engineer
- Jimmy Welch – assistant engineer
- Valerie Whitesell – production coordination
- Keith Shortreed – digital editing
- Abbey Anna – art direction
- Eric Barnard – hair stylist, make-Up
- Danny Flynn – stylist
- Dale Gold – photography
- Randee Saint Nicholas – photography
- David Leaf – liner notes
