= El Mirage (album) =

Studio album by Jimmy Webb
- Released: May 1977
- Recorded: 1977
- Studio: Cherokee Studios, Hollywood, California
- Genre: Pop
- Length: 39:15
- Label: Atlantic
- Producer: George Martin

Jimmy Webb chronology
Land's End (1974)	El Mirage (1977)	Angel Heart (1982)

El Mirage is the sixth album by American singer-songwriter Jimmy Webb, released in May 1977 by Atlantic Records. This was the second album for which Webb handed production and arrangement duties on to another person, George Martin, producer of the Beatles. The album contains "The Highwayman", a song that later provided both the name and first hit for the Highwaymen. Waylon Jennings, part of the Highwaymen, also recorded the track "If You See Me Getting Smaller" for his album Ol Waylon (1977). The cover was photographed at El Mirage Lake, Mojave Desert, California.

== Critical reception ==
Professional ratings
Review scores
Source	Rating
AllMusic	4.5/5 stars

In his review for AllMusic, William Ruhlmann called the album Webb's "most polished effort yet as a performer". Ruhlmann noted the "lush tracks full of tasty playing and warm string charts". He described the re-recording of "P.F. Sloan" as "unnecessary", but found the compositions generally up to Webb's high standard as a songwriter, and the album as a whole a successful reintroduction of Webb as a pop artist.

== Track listing ==
All tracks are written by Jimmy Webb, except where noted.

No.	Title	Writer(s)	Length
1.	"The Highwayman"		3:51
2.	"If You See Me Getting Smaller I'm Leaving"		3:53
3.	"Mixed-Up Guy"		3:40
4.	"Christiaan, No"		3:07
5.	"Moment in a Shadow"		3:39
6.	"Sugarbird"		3:25
7.	"Where the Universes Are"		3:34
8.	"P.F. Sloan"		4:17
9.	"Dance to the Radio"	Fred Tackett	3:06
10.	"The Moon Is a Harsh Mistress"		3:06
11.	"Skylark (A Meditation)"	Jimmy Webb, Paul A. Skylar	3:37
Total length:			39:15

== Personnel ==
Music

- Jimmy Webb – vocals, keyboards
- George Martin – arranger, conductor, keyboards, synthesizer
- David Paich – keyboards, synthesizer
- Dean Parks, Fred Tackett – guitar
- Lowell George – slide guitar
- Herb Pedersen – banjo, 12-string guitar, background vocals
- Harry Bluestone – concertmaster
- David Hungate, Larry Knechtel, Dee Murray – bass guitar
- Harvey Mason – percussion
- Jim Gordon, Nigel Olsson – drums
- Kenny Loggins – vocals
- Billy Davis Jr. - vocals
- George Hawkins – vocals
- Sherlie Matthews – background vocals
- Susan Webb – background vocals
- Clydie King – background vocals

Production

- George Martin – producer
- John H. R. Mills – engineer
- John Mills – engineer
- George Tutko – engineer
- Bob Fisher – mastering
- Bob Defrin – art direction
- Steve Smith – photography
- Henry Diltz – cover photograph
- Richie Unterberger – liner notes
