= All My Love's Laughter =

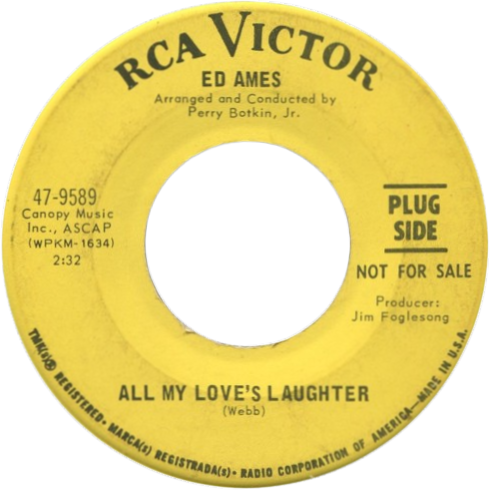

Single by Ed Ames

from the album The Very Best of Ed Ames
- B-side: "I'll Stay Lonely"
- Released: July 1968
- Studio: RCA's Music Center of the World, Hollywood, California
- Genre: Pop; easy listening
- Length: 2:32
- Label: RCA Victor Records
- Songwriter: Jimmy Webb
- Producer: Jim Foglesong

Ed Ames singles chronology
"Apologize" (1968)	"All My Love's Laughter" (1968)	"Kiss Her Now" (1968)

"All My Love's Laughter" is a 1968 song written by popular country pop composer and singer Jimmy Webb. It was most notably performed by Ed Ames, whose version was released as a single and hit the charts in the summer of 1968. It received positive reviews from music publications and critics and was later included on several RCA Records compilation albums.

== Background and release ==
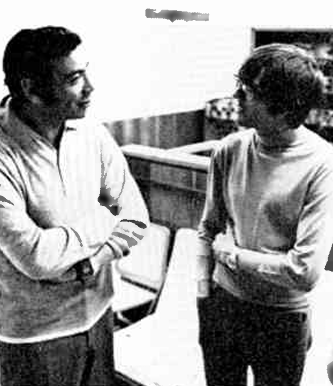
Singer Ed Ames standing with songwriter Jimmy Webb in the recording studio in mid-1968.

American singer Ed Ames achieved easy listening success with "Try to Remember" and "My Cup Runneth Over" in 1965 and 1967. Wanting to repeat the success, he collaborated with hit songwriter Jimmy Webb, whose song "Up, Up and Away" had just won multiple awards at the 10th Annual Grammy Awards hosted in February 1968. He subsequently wrote "All My Love's Laughter" especially for Ames. It was released as a seven-inch single by RCA Victor Records in July 1968 in the US, and in August 1968 in Canada. The B-side, "I'll Stay Lonely" was later included as a track on his The Windmills of Your Mind album, while "All My Love's Laughter" remained a non-album single. The song was noted by critics as to having "strong bass lines with light touches behind key phrases". The single was produced by Jim Foglesong, and arranged by Perry Botkin Jr. on both sides.

== Critical reception ==
Professional ratings
Review scores
Source	Rating
Billboard	Positive (Special Merit Spotlight)
Cashbox	Positive (Pick of the Week)
Record World	Positive (Single of the Week)

The single received a positive critical reception upon its release. Billboard magazine stated that "Penned by Jim Webb and performed beautifully by Ames, this potent ballad is a fine topper for his recent 'Apologize.'" Cashbox described it as a "Mysterious love imagery of Jim Webb is presented in a hymn-like melodic piece that brings Ed Ames back in the running with his newest single." The publication concluded that it's an "especially powerful outing that is bound to click with teen and adult format shows." Record World put the song in its "Singles of the Week" section, and said that "Ed Ames introduces a gorgeous, rolling new Jim Webb song called 'All My Love's Laughter.'"

== Chart performance ==
"All My Love's Laughter" debuted on the US Billboard Bubbling Under the Hot 100 in the issue dated August 10, 1968, peaking at No. 122 during a four-week run on the chart. The single reached a higher No. 106 on the Cashbox Looking Ahead Top 100 Singles. The single also climbed to No. 12 on the Billboard Easy Listening chart. The single was ranked higher on the Record World Top-Non Rock survey at No. 10.

== Charts ==
Chart performance for "All My Love's Laughter" by Ed Ames
Chart (1968)	Peak position
US Billboard Bubbling Under the Hot 100	122
US Billboard Easy Listening	12
US Cashbox (Looking Ahead) Top 100 Singles	106
US Record World Top-Non Rock	10
