= The Moon Is a Harsh Mistress (song) =

Song written by Jimmy Webb

"The Moon Is a Harsh Mistress" (sometimes titled "The Moon's a Harsh Mistress") is a song by American songwriter Jimmy Webb. It has become a much-recorded standard, without ever having charted as a single. Webb appropriated the title from the 1966 science fiction novel The Moon Is a Harsh Mistress by Robert A. Heinlein. The song is especially associated with Glen Campbell, who performed the song on his farewell tour, Judy Collins, Linda Ronstadt, and Joe Cocker, who first recorded the song in 1974.

The song is commonly presented in the key of G (to B♭). The song structure consists of three seven-line verses and a two-line coda. The first two verses have a rhyme scheme of AABACDC. The third verse modulates three half steps (from G to B♭), with the rhyme scheme altered to ABABCDC, and the coda repeating the DC. The time signature of the song is common time with the lines introduced between the second and third beat.

In a 2009 interview with Lisa Torem for Penny Black Music, Jimmy Webb talked about the influence of Robert Heinlein and the song's title:

Robert Heinlein, was a kind of early mentor of mine. I started reading his books when I was eight years old. ... I guess I was really getting more of my education out of science-fiction than out of public school. I was reading Ray Bradbury and Isaac Asimov and learning a great deal about the patois of the language itself and how these words were being used to create emotions. I was learning this from writers without even knowing it. ... "The Moon is a Harsh Mistress" was one of the best titles I've ever heard in my life. I really am guilty of appropriating something from another writer. In this case I had contact with Robert A. Heinlein's attorneys. I said, 'I want to write a song with the title, "The Moon is a Harsh Mistress". Can you ask Mr. Heinlein if it's okay with him?' They called me back and he said he had no objection to it.

Since Joe Cocker's first recording of the song in 1974, "The Moon Is a Harsh Mistress" has been recorded by a variety of artists, from traditional renditions by female singers such as Judy Collins, Linda Ronstadt, and Joan Baez, to versions by male singers such as Glen Campbell, and Michael Feinstein. Webb recorded the song three times, in 1977 for his El Mirage album, again in 1996 for his Ten Easy Pieces album and finally in 2012 in a duet with Joe Cocker for his 2013 album Still Within the Sound of My Voice.

The song has attracted a wide range of artists, including the Norwegian singer Radka Toneff, who recorded the song on her 1982 album Fairytales, which in a 2011 poll of Norwegian musicians was voted the best Norwegian album ever. Various instrumental versions have also been recorded, including the 1997 version by Charlie Haden and Pat Metheny on the album Beyond the Missouri Sky (Short Stories), which won a Grammy Award for Best Jazz Instrumental Album, Individual or Group. In June 2026, CBS News included the song in its list of the 250 essential American songs of the past 250 years.

== Recorded versions ==
- Joe Cocker on his album I Can Stand a Little Rain (1974) — lyrics
- Glen Campbell on his album Reunion: The Songs of Jimmy Webb (1974)
- Judy Collins on her album Judith (1975)
- Jeannie Lewis on her album Tears of Steel & the Clowning Calaveras (1975)
- Jimmy Webb on his album El Mirage (1977)
- Erick Nelson & Michele Pillar on their album The Misfit (1979)
- Radka Toneff and Steve Dobrogosz on the album Fairytales (1982)
- Linda Ronstadt on her album Get Closer (1982)
- Joan Baez on her album Recently (1987)
- Jonn Serrie on his album Midsummer Century (1993)
- Jimmy Webb on his album Ten Easy Pieces (1996)
- Pat Metheny and Charlie Haden on their jazz album Beyond The Missouri Sky (1997)
- Grażyna Auguścik on her album The River (2001)
- Jimmy LaFave on his album Texoma (2001)
- Michael Feinstein on his album Only One Life: The Songs of Jimmy Webb (2003)
- Tone Damli on her album Bliss (2005)
- Doug Parkinson on his album "Somewhere after Midnight" (2005)
- Christine Collister on her album Love (2005)
- Karrin Allyson on her album Wild for You (2006)
- Albert Lee on his album Road Runner (2006)
- Aleksandra & the Belgian Sweets on their album Island Girl (2008)
- Maureen McGovern on her album A Long and Winding Road (2008)
- Rumer (musician) as a B-side to her single "Slow" (2010)
- Celtic Woman (soloed by Lisa Kelly) on their album Celtic Woman: Songs from the Heart (2010)
- Nick Haywood Quartet on the album "1234" (2010)
- Nils Landgren on his album The Moon, the Stars, and You (2011)
- Silje Nergaard on her album Unclouded (2012)
- Josh Groban on his album All That Echoes (2013)
- Jimmy Webb with Joe Cocker on the album Still Within the Sound of My Voice (2013)
- Rita Marcotulli & Luciano Biondini on their album La strada invisibile (2014)
- John Hollenbeck on the album Songs I Like a Lot (2020)
