= The Webb Brothers =

- Origin: Chicago, Illinois, United States
- Genres: Rock
- Years active: 1998–present
- Labels: Warner Music; Atlantic Records

The Webb Brothers are an American rock band from Chicago, Illinois, who formed in 1998.

== History ==
The Webb Brothers are Christiaan, Justin, and James Webb, sons of the songwriter Jimmy Webb and Patsy Sullivan, a cover-girl model. They are grandsons of actor Barry Sullivan. Christiaan and Justin grew up mostly in Montclair, New Jersey, where they were one year apart through middle school and high school. They then attended Boston University together before moving to Chicago. In 1998 the band recorded a demo album called Beyond The Biosphere with drummer Neal Ostrovsky, who also recorded and mixed the tracks, and shopped it around to US record labels, but none expressed any interest.

However, the demo was picked up by London-based 7-inch-only label Easy!Tiger. It released Excerpts From Beyond The Biosphere (track listing: "Cold Fingers", "The Filth of It All" and "I'm Over and I Know It") in early 1999. The 1,000-strong pressing sold out immediately, and the band also came over to the UK to play several concerts.

Significant media attention followed and the band signed a recording contract with Warner Music, and Beyond The Biosphere was formally released on the major label in July 1999, and followed by Maroon on Atlantic Records in 2000. James then joined his brothers in 2003 for a self-titled release on 679 Recordings.

The Webb Brothers are now based in Los Angeles and have recorded several mini-projects, such as 'Music From The God Helmet'.

In 2009, The Webb Brothers teamed up with their father to form 'Jimmy Webb & The Webb Brothers', releasing the album Cottonwood Farm and touring the UK in November. Cornelius Webb plays bass for the band, and Cal Campbell (son of Glen Campbell) plays drums. Tim Walker provided pedal steel guitar.

The Webb Brothers commenced work on a new album in January 2010 which was put on hold while Christiaan completed work on his first solo album, A Man Possessed.

== Members ==
- Christiaan Webb – vocals, keyboard
- Justin Webb – vocals, guitar
- James Webb – vocals, guitar, bass, keyboard
- Cornelius Webb – bass
- Cal Campbell – drums, vocals, guitars
- Neal Ostrovsky – drums (1998–2004)
- Johnny (Beitr) Furman – bass (1998)
- John San Juan – bass, keyboards, guitars (1999–2000)

== Discography ==
- Excerpts from Beyond the Biosphere EP (Easy!Tiger, 1999)
- Beyond the Biosphere (Warner Music, 1999)
- Maroon (Atlantic, 2000) No. 105 (UK)
- The Webb Brothers (679, 2003)
- Odds & Ends (2005)
- Music from the God Helmet (2005)
- Cottonwood Farm by Jimmy Webb & The Webb Brothers (Proper, 2009)
- Maroon+ (2024)
