= Jimmy Webb =

American songwriter, composer, and singer (born 1946)

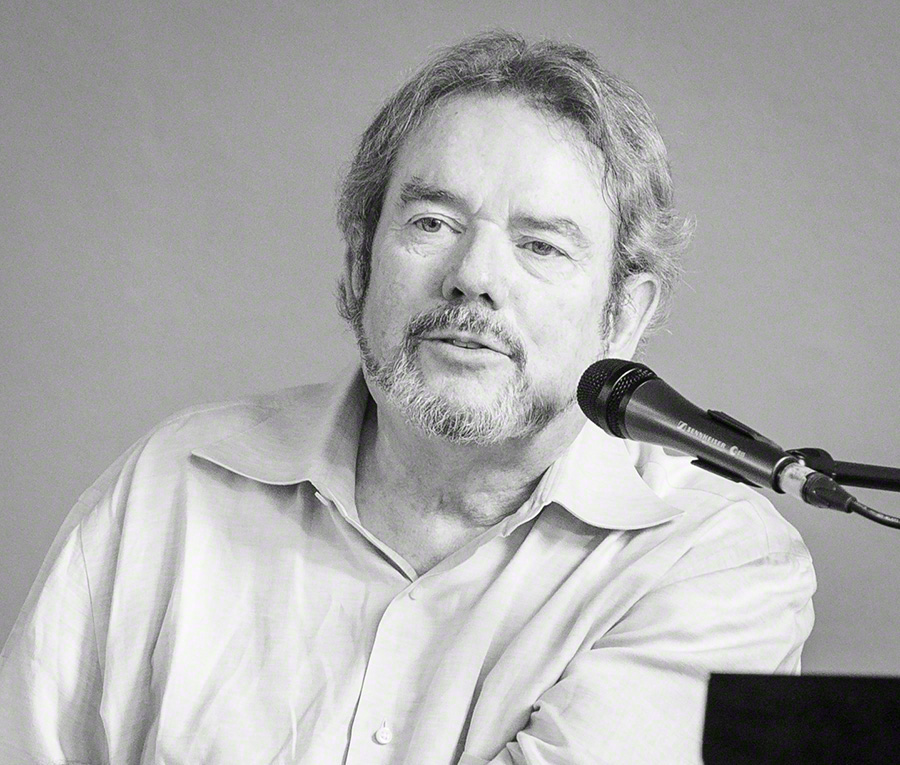
- Webb at Oslo Jazzfestival 2016

Background information
- Born: Jimmy Layne Webb; August 15, 1946 (age 80); Elk City, Oklahoma, U.S.
- Origin: Laverne, Oklahoma, U.S.
- Genres: Pop, country, rock
- Occupations: Songwriter, composer, singer
- Instruments: Piano, vocals
- Years active: 1965–present
- Labels: Epic; Reprise; Asylum; Atlantic; Columbia; Elektra
- Website: jimmywebb.com

Jimmy Layne Webb (born August 15, 1946) is an American songwriter, composer, and singer. He achieved success at an early age, winning the Grammy Award for Song of the Year at the age of 21.

Webb has written multiple platinum-selling songs, including "Up, Up and Away", "By the Time I Get to Phoenix", "MacArthur Park", "Wichita Lineman", "Worst That Could Happen", "Galveston", and "All I Know".

He had successful collaborations with Glen Campbell, Michael Feinstein, Linda Ronstadt, the 5th Dimension, the Highwaymen, the Supremes, Art Garfunkel, Richard Harris, and Carly Simon.

Webb was inducted into the Songwriters Hall of Fame in 1986 and the Nashville Songwriters Hall of Fame in 1990. He received the National Academy of Songwriters Lifetime Achievement Award in 1993, the Songwriters Hall of Fame Johnny Mercer Award in 2003, the ASCAP "Voice of Music" Award in 2006 and the Ivor Novello Special International Award in 2012.

According to BMI, his song "By the Time I Get to Phoenix" was the third most performed song in the 50 years between 1940 and 1990.

Webb is the only artist ever to receive Grammy Awards for music, lyrics and orchestration.

== Early life ==
Webb was born on August 15, 1946, in Elk City, Oklahoma, and raised in Laverne, Oklahoma. He grew up in a religiously conservative family; His father, Robert Lee Webb, was a Baptist minister and veteran of the United States Marine Corps who presided over rural churches in southwestern Oklahoma and west Texas. With his mother's encouragement, Webb learned piano and organ and by the age of 12 was playing in the choir of his father's churches, accompanied by his father on guitar and his mother on accordion. His father restricted radio listening to country music and white gospel.

During the late 1950s, Webb began applying his creativity to the music he was playing at his father's church, frequently improvising and rearranging the hymns. He began to write religious songs at this time, but his musical direction was soon influenced by the new music being played on the radio, including the music of Elvis Presley. In 1961, at the age of 14, he bought his first record, "Turn Around, Look at Me", by Glen Campbell. Webb said he was drawn to the singer's distinctive voice and they became friends a few years later.

In 1964, Webb and his family moved to Southern California, where he attended San Bernardino Valley College, studying music. During this time, he lived in Colton, with his family. Following the death of his mother, Sylvia, in 1964, his father made plans to return to Oklahoma. Webb decided to stay in California to continue his music studies and to pursue a career as a songwriter in Los Angeles. He would later recall his father warning him about his musical aspirations, saying that "This songwriting thing is going to break your heart." Seeing that his son was determined, however, he gave him $40, saying "It's not much, but it's all I have."

== Career ==
=== Early success, 1965–1969 ===
After transcribing other people's music for a small music publisher in Hollywood, Webb was signed to a songwriting contract with Jobete Music, the publishing arm of Motown Records. The first commercial recording of a Jimmy Webb song was "My Christmas Tree" by The Supremes, which appeared on their 1965 Merry Christmas album. The following year, Webb met singer and producer Johnny Rivers, who signed him to a publishing deal and recorded his song "By the Time I Get to Phoenix" on his 1966 album Changes.

In 1967, Rivers released Rewind, an album featuring seven Webb songs, including "Do What You Gotta Do" and "Tunesmith", a song also recorded that year by Vikki Carr for her album It Must Be Him. That same year, Rivers turned to Webb for material for a new group Rivers was producing called the 5th Dimension. Webb contributed five songs to their debut album, Up, Up and Away, including the title track, which was released as a single in May 1967 and reached the Top Ten. The group's follow-up album, The Magic Garden, was also released in 1967 and featured eleven additional Webb songs, including "Worst That Could Happen".

In November 1967, Glen Campbell released his version of "By the Time I Get to Phoenix", which reached number 26. At the 1968 Grammy Awards, "Up, Up and Away" was named Record of the Year (1967) and Song of the Year (1967). "Up, Up and Away" and "By the Time I Get to Phoenix" received eight Grammy Awards between them.

In 1968, Time acknowledged Webb's range, proficiency, and "gift for strong, varied rhythms, inventive structures, and rich, sometimes surprising harmonies". That year, the string of successful Webb songs continued with the 5th Dimension's "Paper Cup" and "Carpet Man" reaching the Top 40, Glen Campbell's "Wichita Lineman" selling over a million copies, and Johnny Maestro & the Brooklyn Bridge scoring a gold record with "Worst That Could Happen", a song originally recorded by the 5th Dimension.

Webb formed his own production and publishing company that year, Canopy, and scored a hit with its first project, an unlikely album with Irish actor Richard Harris singing an album of all Webb songs. One of the songs, "MacArthur Park", was a long, complex piece with multiple movements that was originally rejected by the group The Association. Despite the song's seven minutes and twenty-one seconds length, Harris's version reached No. 2 on the Hot 100 on June 22, 1968, and No. 4 on the UK Singles Chart on July 24. The album, A Tramp Shining, stayed on the charts for almost a year. Webb and Harris produced a follow-up album, The Yard Went On Forever, which was also successful.

Further raising Webb's stature as a songwriter, "By the Time I Get to Phoenix" was performed by Frank Sinatra on the latter's 1968 album Cycles. Sinatra would go on to praise "By the Time I Get to Phoenix" as "the greatest torch song ever written".

At the 1969 Grammy Awards, Webb accepted awards for "By the Time I Get to Phoenix", "Wichita Lineman", and "MacArthur Park". In 2019 "Wichita Lineman" was added to the National Recording Registry.

In 1969, Glen Campbell continued the streak of Webb hits with the gold record "Galveston" and "Where's the Playground Susie". Webb and Campbell had first met during the production of a General Motors commercial. Webb arrived at the recording session with his Beatle-length hair and approached the conservative singer, who looked up from his guitar and said, "Get a haircut." That same year, two Webb songs became hits for the second time with Isaac Hayes' soulful version of "By the Time I Get to Phoenix" and Waylon Jennings' Grammy-winning country version of "MacArthur Park". On Frank Sinatra's 1969 album My Way, the singer dove deeper into Webb's songbook with a version of "Didn't We?", a number that was originally done by Richard Harris in 1968 and released as the B-side of "MacArthur Park". Webb finished the year by writing, arranging, and producing Thelma Houston's first album, Sunshower.

As the decade came to a close, so too did Webb's string of hit singles. He began to withdraw from the formulaic process in which he worked and began to experiment with his music. He started work on a semi-autobiographical Broadway musical called His Own Dark City, which reflected the emotional displacement he felt at the time. He also wrote music for the films How Sweet It Is! and Tell Them Willie Boy Is Here.

=== Singer-songwriter years, 1970–1982 ===
Webb's career as a singer-songwriter got off to a rough start with the "counterfeit" album Jim Webb Sings Jim Webb, released by Epic Records in 1968. According to Webb, the album was produced "by a bunch of ruffians from some old demos of mine and tarted up to sound like 'MacArthur Park'". Beginning in 1970, Webb released six original albums of his own songs: Words and Music (1970), And So: On (1971), Letters (1972), Land's End (1974), El Mirage (1977), and Angel Heart (1982). Despite the critical reception that followed each of these projects, Webb has never been as successful as a performer as he has been as a songwriter and arranger. Each album was noted for its inventive music and memorable lyrics.

Webb's debut album as a performer, Words and Music, was released on Reprise Records in late 1970 to critical acclaim. Rolling Stone writer Jon Landau called one of the album's cuts, "P.F. Sloan", a "masterpiece [that] could not be improved upon". The album also features the ambitious song trilogy "Music for an Unmade Movie". Webb's 1971 follow-up album, And So: On, proved equally appealing to critics. Rolling Stone declared the album "another impressive step in the conspiracy to recover his identity from the housewives of America and rightfully install him at the forefront of contemporary composers/performers." The album features the songs "Met Her on a Plane", "All My Love's Laughter", and "Marionette". Also in 1971, the Three Degrees are featured in the movie The French Connection giving a rendition of Webb's song "Everybody Gets To Go To The Moon", originally recorded in 1969 by Thelma Houston.

Webb's 1972 album Letters, which features his own rendition of "Galveston", met with similar praise. Music critic Bruce Eder called Letters the "most surprising, diverse, and possibly the most satisfying of all of Jimmy Webb's early solo LPs" and "arguably the best of Webb's solo albums". In his review of the album, Peter Reilly of Stereo Review wrote, "Jimmy Webb is the most important pop music figure to emerge since Bob Dylan." The album also features the songs "Campo de Encino", an homage to his park-like residence in Encino, California, during the 1970s, "When Can Brown Begin", and "Piano". He also produced in 1972 album, "The Supremes Produced And Arranged By Jimmy Webb." for The Supremes, featuring Jean Terrell, Mary Wilson and Linda Lawrence. The album sold poorly and did not chart successfully.

In 1974, Webb released Land's End on Asylum Records. Unlike his previous albums, which tended to be underproduced, Webb was able to achieve a more heavily produced pop/rock sound on Land's End, which was recorded in England with the help of an all-star session band that included Joni Mitchell, Ringo Starr, and Nigel Olsson. The album contains "a thematic consistency in that most of its songs were tales of romantic discord". While Webb continued to improve as a singer, he "still hadn't found an identity as a solo artist". The album features the songs "Ocean in His Eyes", "Just This One Time", and "Crying in My Sleep".

In 1977, Webb released El Mirage on Atlantic Records. Produced, arranged, and conducted by The Beatles' former producer, George Martin, the album was Webb's "most polished effort yet as a performer". William Ruhlmann observed, "These were lush tracks full of tasty playing and warm string charts on which Webb's thin tenor was buoyed by numerous background vocalists, the whole an excellent example of the style known as 'West Coast pop'." The album contains several strong compositions, including "The Highwayman", which would later become a number one country hit for Waylon Jennings, Willie Nelson, Johnny Cash, and Kris Kristofferson, who named their super group The Highwaymen after the song. Their version of "The Highwayman" won a Grammy Award for Best Country Song. El Mirage also features the songs "If You See Me Getting Smaller I'm Leaving", a newly arranged version of "P.F. Sloan", and "The Moon is a Harsh Mistress", which had already been recorded by Joe Cocker, Glen Campbell, and Judy Collins. Despite the positive critical response to the album, El Mirage did not succeed in redefining Webb as a performer as he had hoped.

Webb's final solo album from this period, Angel Heart, was released in 1982 on Lorimar Records. Like its predecessor, the album drew upon the talents of top Los Angeles session musicians to produce a classic West Coast pop sound, enhanced by guest vocal harmonies by Gerry Beckley, Michael McDonald, Graham Nash, Kenny Loggins, Daryl Hall, and Stephen Bishop. Unlike his previous solo albums, however, Angel Heart lacked the quality material usually associated with the composer. Apart from "Scissors Cut" and "In Cars", which were previously recorded by Art Garfunkel, the album offered few high points, despite its polished production. A decade would pass before Webb released his next solo album.

Throughout the 1970s and into the 1980s, Webb's songs continued to be recorded by some of the industry's most successful artists. In 1972, Jimmy Webb produced The Supremes' last album featuring Jean Terrell as lead singer, The Supremes Produced and Arranged by Jimmy Webb. Webb is quoted as saying he had a crush on Mary Wilson when he wrote and produced "I Keep It Hid" featuring her on lead vocals. In 1977, the initial release of Art Garfunkel's Watermark album consisted exclusively of songs by Webb. In 1978, Donna Summer's disco version of "MacArthur Park" became a multi-million selling vinyl single that was number one on the American pop music charts for three weeks. In 1980, Thelma Houston recorded "Before There Could Be Me", "Breakwater Cat", "Gone", "Long Lasting Love", and "What Was that Song" on her album Breakwater Cat. Leah Kunkel recorded "Never Gonna Lose My Dream of Love Again" and "Let's Begin" for her album I Run with Trouble. The latter was performed live in 1980 by the born-again Bob Dylan. Tanya Tucker recorded "Tennessee Woman" on her album Dreamlovers. And Frank Sinatra did his own cover of "MacArthur Park" on the 1980 album Trilogy: Past Present Future.

In 1981, Art Garfunkel recorded "Scissors Cut", "In Cars", and "That's All I've Got to Say" for his album Scissors Cut, and Arlo Guthrie recorded "Oklahoma Nights" on his album Power of Love. In 1982, Linda Ronstadt recorded "The Moon Is a Harsh Mistress" and "Easy for You to Say" on her album Get Closer. That same year, Joe Cocker recorded "Just Like Always" on his album Sheffield Steel.

In 1981 Webb moved to New York state, and said, "One day I wondered what happened to the Seventies and all those grandiose schemes."

=== Large-scale projects, 1982–1992 ===
From 1982 to 1992, Webb turned his focus from solo performing to large-scale projects, such as film scores, Broadway musicals, and classical music. In 1982, he produced the soundtrack for the film The Last Unicorn, an animated children's tale, with the musical group America performing five new Jimmy Webb songs: "The Last Unicorn", "Man's Road", "In the Sea", "Now That I'm a Woman", and "That's All I've Got to Say". The rest of the album contains instrumental music composed, arranged, and conducted by Webb. That same year, he composed the soundtrack to all episodes of the TV series Seven Brides for Seven Brothers.

The theme music for the 1984–85 TV sitcom E/R was written by Webb. Then in 1985, Glen Campbell recorded Webb's "Cowboy Hall of Fame" and "Shattered" for the album It's Just a Matter of Time. And heavyweights Johnny Cash, Waylon Jennings, Willie Nelson, and Kris Kristofferson recorded "Highwayman" on the album Highwayman. In 1988, Toto recorded "Home of the Brave" on the album The Seventh One. Kenny Rankin recorded "She Moves, Eyes Follow" for the album Hiding in Myself. And in 1989, Linda Ronstadt recorded the album Cry Like a Rainstorm, Howl Like the Wind, which featured four Jimmy Webb songs: "Still Within the Sound of My Voice" (with Webb playing piano), "Adios" (with orchestral arrangement by Webb), "I Keep It Hid" (with Webb playing piano), and "Shattered". In 1990, John Denver recorded "Postcard from Paris" on the album The Flower That Shattered the Stone. In 1991, Kenny Rogers recorded "They Just Don't Make Em Like You Anymore" on the album Back Home Again.

In 1986, Webb produced a cantata, The Animals' Christmas, with Art Garfunkel, Amy Grant, and the London Symphony Orchestra. The cantata tells the Christmas story from the perspective of animals.

In 1987, Webb produced the soundtrack for the film The Hanoi Hilton. That same year, he reunited with Campbell for the album Still Within the Sound of My Voice, for which he wrote the title song. They followed this up in 1988 with an album composed almost entirely of Jimmy Webb songs, Light Years. The album included the title song, as well as "Lightning in a Bottle", "If These Walls Could Speak" (which was also recorded by Amy Grant that year) and "Our Movie". Two songs from 1982's Seven Brides for Seven Brothers also appear on the album.

In 1992, Webb completed a musical called Instant Intimacy, which he developed with the Tennessee Repertory Theatre. The musical contained new songs that he and others would later record, including "What Does a Woman See in a Man", "I Don't Know How to Love You Anymore", and "Is There Love After You". That same year, Webb performed live at the club Cinegrill, performing "What Does a Woman See in a Man" and introducing several additional new songs, including "Sandy Cove" and an old folk hymn, "I Will Arise".

=== Solo artist, 1993–present ===
Since 1993, Webb has produced five critically acclaimed solo albums: Suspending Disbelief (1993), Ten Easy Pieces (1996), Twilight of the Renegades (2005), Just Across the River (2010), and Still Within the Sound of My Voice (2013). He has continued to expand his creative landscape to include musicals, commercial jingles, and film scores.

In 1994, Webb teamed with Nanci Griffith to contribute the song "If These Old Walls Could Speak" to the AIDS benefit album Red Hot + Country produced by the Red Hot Organization.

In 1997, Webb co-produced Carly Simon's Film Noir album and contributed his vocals, orchestration, and piano skills to the project, which was filmed for an AMC documentary (which premiered in September 1997). He also co-wrote the song "Film Noir" with Simon and reprised his role as arranger and co-producer on Simon's 2008 album, This Kind of Love.

In 1998, Webb completed his first book, Tunesmith: Inside the Art of Songwriting, which was published by Hyperion Books. It was well received by songwriters and performers and became a best seller. One book reviewer described it as "a companion every serious songwriter should read, and read again, and keep handy for referral".

In 2007, he released a live album of his show Live and at Large, which was recorded in the United Kingdom. The album included personal stories and anecdotes about Richard Harris, Waylon Jennings, Harry Nilsson, Glen Campbell, Art Garfunkel, Frank Sinatra, and Rosemary Clooney.

Webb appears in the 2008 documentary The Wrecking Crew providing thoughtful and descriptive insights into the world of California session musicians in the 1960s.

In June 2010, Webb released Just Across the River, an album of newly arranged Webb songs that featured guest appearances by Vince Gill, Billy Joel, Willie Nelson, Lucinda Williams, Jackson Browne, Glen Campbell, Michael McDonald, Mark Knopfler, JD Souther, and Linda Ronstadt.

In 2011, Webb was unanimously elected chairman of the Songwriters Hall of Fame, replacing Hal David who retired after ten years in the position.

In May 2012, Webb traveled to London to receive the Ivor Novello Special International Award, which recognizes non-British writers and composers who have made an extraordinary contribution to the global musical landscape. In September 2012, Fantasy Records released Glen Campbell and Jimmy Webb: In Session, a collaborative album by Campbell and Webb. The album and its accompanying DVD were filmed and recorded in December 1988 at the Hamilton, Ontario, studios of CHCH-TV as part of the Canadian concert series In Session.

Decades after he sold his first song, Webb's influence on his fellow musicians is ongoing. Rock singer-songwriter Bruce Springsteen has acknowledged that his 2019 album Western Stars was profoundly impacted by Webb's music, and country music singer Keith Urban cites Webb as his earliest songwriting inspiration.

Webb continues to perform throughout the United States and abroad. In 2017 he published an autobiography, The Cake and the Rain: A Memoir.

In 2024, Webb's song "MacArthur Park" by both Donna Summer and Richard Harris was included in the Beetlejuice Beetlejuice soundtrack. In 2026, Alysa Liu used the Donna Summer version in her 2026 gold-medal-winning Olympic skating performance, causing increased popularity and streams to increase over 1200%.

== Emotional content of songs ==
While some of Webb's songs are happy, such as "Up, Up and Away", he has said that "The territory I tend to inhabit is that sort of 'crushed lonely hearts' thing. The first part of a relationship is usually that white-hot center when all the happy songs come. When that's gone it can be devastating, and that's when the sorrowful songs come."

== Personal life ==
In 1967 Webb wrote "MacArthur Park"; the inspiration for the song was his relationship and breakup with Susie Horton. The breakup was also the primary influence for his 1965 composition "By the Time I Get to Phoenix".

Webb married cover girl Patricia "Patsy" Sullivan, the mother of his 17-month-old son Christiaan, in 1974. The youngest child of screen actor Barry Sullivan and Swedish actress and model Gita Hall, Sullivan was 12 years old and Webb was 22 when they met on a photo shoot for the cover of Teen Magazine in 1968. Webb became romantically involved with Sullivan, the face of Yardley Cosmetics, a year later. She gave birth to their son Christiaan, the first of their six children, when she was 16 years old. They married on July 13, 1974, in a wedding held at Jim Messina's Ojai, California, ranch. Musicians who attended the wedding included Joe Cocker, Kenny Loggins, Joni Mitchell, Harry Nilsson, and Ike Turner, plus actors Beau Bridges, Lynda Carter, Andrew Prine, Jessica Walter, and Jack Warden. They were divorced in 1996.

Two sons, Christiaan and Justin, formed a rock band, the Webb Brothers. Their brother, James, later joined the band. Webb collaborated with his sons on the album Cottonwood Farm, which also featured his father Bob Webb.

In 2004, Webb married Laura Savini, a host and producer for the Public Broadcasting Service (PBS). From 1996 to 2011, Savini was vice president of marketing and communications at WLIW, a PBS station on Long Island, New York. The couple first met backstage on New Year's Eve 1999 at Billy Joel's 2000 Years: The Millennium Concert at Madison Square Garden. Webb said, "I was drunk at the time ... I met her again a couple of years later and barely remembered meeting her the first time." Their second meeting took place when Savini interviewed Webb for her series on the arts.

=== Friendships ===
Webb had close personal relationships with Glen Campbell and actor Richard Harris, both of whom had great success singing his songs. Hearing Campbell on the radio singing "Turn Around, Look at Me" inspired him when he was 15 years old in 1961. A life-long friend, Webb thought of Campbell as a "big brother".

He said of Richard Harris, the Irish actor with a reputation as a serious alcoholic and substance abuser, "Richard was a major figure in my life at a time when I needed someone like him to show me how to smoke a cigarette and drink whisky. It was kind of learning how men really live, and we had the time of our lives."

=== Substance abuse ===
In his memoir and in interviews with the press, Webb has been frank about his problems with substance abuse, which included frequent use of cocaine, marijuana, and alcohol. He stated that using cocaine was pervasive in the music industry during the 1970s as recording sessions typically were long and cocaine provided the energy to keep on recording. "[Cocaine] had become legal tender. You could get studio musicians with it. You could get a date for the evening. Cocaine was in the executive suites of all the major record companies. It became cool; there was no social stigma attached to it. Au contraire: Most people didn't set off for an evening's dinner engagement and party after without your stash."

Webb suffered a near-fatal overdose of phencyclidine in 1973 while snorting the drug with his friend, singer-songwriter Harry Nilsson. He used cocaine with Nilsson and John Lennon during the former Beatle's "Lost Weekend" and often supplied Lennon with drugs. He ceased his cocaine habit in the early 1990s. He gave up alcohol and marijuana and cocaine after his divorce and revived his performing career. A heavy user of both substances, Webb has been clean and sober since 2000.

Webb once owned Carroll Shelby's 427 AC Cobra Super Snake, a twin of the Cobra that Bill Cosby talked about on his album 200 M.P.H..

== Honors and awards ==
- 1967 Grammy Award for Song of the Year ("Up, Up and Away")
- 1969 Grammy Award for Best Arrangement Accompanying Vocalist(s) ("MacArthur Park")
- 1969 Oklahoma Baptist University Phi Mu Alpha Sinfonia honorary membership, Pi Tau Chapter
- 1986 Grammy Award for Best Country Song ("Highwayman")
- 1986 National Academy of Popular Music Songwriter's Hall of Fame
- 1990 Nashville Songwriters Hall of Fame
- 1993 National Academy of Songwriters Lifetime Achievement Award
- 1999 Oklahoma Hall of Fame
- 1999 ASCAP Board of Directors
- 2000 Songwriters Hall of Fame Board of Directors
- 2003 Songwriters Hall of Fame, Johnny Mercer Award
- 2006 ASCAP Voice of Music Award
- 2010 Songwriters Hall of Fame, Chairman Emeritus, 2010–2014
- 2012 Ivor Novello Awards, Special International Award
- 2013 Great American Songbook Hall of Fame, Songbook Award
- 2013 Oklahoma Music Hall of Fame
- 2019 National Recording Registry ("Wichita Lineman")

== Discography ==
(see also: List of songs written by Jimmy Webb)

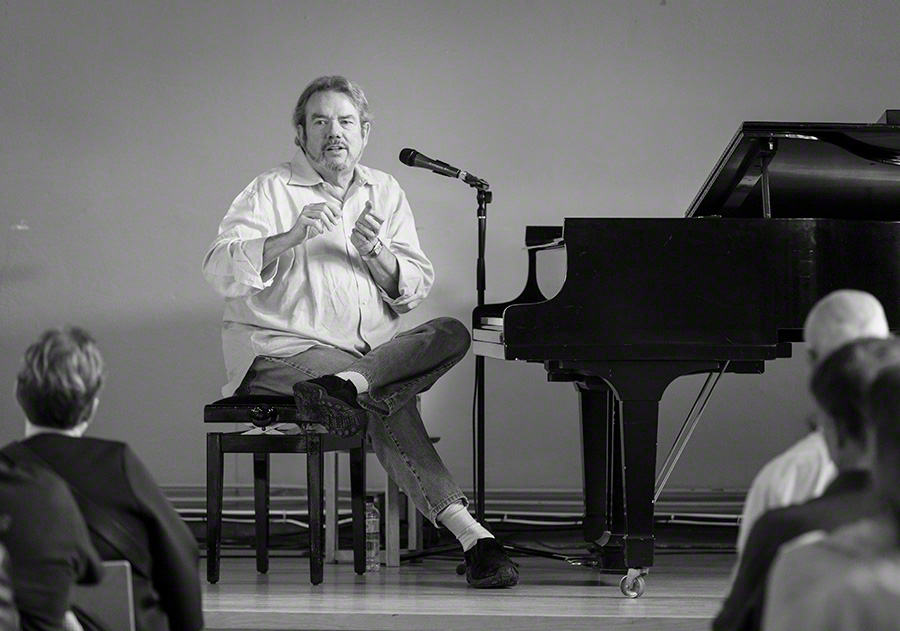
Webb at Oslo Jazzfestival 2016

=== Original albums ===
- Jim Webb Sings Jim Webb (1968)
- Words and Music (1970)
- And So: On (1971)
- Letters (1972)
- Land's End (1974)
- El Mirage (1977)
- Angel Heart (1982)
- Suspending Disbelief (1993)
- Ten Easy Pieces (1996)
- Twilight of the Renegades (2005)
- Live and at Large (2007)
- Just Across the River (2010)
- Still Within the Sound of My Voice (2013)
- SlipCover (2019)
- Yours for the Taking: The Found Songs of Jimmy Webb (2026)

=== Collaborative albums ===
- Up, Up, and Away (1967) by The 5th Dimension
- The Magic Garden (1967) by The 5th Dimension
- Rewind (1967) by Johnny Rivers
- A Tramp Shining (1968) by Richard Harris
- The Yard Went On Forever (1968) by Richard Harris
- Sunshower (1969) by Thelma Houston
- The Supremes Produced and Arranged by Jimmy Webb (1972) by The Supremes
- Reunion: The Songs of Jimmy Webb (1974) by Glen Campbell
- Stars (1975) by Cher
- Earthbound (1975) by The 5th Dimension
- Live at the Royal Festival Hall (1977) by Glen Campbell
- Watermark (1977) by Art Garfunkel
- Breakwater Cat (1980) by Thelma Houston
- The Last Unicorn (1982) by America
- The Animals' Christmas (1986) by Art Garfunkel and Amy Grant
- Light Years (1988) by Glen Campbell
- Cry Like a Rainstorm, Howl Like the Wind (1989) by Linda Ronstadt
- Film Noir (1997) by Carly Simon
- Only One Life: The Songs of Jimmy Webb (2003) by Michael Feinstein
- This Kind of Love (2008) by Carly Simon
- Cottonwood Farm (2009) by Jimmy Webb and The Webb Brothers
- Glen Campbell and Jimmy Webb: In Session (2012) by Glen Campbell and Jimmy Webb

=== Compilation albums ===
- Tribute to Burt Bacharach and Jim Webb (1972)
- Archive (1994)
- And Someone Left the Cake Out in the Rain... (1998)
- Reunited with Jimmy Webb 1974–1988 (1999)
- Tunesmith: The Songs of Jimmy Webb (2003)
- The Moon's a Harsh Mistress: Jimmy Webb in the Seventies (2004)
- Archive & Live (2005)
