= P.F. Sloan (song) =

Song by Jimmy Webb

Single by Jimmy Webb

from the album Words and Music
- B-side: "Psalm One-Five-O"
- Released: December 21, 1970
- Recorded: 1970
- Studio: MCA Studios, Universal City, California
- Label: Reprise Records
- Songwriter: Jimmy Webb
- Producer: Jimmy Webb

Jimmy Webb singles chronology
| "Lost Generation" (1970) | "P.F. Sloan" (1970) | "Love Hurts" (1972) |

"P.F. Sloan" is a song written by singer-songwriter Jimmy Webb about his contemporary P. F. Sloan. It first appeared on Webb's solo debut album, Words and Music, in 1970. He also rerecorded it on his 1977 album, El Mirage.

British singer-songwriter Rumer has also recorded it, and it was released as the lead single from her second studio album, Boys Don't Cry, on May 4, 2012.

== Rumer version ==
"P.F. Sloan"

Single by Rumer

from the album Boys Don't Cry
- Released: 4 May 2012
- Recorded: 2011
- Genre: Pop, soul
- Length: 4:10
- Label: Atlantic Records
- Songwriter: Jimmy Webb

Rumer singles chronology
| "Am I Forgiven" (2011) | "P.F. Sloan" (2012) | "Sara Smile" (2012) |

=== Music video ===
A music video to accompany the release of Rumer's version was first released onto YouTube on May 22, 2012 at a total length of four minutes and seventeen seconds.

=== Track listings ===
iTunes EP
| No. | Title | Length |
|---|---|---|
| 1. | "P.F. Sloan" | 4:10 |
| 2. | "My Cricket" | 2:50 |

=== Chart performance ===
| Chart (2012) | Peak position |
|---|---|
| Belgium (Ultratip Bubbling Under Flanders) | 52 |

=== Release history ===
| Region | Date | Format | Label |
|---|---|---|---|
| United Kingdom | 4 May 2012 | Digital download | Atlantic Records |
