= Johnny Maestro =

American doo-wop and pop singer (1939–2010)

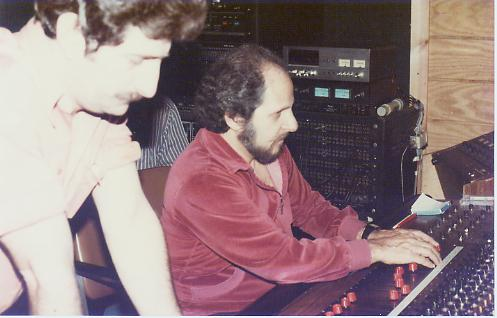
- Maestro (right) in 1985

Background information
- Also known as: Johnny Maestro
- Born: John Peter Mastrangelo; May 7, 1939; Manhattan, New York City, U.S.
- Died: March 24, 2010 (aged 70) Cape Coral, Florida, U.S.
- Genres: doo-wop, pop
- Instruments: vocals, guitar
- Works: Johnny Maestro & The Brooklyn Bridge discography
- Years active: 1956–2010
- Formerly of: The Crests; The Del-Satins; The Brooklyn Bridge

John Peter Mastrangelo (May 7, 1939 – March 24, 2010), known as Johnny Maestro, was an American pop singer. He was the lead vocalist for the doo-wop group The Crests, whose 1958 song "16 Candles" achieved number two on the Billboard Hot 100. He later led The Brooklyn Bridge, who are best known for their cover of the 1968 Jimmy Webb song "Worst That Could Happen".

Maestro continued singing as frontman for The Brooklyn Bridge. With this group, they were inducted into three major music halls of fame. After his death from cancer in 2010, a section of Mason and Midland Avenue in Staten Island was renamed to "Johnny Maestro Way" in his honor in 2011.

== Early life ==
John Peter Mastrangelo was born on the Lower East Side of Manhattan, New York City on May 7, 1939, one of three children of Salvatore and Grace Mastrangelo. Salvatore was born on December 17, 1913, and died on December 26, 1994, also in New York. Grace was born on April 27, 1913, in America and died on April 15, 1993, in New York. His paternal grandparents were Giovanni "John" Mastrangelo (born November 17, 1887, in Italy – died June 1964 in Staten Island) and Porcia Maria "Mary" Mastrangelo (née Morano) (born January 8, 1888, in Italy – died August 1978 in Staten Island).

One of his main influences was singer Johnnie Ray: "When I was a youngster, I would listen to him, he was one of the first white soul singers. He put a lot of feeling into his songs and let it all hang out. I would also listen to Alan Freed, and the groups that really impressed me were Willie Winfield and the Harptones, the Flamingos and the Moonglows. It was such a great sound. I really got into harmonies."

Mastrangelo graduated from Charles Evans Hughes High School (later renamed to Bayard Rustin Educational Complex) in 1956. He then attended Borough of Manhattan Community College.

== Career ==
=== The Crests ===
In 1956, seventeen-year old Mastrangelo (performing as Johnny Maestro) joined The Crests. The band was formed by J.T. Carter and other street kids living in Manhattan, including first tenor Talmadge “Tommy” Gough, second tenor Harold Torres, and soprano Patricia Van Dross (the older sister to Luther Vandross), all residents of the Alfred E. Smith housing project on the Lower East Side of Manhattan. In 1956, Mastrangelo, who lived on nearby Mulberry Street, met the group at the Henry Street Settlement House. "The three background singers had originally formed the group themselves. When I met them, they were learning harmonies from a gospel singer. They were looking for a lead singer, and they lived in the same neighborhood as I did. They had heard I was singing with a couple of friends in the neighborhood, approached me and asked if I would sing with them. I was very impressed with the sound they were getting and joined them. We’d sing in the park and at dances and on the trains."

In 1958, they recorded the song "16 Candles", that went to number two on the Billboard Hot 100 that same year. They were one of the first multi-racial groups. In just more than four years, the group placed 13 records on Billboard's pop chart, six inside the Top 20 including "Step By Step" and "The Angels Listened In", defining examples of the rock ’n’ roll vocal group genre. At one point, it was said that Tony Orlando was a member of the Crests. After leaving the Crests in the early 1960s, Maestro performed briefly as a solo singer.

=== The Brooklyn Bridge ===
In 1968, Maestro joined The Del-Satins. The same year, Maestro combined the Del-Satins and Long Island group The Rhythm Method to become the group The Brooklyn Bridge. Johnny told The New York Times in 1994 about choosing the name "Brooklyn Bridge": "So we decided we’d pick a new one, we were sitting around the office, and someone said: ‘This is going to be difficult. We have 11 people. That’s hard to sell. It’s easier to sell the Brooklyn Bridge.’ We said, ‘That’s the name!’".

The Brooklyn Bridge (also credited as "Johnny Maestro and the Brooklyn Bridge", "Johnny and the Bridge" and "The Bridge") rehearsed their unusual combination of smooth vocal harmonies and full horns, and signed a recording contract with Buddah Records. Their first release, a version of the Jimmy Webb song "Worst That Could Happen" (previously recorded by The 5th Dimension), reached No. 3 on the Billboard pop chart. It sold over one and a quarter million copies, and was awarded a gold disc by the R.I.A.A. The follow-up, "Welcome Me Love", and its flip side, "Blessed is the Rain" — both by Tony Romeo — each reached the Top 50. A dramatic version of "You'll Never Walk Alone" and the controversial "Your Husband, My Wife" also reached the middle ranges of the chart. The group sold over 10 million records by 1972, including LP sales, mostly produced by Wes Farrell. Appearances on The Ed Sullivan Show, The Della Reese Show, and other programs helped to bring the group to the national stage.

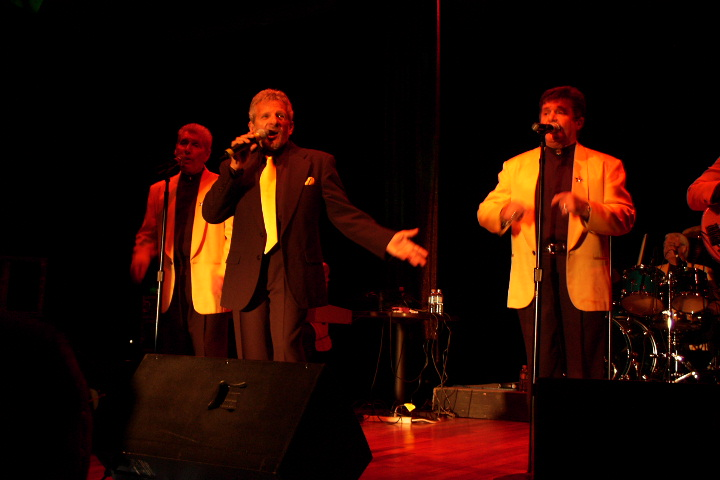
Maestro (center) on stage with The Brooklyn Bridge at The Celebrity Club in Las Vegas, Nevada on April 29, 2006

The Brooklyn Bridge performed "Worst That Could Happen" on the Ed Sullivan Show in December 1968. Host Ed Sullivan mispronounced Maestro's surname as MAY-stroh instead of MY-stroh. At first, the Bridge had eleven members, but after the fame of "Worst That Could Happen" started to die down, the guitarists, bassist, organist, and brass members were kicked out, and Maestro, the three backing vocalists, and the drummers remained, and all but the latter began playing additional instruments on stage. Maestro played rhythm guitar on stage. He carried on with The Brooklyn Bridge, despite the band claiming a one-hit wonder status.

In the following decades, The Brooklyn Bridge performed at many fundraising events on Staten Island such as the Borough President's "Back to the Beach'' concert. He also performed for the New York City Fire Department and Police Department, the United States Military, Italian American Association, as well as church and school fundraisers. He performed on the Jerry Lewis Telethon.

When Maestro died in 2010, the band carried on without him in his honor, and his spot as lead vocalist was taken by Joe Esposito, best known for his song "You're the Best", featured in the 1984 film The Karate Kid.

== Personal life and death ==
His first wife was Alma Jean Degler Mastrangelo-Ferguson, who he married in 1964. She was born on November 24, 1942, in Middletown, Pennsylvania and died on July 5, 2000, in Billings, Montana. He married his second wife, Grace, in December 1985. They remained married until his death.

Maestro was a Humanitarian. He lived in Islip, New York until 2003, when he moved to Cape Coral, Florida, where he died of kidney cancer on March 24, 2010, at the age of 70. He was survived by his wife Grace and three children, Lisa, Brad, and Tracy. Maestro had been diagnosed with the cancer in 2009. His last performance was at Connecticut's Mohegan Sun Arena in January 2010, nine weeks before his death, as part of Bowzer's Rock ’N’ Doo Wop Party.

Maestro had kept his illness hidden from the public. Brooklyn Bridge bassist Jim Rosica said: "He was frail and a little jaundiced, and he had torn the ligaments in his shoulder, so he had his arm in a sling underneath his jacket, we hadn’t disclosed to anyone that he had cancer, but it didn’t take a rocket scientist to figure out something was seriously wrong. But when Johnny went onstage, he just nailed it."

"The Great Physician", a song Maestro recorded in 1960, was believed to be lost for more than fifty years, before a record of it was recovered. It was showcased in the "From the Vault" series that focuses on Coed Records’ lost master tapes.

== Honors ==
The Brooklyn Bridge was inducted into the Vocal Group Hall of Fame in 2005. They were inducted into the South Carolina Music (Rhythm & Blues) Hall of Fame in May 2006 and the Long Island Music Hall of Fame on October 15, 2006.

On March 26, 2011, the City of New York honored him by renaming the intersection of Mason Avenue and Midland Avenue on Staten Island as "Johnny Maestro Way".

On May 9, 2012, Johnny Maestro was honored by the United States House of Representatives. Congressman Jerrold Nadler of New York, whose district includes the neighborhood where Maestro was born and where he began his music career, introduced an Extension of Remarks in the House. This posthumous honor is now a permanent part of the Congressional Record. The Extension of Remarks includes the original members of The Crests.

== Discography ==
=== The Crests' singles ===
Title	Year	Peak chart positions		Record label	Notes
Title	Year	US Hot 100	US R&B	Record label	Notes
A: "Sweetest One" B: "My Juanita"	1957	86	—	Joyce	Recorded in early 1957 Recorded in early 1957
A: "No One To Love" B: "Wish She Was Mine"	1957	—	—	Joyce	Recorded on May 22, 1957, Recorded on May 22, 1957
A: "Pretty Little Angel" B: "I Thank The Moon"	1958	—	—	Coed	Recorded on June 25, 1958, Recorded on June 25, 1958
A: "16 Candles" (originally the B-side) B: "Beside You"	1958	2	4	Coed	Recorded on August 12, 1958, Recorded on June 25, 1958
A: "Six Nights A Week" B: "I Do"	1959	28	17	Coed	Recorded on January 14, 1959, Recorded on January 14, 1959
A: "Flower Of Love" B: "Molly Mae"	1959	79	—	Coed	Recorded on January 14, 1959, Recorded on August 12, 1958
A: "The Angels Listened In" B: "I Thank The Moon"	1959	22	14	Coed	Recorded on March 24, 1959, Recorded on June 25, 1958
A: "A Year Ago Tonight" B: "Paper Crown"	1959	42	—	Coed	Recorded on October 11, 1959, Recorded on October 11, 1959
A: "Step By Step" B: "Gee (But I'd Give The World)"	1960	14	—	Coed	Recorded on January 18, 1960, Recorded on January 18, 1960
A: "Trouble In Paradise" B: "Always You"	1960	20	—	Coed	Recorded on May 4, 1960, Recorded on May 4, 1960
A: "Journey Of Love" B: "If My Heart Could Write A Letter"	1960	81	—	Coed	Recorded on January 18, 1960, Recorded on May 4, 1960
A: "Isn't It Amazing" B: "Molly Mae"	1960	100	—	Coed	Recorded on May 4, 1960, Recorded on August 12, 1958
A: "I'll Remember (In The Still Of The Night)" B: "Good Golly Miss Molly"	1960	—	—	Coed	Recorded on March 24, 1959
A: "Say It Isn't So" B: "The Great Physician"	1960	—	—	Coed	Recorded on January 18, 1960, Recorded on January 18, 1960
A: "Model Girl" B: "We've Got To Tell Them"	1961	20	—	Coed	Recorded on December 29, 1960, Recorded on December 29, 1960
A: "What A Surprise" B: "The Warning Voice"	1961	33	—	Coed	Recorded on December 19, 1960, Recorded on December 29, 1960
A: "Little Miracles" B: "Baby I Gotta' Know"	1961	—	—	Coed	Recorded late 1961, released December 1961; Tony Middleton singing lead
A: "The Actor" B: "Three Tears In A Bucket"	1962	—	—	Trans Atlas	James Ancrum singing lead
A: "Guilty" B: "Number One With Me"	1962	—	—	Selma	James Ancrum singing lead
A: "Did I Remember" B: "Tears Will Fall"	1963	—	—	Selma	James Ancrum singing lead
A: "A Love To Last A Lifetime" B: "You Blew Out The Candles"	1964	—	—	Coral	James Ancrum singing lead

=== The Brooklyn Bridge discography ===
(See full discography at The Brooklyn Bridge discography)

Selected singles

- "Worst That Could Happen" (1968)
- "Welcome Me Love" (1969)
- "You'll Never Walk Alone" (1969)

Selected albums

- "Brooklyn Bridge" (1968)
- "The Second Brooklyn Bridge" (1969)
- "The Bridge in Blue" (1972)
- "For Collectors Only" (1992)
- "Johnny Maestro and The Brooklyn Bridge" (1993)
