= The Brooklyn Bridge discography =

A discography for the band the Brooklyn Bridge.

== Studio albums ==
Year	Album	Peak positions	
Year	Album	US 200	US CB
1968	Brooklyn Bridge	54	40
1969	The Second Brooklyn Bridge	145	—
1970	The Brooklyn Bridge	—	—
1971	The Bridge in Blue (as The Bridge)	—	—

Johnny Maestro & The Brooklyn Bridge

- 1989 Christmas Is... (EP)
- 1993 Johnny Maestro and The Brooklyn Bridge
- 1994 Acappella
- 2002 Peace on Earth
- 2004 Today
- 2007 Songs of Inspiration (reissue of Peace on Earth)
- 2009 Today, Volume 2

== Live albums ==
Year	Album	Peak positions
Year	Album	US 200
1969	Live at Yankee Stadium	169
2008	Johnny Maestro & The Brooklyn Bridge; ~Greatest Hits Live	145

== Compilations ==
- 1971 The Johnny Maestro Story
- 1981 Johnny Maestro sings his biggest hits with the Crests and the Brooklyn Bridge
- 1981 Johnny Maestro~History Of A Legend
- 1992 The Greatest Hits of Johnny Maestro & The Brooklyn Bridge
- 1992 Johnny Maestro & The Brooklyn Bridge~For Collectors Only
- 2006 The Best Of Johnny Maestro (1958-1985)
- 2010 The Solo Sides and More... Johnny Maestro ~ Maestro Music Please

== Videos ==
- 2005: "Pop Legends Live"
- 2012: "An Intimate Evening With Johnny Maestro & The Brooklyn Bridge ~ 40th Anniversary Edition"

== Other album & film appearances ==
- 1970: "It's Your Thing" (concert)(VHS) Performers
- 1972: "The Daredevil" (movie)(VHS) Performers (as themselves)
- 1975: "20 Years of Rock & Roll" (concert)(DVD) Performers
- 1979: "Hair" (DVD) Johnny Maestro, Jim Rosica, Fred Ferrara—singers in "The Black Boys" musical scene
- 1988: "Shake, Rattle & Roll" (concert)(DVD) Performers
- 1990: "The Greatest Rock n' Roll Hits of the 50s and 60s" (concert)(DVD) Performers
- 1999: "Doo Wop 50" PBS(TV)(DVD) Performers
- 2005: "Doo Wop Vocal Group Greats Live" PBS(TV)(DVD) Performers (Johnny Maestro served as co-host)
- 2010: "Johnny Maestro Video Collection" (DVD) Performances by Johnny Maestro and The Brooklyn Bridge on TV shows and telethons

== Singles ==
Year	Single	Peak positions		
Year	Single	US BB	US CB	CAN RPM
1968	"Worst That Could Happen"	3	4	4
1969	"Blessed Is the Rain"/	45	40	48
1969	"Welcome Me Love"	48	47	38
1969	"Your Husband, My Wife"	46	41	—
1969	"You'll Never Walk Alone"	51	37	—
1970	"Down By the River"	91	—	—
1970	"Free As the Wind"	109	67	—
1970	"Day Is Done"	98	89	—
1989	"Christmas Serenade"	—	—	—
