= George Paxton =

American musician, record producer

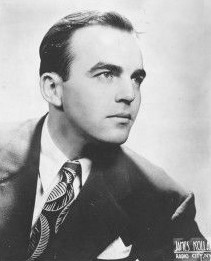

Background information
- Born: March 24, 1914; Indian River, Florida
- Died: April 19, 1989 (aged 75)
- Genres: Jazz
- Occupation: Musician
- Instrument: Saxophone
- Years active: 1930–1960s
- Label: Coed

George Paxton (March 24, 1914 – April 19, 1989) was an American big band leader, saxophonist, arranger, and publisher during the 1930s and 1940s. He was president of Coed Records and a producer for the label.

== Early career ==
He was born in Jacksonville, Florida, and grew up in Kearny, New Jersey, where he learned to play the saxophone at a young age and was influenced by the music of Isham Jones, later attending the Juilliard School. In 1933, while still in high school, Paxton formed a six-man band with schoolmates Tony Mottola and Herbie Haymer. The three later moved to New York City, where Paxton was hired to write arrangements for band leader and Meadowbrook Inn owner Frank Dailey. In the late 1930s, Paxton got a job with George Hall's Orchestra as an arranger and tenor sax player. Paxton was able to convince Hall to hire his high school friend and skilled guitar player Tony Mottola for the group. In Hall's group, Paxton got to work with other talented young musicians like Johnny Guarnieri on piano and Nick Fatool on drums. At this time, Paxton was also writing arrangements for Dolly Dawn and Her Dawn Patrol. In the early 1940s, Paxton arranged music for Bunny Berigan, Bea Wain, Charlie Spivak (along with Sonny Burke and Nelson Riddle), Ina Ray Hutton, Vaughn Monroe, and Sammy Kaye.

== George Paxton and His Orchestra ==
After years of playing, arranging, and directing different groups around New York City, Paxton formed his own orchestra in 1944. The group became popular in New York City, and a ten-week engagement at the Roseland Ballroom turned into a one year run. Some of these performances were broadcast live on the radio, which helped gain the band some popularity. George Paxton and His Orchestra toured the East Coast of the United States and gained some acclaim by 1945. Vocalists included Alan Dale, Liza Morrow, Dick Merrick, and Gene Williams. Standout musicians were trumpeter Guy Key (sometimes "Kee") and saxophonist Boomie Richman (sometimes "Richmond"), as well as Andrew Ackers (piano), Romeo Penque (sax), Max Herman (trumpet), Vern Whitney (trombone), Doc Goldberg (bass), Nick Fatool (drums), and others. The orchestra's primary label was Majestic, however their songs were also released on the Guild, Hit, and MGM labels. Some of Paxton's compositions and arrangements include: "Paxonia", "All of Me", "Streamliner", "This Can't Be Love", "I'm Coming Virginia", "Jug Night", and "I'm Gonna See My Baby", among others.

== George Paxton, Inc. ==
In 1949, Paxton was offered the job directing the house orchestra at The Capitol Theater in New York City. While there, he started a music publishing company; George Paxton, Inc. One of his first publications was "There's No Tomorrow", which became a big hit for Tony Martin.

== Coed Records ==
George Paxton and Marvin Cane formed Coed Records, Inc. in New York City in 1958, and had offices at 1619 Broadway in the Brill Building. Paxton produced many of the songs on this label, most of which were of the East Coast Doo-wop group style, and some of these became hit songs of the day. Between 1958 and 1965, Coed's biggest acts included the Crests, the Rivieras, the Duprees, the Harptones, and Adam Wade, among others. Paxton's big-band background came in particularly handy with the Duprees, who combined group vocals with deliberately nostalgic swing orchestra backing on hits like "You Belong to Me" and "Why Don't You Believe Me." Other highlights include the Crests' "Sixteen Candles" and three songs from the group's so-called "angel series," "The Angels Listened In," "Pretty Little Angel," and "Trouble in Paradise". In April 2010, the Coed Records catalogue was acquired by Los Angeles-based rights-management firm Beach Road Music, LLC.

As a credited songwriter for Coed Records, Paxton used the pseudonym "George Eddy" on songs including "The Writing on the Wall", a 1961 hit for Adam Wade which he co-wrote with Sandy Baron and Mark Barkan.

== Death ==
According to a Palm Beach Post news wire dated April 22, 1989, George Paxton died on April 19, 1989, "the victim of an apparent suicide".
