= The Johnny Maestro Story =

Compilation album by Johnny Maestro/The Brooklyn Bridge/The Crests
- Released: 1971
- Label: Buddah Records

The Brooklyn Bridge chronology
Brooklyn Bridge (1970)	The Johnny Maestro Story (1971)	The Bridge in Blue (1972)

Professional ratings
Review scores
Source	Rating
AllMusic	3/5 stars

The Johnny Maestro Story is a compilation of songs recorded by Johnny Maestro with The Crests and The Brooklyn Bridge.

== Track listing ==
The Crests

1. "16 Candles "
2. "Step By Step"
3. "Angels Listened In"
4. "Six Nights a Week"
5. "What a Surprise"

The Brooklyn Bridge

1. "Worst That Could Happen"
2. "Blessed is the Rain"
3. "Welcome Me Love"
4. "The Love's Still Growing"
5. "Wednesday in Your Garden"
6. "Your Husband, My Wife"
