= Tunesmith: The Songs of Jimmy Webb =

Compilation album by Jimmy Webb
- Released: November 4, 2003
- Genre: Popular music, country, folk, soul
- Length: 155:23
- Label: Raven Records

Professional ratings
Review scores
Source	Rating
AllMusic	4.5/5 stars

Tunesmith: The Songs of Jimmy Webb is a compilation album of songs written by Jimmy Webb and performed by various artists. Released in November 2003 by Raven Records, this two-disc compilation covers most of Webb's songwriting career, including some of his earliest recordings from the 1960s.

== Packaging ==
The two-disc compilation contains an insert with liner notes written by Glenn A. Baker.

== Track listing ==
Disc 1

1. "Love Years Coming" by Strawberry Children – 2:47
2. "I Keep On Keeping On" by the Contessas – 2:27
3. "Worst That Could Happen" by Brooklyn Bridge – 3:05
4. "How Sweet It Is" by The Picardy Singers – 2:36
5. "Up, Up and Away" by 5th Dimension – 2:37
6. "The Girls' Song" by Jackie DeShannon – 1:49
7. "Tunesmith" by Vicki Carr – 3:07
8. "Requiem: 820 Latham" by The Executives – 3:08
9. "Magic Garden" by Dusty Springfield – 2:24
10. "Galveston" by Glen Campbell – 2:38
11. "Just Another Piece of Paper" by Glen Campbell – 2:08
12. "Macarthur Park" by Richard Harris – 7:24
13. "If Ships Were Made to Sail" by Scott Walker – 2:36
14. "Where Does Brown Begin?" by Scott Walker – 4:34
15. "Song Seller" by Paul Revere & The Raiders – 3:32
16. "Clowns Exit Laughing" by The Fortunes – 3:11
17. "When It Was Done" by Hugo Montenegro – 3:43
18. "She Never Smiles Anymore" by The Mike Perjanik Complex – 3:09
19. "Do What You Gotta Do" by Four Tops – 4:02
20. "Honey Come Back" by Junior Walker & the All Stars – 4:19
21. "By the Time I Get to Phoenix" by Stevie Wonder – 4:21
22. "My Christmas Tree" by Temptations – 3:18
23. "Didn't We" by Dionne Warwick – 2:47
24. "Mixed-Up Girl" by Nancy Wilson – 2:30

Disc 2

1. "P.F. Sloan" by The Association – 4:01
2. "Wichita Lineman"/ "By the Time I Get to Phoenix" by King Harvest (see Leo de Castro) – 4:17
3. "All My Love's Laughter" by Jennifer Warnes – 3:23
4. "The Moon's a Harsh Mistress" by Judy Collins – 3:05
5. "Parenthesis" by Kerry Biddell – 2:51
6. "The Name of My Sorrow" by Mark Lindsay – 4:37
7. "The Old Man at the Fair" by Mark Lindsay – 3:37
8. "Met Her on a Plane" by Ian Matthews – 3:35
9. "All I Know" by Art Garfunkel – 2:25
10. "5:30 Plane" by The Supremes – 3:56
11. "Cheap Lovin'" by The Supremes – 4:19
12. "Everybody Gets to Go to the Moon" by The Three Degrees – 4:17
13. "She Moves, Eyes Follow" by Kenny Rankin – 3:59
14. "Oklahoma Nights" by Arlo Guthrie – 3:23
15. "Highwayman" by The Highwaymen – 3:02
16. "Himmler's Ring" by Lowell George – 2:30
17. "Lost Generation" by Onie J. Holy – 3:19
18. "The Last Unicorn" by Kenny Loggins – 3:43
19. "Where's the Playground Susie" by Everything but the Girl – 2:30
20. "Wichita Lineman" by R.E.M. – 3:15
21. "You Can't Treat the Wrong Man Right" by Linda Ronstadt – 3:31
22. "Adios" by Linda Ronstadt – 3:36

== Personnel ==
The following is an alphabetical list of the primary artists represented on this compilation.

- The 5th Dimension
- The Association
- Brooklyn Bridge
- Glen Campbell
- Vikki Carr
- Judy Collins
- Leo de Castro
- Jackie DeShannon
- Everything But the Girl
- The Executives
- Four Tops
- Art Garfunkel
- Lowell George
- Arlo Guthrie
- Richard Harris
- The Highwaymen
- King Harvest
- Mark Lindsay
- Kenny Loggins
- Ian Matthews
- Hugo Montenegro
- R.E.M.
- Kenny Rankin
- Paul Revere & the Raiders
- Linda Ronstadt
- Dusty Springfield
- Strawberry Children
- The Supremes
- The Temptations
- The Three Degrees
- Junior Walker & the All-Stars
- Scott Walker
- Jennifer Warnes
- Dionne Warwick
- Jimmy Webb
- Stevie Wonder
