= The Magic Garden =

Studio album by the 5th Dimension
- Released: December 1967
- Recorded: July 15 – November 1967
- Studios: United Western, Los Angeles
- Genres: Pop soul; psychedelia; orchestral pop
- Length: 35:29
- Label: Soul City Records
- Producer: Bones Howe

The 5th Dimension chronology
Up, Up and Away (1967)	The Magic Garden (1967)	Stoned Soul Picnic (1968)

Singles from The Magic Garden
- 1. "Paper Cup" Released: 1967; 2. "Carpet Man" Released: 1968; 3. "The Girls' Song" Released: 1970

Professional ratings
Review scores
Source	Rating
AllMusic	3/5 stars

The Magic Garden is the second album by the American pop group the 5th Dimension, released in 1967.

== Conception and composition ==
A concept album, The Magic Garden tells the story of a couple's love and the end of their relationship. In more recent discussions of the album, that love affair is said to be about Jimmy Webb — who composed all but one of the album's songs — and his time with singer and then-girlfriend Susan Horton (the song "Dreams/Pax/Nepenthe" refers to a Susan). The album's one track not credited to Jimmy Webb was a cover of Lennon–McCartney's "Ticket to Ride".

== Reception ==
Following the success of Up, Up and Away, which spawned two Top-20 singles on the Billboard Pop Chart, expectations were high for The Magic Garden, but the album just missed the Billboard Hot 100, and no Top 20 singles emerged from it in the US. The first single, "Paper Cup", rose only to #34. "Carpet Man", the album's second single, landed at #29 in the US but found great success in Canada, charting at #3 on Toronto's CHUM chart and #11 on the RPM chart, in March 1968. The group performed the song on Kraft Music Hall (on an episode hosted by John Davidson) and The Ed Sullivan Show.

However, over the years The Magic Garden has gained cult album status.

== The Worst That Could Happen ==
One of the album's cuts, "The Worst That Could Happen", was released as a single by the Brooklyn Bridge in December 1968, charting top 40 on Billboard in January and becoming a top 3 hit in the US. The 5th Dimension would have to wait for their next album, Stoned Soul Picnic, to achieve the same chart placement. To capitalize on the success of "The Worst That Could Happen", Soul City Records re-released The Magic Garden as The Worst That Could Happen. for the US market. The re-release reverses the front and back covers of the original LP. The vinyl label still retained The Magic Garden title, Soul City label and catalog number.

Although the original Magic Garden album was released in mono and stereo in both the US (SCM-91001) and UK (LBL 83098), the reissue as The Worst That Could Happen was released only in stereo (SCS-92001).

The album, retitled The Worst That Could Happen. The front cover is an image originally used on the back cover of The Magic Garden.

== Cultural impact ==
"Carpet Man" has been covered by the Nocturnes, the Charade, the Parking Lot, and by the founder of the 5th Dimension's Soul City record label, Johnny Rivers. Dusty Springfield recorded a cover of "The Magic Garden", which surfaced on a Springfield anthology in the 1990s.

== Track listing ==
All songs were written by Jimmy Webb, except where noted.

Side one

1. "Prologue" – 1:24
2. "The Magic Garden" – 2:48
3. "Summer's Daughter" – 3:03
4. "Dreams/Pax/Nepenthe" – 3:24
5. "Carpet Man" – 3:16
6. "Ticket to Ride" (John Lennon, Paul McCartney) – 4:00

Side two

1. "Requiem: 820 Latham" – 4:26
2. "The Girls' Song" – 4:09
3. "The Worst That Could Happen" – 2:37
4. "Orange Air" – 2:38
5. "Paper Cup" – 2:48
6. "Epilogue" – :56

== Personnel ==
- Billy Davis Jr. – lead vocals (track 9), background vocals
- Florence LaRue – lead vocals (tracks 5, 8), background vocals
- Marilyn McCoo – lead vocals (track 5, 8), background vocals
- Lamonte McLemore – background vocals
- Ron Townson – background vocals
- Jimmy Webb – orchestra conductor
- Dennis Budimir, Mike Deasy, Johnny Rivers, Tommy Tedesco – guitar
- Joe Osborn – bass guitar
- Hal Blaine – drums
- Larry Knechtel – keyboards

== Charts ==
=== Album ===
Weekly chart peaks for The Magic Garden
Chart (1968)	Peak position
US Billboard Top LP's	105
US Billboard Hot R&B LP's	43
US Cashbox Top 100 Albums	56

=== Singles ===
Year	Single	Chart	Peak position
1967	"Paper Cup"	Billboard; Hot 100	34
1968	"Carpet Man"	Billboard; Hot 100	29
1970	"The Girls' Song"	Billboard; Hot 100	43
