= The Writing on the Wall (Adam Wade song) =

Single by Adam Wade
- B-side: "Point of No Return"
- Released: May 1961
- Recorded: 1961
- Length: 2:27
- Label: Coed
- Songwriter(s): Mark Barkan; Sandy Baron; George Paxton

Adam Wade singles chronology
"Take Good Care of Her" (1961)	"The Writing on the Wall" (1961)	"Point of No Return" (1961)

"The Writing on the Wall" is a 1961 song which was a Top 5 Billboard Hot 100 single for Adam Wade. The song was co-written by Mark Barkan, Sandy Baron and George Paxton. Wade's B-side "Point Of No Return" also charted as #85 in Billboard.

== Covers ==
- Adam Wade - The Writing On The Wall / "Point Of No Return" - Coed - USA - CO 550
- Tommy Steele - The Writing On The Wall / Drunken Guitar - Decca - UK - F 11372
- Dale Harris - The Writing On The Wall / Night Life - Meremac - USA - 101 1966
- Gerd Böttcher, Decca, Germany, 7", Cat# D 19 229, 1961, Track A: Man geht so leicht am Glück vorbei (The Writing On The Wall)
