= Ruby (Ruby Gentry theme) =

Single by Ray Charles

from the album Dedicated to You
- B-side: "Hardhearted Hannah"
- Released: November 1960
- Recorded: August 23, 1960
- Studio: Bell Sound (New York City)
- Genre: Soul, traditional pop
- Length: 3:51
- Label: ABC-Paramount
- Composers: Mitchell Parish, Heinz Roemheld
- Producer: Sid Feller

Ray Charles singles chronology
"Georgia on My Mind" (1960)	"Ruby" (1960)	"Them That Got" (1961)

"Ruby" is the 1952 theme song for the film Ruby Gentry starring Jennifer Jones, written by Mitchell Parish and Heinz Roemheld. There were six charted versions of the song in 1953.

The theme enjoyed much popularity in orchestral recordings by Les Baxter, with harmonica solo by Danny Welton., Victor Young And His Singing Strings with George Fields on harmonica (Columbia DO-70040, Australia), Richard Hayman And His Orchestra with Richard Hayman on harmonica, and Jerry Murad and the Harmonicats.

== Notable recordings ==
It has subsequently become a jazz and pop standard, both as an instrumental and with lyrics by Mitchell Parish:

- Richard Hayman and His Orchestra. This reached No. 3 in the Billboard charts in 1953.
- Les Baxter and His Orchestra (harmonica solo by Danny Welton) had a hit with the song in 1953, peaking in the No. 7 position.
- Harry James and his Orchestra. A No. 20 hit in 1953.
- Victor Young and His Singing Strings. Reached number 20 in the charts in 1953.
- Vaughn Monroe and His Orchestra, reaching number 27 in the charts in 1953.
- Les Brown and His Band of Renown - briefly charted in 1953 at number 29.
- Ray Charles - reached No. 28 in the Billboard charts in 1960.
- Adam Wade accompanied by George Paxton & His Orchestra with The Bel-Aire Singers. This directly competed against the Ray Charles version and reached No. 58 in the charts in 1960. Wade's B-side was "Too Far" written by Pat Lambert and Bob Haymes.
