= Brooklyn Bridge (album) =

Studio album by The Brooklyn Bridge
- Released: December 1968
- Recorded: 1968
- Studio: Allegro Sound Studios, N.Y.C. and A&R Recording Studios, N.Y.C.
- Genre: Doo wop, R&B, pop, rock, blue-eyed soul
- Length: 31:22
- Label: Buddah
- Producer: Wes Farrell

The Brooklyn Bridge chronology
Brooklyn Bridge (1968)	The Second Brooklyn Bridge (1969)

Professional ratings
Review scores
Source	Rating
AllMusic	2/5 stars

Brooklyn Bridge is the debut album from the American band the Brooklyn Bridge. It was released in 1968 by Buddah Records.

== Track listing ==
1. "Blessed Is the Rain" (Tony Romeo) – 3:16
2. "Welcome Me Love" (Romeo) – 2:20
3. "Which Way to Nowhere" (Jimmy Webb) – 3:25
4. "Free as the Wind" (Sal Trimachi, Sandra Kane) – 2:39
5. "Glad She's a Woman" (Bodie Chandler) – (2:55)
6. "Space Odyssey-2001 (Thus Spake Zarathustra)" (Richard Strauss) – 1:20
7. "Requiem" (Webb) – 3:47
8. "I've Been Lonely Too Long" (Felix Cavaliere, Eddie Brigati) – 3:02
9. "The Worst That Could Happen" (Webb) – 3:02
10. "Piece of My Heart" (Bert Berns, Jerry Ragovoy) – 3:05
11. "Your Kite, My Kite" (Romeo) – 3:32

== Personnel ==
=== Brooklyn Bridge ===
- Johnny Maestro – lead vocals
- Richie Macioce – guitar
- Jimmy Rosica – bass guitar
- Carolyn Wood – organ
- Artie Cantanzarita – drums
- Joe Ruvio – saxophone
- Shelly Davis – trumpet, piano
- Fred Ferrara, Les Cauchi, Mike Gregorio – vocals

=== Technical ===
- Wes Farrell – producer
- Harry Yarmark, Roy Cicala – engineers
- Tommy Sullivan – saxophone arrangements
- Acy R. Lehman – art direction
- Mark English – cover art
- Silver & Morris, Inc. – cover
- Neil Bogart – liner notes
