= If It's Tuesday, This Must Be Belgium =

1969 romantic comedy film directed by Mel Stuart

- Original film poster
- Directed by: Mel Stuart
- Written by: David Shaw
- Produced by: Stan Margulies
- Starring: Suzanne Pleshette; Ian McShane; Mildred Natwick; Murray Hamilton; Michael Constantine; Norman Fell; Sandy Baron
- Cinematography: Vilis Lapenieks
- Edited by: David Saxon
- Music by: Walter Scharf
- Production companies: Wolper Pictures, Ltd.
- Distributed by: United Artists
- Release date: April 24, 1969
- Running time: 99 min
- Country: United States
- Language: English
- Box office: $6 million

If It's Tuesday, This Must Be Belgium is a 1969 American romantic comedy film made by Wolper Pictures and released by United Artists and made in DeLuxe Color. Directed by Mel Stuart, the movie was filmed on location throughout Europe, and featured cameo appearances. The film stars Suzanne Pleshette, Ian McShane, Mildred Natwick, Murray Hamilton, Sandy Baron, Michael Constantine, Norman Fell, Peggy Cass, Marty Ingels, Pamela Britton, and Reva Rose.

== Plot ==
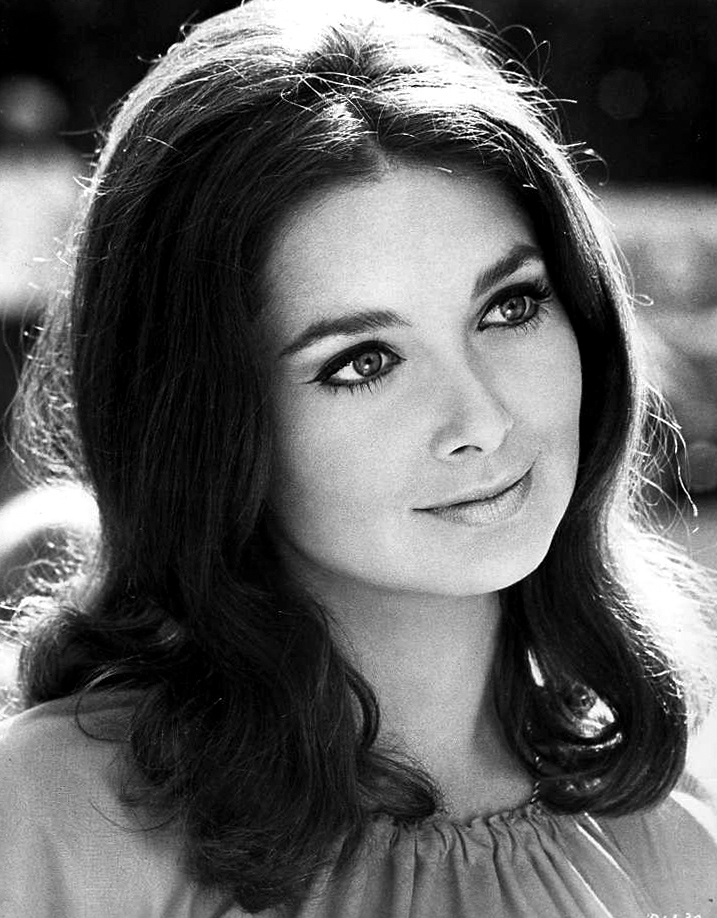
Suzanne Pleshette plays Samantha Perkins, on vacation to contemplate whether to marry her fiancé, who resists Charlie’s seductive charm, reluctant to become another conquest.

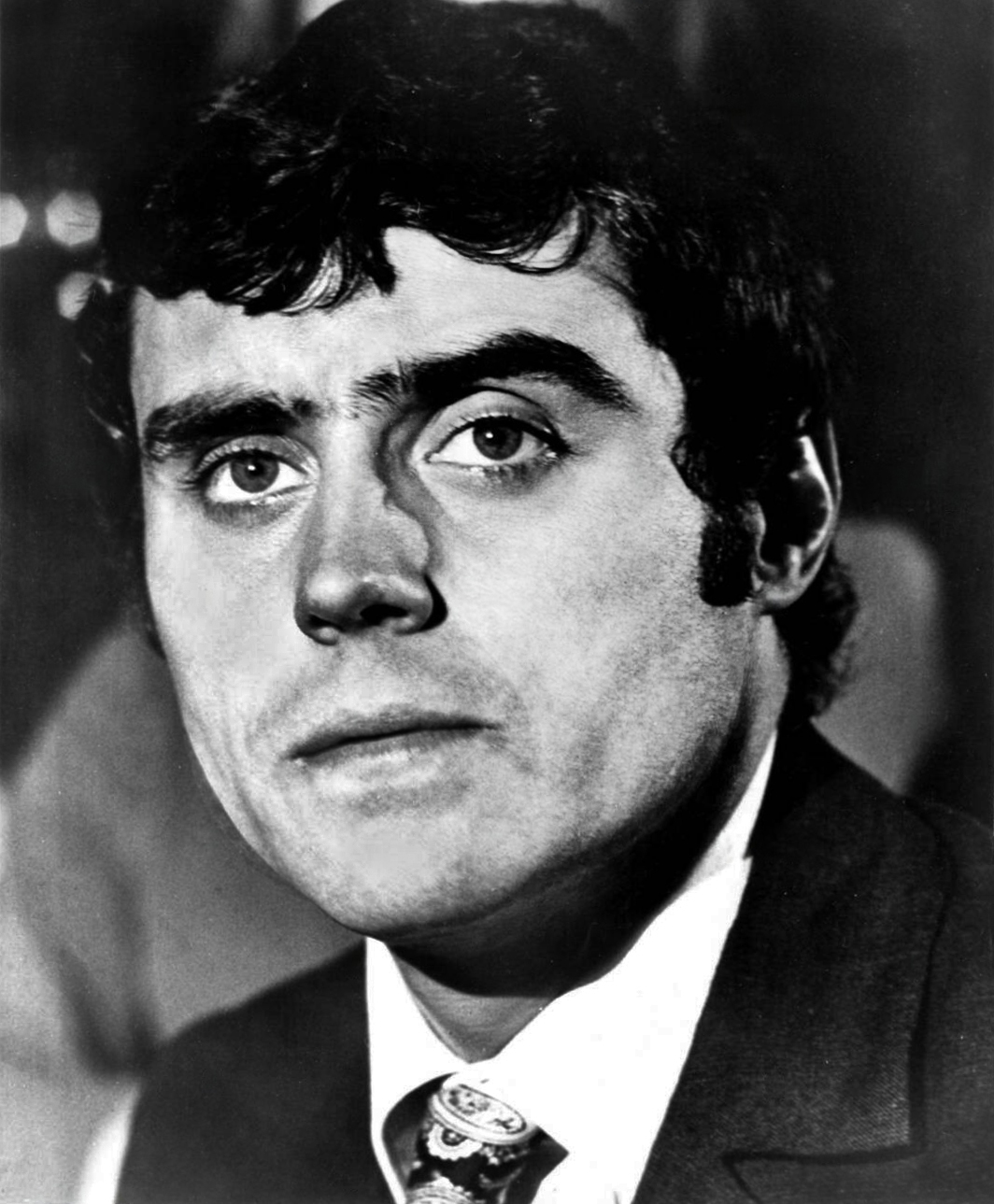
Ian McShane plays Charlie Cartwright, an amorous English tour guide, who takes groups of Americans on whirlwind 9-countries-in-18-days sightseeing tours.

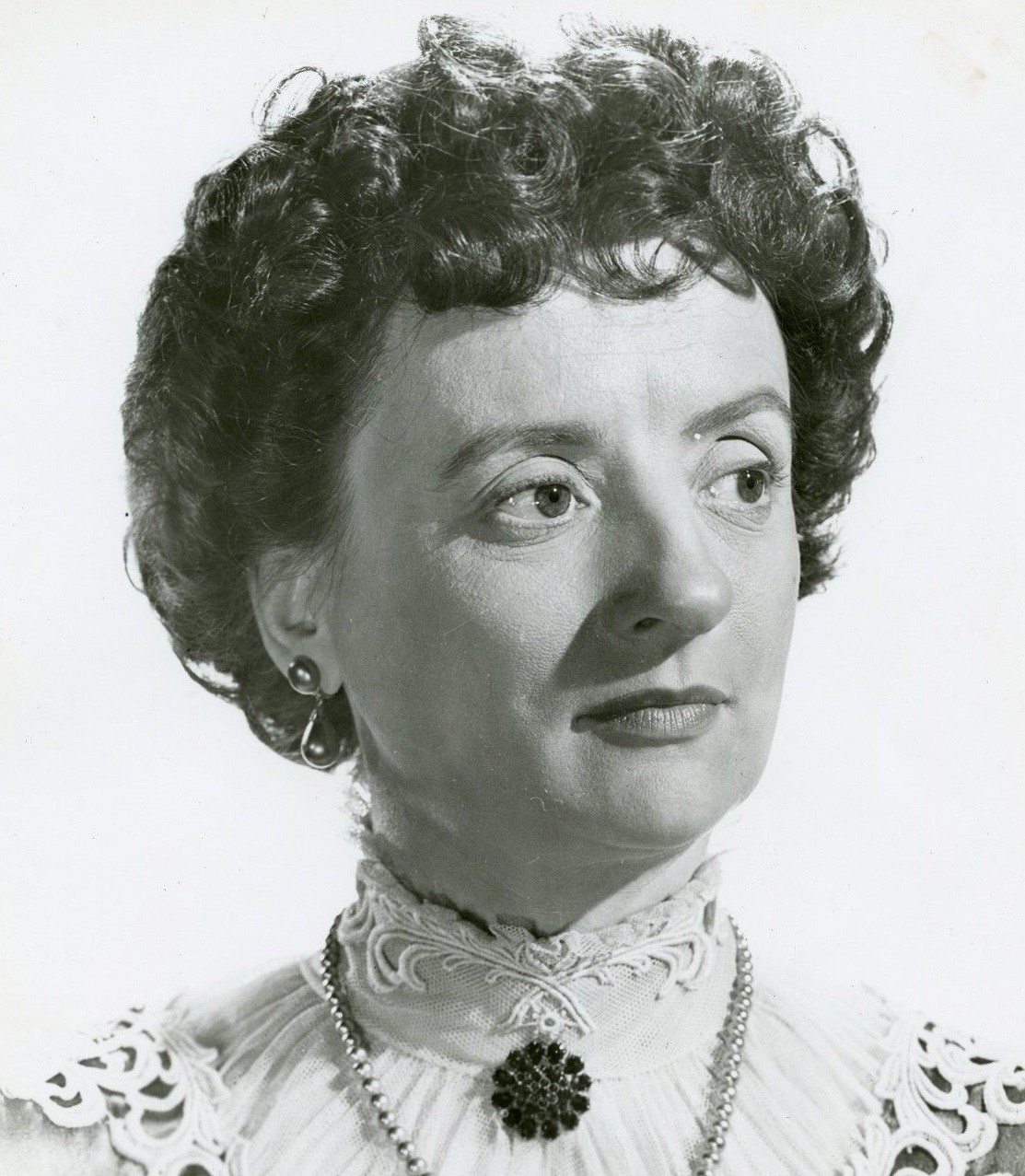
Mildred Natwick plays Jenny Grant, a middle-aged American tourist.

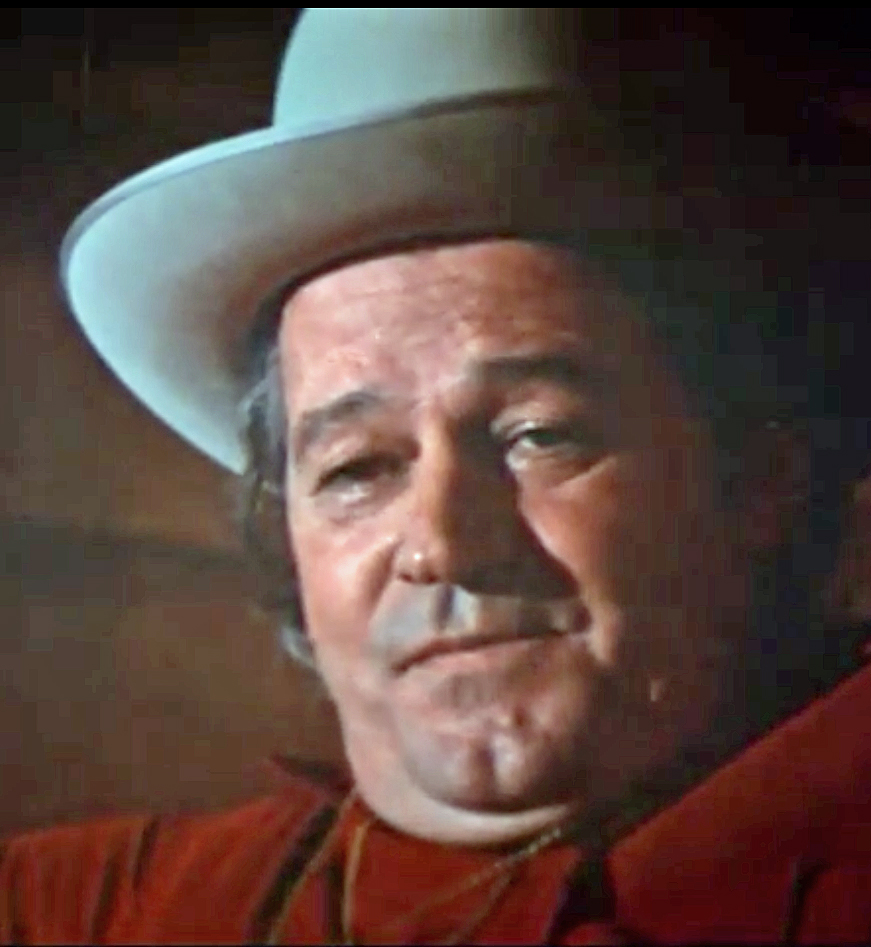
Murray Hamilton plays Fred Ferguson, who constantly complains to his wife Edna that the tour is an ordeal and he is eager to get home.

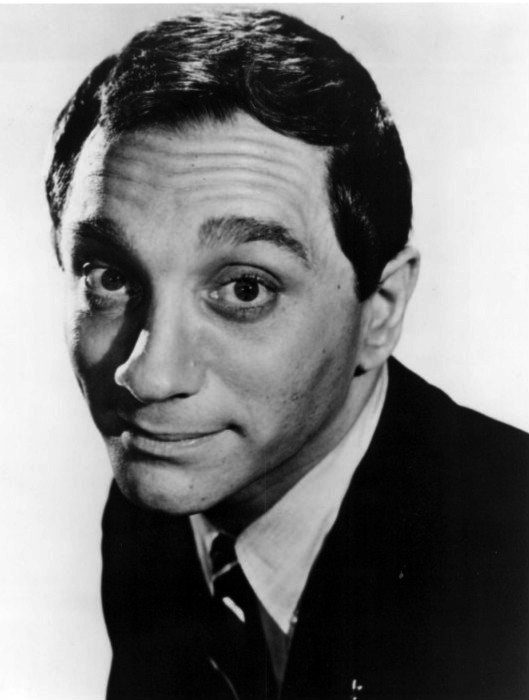
Sandy Baron plays John Marino, who jumps out of a Venetian window into a canal when distant relatives want to fix him up with a plump, plain cousin.

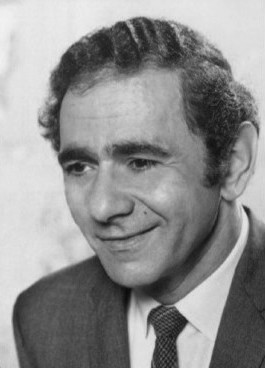
Michael Constantine plays Jack Harmon, revisiting World War II sites where he fought, whose fantasies are shattered when he finds his still attractive old flame now a grandmother with a family.

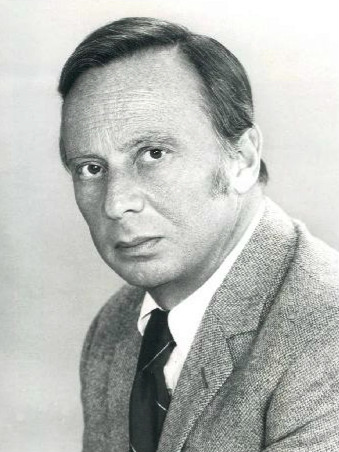
Norman Fell plays as Harve Blakely, whose wife, Irma Blakely, disappears on a Japanese tour bus she mistakenly boards when separated from her group.

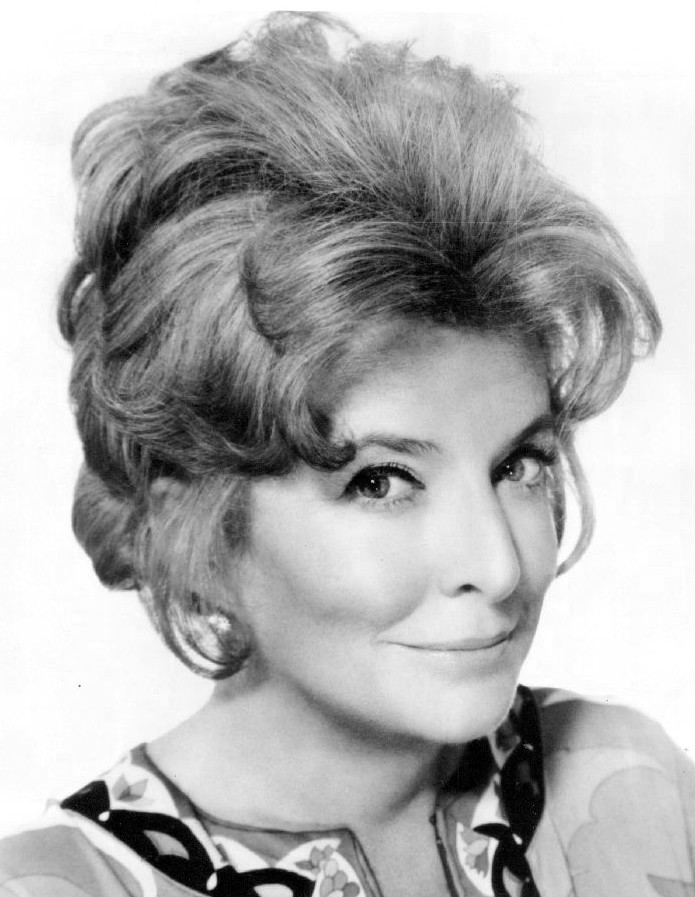
Peggy Cass plays Edna Ferguson, who, along with her husband, takes her daughter Shelly on the trip to separate her from an undesirable boyfriend.

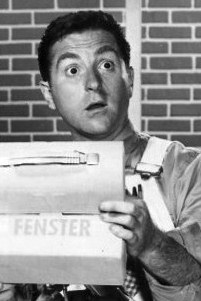
Marty Ingels plays Bert Greenfield, who sneaks pictures of intimate angles of voluptuous women, pretending to buddies back home that he is “scoring” with them.

Charlie Cartwright, an amorous English tour guide, takes groups of Americans on whirlwind nine-countries-in-18-days sightseeing tours of Europe. Having overslept with his newest conquest, he is late meeting tour #225, finding a resentful group eager to start.

Samantha Perkins, one of those tourists, is on vacation to contemplate whether to marry her fiancé, George. In London, Charlie begins a campaign to charm and seduce the gorgeous Samantha, who considers him frivolous and conniving, reluctant to become just another conquest. Despite verbal sparring, they become mutually attracted, and the confirmed bachelor Charlie proposes marriage. Samantha ultimately decides to settle for neither the unexciting George, who turns up unexpectedly, nor the charismatic Charlie, who is unsuitable husband material.

Fred and Edna Ferguson take their daughter Shelly on the trip to separate her from an undesirable boyfriend with whom she is getting sexually involved. In Amsterdam, Shelly meets an activist American college student who follows her around different tour locations, where they sneak off on his motorcycle to spend time together sightseeing through counterculture eyes.

Also in Amsterdam, Irma Blakely disappears on a Japanese tour bus she mistakenly boards when separated from her group. Multiple attempts must be made before the two tours overlap to restore her to her husband, Harve. Although Harve pines for Irma during the whole trip and must be coaxed into joining the group at a nightclub, when Irma finally reappears in Rome, she finds him onstage dancing with burlesque dancers and mistakenly believes he has been partying in her absence. Irma declares they will go to Japan next year, since she has made many friends on her improvised tour.

In Belgium, Jack Harmon revisits the World War II site where he fought in Bastogne. As he tells tall tales to a fellow tourist, Freda Gooding, of a German retreat, he literally crosses path with a German veteran who is acting out a contradictory tale of Allied retreat to his wife. In Rome, eager to see Gina, a woman he met during the war, again, Jack's fantasies are shattered when he finds that, while still attractive, she is now a grandmother with a family. In consolation, he turns to Freda Gooding, a widow, and begins to get to know her.

Often getting slapped, Bert Greenfield sneaks pictures of breasts, thighs, and other intimate angles of voluptuous women, pretending that he is "scoring" with them, and sending made-up stories to his buddies. Desperate, he pays a pretty girl to pose with him in an embrace; she returns his money out of pity and kisses his cheek before departing.

In Italy, John Marino takes time from the tour to meet his relatives, who receive him warmly but alarm him when they want to fix him up with Francesca, a plump, plain cousin, who he jumps through a bathroom window into a canal to avoid. The next day he is handed a pile of messages from “a cousin” and spends the rest of his time avoiding her. As he is leaving Venice, John finds that he has been dodging a different―beautiful―cousin he laments not getting to know; Bert laments not getting her photo for his collection.

Throughout the tour, Fred complains to Edna that the tour is an ordeal and he is eager to get home. His one objective is to have a custom pair of Italian shoes made, for which he goes through an arduous process to make the non-English-speaking shoemaker understand his specifications. After Fred leaves, the shoemaker selects a pair of ready-made shoes from a catalogue, completely mistaking the specifications, that he will mail to the U.S. to fulfill the "special order". Despite having complained throughout the whole tour, Fred declares they will go on a tour of Scandinavia next year.

Throughout the tour, kleptomaniac Harry Dix steals "souvenirs" such as towels, ashtrays, Bibles, bells, lifesavers, telephones, and paintings from each location, which he stows into a commodious suitcase. At the airport on departure, his suitcase is so heavy that it collapses, spilling all his pilfered objects, which he leaves behind.

Starting tour #226, Charlie gives an introductory speech evoking unexpected adventure, reflecting his new romantic, less cynical, outlook, as the new group of tourists rotate seats and get to know each other.

== Cast ==
=== Main ===
- Suzanne Pleshette as Samantha Perkins
- Ian McShane as Charlie Cartwright
- Mildred Natwick as Jenny Grant
- Murray Hamilton as Fred Ferguson
- Sandy Baron as John Marino
- Michael Constantine as Jack Harmon
- Norman Fell as Harve Blakely
- Peggy Cass as Edna Ferguson
- Marty Ingels as Bert Greenfield
- Pamela Britton as Freda
- Reva Rose as Irma Blakely
- Aubrey Morris as Harry Dix
- Hilarie Thompson as Shelly Ferguson
- Luke Halpin as Bo
- Mario Carotenuto as Giuseppe
- Patricia Routledge as Mrs. Featherstone
- Marina Berti as Gina
- Ermelinda De Felice as Italian Woman in Automobile Accident (as Linda De Felice)
- Paul Esser as German Sergeant
- Jenny White as Dot

=== Cameo appearances ===
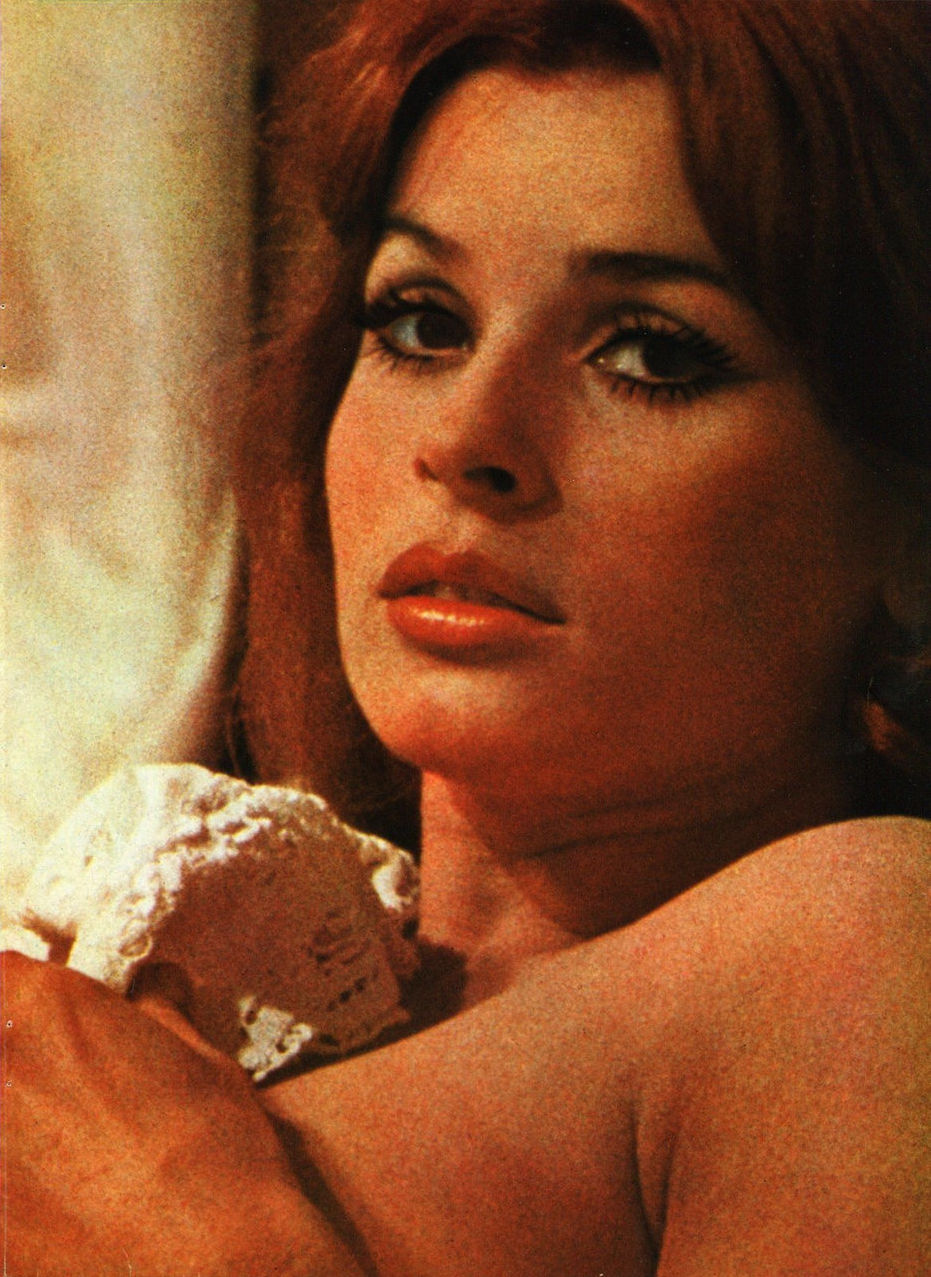
Senta Berger, Saleswoman in Carnaby Street boutique

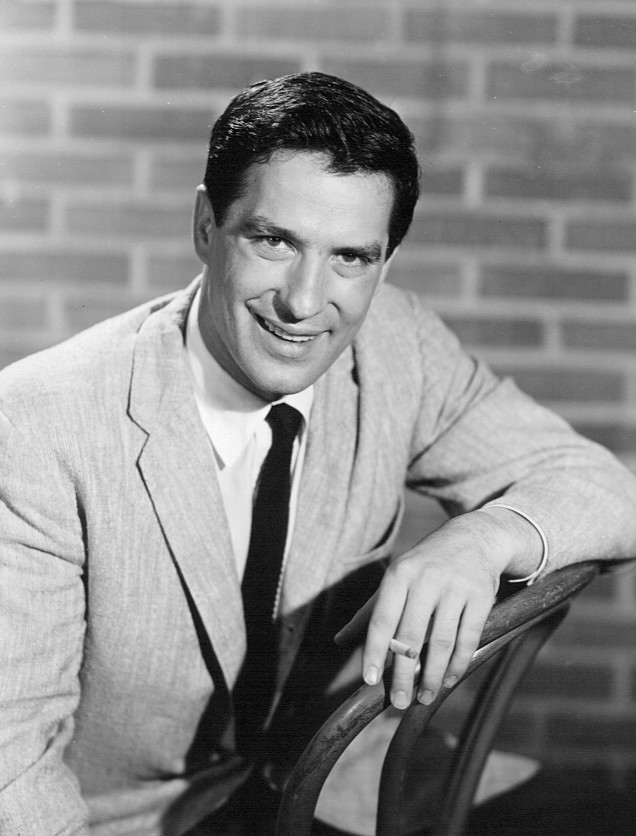
John Cassavetes, Bert's Poker buddy

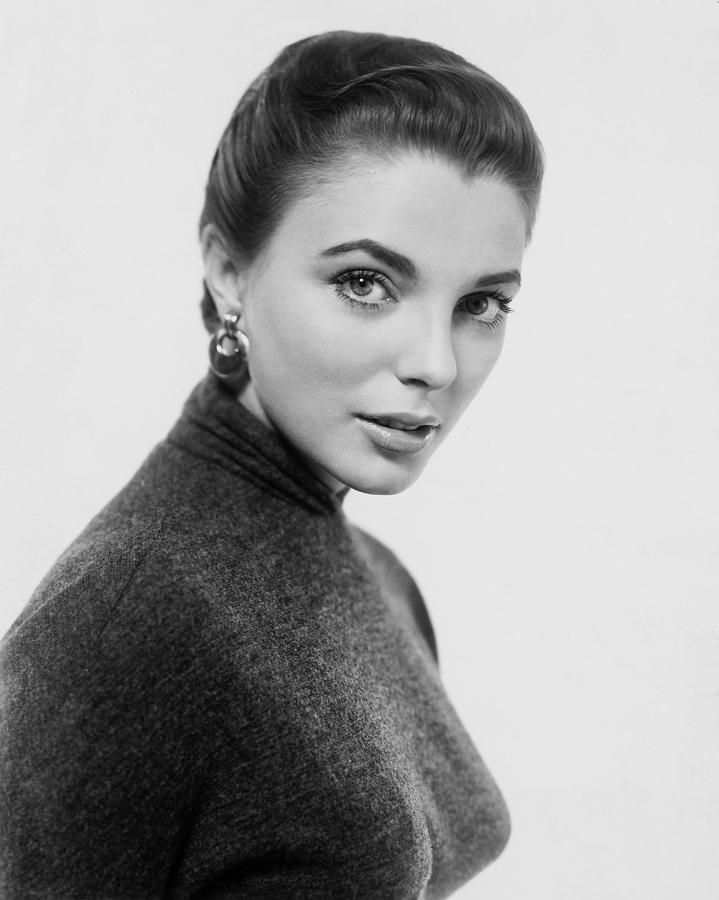
Joan Collins, Woman on London street

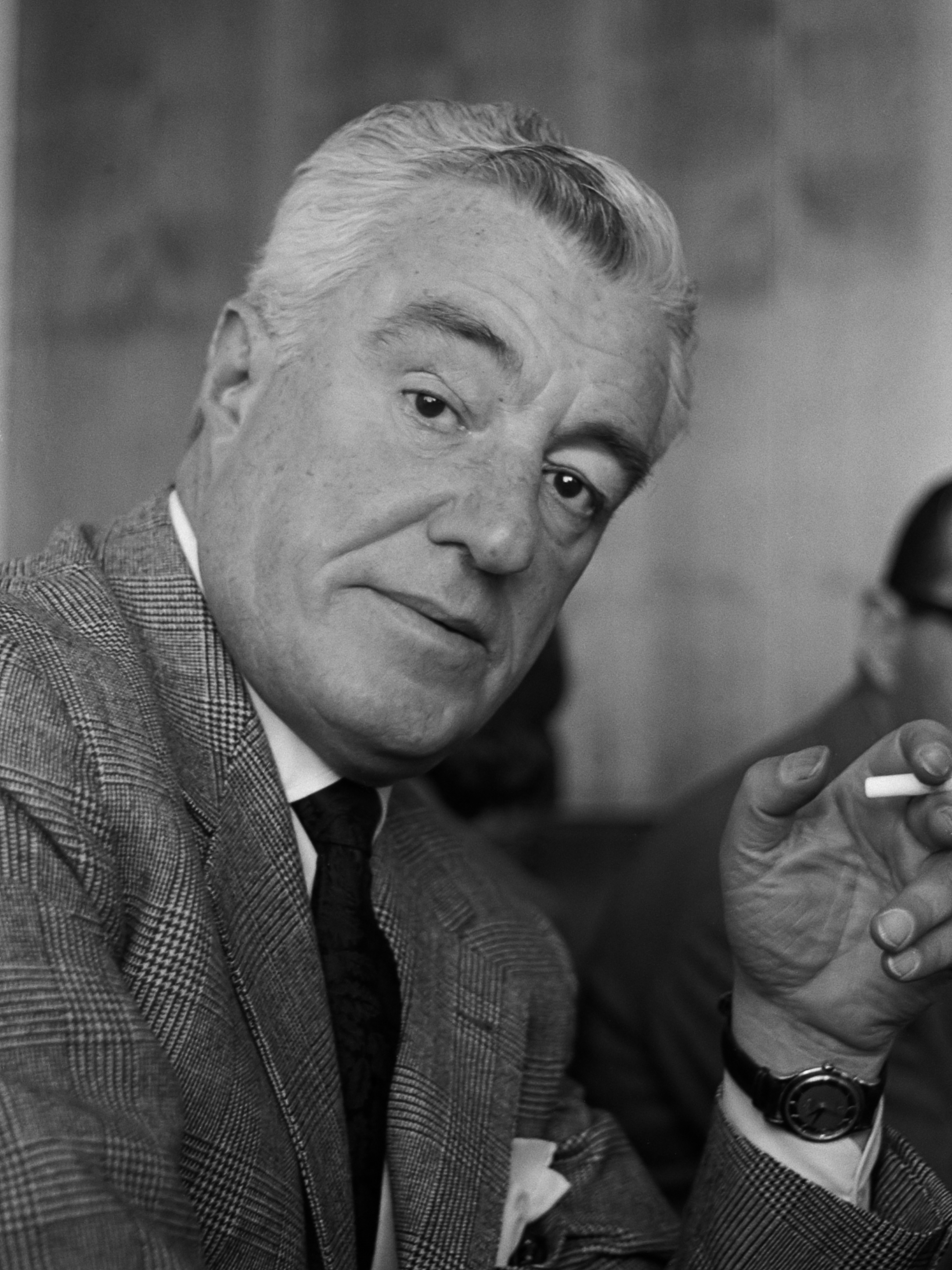
Vittorio De Sica, Roman shoemaker

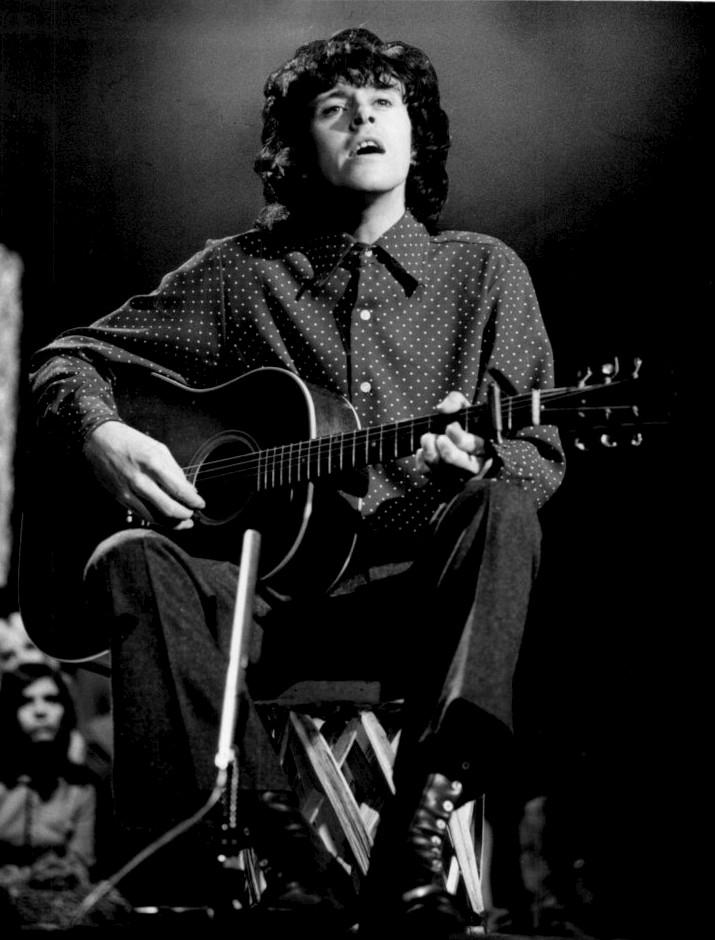
Donovan singing "Lord of the Reedy River"

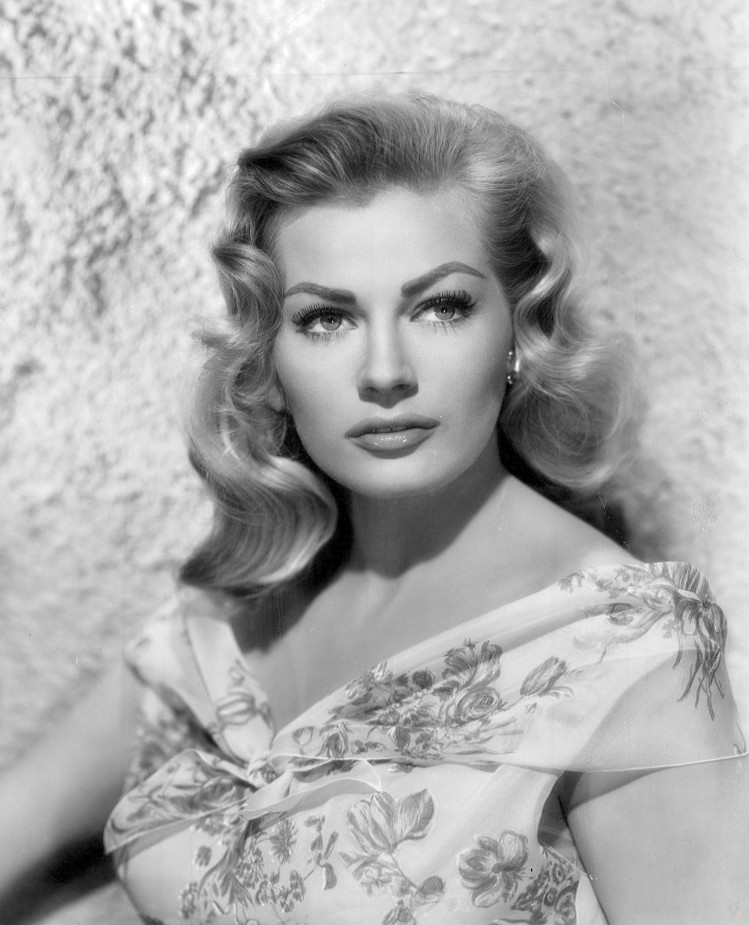
Anita Ekberg, Roman burlesque act emcee

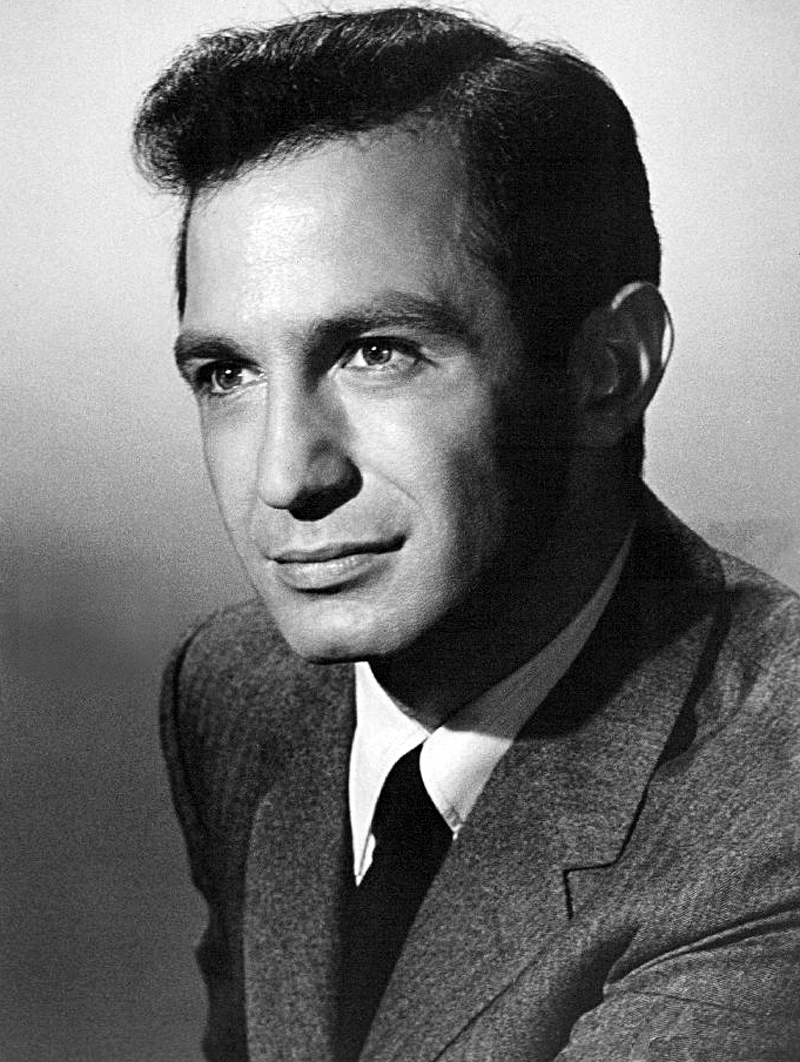
Ben Gazarra, Bert's Poker buddy

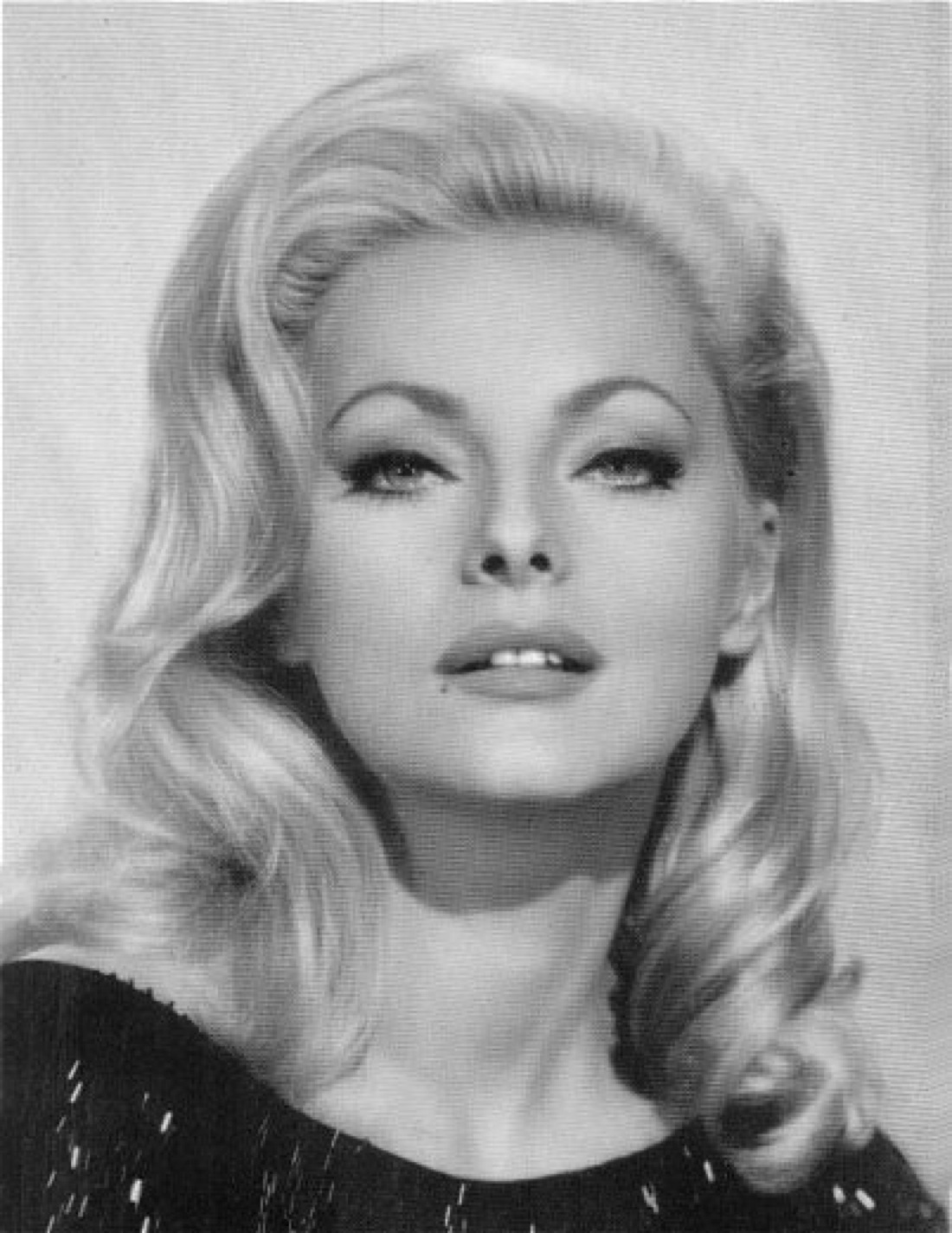
Virna Lisi, John's beautiful cousin whom he dodges

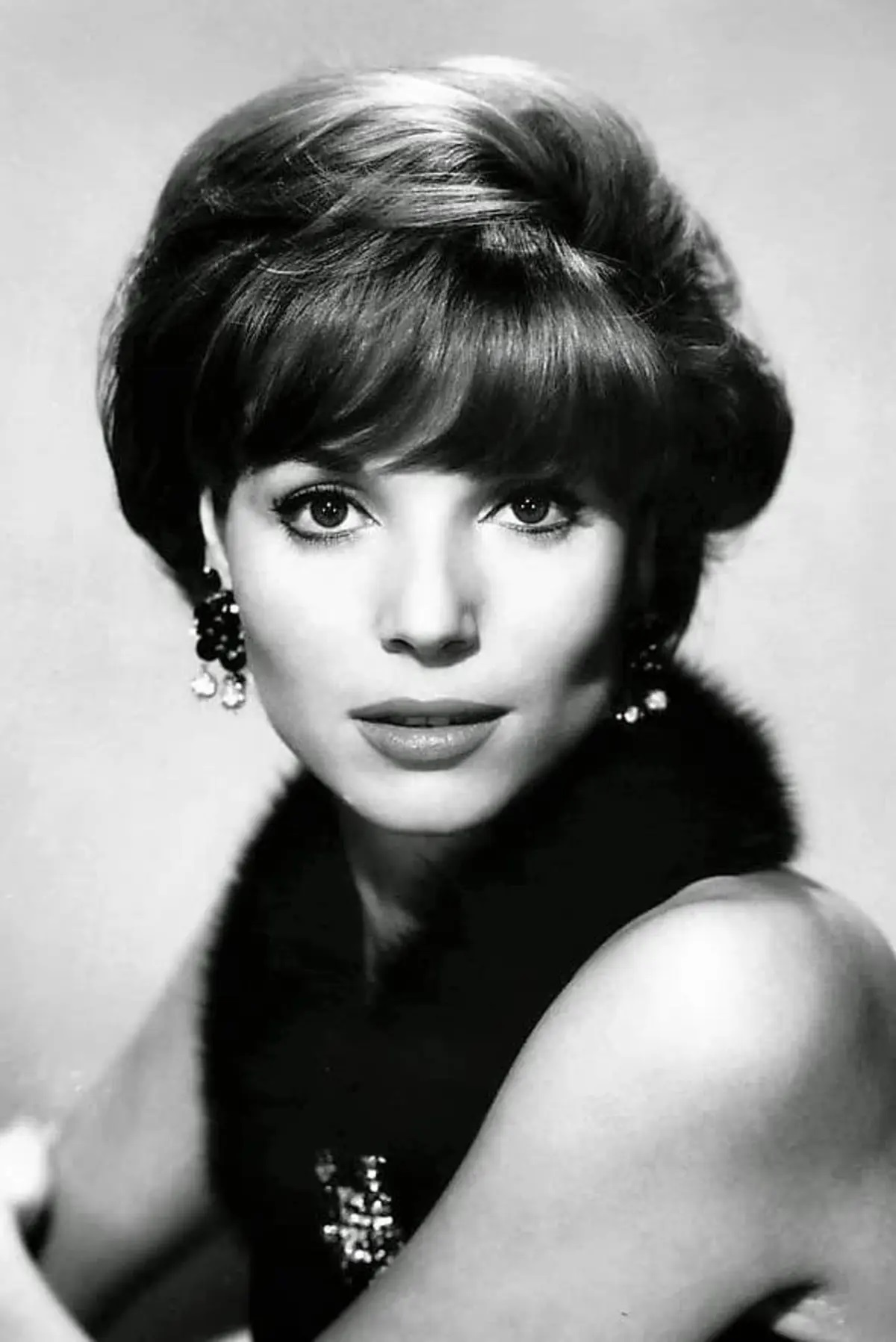
Elsa Martinelli, Charlie's Venetian girlfriend

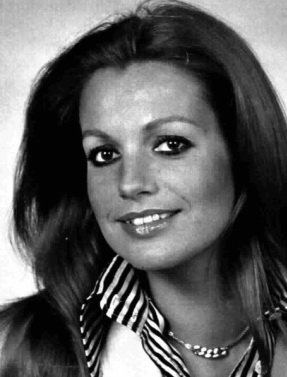
Catherine Spaak, Woman Bert pays for photo of embrace

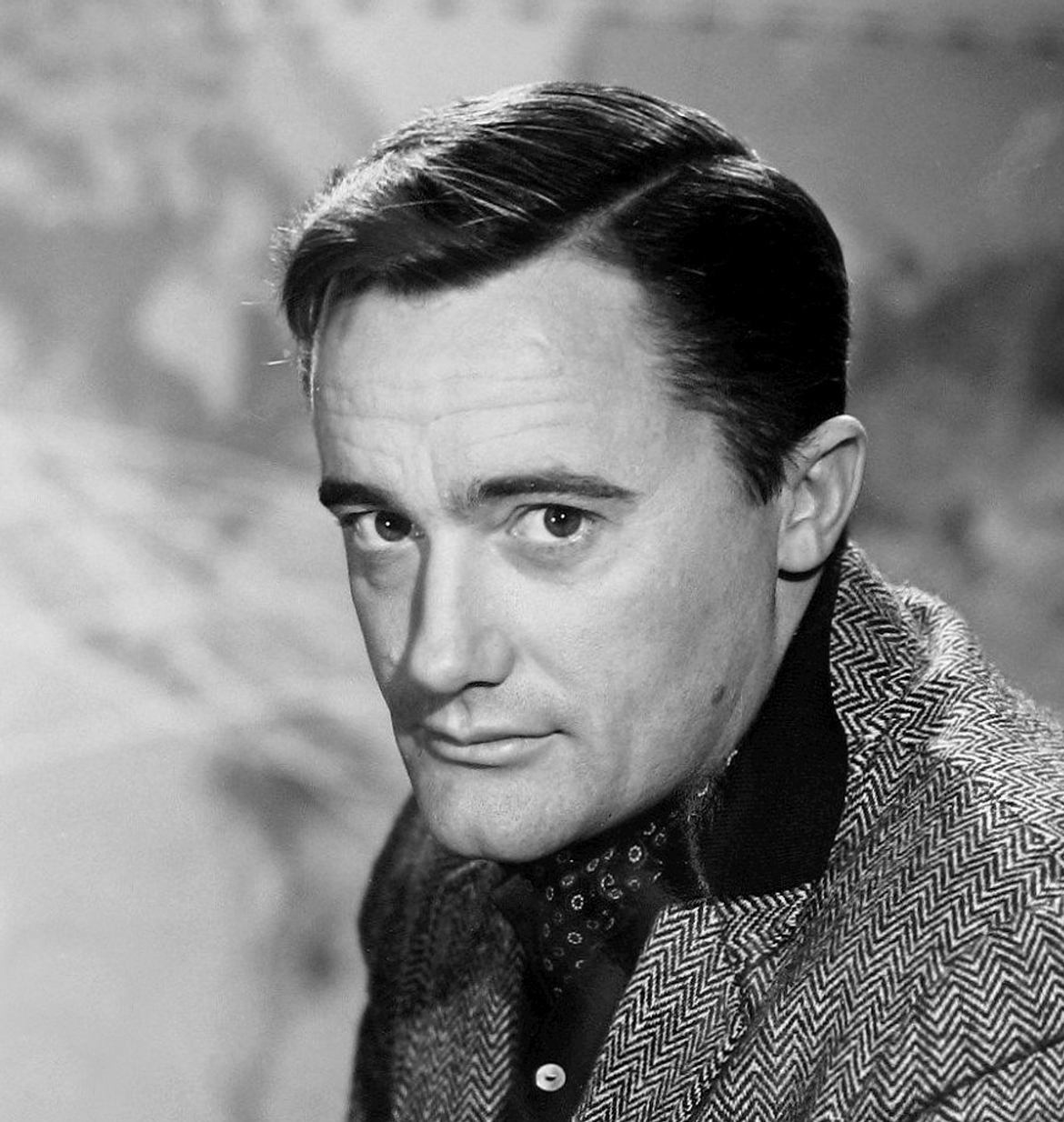
Robert Vaughn, Roman photographer

== Production ==
The title, also used by a 1965 documentary on CBS television that filmed one such tour, was taken from a New Yorker cartoon by Leonard Dove. Published in the June 22, 1957, issue of the magazine, the cartoon depicts a young woman near a tour bus and a campanile, frustratedly exclaiming, "But if it's Tuesday, it has to be Siena", humorously illustrating the whirlwind nature of European tour schedules. (Note: The idea had appeared earlier, in The Café de la Paix, a 1925 revue sketch by Noël Coward in On with the Dance, which includes an exchange between American tourists: Mrs Hammaker—"Are we in Paris or Brussels, Harry"? Harry—"What day of the week is it"? Irma—"Thursday". Harry—"We are in Paris".) This concept formed the premise of the film's plot. Donovan sings his composition "Lord of the Reedy River." He also wrote the film's title song, performed by J.P. Rags, a pseudonym for Douglas Cox.

=== Locations ===
The film was shot on location in London; the Netherlands; Brussels and Bastogne; Rhineland-Palatinate, with the boat on the Rhine from Koblenz to Wiesbaden; Switzerland; and Venice and Rome. The film poster shows the cast on the Grote Markt square of Antwerp, Belgium, posing for a typical souvenir photo in front of the city hall, with their tour bus obstructing the view of the Brabo fountain, another favored site for tourist photos.

== Reception ==
=== Box office ===
If It's Tuesday, This Must Be Belgium earned estimated rentals of $3 million in the United States during its initial run.

=== Critical response ===
Vincent Canby of The New York Times wrote in his review: "IF IT'S TUESDAY, This Must Be Belgium may be the first cartoon caption ever made into a feature-length movie. If I remember correctly, that was the legend that appeared some years ago under a New Yorker Magazine cartoon showing two harried American travelers, in the middle of a relentlessly picturesque village, consulting their tour schedule. It was a nice cartoon, made timely by the great wave of tourism that swept Europe in the 1950s. Subsequently, I'm told, there was a television documentary that explored more or less this same phenomenon—the boom in pre-paid (two in a room), packaged culture junkets. Now, some years after the subject seemed really fresh, a movie has been made about one such 18-day, 9-country excursion. Even if you don't accept the fact that just about everything that could be said about American tourism was said earlier by Mark Twain, Henry James or even Woody Allen, If It's Tuesday, This Must Be Belgium is a pretty dim movie experience, like a stopover in an airport where the only reading matter is yesterday's newspapers."

Roger Ebert wrote in his review: "Someone — Mark Twain? — once said that the American tourist believes English can be understood anywhere in the world if it's spoken loudly and slowly enough. To this basic item of folklore, other characteristics of the typical American tourist have been added from year to year: He wears sunglasses, Bermuda shorts and funny shirts. He has six cameras hanging around his neck. He orders hamburgers in secluded little Parisian restaurants. He talks loudly, and the female of his species is shrill and critical. He is, in short, a plague. This sort of American tourist does still exist, but in much smaller numbers. My observation during several visits to Europe is that the American tourist has become poorer and younger than he used to be, and awfully self-conscious about being an American. On the average, he's likely to be quieter and more tactful than the average German or French tourist (who doesn't have to prove anything). The interesting thing about If It's Tuesday, This Must Be Belgium is that it depicts this new American tourist. That's amazing because movies of this sort usually tend to be 10 years behind the times, and I went expecting another dose of the Bermuda shorts syndrome. If It's Tuesday isn't a great movie by any means, but it manages to be awfully pleasant. I enjoyed it more or less on the level I was intended to, as a low-key comedy presenting a busload of interesting actors who travel through England, Belgium, Germany, and Italy on one of those whirlwind tours. There is a lot of scenery, but not too much, and some good use of locations in Venice and Rome. There are also some scenes that are better than they should be because they're well-acted. Murray Hamilton is in a lot of these scenes, and they're reminders that he has been in a disproportionate number of the best recent comedies: The President's Analyst, Two for the Road, and The Graduate (he was Mr. Robinson)."

== Remake ==
If It's Tuesday, This Must Be Belgium was remade in 1987 as a made-for-TV movie titled If It's Tuesday, It Still Must Be Belgium, directed by Bob Sweeney. The film starred Claude Akins, Lou Liberatore, Courteney Cox, Bruce Weitz, Stephen Furst, Anna Maria Horsford, Kene Holliday, Kiel Martin, David Leisure, Doris Roberts, Tracy Nelson, Richard Moll, David Oliver, Lou Jacobi, and Peter Graves.

== Release ==
If It's Tuesday, This Must Be Belgium was released in theaters on April 24, 1969.

=== Home media ===
The film was released on DVD on May 20, 2008. Olive Films released a Blu-Ray edition in 2016.

== See also ==
- List of American films of 1969

== Sources ==
- Coward, Noël (1931). Collected Sketches and Lyrics. London: Hutchinson. OCLC 22370483.
