= The Girls' Song =

- French release picture sleeve

Single by The 5th Dimension

from the album Greatest Hits
- B-side: "It'll Never Be the Same Again"
- Released: March 1970
- Genre: Soul
- Length: 3:13
- Label: Soul City Records 781
- Songwriter(s): Jimmy Webb
- Producer(s): Bones Howe

The 5th Dimension singles chronology
"A Change Is Gonna Come/People Got to Be Free" (1970)	"The Girls' Song" (1970)	"Puppet Man" (1970)

"The Girls' Song" is a song written by Jimmy Webb and performed by The 5th Dimension. The song was produced by Bones Howe and arranged by Webb. It was featured on their 1967 album, The Magic Garden, but was not released as a single until its release from their 1970 album, Greatest Hits.

By Webb's own admission, this was his attempt to write a song that sounded like the work of Burt Bacharach. As Webb wrote upon Bacharach's death, "I learned about chords from listening to Burt’s songs on the radio. I tried to write like him (listen to my song 'The Girl’s Song' by The Fifth Dimension). He was integral to my informal songwriting education."

== Chart performance ==
It reached #6 on the U.S. adult contemporary chart, #43 on the Billboard Hot 100, and #97 in Australia in 1970.

== Other versions ==
- A version of the song by Jackie DeShannon was featured on the 2003 album, Tunesmith: The Songs of Jimmy Webb
- A version of the song by The Spencer Davis Group was featured on the 2016 album, Taking Out Time Complete Recordings 1967-1969
