= Sandy Baron =

American actor and comedian

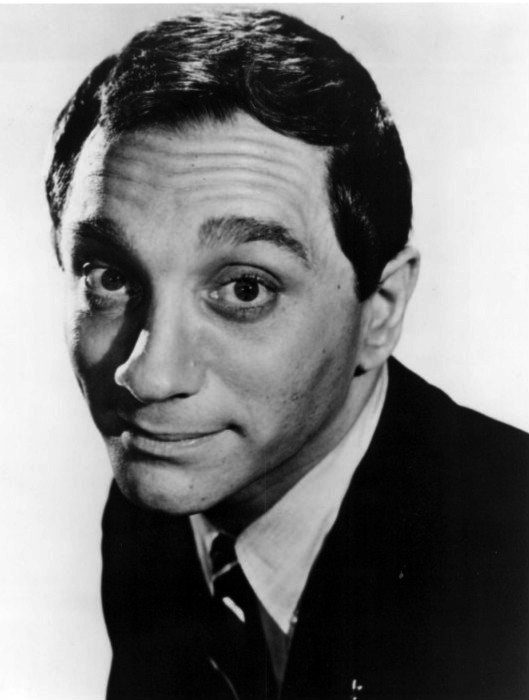
- Baron in 1968
- Born: Sanford Irving Beresofsky; May 5, 1936; Brooklyn, New York City, U.S.
- Died: January 21, 2001 (aged 64); Los Angeles, California, U.S.
- Resting place: Hillside Memorial Park Cemetery
- Occupation: Actor
- Years active: 1962–1998
- Spouses: Geraldine Mary Crotty (m. 1962; div. 1967) Mary Jo Webster (m. 1970; div. 1975) Stephanie Ericsson (m. 1976; div. 1981)

Sandy Baron (born Sanford Irving Beresofsky; May 5, 1936 – January 21, 2001) was an American actor and comedian who performed on stage, in films, and on television. He is best known for his recurring role of Jack Klompus on the NBC sitcom Seinfeld.

== Early life ==
Sanford Irving Beresofsky was born in Brooklyn, New York on May 5, 1936, and he grew up in the Brownsville neighborhood, the son of Helen Farberman, a waitress, and Max Beresofsky, a house painter, both Yiddish-speaking Russian Jewish immigrants. His father was born in Slonim, Belarus. He graduated from Thomas Jefferson High School in East New York; and while he was a student at Brooklyn College, to which he received a scholarship, he changed his name to "Sandy Baron"—taking his inspiration from the nearby Barron's Bookstore. He began his career working in the Catskill Mountains resorts with their "Borscht Belt" brand of Jewish humor, on which Baron made his mark. He then moved on to the Compass Players Improv Comedy group in the late 1950s.

== Career ==
Baron made his Broadway debut in Tchin-Tchin in 1962. He also appeared in many other Broadway plays, hits as well as flops, including Arturo Ui, Generations, and Lenny (Los Angeles production). He replaced Cliff Gorman in the lead role of Lenny Bruce on Broadway.

In 1964, he established a reputation as part of the weekly television program That Was The Week That Was, and as the opening act for Steve Lawrence and Eydie Gorme at the Copacabana in New York City. In the 1966–1967 season, Baron co-starred with Will Hutchins in the NBC sitcom Hey, Landlord, about a brownstone apartment in Manhattan. In the 1970s, he made regular appearances on talk shows such as The Mike Douglas Show and The Merv Griffin Show, and multiple guest appearances on The Tonight Show Starring Johnny Carson. Baron was also co-host of The Della Reese Show and hosted a number of television talk shows including A.M. New York and Mid-Morning LA. In addition, he was the host of the pilot for Hollywood Squares and often appeared as a celebrity contestant on this and other games shows.

He acted in many television programs, including a recurring role in Seinfeld as Jack Klompus. Episode "The Pen" featuring dialogue between Baron's character and Jerry that, as a critic wrote, "[was] one of many reasons Seinfeld has been compared to the plays of Samuel Beckett." He starred in Law & Order and took the role of Grandpa in a 1996 TV-movie revival of The Munsters, titled The Munsters' Scary Little Christmas. His appearances in feature films included Sweet November (1968), Targets (1968), If It's Tuesday, This Must Be Belgium (1969), The Out-of-Towners (1970), and Birdy (1984). Along with several of his contemporaries, Baron played himself in Woody Allen's Broadway Danny Rose (1984), and narrated the film.

Baron also wrote music, starting out in 1961 in the Brill Building in New York City with songs such as "Flying Blue Angels" and Adam Wade's "The Writing on The Wall". In 1971, he co-wrote Lou Rawls' hit "A Natural Man" with Bobby Hebb ("Sunny"). Baron wrote and recorded a number of comedy albums, including The Race Race and God Save the Queens co-written with Reverend James R. McGraw, editor/writer of Dick Gregory's books.

Throughout his career, he opened for Neil Diamond, Frank Sinatra, The Fifth Dimension, Bobby Vinton, Anthony Newley and Diana Ross among others.

== Personal life and death ==
Baron was married to model/actress Geraldine Baron, writer/activist Mary Jo Webster Baron, and writer/screenwriter Stephanie Ericsson, with each marriage ending in divorce. He had no children. Baron died on January 21, 2001, of emphysema in Van Nuys, California, at the age of 64.

== Television ==
Year	Title	Role	Notes
1965–1975	The Mike Douglas Show	Himself	
1966–1967	Hey, Landlord	Charles 'Chuck' Hookstratten	
1970–1971	Love, American Style	Salesman / Freddie	
1981	Cassie & Co.	John Stuart	
1981	An Evening At The Improv	Himself	
1990–1991	The Munsters Today	Yorga	
1991	Law & Order	Mike Lucia	
1991–1997	Seinfeld	Jack Klompus	6 episodes
1992	Walter & Emily	Stan	
1992	Life Goes On	Sam Berkson	
1996	Tracey Takes On...	Sheldon Sturges	
1996	The Munsters' Scary Little Christmas	Grandpa Munster	

== Filmography ==
Year	Title	Role	Notes
1968	Sweet November	Richard	
1968	Targets	Kip Larkin	
1969	If It's Tuesday, This Must Be Belgium	John Marino	
1969	Girls in the Saddle	Sandy Williams	
1970	The Magic Garden of Stanley Sweetheart	Man telling joke in bar	Uncredited
1970	The Out-of-Towners	TV Man	
1978	Straight Time	Manny	
1984	Broadway Danny Rose	Sandy Baron	
1984	Birdy	Mr. Columbato	
1986	Sid and Nancy	Hotelier - U.S.A.	
1986	Mission Kill	Bingo Thomas	
1986	Vamp	Vic	
1990	The Grifters	Doctor	
1991	Motorama	Kidnapping Husband	
1991	Lonely Hearts	Apartment Manager	
1994	Leprechaun 2	Morty	
1995	Twilight Highway	Lenny	
1998	The Hi-Lo Country	Henchman	
