= The Second Brooklyn Bridge =

Studio album by The Brooklyn Bridge
- Released: 1969
- Recorded: 1969
- Genre: Doo wop, R&B, pop, rock
- Length: 35:43
- Label: Buddah
- Producer: Wes Farrell

The Brooklyn Bridge chronology
Brooklyn Bridge (1968)	The Second Brooklyn Bridge (1969)	The Brooklyn Bridge (1970)

Professional ratings
Review scores
Source	Rating
AllMusic	1/5 stars

The Second Brooklyn Bridge is the second album from the Brooklyn Bridge. It was released in 1969 by Buddah Records.

== Track listing ==
1. "Without Her (Father Paul)" (Lee Pockriss, Shelly Pinz) – 3:30
2. "Minstrel Sunday" (Jon Lind) – 3:34
3. "Caroline" (Bodie Chandler) – 2:39
4. "You'll Never Walk Alone" (Oscar Hammerstein II, Richard Rodgers) – 4:53
5. "Inside Out (Upside Down)" (Jimmy Rosica, Shelly Davis) – 5:55
6. "Echo Park" (Buzz Clifford) / "Look at Me" (David Gates) – 7:01
7. "Your Husband-My Wife" (Irwin Levine, Toni Wine) – 3:01
8. "The 12:29 Is Taking My Baby Away" (Peter Lee Stirling) – 3:12
9. "In the End" (Tommy Sullivan) – 1:50

== Personnel ==
=== Brooklyn Bridge ===
- Johnny Maestro – lead vocals
- Richie Macioce – guitar
- Jimmy Rosica – bass guitar, vocals
- Carolyn Wood – organ
- Artie Cantanzarita – drums, trumpet
- Tommy Sullivan – saxophone, vocals, flute
- Joe Ruvio – saxophone, vocals
- Shelly Davis – trumpet, piano
- Fred Ferrara – vocals, guitar, trumpet
- Les Cauchi – vocals, piano
- Mike Gregorio – vocals, piano

=== Technical ===
- Wes Farrell – producer
- Brooklyn Bridge – arrangements
