= Johnny Maestro and The Brooklyn Bridge (album) =

Johnny Maestro and the Brooklyn Bridge

Studio album by Johnny Maestro & The Brooklyn Bridge
- Released: 1993
- Label: JABB Records
- Producer: Johnny Maestro

Johnny Maestro & The Brooklyn Bridge chronology
For Collectors Only (1992)	Johnny Maestro and the Brooklyn Bridge (1993)	Acappella (1994)

Professional ratings
Review scores
Source	Rating
AllMusic	3.5/5 stars

Johnny Maestro and the Brooklyn Bridge is a 1993 recorded and released collection of classic songs by The Brooklyn Bridge and The Crests, as well as other notable doo wop songs.

== Track listing ==
1. "The Angels Listened In"
2. "Gee"
3. "Isn't It Amazing"
4. "Sweetest One"
5. "Trouble in Paradise"
6. "Six Nights a Week"
7. "Pretty Little Angel"
8. "What a Surprise"
9. "Step by Step"
10. "I Thank The Moon"
11. "My Juanita"
12. "Sixteen Candles"
13. "Medley of Del Satins songs recorded with Dion DiMucci: Ruby Baby, Runaround Sue, The Wanderer"
14. "Your Husband, My Wife"
15. "Caroline"
16. "Little Bitty Pretty One"
17. "Blessed Is The Rain"
18. "Requiem"
19. "Unchained Melody"
20. "Free As The Wind"
21. "Welcome Me Love"
22. "My Prayer"
23. "The Worst That Could Happen"
24. "Lonely Teardrops"
25. "You'll Never Walk Alone"
