= The Bridge in Blue =

Studio album by The Bridge
- Released: 1972
- Recorded: 1971–1972
- Studio: Bell Sound Studios
- Label: Buddah Records
- Producer: Johnny Maestro

The Bridge chronology
The Johnny Maestro Story (1971)	The Bridge in Blue (1972)	Christmas Is... (1989)

Professional ratings
Review scores
Source	Rating
AllMusic	1/5 stars

The Bridge In Blue is the fourth and last album from the Brooklyn Bridge, renamed The Bridge, released by Buddah Records.

== Track listing ==
- All songs written by Loudon Wainwright III (Copyright Frank Music), except where noted.
1. "Bruno's Place" 4:14
2. "I Feel Free" 7:00 (Jack Bruce, Pete Brown; Casserole Music)
3. "School Days" 3:30
4. "Baby What You Want Me to Do" 4:45 (James Reed; Conrad Publishing)
5. "Glad to See You Got Religion" 4:00
6. "Uptown" 4:30
7. "Hospital Lady" 4:52
8. "Man in a Band" 11:21 (Jimmy Rosica; Kama Sutra Music/Sperbridge Music)

== Personnel ==
- Johnny Maestro: Vocals, bass and percussion
- Jimmy Rosica: Lead guitar, additional bass
- Jimmy Sarle: Additional (rhythm) guitars
- Fred Ferrara: Vocals, acoustic guitars and trumpet
- Shelly Davis: Piano and organ
- Steve Goldberg: Trombone, trumpet and flugelhorn
- Richard Grando: Saxophone, flute and percussion
- George Gregory: Drums, vocals

== Production ==
- Arranged by The (Brooklyn) Bridge
- Produced by Jimmy Maestro
- Recording and mix engineered by Sam Feldman at Bell Sound Studios
