= For Collectors Only =

Compilation album by Johnny Maestro & the Brooklyn Bridge
- Released: November 30, 1992
- Label: Collectables Records

Johnny Maestro & the Brooklyn Bridge chronology
The Greatest Hits of Johnny Maestro & The Brooklyn Bridge (1991)	For Collectors Only (1992)	Johnny Maestro and The Brooklyn Bridge (1993)

Professional ratings
Review scores
Source	Rating
AllMusic	2.5/5 stars

For Collectors Only is a now out-of-print two-disc set released by Collectables Records in 1992. It includes original recordings by The Brooklyn Bridge.

== Track listing ==
Disc: 1

1. "Blessed Is the Rain"
2. "Welcome Me Love"
3. "Which Way to Nowhere"
4. "Free as the Wind"
5. "Glad She's a Woman"
6. "2001"
7. "Requiem"
8. "Lonely Too Long"
9. "The Worst That Could Happen"
10. "Piece of My Heart"
11. "My Kite"
12. "Bruno's Place"
13. "I Feel Free"
14. "School Days"
15. "Baby, What You Do to Me"

Disc: 2

1. "Glad To See You've Got Religion"
2. "Uptown"
3. "Hospital Lady"
4. "Man in the Band"
5. "Father Paul"
6. "Minstrel Sunday"
7. "Caroline"
8. "Walk Alone"
9. "Upside Down"
10. "Echo Park"
11. "Look at Me"
12. "Your Husband, My Wife"
13. "12:29"
14. "In the Beginning"
