= Adam Wade (singer) =

American singer and actor (1935–2022)

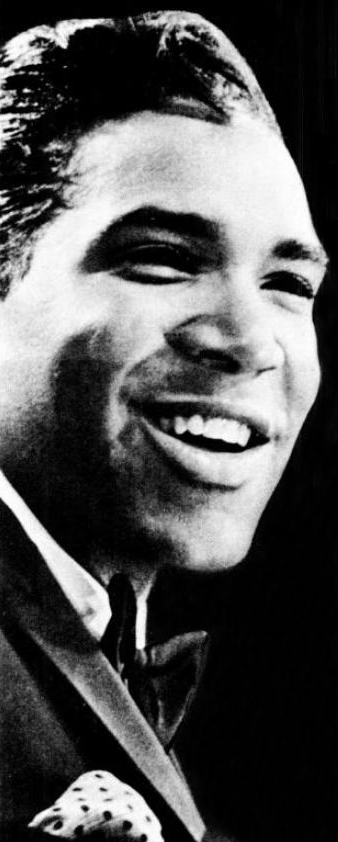
- Wade circa 1964
- Born: Patrick Henry Wade; March 17, 1935; Pittsburgh, Pennsylvania, U.S.
- Died: July 7, 2022 (aged 87); Montclair, New Jersey, U.S.
- Education: Virginia State College (attended)
- Occupations: Singer; musician; actor
- Years active: 1959–2022
- Spouses: Kay A. Wade (m. 1956; div. 1973); Jeree Wade (m. 1989)
- Children: 3
- Musical career
- Genres: Easy Listening; Traditional Pop; R&B; Soul; Disco
- Instruments: Vocals; drums
- Labels: Coed; Kirschner; Epic

Patrick Henry "Adam" Wade (March 17, 1935 – July 7, 2022) was an American singer, musician, and actor.

== Biography ==
=== Early life and education ===
Born in Pittsburgh, Pennsylvania, United States, to Pauline Simpson and Henry Oliver Wade, Jr., Wade was raised by his grandparents. Wade grew up in the East Liberty neighborhood and attended Westinghouse High School; graduating in 1952. After high school, Wade attended Virginia State University but dropped out in his sophomore year.

=== Career ===
After working for a time as a lab assistant with Dr. Jonas Salk on the polio research team, Wade began to pursue a recording career, signing with Coed Records in late 1959. He had his first hit in early 1960 (No. 58) with the song "Ruby", a cover of the hit movie song of 1953.

Wade was popular in the early-1960s. In 1961 three of his recordings ("Take Good Care of Her" (No. 7), "As If I Didn't Know" (No. 10) and "The Writing on the Wall" (No. 5) made the Top Ten in the Billboard Hot 100 chart. These songs also made the Top Five of Billboard's Easy Listening survey. Wade released the following albums in the United Kingdom: Adam and Evening in 1961 and Adam Wade One Is A Lonely Number in 1962. Wade also released an EP in 1960, And Then Came Adam. "Take Good Care of Her" reached No. 38 in the UK Singles Chart in June 1961. Wade's vocal style was generally compared to that of his contemporary Johnny Mathis. But it was actually a singer from an earlier period, Nat King Cole, who was his principal influence. In a Connecticut Public Radio interview, Wade said: "My father introduced me to Nat’s music when I was a kid. He was my idol since high school."

In 1975, Wade became the first African-American to host a television game show, with the premiere of Musical Chairs. He starred in a stage production of Guys and Dolls in 1978, and hosted the talk show Mid-Morning LA. In 1979, he co-starred with Della Reese in a production of Same Time, Next Year. On TV he was seen in the soap operas The Guiding Light and Search for Tomorrow, and was a familiar presence on such popular black-oriented sitcoms as Sanford & Son, The Jeffersons, What's Happening!! and Good Times. In the late–1970s and early–1980s Wade began to concentrate on acting, and appeared in several of the so-called blaxploitation movies, including Gordon's War.

Wade briefly returned to recording, producing a self–titled album on the Kirschner record label, which was distributed by Columbia Records. This was a venture into a more soulful singing genre. It met with moderate success but is still a favorite with his loyal fans. He appeared in one episode of The Dukes of Hazzard. His latest theatrical appearance was with the 2008 touring company of the play The Color Purple. Wade and his wife have a music production firm, Songbird, whose headquarters are in New Jersey.

== Death ==
A resident of Montclair, New Jersey following his marriage in 1989, Wade died there on July 7, 2022, at age 87. He had battled Parkinson’s disease.

== Personal life ==
Wade was married twice and had three children. Wade's first marriage was to his high school sweetheart Kay A. Wade from 1956 until 1973. Together, they had three children; Sheldon (Ramel) Wade, Patrice Johnson Wade and Michael (Jamel) Wade. Wade was married to Jeree Wade in 1989, and their marriage lasted until his death. The two often performed together, and Wade revealed in an interview that he met Jeree on the set of Musical Chairs.

== Discography ==
=== Albums ===
- And Then Came Adam (Coed, 1960)
- Adam and Evening (Coed, 1961)
- Adam Wade's Greatest Hits (Epic, 1962)
- One Is a Lonely Number (Epic, 1962)
- What Kind of Fool Am I? (Epic, 1963)
- A Very Good Year for Girls (Epic, 1963)
- Adam Wade (Kirshner, 1977)

=== Singles ===
Year	Titles (A-side, B-side) Both sides from same album except where indicated	Chart positions			Album
Year	Titles (A-side, B-side) Both sides from same album except where indicated	US	US AC	US R&B	Album
1960	"Tell Her for Me" b/w "Don't Cry, My Love" (Non-album track)	66	—	—	And Then Came Adam
1960	"Ruby" b/w "Too Far" (Non-album track)	58	—	—	And Then Came Adam
1960	"I Can't Help It" b/w "I Had the Craziest Dream" (from And Then Came Adam)	64	—	—	Adam Wade's Greatest Hits
1960	"Speaking of Her" b/w "Blackout the Moon" (Non-album track)	—	—	—	Adam Wade's Greatest Hits
1960	"In Pursuit of Happiness" b/w "For the Want of Your Love"	—	—	—	Non-album tracks
1960	"Gloria's Theme" b/w "Dreamy"	74	—	—	Adam and Evening
1961	"Take Good Care of Her"; Original B-side: "Sleepy Time Gal" (from Adam and Evening); Later B-side: "Too Far" (Non-album track)	7	—	20	Adam Wade's Greatest Hits
1961	"The Writing on the Wall" /	5	5	20	Adam Wade's Greatest Hits
1961	"Point of No Return"	85	—	—	Non-album track
1961	"As If I Didn't Know" b/w "Playin' Around" (Non-album track)	10	4	16	Adam Wade's Greatest Hits
1961	"Tonight I Won't Be There" /	61	14	—	Adam Wade's Greatest Hits
1961	"Linda"	94	—	—	Adam Wade's Greatest Hits
1961	"Preview of Paradise" b/w "Cold, Cold Winter"	108	—	—	Non-album tracks
1962	"How Are Things in Lovers Lane" /	114	—	—	Non-album tracks
1962	"It's Good to Have You Back with Me"	109	—	—	Non-album tracks
1962	"For the First Time in My Life" b/w "Little Miss Lovely"	118	—	—	Non-album tracks
1962	"I'm Climbin' the Wall" b/w "They Didn't Believe Me"	—	—	—	Non-album tracks
1962	"There'll Be No Teardrops Tonight" b/w "Here Comes the Pain" (Non-album track)	104	—	—	What Kind of Fool Am I?
1963	"Don't Let Me Cross Over" b/w "Rain from the Skies"	117	—	—	Non-album tracks
1963	"Teenage Mona Lisa" b/w "Why Do We Have to Wait So Long"	—	—	—	Non-album tracks
1963	"Theme from 'Irma La Douce' (Look Again)" b/w "Let's Make the Most of a Beautiful Thing"	—	—	—	Non-album tracks
1963	"Does Goodnight Mean Goodbye" b/w "Charade"	—	—	—	Non-album tracks
1964	"Seven Loves for Seven Days" b/w "A Whisper Away"	—	—	—	Non-album tracks
1964	"When April Smiles at Me" b/w "Pencil and Paper"	—	—	—	Non-album tracks
1965	"Crying in the Chapel" b/w "Broken Hearted Stranger"	88	20	—	Non-album tracks
1965	"A Lover's Question" b/w "It's Been a Long Time Comin'"	—	—	—	Non-album tracks
1965	"Garden in the Rain" b/w "Play Some Music for Broken Hearts"	—	—	—	Non-album tracks
1965	"The Time for Dreams" b/w "Garden of Eden"	—	—	—	Non-album tracks
1966	"Solitude" b/w "How Can I Leave You"	—	—	—	Non-album tracks
1966	"A Man Alone" b/w "Wheels on the Highway"	—	—	—	Non-album tracks
1967	"Julie on My Mind" b/w "With One Exception"	—	—	—	Non-album tracks
1968	"Maybe" b/w "Everyone Is Looking for That Someone"	—	—	—	Non-album tracks
1968	"Rome" b/w "Old Devil Moon"	—	—	—	Non-album tracks
1977	"Keeping Up with the Joneses" b/w "Russell Never Had a Chance"	—	—	—	Adam Wade
1989	"She Don't Want Anything" b/w "There's More to a Man Than Just a Name"	—	—	—	Non-album tracks
