= Welcome Me Love =

Single by The Brooklyn Bridge
- B-side: "Blessed Is the Rain"
- Released: May 1969
- Genre: Pop
- Length: 2:20
- Label: Buddah
- Songwriter: Tony Romeo
- Producer: Wes Farrell

The Brooklyn Bridge singles chronology
"Worst That Could Happen" (1968)	"Welcome Me Love" (1969)	"Your Husband - My Wife" (1969)

"Welcome Me Love" is a 1969 song by The Brooklyn Bridge. It was issued as the B-side of "Blessed Is the Rain," (Canada #48, U.S. #45) but became a double-sided hit.

As "Blessed Is the Rain" descended the charts, "Welcome Me Love", garnered enough airplay to become an equal-sized hit. It reached number 48 U.S. Billboard and number 47 on Cash Box. In Canada, it definitively became the bigger hit, spending two weeks at number 38.

Internationally, "Welcome Me Love" was then re-issued as the A-side, still backed with "Blessed is the Rain."

== Chart history ==
Chart (1969)	Peak position
Canada RPM Top Singles	38
U.S. Billboard Hot 100	48
U.S. Cash Box Top 100	47
