= 16 Candles (song) =

Single by The Crests
- B-side: "Beside You"
- Released: October 1958 (US)
- Genre: Doo-wop
- Label: Coed
- Songwriters: Luther Dixon and Allyson R. Khent

"16 Candles" is a 1958 song performed by the Crests and written by Luther Dixon and Allyson R. Khent. The single was originally released in 1958 on Coed Records. (#506)

== Track listing ==
7" vinyl

1. "16 Candles"
2. "Beside You"

== Chart performance ==
The song peaked at No. 2 on the Billboard Hot 100 chart, while "Stagger Lee" by Lloyd Price was at No. 1. "16 Candles" also went No. 4 on the US R&B chart for 21 weeks in 1959. In Canada it reached No. 5.

== In popular culture ==
This song has appeared prominently in several 'entertainment' contexts, including at least two major Hollywood [motion picture] productions. It was an example of a typical doo-wop song in the 1973 movie American Graffiti and it had somewhat of a 'title role' in the 1984 movie Sixteen Candles.

== Covers ==
- A cover by Jerry Lee Lewis peaked at No. 61 on the Billboard Hot Country Singles chart in 1986.
- The Jackson 5 did a cover of this song for their album, Maybe Tomorrow. This cover has since been re-released along with their greatest hits albums.
- A rockabilly cover by Stray Cats was used as the title song to the eponymous movie. This version was also featured in the soundtrack of the first season of Chilling Adventures of Sabrina.
- A cover by Sha Na Na was performed live and recorded on their album Golden Age of Rock'n'Roll in 1973.
