= The Crests =

- Origin: New York City, New York, U.S.
- Genres: Doo-wop; R&B; rock and roll
- Years active: 1954–1978; 1980–present
- Labels: Coed; Joyce

The Crests are an American doo-wop group, formed by bass vocalist J.T. Carter in the mid 1950s. The group had several Top 40 hits in the late 1950s and early 1960s on Coed Records. Their most popular song, "16 Candles", rose to No. 2 on the Billboard Hot 100 chart in February 1959 selling over one million copies and earning a gold disc status. The group's other hits include "Step By Step," "The Angels Listened In," "Trouble In Paradise," "Six Nights A Week," and "A Year Ago Tonight." The Crests were one of the earliest racially mixed doo wop groups, consisting of three African American members (one female), one Puerto Rican, named Harold Torres, and one Italian American.

== Career ==
Founded by J.T. Carter, the group included Talmadge "Tommy" Gough (1939–2014), Harold "Chico" Torres (deceased) and Patricia Van Dross (1943–1993) (older sister of R&B singer Luther Vandross). Carter selected vocalist Johnny Mastrangelo (1939–2010) (shortened to Johnny Mastro and later changed to Johnny Maestro) as lead vocalist.

The Crests were discovered in 1956 while singing in the New York City Subway by the wife of orchestra leader Al Browne. Browne connected the group with Joyce Records where they recorded their first two songs, "My Juanita" and "Sweetest One".

In 1957, they charted with their first release, "Sweetest One", on Joyce Records.

After recording two more singles for Joyce Records, Patricia Van Dross left The Crests in 1958 to finish her education.

Their next single after "16 Candles" on COED Records was "Six Nights A Week" which hit No. 28 on the Billboard Hot 100 Charts and No. 17 on the R&B. Their next release "Flower Of Love" was bland compared to other Crests cuts and attained only a six-week run-up to No. 79.

From 1958 to 1960 the group was almost always on the road. In the late 1950s, The Crests performed on several national teen dance television shows, including American Bandstand and The Dick Clark Show. They appeared seven times on the latter.

In 1961, The Crests recorded a new single, "Little Miracles", with Tony Middleton, lead singer of The Willows, singing lead; it was their first single not to chart in the Top 100. Gough quit the group after the single, moving to Detroit, to work for auto giant General Motors, and was replaced by Gary "Kit" Lewis (not to be confused with Gary Lewis of Gary Lewis & the Playboys fame).

Maestro recorded with other backup singers under the name "Johnny Maestro & The Crests", producing a single for United Artists in 1962, two singles for Cameo Records in 1963–64, a single for APT Records in 1965, a single for Scepter Records in 1965, and three singles for the Parkway label in 1966.

James Ancrum then took over the lead, recording "Guilty" in January 1962 and charting only to No. 123. The group went back to touring when their 1963 Selma side "Did I Remember?" flopped. A 1964 sequel to "16 Candles", "You Blew Out The Candles", also was not successful.

In 1965, J.T. Carter and Mel Tillison signed with Decca Records and were chosen to be the potential artists of the year to come. Carter wrote, "Closer To Your Heart" and "The Wild Ones", originally written for Jordan Christopher's group The Wild Ones. Internal problems prevented Decca from securing the worldwide release of these recordings and the company folded, leaving all their artists in limbo.

By 1968, Johnny Maestro had joined with The Del Satins as their lead singer and merged with The Rhythm Method in March 1968 to become The Brooklyn Bridge. In 1969, they had a No. 3 hit with "The Worst That Could Happen."

By then Torres was gone; he had moved to upstate New York and become a jeweler, but the group continued as a trio of Carter, Ancrum, and Lewis and had become a lounge act, disbanding in 1978. Carter went to sing with Charlie Thomas' Drifters for a year, then moved to Plainfield, New Jersey to teach voice and set up his own recording studio. Lewis later joined The Cadillacs.

In 1973, Carter met his wife Leona, an accomplished classical pianist/composer. Leona Carter has been a part of The Crests since then.

Carter reformed The Crests in 1980, auditioning over 200 singers at his studio, finally settling on lead Bill Damon (a Maestro sound-alike), Greg Sereck, Dennis Ray and New York drummer, Jon Ihle. The group continued well into the 1990s and toured with a five-piece band including Leona Carter on keys.

In 1982 J.T. Carter created yet another re-incarnation of "The Crests" recruiting singing/keyboardist, Bill Pascali, taking the place of Johnnie Maestro on vocals and Guy Boise on Drums. They toured from New Jersey to New Zealand on a 6 month tour excursion. Shortly after Pascali's return to the States, he moved onto Randy and the Rainbows.

The 1984 John Hughes' teen film Sixteen Candles took its title from The Crests' song, which was re-recorded by The Stray Cats for the Sixteen Candles soundtrack.

In June 1987, for a concert in Peekskill, New York, Maestro, Carter, Torres, and Gough (The Original Crests) reunited as "The Crests", which was organized by Carter.

From 1990 to 2010, Johnny Maestro invited Carter to join him and The Brooklyn Bridge to record with them and to re-record some of their greatest hits.

From the late 2000s until the early 2010s, Carter's group consisted of Carter, Carter's wife Leona, Barry Newman and Terry King (formerly of The Drifters). They later became Carter, Newman, King & Richie Merritt (formerly of The Clovers and The Marcels) instead of Carter's wife. Michael D'Amore also sang with this lineup for a time.

In April 2010, the Los Angeles-based rights-management firm Beach Road Music, LLC, acquired the Coed Records catalog, subsequently re-releasing The Crests' song "The Great Physician" on the 2011 compilation album From The Vault: The Coed Records Lost Master Tapes, Volume 1. "The Great Physician" was originally released in 1960 as Coed 527, under the pseudonym "Johnny Masters" in an attempt to boost Maestro as a solo performer.

On November 12, 2013, Carter was recognized on the Pennsylvania State House Floor for a lifetime in music and as the first African American to form an interracial vocal group in the United States.

In 2013, Carter also appeared on the 1st Annual Palisades Park Reunion concert with Cousin Brucie aka Bruce Morrow, broadcast live on SiriusXM satellite radio. Other performers included Neil Sedaka, Lesley Gore, Bobby Lewis and Ronnie Spector. Carter was also asked to return two years later for Cousin Brucie's 3rd Annual Palisades Park Reunion concert.

In January 2014, Carter interviewed Joe Franklin on the Bloomberg Radio network.

In 2014, Carter also began production on "American Classics: The Stars, Music and Cars", a TV show featuring the music and cars of the 1950s and 1960s, produced by Emmy Awards winner Ashley Russo.

In March 2015, Carter was accepted as a member of The Recording Academy.

In 2016, Carter performed as J.T. Carter's Crests, based on provisions of the Truth in Music Act. Carter's new lineup included Carter back with Richard Merritt, plus Ken Boulden aka Kenny Grey (formerly of Solid Gold) and one other member, who was replaced by Russell Gore, Jr., (former lead singer of The Original Tymes) after their first show. J.T. Carter's Crests held their first concert in Upland, California, on July 16, 2016, to a sold-out crowd and received standing ovations.

In March 2018 at the age of 76, Carter appeared on the PBS Music special "My Music: Doo Wop Generations", which was aired nationally. TJ Lubinsky, Bowzer and Little Anthony hosted the event. The event was structured to feature new young doo-wop talent, and featured Peter Lemongello, Jr. Over 20 million people tuned in.

== Later career ==
On August 4, 2017, J.T. Carter came together with a new group of "Crests", consisting of 17-year-old Peter Lemongello, Jr. (son of Peter Lemongello) and tenors Joe Rivera (formerly of Earl Lewis & The Channels) and Luis Mercado of The Fabulaires, to perform in an R&B music festival in Indian Head, Maryland, the following day. After only one show, Mercado was replaced by D.R. Moyer, who had sung with a number of groups including The Platters, The Dubs, The Paragons and The Jarmels. Former Jarmels member Ray Orta was also called in as a fill-in replacement for Joe Rivera.

On December 12, 2017, J.T. Carter's Crests performed at The Paramount Theatre in Asbury Park, New Jersey, along with over 40 other groups from the 1950s and '60s, as part of TJ Lubinsky's new PBS TV Special, "Doo Wop Generations" (part of the "My Music" series). The special aired nationally in the US on PBS on March 3, 2018.

The group was featured singing "The Angels Listened In" on the PBS television broadcast, as well as "Step By Step" listed on the CD/DVD track listing.

On September 22, 2018, J.T. Carter's Crests appeared at The State Theatre in New Brunswick, New Jersey on the first ever "Alan Freed Brooklyn Paramount Reunion Jubilee of Stars." Also appearing on the bill were Charlie Thomas & The Drifters, Leon Hughes & The Coasters, The Flamingos, The Chantels, The Belmonts, The Knockouts & Kid Kyle. Every group featured one original member who actually played at the Paramount. The Crests left the stage with two standing ovations and received global publicity. At the end, J.T. Carter was presented an award as the last surviving original founding member of The Crests.

On October 23, 2018, JT Carter announced in an interview on WKHS that he was no longer working with Peter Lemongello, Jr. at the present time, claiming that they had "different interests".

As of 2018, Carter was still performing throughout the US and Canada, appearing with Charlie Thomas and his Drifters on occasion.

== Death of original members ==
Patricia Vandross died of complications from diabetes in 1993 when she was 50.

Johnny Maestro (born John Peter Mastrangelo, May 7, 1939, Manhattan, New York) lived in Islip, New York, until 2003. He died of cancer on March 24, 2010, at his home in Cape Coral, Florida, when he was 70.

Tommy Gough (born Talmadge E. Gough, October 15, 1939, Sardis, Georgia) died of throat cancer on August 24, 2014, at his home in Flint, Michigan, when he was 74.

Harold "Chico" Torres later became a handyman and moved back to New York City. He died in Brooklyn on July 18, 2024.

J.T. Carter, the last surviving original member, died on April 5, 2025, at the age of 83.

== Awards and recognition ==
The Crests were inducted into the United in Group Harmony Association (UGHA) Hall of Fame in 2000. The Crests were inducted into The Vocal Group Hall of Fame in 2004. The Crests were inducted into The Doo Wop Hall of Fame in 2008. The Crests were inducted into The Doo Wop Music Hall of Fame in 2015.

On May 9, 2012, Johnny Maestro was honored by the House of Representatives of the United States of America. Congressman Jerrold Nadler of New York, whose district includes the neighborhood where Maestro was born and where he began his music career, introduced an Extension of Remarks in the House of Representatives. This posthumous honor is now a permanent part of the Congressional Record. The Extension of Remarks includes the original members of The Crests.

On November 12, 2013, J.T. Carter was honored by the Pennsylvania State House, Speaker of the House Sam Smith, and PA State Representative Rosemary M Brown, for his lifetime in the music industry and for being the first African American to form an interracial vocal group in the America. Carter was officially recognized on the state house floor.

In 2014, Carter was honored with a lifetime achievement award from The Lehigh Valley Music Awards in Allentown, Pennsylvania.

In 2016, J.T. Carter, Charlie Thomas of The Drifters and Ernest Wright of Little Anthony & The Imperials were honored in both House and Senate chambers at the State Capital in Dover, Delaware, for their contributions to American Music, declaring them "Rock-n-Roll Royalty". The three also met with Governor Jack A. Markell, who presented them a special Gubernatorial tribute. (148th General Assembly, State of Delaware Senate Concurrent Resolution No: 53, March 22, 2016), (State of Delaware, Office of the Governor Tribute No: 160201).

== Discography ==
Title	Year	Peak chart positions			Record label	Notes
Title	Year	US Hot 100	US R&B	CAN	Record label	Notes
A: "Sweetest One" B: "My Juanita"	1957	86	—	—	Joyce	Recorded in early 1957; Recorded in early 1957
A: "No One To Love" B: "Wish She Was Mine"	1957	—	—	—	Joyce	Recorded on May 22, 1957; Recorded on May 22, 1957
A: "Pretty Little Angel" B: "I Thank The Moon"	1958	—	—	—	Coed	Recorded on June 25, 1958; Recorded on June 25, 1958
A: "16 Candles" (originally the B-side) B: "Beside You"	1958	2	4	5	Coed	Recorded on August 12, 1958; Recorded on June 25, 1958
A: "Six Nights A Week" B: "I Do"	1959	28	17	24	Coed	Recorded on January 14, 1959; Recorded on January 14, 1959
A: "Flower Of Love" B: "Molly Mae"	1959	79	—	—	Coed	Recorded on January 14, 1959; Recorded on August 12, 1958
A: "The Angels Listened In" B: "I Thank The Moon"	1959	22	14	6	Coed	Recorded on March 24, 1959; Recorded on June 25, 1958
A: "A Year Ago Tonight" B: "Paper Crown"	1959	42	—	—	Coed	Recorded on October 11, 1959; Recorded on October 11, 1959
A: "Step By Step" B: "Gee (But I'd Give The World)"	1960	14	—	12	Coed	Recorded on January 18, 1960; Recorded on January 18, 1960
A: "Trouble In Paradise" B: "Always You"	1960	20	—	11	Coed	Recorded on May 4, 1960; Recorded on May 04, 1960
A: "Journey Of Love" B: "If My Heart Could Write A Letter"	1960	81	—	—	Coed	Recorded on January 18, 1960; Recorded on May 04, 1960
A: "Isn't It Amazing" B: "Molly Mae"	1960	100	—	—	Coed	Recorded on May 4, 1960; Recorded on August 12, 1958
A: "I'll Remember (In The Still Of The Night)" B: "Good Golly Miss Molly"	1960	—	—	—	Coed	Recorded on March 24, 1959
A: "Say It Isn't So" B: "The Great Physician"	1960	—	—	—	Coed	Recorded on January 18, 1960; Recorded on January 18, 1960
A: "Model Girl" B: "We've Got To Tell Them"	1961	20	—	—	Coed	Recorded on December 29, 1960; Recorded on December 29, 1960
A: "What A Surprise" B: "The Warning Voice"	1961	33	—	—	Coed	Recorded on December 19, 1960; Recorded on December 29, 1960
A: "Little Miracles" B: "Baby I Gotta' Know"	1961	—	—	—	Coed	Recorded late 1961, released December 1961; Tony Middleton singing lead
A: "The Actor" B: "Three Tears In A Bucket"	1962	—	—	—	Trans Atlas	James Ancrum singing lead
A: "Guilty" B: "Number One With Me"	1962	—	—	—	Selma	James Ancrum singing lead
A: "Did I Remember" B: "Tears Will Fall"	1963	—	—	—	Selma	James Ancrum singing lead
A: "A Love To Last A Lifetime" B: "You Blew Out The Candles"	1964	—	—	—	Coral	James Ancrum singing lead

=== Unreleased recordings ===
Title	Year	Record label	Notes
"Strange Love"	1958	Coed	Recorded on June 25, 1958; Released in 1991
"Let Me Be The One"	1959	Coed	Recorded on January 14, 1959; Released in 1991
"Young Love"	1959	Coed	Recorded on October 11, 1959; Released in 1990
"You Took The Joy Out Of Spring"	1960	Coed	Recorded on May 4, 1960; Released in 1991
"Learning 'Bout Love"	1960	Coed	Recorded on May 4, 1960; Released in 1991
"Let True Love Begin"	1960	Coed	Recorded on December 19, 1960; Released in 1991
"Keep Away From Carol"	1960	Coed	Recorded on December 29, 1960; Released in 1991
