= Coed Records =

- Parent company: Beach Road Music, LLC
- Founded: 1958
- Founder: George Paxton, Marvin Cane
- Status: Active
- Genre: Doo-wop, pop
- Country of origin: United States

George Paxton and Marvin Cane formed Coed Records, Inc. in New York City in 1958, and had offices at 1619 Broadway in the Brill Building. George Paxton produced many of the songs on this label, most of which were of the East Coast Doo-wop group style, and some of these became hit songs of the day. Between 1958 and 1965, Coed's biggest acts included the Crests, the Rivieras, the Duprees, the Harptones, Trade Martin and Adam Wade, among others.

Frequently working with arranger & songwriter Fred Weismantel, Paxton's big-band background came in particularly handy with the Duprees, who combined group vocals with deliberately nostalgic swing orchestra backing on hits like "You Belong to Me" and "Why Don't You Believe Me." Other highlights include The Crests' "16 Candles" and three songs from the group's so-called "angel series," "The Angels Listened In," "Pretty Little Angel," and "Trouble In Paradise". Coed Records' final singles were released in 1965.

Future co-founder of A&M Records, Jerry Moss, began his music career promoting The Crests' "16 Candles" record for Coed.

In April 2010, the Coed Records catalogue was acquired by Los Angeles-based rights-management firm Beach Road Music, LLC. In January 2011, Beach Road released the album From The Vault: The Coed Records Lost Master Tapes Volume 1.

== See also ==
- List of record labels
