= Worst That Could Happen =

1967 song by Jimmy Webb

Single by the Brooklyn Bridge

from the album Brooklyn Bridge
- B-side: "Your Kite, My Kite"
- Released: December 1968
- Genre: Pop
- Length: 2:58
- Label: Buddah
- Songwriter: Jimmy Webb
- Producer: Wes Farrell

The Brooklyn Bridge singles chronology
"Worst That Could Happen" (1968)	"Blessed Is the Rain" / "Welcome Me Love" (1969)

"Worst That Could Happen" is a song with lyrics and music written by singer-songwriter Jimmy Webb. Originally recorded by the 5th Dimension on its 1967 album of nearly all-Jimmy Webb songs, The Magic Garden, "Worst That Could Happen" was later recorded by the Brooklyn Bridge and reached the Billboard Hot 100's top 40, at #38 on January 4, 1969, peaking at #3 on February 1-8, 1969.

== Overview ==
The song tells about a man wishing well to a woman with whom he is still in love, but because the man was unwilling to settle down, she left him and is about to marry someone else who is more stable; the singer accepts the marriage but still feels that it is "the worst (thing) that could happen to (him)". It has been stated that, along with "MacArthur Park" and "By the Time I Get to Phoenix", "Worst That Could Happen" is about a relationship that Webb had with a woman named Susan.

The song quotes Mendelssohn's "Wedding March" from the incidental music to A Midsummer Night's Dream at the end.

The Brooklyn Bridge version appeared on the list of songs deemed inappropriate by Clear Channel following the September 11, 2001, attacks.

== Charts ==
=== Weekly charts ===
Chart (1968–69)	Peak position
Canada RPM Top Singles	1
New Zealand (Listener)	16
US Billboard Hot 100	3
US Cash Box Top 100	4

=== Year-end charts ===
Chart (1969)	Rank
Canada	46
US Billboard Hot 100	74
US Cash Box Top 100	39

== Notable cover versions ==
- Hajji Alejandro recorded a Tagalog version titled "Panakip-Butas" in 1977 in his Hajji album. It was released as a single and was a big hit in the Philippines. The melody was also used by Tito, Vic & Joey as one of the parody songs in their 1977 album, called "Kajjo Department", with different lyrics.

== See also ==
- List of 1960s one-hit wonders in the United States
