= The Brooklyn Bridge (band) =

American popular music group

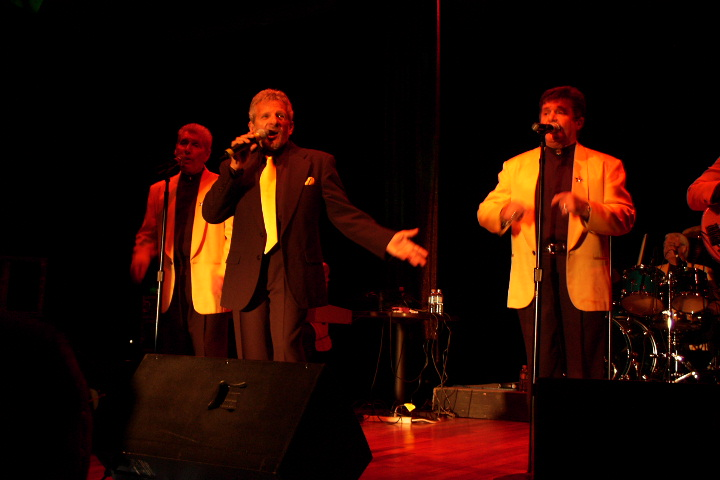
- Johnny Maestro (center) with Freddy Ferrara (left) and Les Cauchi (right) of Johnny Maestro & the Brooklyn Bridge at a 2006 show

Background information
- Also known as: The Bridge; Johnny Maestro & The Brooklyn Bridge
- Origin: New York City, U.S.
- Genres: R&B, pop, rock
- Years active: 1968–present
- Labels: Buddah, Collectables
- Spinoff of: The Del-Satins
- Members: Ed Gaudio; Marty D'Amico; Jimmy Rosica; Lou Agiesta; Mike Ernst; John Williams; Vinny Pizzo
- Past members: Johnny Maestro; Roy Michaels; Tom Sullivan; Mike Gregorio; Freddy Ferrara; Les Cauchi; Carolyn Wood; Richie Macioce; Ed Lisciandro; Shelly Davis; Artie Cantanzarita; Tony Trombino "Smitty" Edward Smith; Joe Esposito; Jimmy Sarle; Ben Sudano; Rick Solomon (substituted briefly in 1968)

The Brooklyn Bridge (also known as The Bridge and as Johnny Maestro & The Brooklyn Bridge since the 1980s) is an American musical group, best known for their million-selling rendition of Jimmy Webb's "Worst That Could Happen" (1968).

== History ==
New York City-born Johnny Maestro (born John Peter Mastrangelo a.k.a. Johnny Mastro, Johnny Masters; May 7, 1939 – March 24, 2010) began his career in 1957 as the original lead singer of The Crests, one of the first interracial groups of the recording industry. Patricia Van Dross, older sister of the R&B singer Luther Vandross, sang with Johnny Maestro while The Crests were signed to the Joyce Record label. Before The Crests signed with Coed Records, Van Dross left the group because her mother did not want her 15-year-old daughter touring with the older guys. After a regional hit with "My Juanita"/"Sweetest One" on the Joyce label, he had three years of chart success with The Crests on Coed Records with "16 Candles", "Six Nights A Week", "Step by Step", "The Angels Listened In", and "Trouble in Paradise". Between "Step by Step" and "Trouble in Paradise", Coed released a single "The Great Physician"/"Say It Isn't So" under the name Johnny Masters. Late in 1960, Maestro would leave The Crests for a solo career. Maestro was unable to reach the chart heights he had with The Crests, but did have Top 40 hits with "What A Surprise" and "Model Girl" in 1961 as solo artist Johnny Mastro, "The Voice of the Crests" for Coed Records. For his next three singles with the label, he was known as Johnny Maestro, the third spelling change for the label. None of those records charted and Maestro recorded for three different labels before recording with new backup singers (none from the original group) as Johnny Maestro & The Crests in 1965 and 1966, which produced four singles on two more labels.

By 1967, another New York vocal group called The Del-Satins—who had become well known in the New York area as weekly performers on the local dance party program The Clay Cole Show, had made several non-charting recordings between 1959 and 1967 under their own name, and were noted for backing up Dion on his post-Belmonts recordings—were looking for a new lead singer to replace original lead Stan Zizka. Members were brothers Fred and Tom Ferrara (baritone and bass), Les Cauchi (first tenor; born Leslie Emanuel Cauchi, December 18, 1942 – March 3, 2020) and Bobby Faila (second tenor). According to Cauchi, members of the group ran into Maestro at a local gym, playing his guitar, and approached him with the offer to join the group. After initially turning them down, Maestro's manager, Betty Sperber, called Cauchi and told him Maestro had changed his mind.

In 1968, Sperber, owner and founder of the talent management and booking agency Action Talents in New York City, was hosting her once a month Battle of the Bands talent search at the Cloud Nine nightclub in Long Island and brought Maestro along as the evening's special guest star. Action Talents' Vice President and General Manager Alan White suggested that Maestro be backed up that night by a seven-piece brass-filled group of youngsters called The Rhythm Method. The show included renditions of the Beatles' "Day Tripper", the Beach Boys' "Keep an Eye On Summer", and James Brown's "Cold Sweat". That night's performance was such a success that the next day Sperber decided to combine the talents of Maestro, the four Del-Satins, and The Rhythm Method. The new group's name came about after White made the off-handed comment that "it would be easier to sell the Brooklyn Bridge" than book the proposed 11-piece act.

Johnny and the Bridge rehearsed their unusual combination of smooth vocal harmonies and full horns, and signed a recording contract with Buddah Records. Their first release, a version of the Jimmy Webb song "Worst That Could Happen" (previously recorded by The 5th Dimension), reached No. 3 on the Billboard pop chart. It sold over one and a quarter million copies, and was awarded a gold disc by the R.I.A.A. The follow-up, "Welcome Me Love", and its flip side, "Blessed is the Rain" — both by Tony Romeo — each reached the Top 50. A dramatic version of "You'll Never Walk Alone" and the controversial "Your Husband, My Wife" also reached the middle ranges of the chart. The group sold over 10 million records by 1972, including LP sales, mostly produced by Wes Farrell. Appearances on The Ed Sullivan Show, The Della Reese Show, and other programs helped to bring the group to the national stage.

After its heyday, the Brooklyn Bridge downsized to a five-man group, with the vocalists playing their own instruments. For example, on stage Maestro played rhythm guitar, while former Rhythm Method bassist Jim Rosica picked up a vocal part. Later in the 1970s, as the Rock and Roll Revival evolved from a nostalgic fad to a respected genre, the group added members, retaining its core vocalists. By 1985, the group had solidified into an eight-piece group, including original Del Satins, Cauchi, Fred Ferrara, and original Bridge member Rosica, augmented by a horn section for special occasions. The drummer for the current line-up, Lou Agiesta, was the drummer for the original American touring company of Jesus Christ Superstar (1970). Today he is drummer (Brooklyn Bridge) and sub drummer for Little Anthony and The Imperials.

The later version of the Brooklyn Bridge released a Christmas EP in 1989 and a greatest-hits compilation in 1993, re-recording Maestro's hits with The Crests. In the early 1990s, Maestro moonlighted as the background tenor on Joel Katz's studio project CD Joel & the Dymensions (which also featured baritone-bass Bobby Jay). In 1994, The Brooklyn Bridge recorded the 10-song CD Acappella.

On December 5, 1999, the Brooklyn Bridge was featured in one of PBS's biggest fundraising events ever, "Doo Wop 50", performing both "16 Candles" and "Worst That Could Happen"; the entire program was released on VHS and DVD. In 2005, the Brooklyn Bridge released a full concert-length DVD as part of the Pops Legends Live series. They continue to tour and in 2004 released a CD on the Collectables label titled Today, featuring more re-recordings of their hits and versions of other groups' songs of the 1950s and 1960s.

The Brooklyn Bridge was inducted into the Vocal Group Hall of Fame in 2005. They were inducted into the South Carolina Music (Rhythm & Blues) Hall of Fame in May 2006 and the Long Island Music Hall of Fame on October 15, 2006.

In 2007, Collectables Records reissued the Johnny Maestro & Brooklyn Bridge's 2002 album Peace on Earth as Songs of Inspiration. On March 31, 2009, the album Today, Volume 2 was released on CD by Collectables Records.

Johnny Maestro died on March 24, 2010, from cancer in Cape Coral, Florida, at age 70.

In April 2010, the Los Angeles-based rights-management firm Beach Road Music, LLC, acquired the Coed Records catalog, subsequently re-releasing the Maestro song "The Great Physician" on the 2011 compilation album From The Vault: The Coed Records Lost Master Tapes, Volume 1. "The Great Physician" was originally released in 1960 as Coed 527, under the pseudonym "Johnny Masters".

Frederick "Fred" Ferrara died on October 21, 2011, of cardiac failure at age 69.

Following the deaths of Maestro and Ferrara, original member Joe Ruvio returned, and the group recruited new lead singer Roy Michaels. Michaels was replaced by Joe Esposito in 2013.

On May 9, 2012, Johnny Maestro was honored by the House of Representatives of the United States of America. Congressman Jerrold Nadler of New York, whose district includes the neighborhood where Maestro was born and raised, and where he began his music career, introduced an Extension of Remarks in the House of Representatives. In June 2012, a 40th Anniversary DVD was released by the Brooklyn Bridge. The DVD included a full concert and interviews with group members, recorded on May 6, 2006 (38 years after the group formed).

Original member Arthur J Catanzarita Sr. died October 12, 2014.

Les Cauchi died unexpectedly on March 3, 2020, in Greensboro, North Carolina, at the age of 77.

Esposito left in 2025 and was replaced by Ed Gaudio.

Michael W. Gregorio died on July 14, 2025.

Carolyn Wood died on February 4, 2026, a month before her 80th birthday.

== Discography ==
See The Brooklyn Bridge discography for a complete discography.

== Line-ups ==
Original

- Johnny Maestro – vocals
- Les Cauchi – backing vocals
- Fred Ferrara – backing vocals
- Mike Gregorio – backing vocals
- Tom Sullivan – musical director
- Carolyn Wood – keyboardist
- Richie Macioce – guitarist
- Jimmy Rosica – bassist
- Shelly Davis – trumpeter
- Joe Ruvio – saxophonist
- Tony Trombino – drums
- Artie Catanzarita – drums
- Rick Solomon – bassist (fill-in for Richie Macioce due to illness)
- Ben Sudano – bassist (fill-in for Richie Macioce due to illness)

Current

- Jimmy Rosica – bassist & vocals
- Joe Ruvio – vocals
- Ed Gaudio – vocals
- Marty D'Amico – keyboards
- Jim Sarle – guitarist
- Lou Agiesta – drummer
