= Art Garfunkel discography =

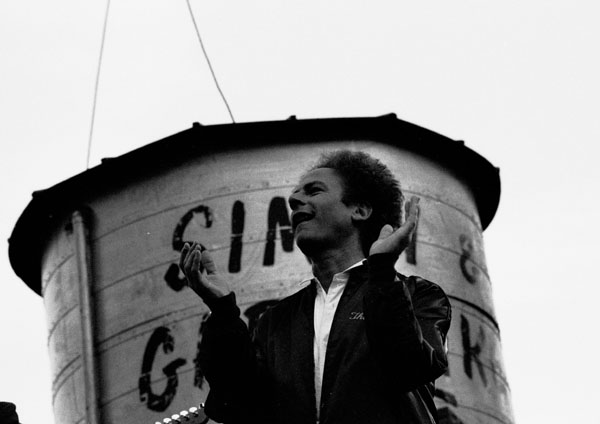
- Art Garfunkel in a concert in Dublin, Ireland
- Studio albums: 10
- Live albums: 1
- Compilation albums: 8
- Singles: 29
- Music videos: 5

Art Garfunkel is an American singer, best known for participating with Paul Simon in the folk rock duo Simon & Garfunkel. In a career spanning over 60 years, Garfunkel released 10 studio albums, one live album, four compilation albums and 29 singles.

To date, Garfunkel has had three US top 40 albums and six UK top 40 Albums, with two in the top 10, respectively. As a solo artist, he also hit the top ten on the US Billboard Hot 100 singles chart in 1973 with the song "All I Know."

== Albums ==
=== Studio albums ===
Year	Album details	Peak chart positions										Certifications
Year	Album details	US	AUS	CAN	GER	JPN	NLD	NOR	NZL	SWE	UK	Certifications
1973	Angel Clare: Released: September 1973; Label: Columbia	5	14	6	—	7	—	20	—	4	14	RIAA: Gold; MC: Gold; BPI: Silver
1975	Breakaway: Released: October 1975; Label: Columbia	7	26	6	—	21	16	18	31	21	7	RIAA: Platinum; BPI: Gold
1977	Watermark: Released: October 1977; Label: Columbia	19	41	15	—	37	—	11	18	—	25	RIAA: Gold; MC: Gold; BPI: Silver
1979	Fate for Breakfast: Released: March 15, 1979; Label: Columbia	67	3	66	6	66	1	9	1	7	2	BPI: Platinum
1981	Scissors Cut: Released: August 1981; Label: Columbia	113	70	—	—	23	15	9	—	18	51	
1986	The Animals' Christmas (with Amy Grant): Released: January 12, 1986; Label: Columbia	—	—	—	—	—	—	—	—	—	—	
1988	Lefty: Released: April 1988; Label: Columbia	134	—	—	—	66	—	—	—	26	—	
1997	Songs from a Parent to a Child: Released: June 3, 1997; Label: Columbia	—	—	—	26	—	—	—	—	—	—	
2002	Everything Waits to Be Noticed (with Maia Sharp and Buddy Mondlock): Released: October 8, 2002; Label: Blue Note/Manhattan	—	—	—	—	—	—	—	—	—	—	
2007	Some Enchanted Evening: Released: January 30, 2007; Label: Atco	—	—	—	—	—	—	—	—	—	82	
"—" denotes releases that did not chart or was not released

=== Compilation albums ===
Year	Album details	Peak chart positions							Certifications
Year	Album details	US	AUS	GER	JPN	NLD	NOR	UK	Certifications
1984	The Art Garfunkel Album: Released: December 1984; Label: Columbia	—	99	—	44	34	—	12	BPI: Gold
1984	My Best (German market edition of The Art Garfunkel Album): Released: 1984; Label: CBS	—	—	4	—	—	—	—	
1988	Garfunkel: Released: May 1988; Label: Columbia	—	—	—	—	—	—	—	
1993	Up 'til Now: Released: October 28, 1993; Label: Columbia	—	—	—	—	—	—	—	
1998	Simply the Best: Released: May 1998; Label: Columbia	—	—	—	—	—	—	—	BPI: Silver
2001	The Best of Art Garfunkel: Released: March 19, 2001; Label: Sony	—	—	—	—	—	—	—	
2010	Playlist: The Very Best Of: Released: June 2010; Label: Columbia	—	—	—	—	—	—	—	
2011	Bright Eyes: The Very Best Of: Label: Sony	—	—	—	—	—	—	—	
2012	The Singer: Released: August 28, 2012; Label: Columbia / Legacy	179	—	—	165	—	37	10	BPI: Gold
	"—" denotes releases that did not chart or was not released								

=== Live albums ===
Year	Album details	Peak chart positions					Certifications
Year	Album details	AUT	GER	NLD	NOR	UK	Certifications
1996	Across America: Released: December 1996; Label: Virgin, Hybrid	42	27	17	17	35	BPI: Silver

== Singles ==
Year	Title 'A' / Title 'B'	Album	Chart positions								
Year	Title 'A' / Title 'B'	Album	US Hot 100	US AC	AUS	IRE	NZ	SA	UK	CAN	CAN AC
1959	"Beat Love" / "Dream Alone"	Non-album singles, released under the name Artie Garr	–	–	–	–	–	–	–	–	–
1961	"Forgive Me" / "Private World"	Non-album singles, released under the name Artie Garr	—	–	–	–	–	–	–	–	–
1973	"All I Know" / "Mary Was an Only Child"	Angel Clare	9	1	36	–	17	–	–	7	1
1973	"I Shall Sing" / "Feuilles-Oh/Do Space Men Pass Dead Souls on Their Way to the Moon?"	Angel Clare	38	4	84	–	16	8	51 (Note: Chart position is from the official UK "Breakers List".)	12	–
1974	"Traveling Boy" / "Old Man"	Angel Clare	—	30	–	–	–	–	54	65	–
1974	"Second Avenue" / "Woyaya"	Single only	34	6	89	–	–	–	–	39	–
1975	"I Only Have Eyes for You" / "Looking for the Right One"	Breakaway	18	1	28	2	-	11	1	8	1
1975	"My Little Town" (With Paul Simon) / "Rag Doll"	Breakaway	9	1	46	–	24	–	–	2	9
1975	"Break Away" / "Disney Girls"	Breakaway	39	1	–	–	–	–	58	28	2
1975	"I Believe (When I Fall in Love It Will Be Forever)" / "Same Old Tears on a New Background"	Breakaway	–	–	–	–	–	–	57	–	–
1976	"Woyaya" / "Down in the Willow Garden"	Angel Clare	–	-	–	–	–	–	–	–	–
1977	"Crying in My Sleep" / "Mr. Shuck 'N' Jive"	Watermark	–	25	–	–	–	–	–	–	95
1978	"Wonderful World" (With Paul Simon and James Taylor) / "Wooden Planes"	Watermark	17	1	47	–	–	–	–	13	–
1978	"Marionette" / "Someone Else"	Watermark	–	–	–	–	–	–	–	–	18
1979	"In a Little While (I'll Be On My Way)" / "And I Know"	Fate for Breakfast	–	12	–	–	–	–	–	–	–
1979	"Since I Don't Have You" / "When Someone Doesn't Want You"	Fate for Breakfast	53	5	–	–	–	–	48	38	–
1979	"Bright Eyes" / "When Someone Doesn't Want You"	Fate for Breakfast	–	29	2	1	–	15	1	–	–
1981	"A Heart in New York" / "Is This Love"	Scissors Cut	66	10	–	–	–	–	–	–	–
1981	"Scissors Cut" / "In Cars"	Scissors Cut	–	–	–	–	–	–	–	–	–
1981	"Hang On In" / "Up in the World"	Scissors Cut	–	–	–	–	–	–	–	–	–
1981	"The Romance" / "Bright Eyes"	Scissors Cut	–	–	–	–	–	–	–	–	–
1984	"Sometimes When I'm Dreaming" / "The Decree"	The Art Garfunkel Album / The Animals' Christmas	–	-	96	–	–	–	77	–	–
1986	"The Decree" / "Carol of the Birds" (with Amy Grant)	The Animals' Christmas	–	–	–	–	–	–	–	–	–
1988	"So Much in Love" / "King of Tonga"	Lefty	–	11	–	–	–	–	–	–	–
1988	"When a Man Loves a Woman" / "I Have a Love"	Lefty	–	–	–	–	–	–	–	–	–
1988	"This Is the Moment" / "Slow Breakup"	Lefty	–	–	–	–	–	–	–	–	–
1994	"Crying in the Rain" (With James Taylor)	Up 'til Now	–	–	–	–	–	–	–	61	25
1996	"Grateful" (Live) / "I Will"	Across America	–	–	–	–	–	–	–	–	–
1997	"Daydream" /	Songs from a Parent to a Child	–	34	–	–	–	–	17	–	9
2002	"Bounce" /	Everything Waits to be Noticed	–	30	–	–	–	–	–	–	–

== Soundtrack appearances ==
- 1989 – Sing, "We'll Never Say Goodbye"
- 1992 – A League of Their Own, "Two Sleepy People"
- 1998 – As Good as It Gets, "Always Look on the Bright Side of Life"
- 1998 – Arthur and Friends: The First Almost Real Not Live CD (or Tape), "The Ballad of Buster Baxter"

== Music videos ==
Year	Title	Director	Album
1981	"A Heart in New York"	Terry Bedford	Scissors Cut
1981	"Scissors Cut"	Terry Bedford	Scissors Cut
1988	"So Much in Love"	Unknown	Lefty
2024	"Time After Time" (with Art Garfunkel Jr.)	Unknown	Father and Son
2024	"Blue Moon" (with Art Garfunkel Jr.)	Unknown	Father and Son
