= Up 'til Now =

Compilation album by Art Garfunkel
- Released: Oct 28, 1993
- Recorded: May 1964-Aug 1993
- Length: 42:14
- Label: Columbia

Art Garfunkel chronology
Garfunkel (1988)	Up 'til Now (1993)	Across America (1997)

Up 'til Now is the third compilation album by Art Garfunkel. The album is a mixture of three previously released solo tracks (including a track from The Animals' Christmas), seven new songs (including a duet with James Taylor and a track from an earlier recording session left off the Scissors Cut album), and two alternate takes of previously released songs. It also includes the acoustic version of Simon & Garfunkel's "The Sounds of Silence", taken from the duo's 1964 debut, Wednesday Morning, 3 A.M.. It was released in 1993 on Columbia Records. The album failed to chart.

The track "The Breakup" is a mock-up news flash of Art Garfunkel giving a serious philosophical reason for the duo's break-up, with Simon continuously interrupting him, in an effort, as Garfunkel put it, "To be like Nichols and May... hoping people won't take the break-up of Simon and Garfunkel seriously."

== Track listing ==
1. "Crying in the Rain" (Carole King, Howard Greenfield) (Duet with James Taylor. Produced by Don Grolnick and Taylor) – 3:39
2. "All I Know" (Jimmy Webb) (Alternate recording from 1989, with Jimmy Webb on piano. Original version appears on 1973 album “Angel Clare”.) – 2:25
3. "Just Over the Brooklyn Bridge" (Marvin Hamlisch, Alan Bergman, Marilyn Bergman) (theme for the CBS series Brooklyn Bridge) – 1:07
4. "The Sound of Silence" (Paul Simon) (from the Simon & Garfunkel album Wednesday Morning, 3 A.M.) – 3:06
5. "The Breakup" (Spoken word with Paul Simon) – 2:16
6. "Skywriter" (Webb) (Recorded live at the Royal Albert Hall with Nicky Hopkins on piano) – 4:15
7. "The Decree" (Webb) (from the album The Animals' Christmas) – 3:31
8. "It's All in the Game" (Carl Sigman, Charles Dawes) – 3:52
9. "One Less Holiday" (Stephen Bishop) (From the Scissors Cut sessions) – 1:47
10. "Since I Don't Have You" (Jimmy Beaumont, Joseph Rock) (From the album Fate for Breakfast) – 3:38
11. "Two Sleepy People" (Hoagy Carmichael, Frank Loesser) (from the Penny Marshall film, A League of Their Own) – 3:38
12. "Why Worry" (Mark Knopfler) – 5:33
13. "All My Love's Laughter" (Webb) (Alternate recording from 1989, original version appears on 1977 “Watermark” album) – 3:27
14. "O Come, All Ye Faithful" (Japanese Bonus Track) - 2:09
