= Laurie Bird =

American actress and photographer (1953–1979)

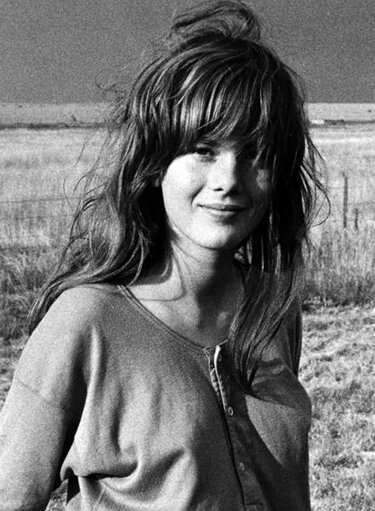
- Bird in 1971
- Born: September 26, 1953; Glen Cove, New York, U.S.
- Died: June 15, 1979 (aged 25); New York City, U.S.
- Burial place: Flushing Cemetery, Queens, New York City; 40°45′6″N 73°47′58″W
- Other name: Lauri Bird
- Occupations: Actress; photographer

Laurie Bird (September 26, 1953 – June 15, 1979) was an American actress and photographer. She appeared in three films during the 1970s, two of which were directed by Monte Hellman. She was romantically involved with Hellman and Art Garfunkel, dying by suicide in the latter's apartment by taking an overdose of Valium.

== Early life ==
Bird's mother died by suicide when Bird was a baby. Her father was an electrical engineer. She had two older brothers. Her father restricted her social life and she fled home multiple times. In response, he placed her in an institution for troubled girls. She attended Jamaica High School, in New York City, until she was 15.

== Career ==
Described by Hollywood columnist Dick Kleiner as "look[ing] like an innocent Hayley Mills", Bird appeared in just three films: Two-Lane Blacktop (1971), Cockfighter (1974), and a small role as girlfriend to Paul Simon's character in the romantic comedy Annie Hall (1977). While researching for Two-Lane Blacktop, screenwriter Rudolph Wurlitzer met her and recommended her to Hellman while he was looking for actresses for the same movie. In Two-Lane Blacktop she played a hitchhiker to whom the film's characters are initially attracted, but who runs off with a motorcyclist near the end of the film.

In 2012, the film was selected for preservation in the United States National Film Registry by the Library of Congress. Her second release, Cockfighter, had her paired opposite Warren Oates. He loses her in a bet. Film critic Michael Atkinson wrote in his book Exile Hollywood (2008) "In two films, she made more of an impression, left more of a synaesthetic presence, than many actors do in a career".

Bird was the still photographer on Cockfighter and shot the cover photo for Art Garfunkel's 1977 album Watermark. She appeared on the cover of Garfunkel's 1975 album Breakaway.

== Personal life ==
She was romantically involved with her Blacktop and Cockfighter director Monte Hellman. From 1974 until her death in 1979, Bird was in a serious romantic relationship with Art Garfunkel.

== Death ==
In 1979, Bird died by suicide by taking an overdose of Valium in the New York apartment she shared with Garfunkel, who was deeply affected by her death. Garfunkel said, "She was beautiful, in a lonesome, haunted way, and I adored her. But I wasn't ready for marriage and she was not very comfortable being Laurie. She wasn't happy with herself. Her mother committed suicide at 26, and so did she."

== Legacy ==
Garfunkel's second solo studio album Breakaway (1975), features Bird on the cover.

Garfunkel's fifth solo studio album Scissors Cut (1981) states in its credits that it was "dedicated to you, Bird", and carried a partial photograph of her on its back cover.

Bird's relationship with Garfunkel was referred to in the liner notes of the latter's 1988 album Lefty and his collection of prose poems Still Water. Hellman dedicated his 2010 film Road to Nowhere to Laurie Bird.

Tim Kinsella's novel Let Go and Go On and On (2014) is subtitled Based on the roles of Laurie Bird. In the foreword, he writes, "This book by no means intends to convey any "truth" beyond one possible solution to the puzzles of her life and work."

Natural Snow Buildings named one of their many 2008 releases Laurie Bird.

== Credits ==
Title	Year	Role	Director(s)	Notes	Ref(s)
Two-Lane Blacktop	1971	The Girl	Monte Hellman	also uncredited performer: "Stealin'", "Satisfaction"	
Cockfighter	1974	Dody White	Monte Hellman	Also credited as still photographer	
Annie Hall	1977	Tony Lacey's Girlfriend	Woody Allen	Credited as Lauri Bird	

== Bibliography ==
- Atkinson, Michael (2008). Exile Cinema: Filmmakers at Work beyond Hollywood. Albany, New York: SUNY Press. ISBN 978-0-7914-7861-5. OCLC 878707252.
- Compo, Susan A. (2009). Warren Oates: A Wild Life. Lexington, Kentucky: University Press of Kentucky. ISBN 978-0-8131-7332-0. JSTOR j.ctt2jcdjb. OCLC 642464853.
