= Fine Upstanding Citizen =

Upstanding Citizen

Studio album by Maia Sharp
- Released: March 22, 2005
- Genre: Pop/rock
- Label: Koch
- Producer: Mark Addison, Brad Jones, Maia Sharp, Randy Sharp

Maia Sharp chronology
Maia Sharp (2002)	Upstanding Citizen (2005)	Echo (2009)

Fine Upstanding Citizen is a 2005 album by American singer-songwriter Maia Sharp.

== Reception ==
Writing for Allmusic, Thom Jurek gave the album three and a half stars out of five. He said that it "won't set the charts on fire" but called it "a mature mark from an under-the-radar artist". He cited the track "Fall Like Margarite" as a highlight, calling it "simply gorgeous." Ronni Radner of Out called the album "an impressive set of thoughtfully crafted songs" and said that it "pays a definite homage to [...] trailblazing femme troubadours" like Bonnie Raitt, Rickie Lee Jones and Carole King.

== Track listing ==
1. "Red Dress" (Richey, Sharp) – 4:02
2. "Something Wild" (Dulaney, Sharp) – 3:57
3. "A Home" (Sharp, Sharp) – 4:37
4. "The Reminder" (Fisher, Sharp) – 3:56
5. "Regular Jane" (Majors, Sharp) – 3:37
6. "Flood" (Robin, Sharp) – 2:30
7. "Kinder Blues" (Addison, Sharp) – 5:06
8. "Firefly" (Poltz, Sharp) – 3:19
9. "Wisdom" (Crowley, Sharp) – 3:21
10. "Fall Like Margarite" (Middleman, Sharp) – 2:50
11. "Come Back to Me" (Batteau, Sharp) – 4:09
12. "Fine Upstanding Citizen" (Coppola, Rowe, Sharp) – 2:18

== Personnel ==
Music

- Mark Addison – bass, mandolin, piano, electric guitar, melodica, Indian banjo
- David Batteau – acoustic guitar
- Chris Carmichael – violin, viola
- Andy Georges – acoustic guitar, banjo, harmonica, mandolin, electric guitar
- Mickey Grimm – percussion, drums
- David Henry – cello
- Brad Jones – organ, acoustic guitar, bass, mandolin, piano, bass guitar, harmonium, timpani, vibraphone, nylon string guitar
- Richard Julian – backing vocals
- Will Kimbrough – percussion, electric guitar, backing vocals
- Ronnie Manaog – percussion, drums, tambourine, shaker
- Greg Morrow – drums
- Kim Richey – backing vocals
- Janet Robin – acoustic guitar, electric guitar
- Joshua Segal – violin, viola
- Maia Sharp – acoustic guitar, clarinet, flute, electric guitar, piano, saxophone, djembe, vocals
- Randy Sharp – acoustic guitar, mandolin, backing vocals, bass harmonica
- Nina Singh – percussion, drums
- Jill Sobule – voices
- Josef Zimmerman – bass, bass guitar

Production

- Mark Addison – producer, sampling, loop
- Tom Briggs – creative director
- Jeff Chenault – creative director
- Jim DeMain – mastering
- Jeremy Ferguson – engineer
- Andy Georges – sampling
- Brad Jones – producer, engineer, sampling, mixing, audio production
- Bonnie Raitt – author
- Maia Sharp – producer, engineer, audio production
- Randy Sharp – producer, engineer, sampling

Design

- Jeff Chenault – art direction, design
- Donna Gast – make-up, hair stylist
- Zoe Joeright – stylist
- Mitch Tobias – photography, composite
