= Not Coming to a Theater Near You =

Film-review website for lesser-known films

- Website type: Film criticism
- Website: www.notcoming.com
- Launched: 2001
- Current status: Active

Not Coming to a Theater Near You is a film review website. As its name suggests, the site shies away from new releases in favor of retrospective looks at older, lesser-known films.

== History ==
Not Coming to a Theater Near You was founded as a printed column in 1998 and has been online-only since 2001. Since 2009, Not Coming to a Theater Near You has put on public screenings of select films at 92YTribeca in New York City. Stills, an offshoot of the site featuring a different still image from a film every day, was also launched in 2009.

In 2010, Film Comment, the Film Society of Lincoln Center's official journal, counted Not Coming to a Theater Near You as being among the top film criticism sites (alongside Moving Image Source, indieWIRE, Ain't It Cool News, and others), calling it "an ambitious online resource for reevaluations of forgotten and fringe cinema." David Hudson, writing for Mubi's The Auteurs Daily, included the site on a similar best-of list.

On May 14, 2014, Not Coming to a Theater Near You ceased publication.

== Content ==
In addition to standalone reviews, much of the content on Not Coming to a Theater Near You comes in the form of interviews, festival coverage, and features highlighting specific genres and directors. Examples include:

- 31 Days of Horror, a month-long look at horror films, which has taken place annually since October 2004 and is currently in its seventh iteration;
- coverage of the South by Southwest, Sundance, Telluride, Toronto, and New York film festivals;
- interviews with such filmmakers and actors as Thom Andersen, Tommy Wiseau, and Frederick Wiseman;
- and spotlights on directors Michel Gondry, Stanley Kubrick, François Truffaut, Agnès Varda, etc.

In a contributors' poll on the best films of the 2000s, five films received five or more votes (from a total of 14 contributors): Eternal Sunshine of the Spotless Mind, In the Mood for Love, Mulholland Drive, There Will Be Blood, and Zodiac.
