= I Shall Sing =

Single by Art Garfunkel

from the album Angel Clare
- B-side: "Feuilles-Oh / Do Space Men Pass Dead Souls On Their Way To The Moon?"
- Released: 1973
- Genre: Soft rock
- Length: 3:36
- Label: Columbia
- Songwriter: Van Morrison
- Producers: Art Garfunkel and Roy Halee

Art Garfunkel singles chronology
""All I Know”" (1973)	"I Shall Sing" (1973)	"“Traveling Boy”" (1973)

"I Shall Sing" is a song written by Northern Irish singer-songwriter Van Morrison. Morrison recorded it as part of the Moondance album sessions, but did not initially release the track. It was released on CD in 2013. The song was also recorded by Art Garfunkel for his debut solo album, Angel Clare, released by Columbia Records in 1973. It was released as the second single from the album, peaking at No. 4 on the Billboard Adult Contemporary chart and No. 38 on the Billboard Hot 100.

The song has also been recorded by several notable artists including Miriam Makeba (1970), Hortense Ellis (1971), Boney M. (1981), King Sounds (1988), Judy Mowatt & The Gaytones (1974), Toots and the Maytals on their 1976 album Reggae Got Soul, and Marcia Griffiths (1993).

== Chart performance ==
Chart (1974)	Peak position
New Zealand (Listener)	16
US Billboard Hot 100	38
US Adult Contemporary (Billboard)	4
