= While We're Young (1943 song) =

Song
- Released: 1943
- Genre: pop, big band
- Songwriters: Alec Wilder, Morty Palitz, Bill Engvick

"While We're Young" is a 1943 song with music composed by Alec Wilder and Morty Palitz, to lyrics by Bill Engvick, which was popularized by Don Cherry, Tony Bennett and other artists. Wilder quoted his Algonquin neighbour, James Thurber, as saying that Engvick's lyrics to "While We're Young" was "the finest piece of English writing he knew". The lyric Thurber refers to begins:

We must fulfill This golden time When hearts awake So shyly, Softly.
Songs were made to sing While we're young. Ev'ry day is spring While we're young...

== Other recordings ==
- Peggy Lee on Rendezvous with Peggy Lee (1949)
- Tony Bennett, B-side to Hank Williams' "Cold, Cold Heart" (1951), and also from debut album Because of You (1952)
- Single by Don Cherry (1951)
- Perry Como with Mitchell Ayres and His Orchestra (1952) and re-recorded for the album For the Young at Heart (1960)
- Judy Garland on Miss Show Business (1955)
- Percy Faith and His Orchestra with Mitch Miller – It's So Peaceful in the Country 3×7″ EP set (1956)
- Rosemary Clooney – Sings Songs for the Young at Heart EP (1956)
- Johnny Mathis on his 1957 Warm LP and 1958 While We're Young EP
- Mike Douglas, B-side to "Here's to My Jenny" (1966)
- Art Garfunkel – Some Enchanted Evening (2007)
