= Simply the Best =

Simply the Best may refer to:

== Music ==
- Simply the Best (Art Garfunkel album), 1998
- Simply the Best (Crystal Lewis album)
- Simply the Best (Tina Turner album), 1991
- "The Best" (song), also known as "Simply the Best", a 1988 song recorded by Bonnie Tyler and later covered by Tina Turner
- "Simply the Best" (song), 2022
- Simply the Best, a 2006 mixtape by Scorcher
- "Simply the Best", from the television series Schitt's Creek, covered by Noah Reid

== Other uses ==
- Simply the Best (game show), a British game show
