= Some Enchanted Evening (Art Garfunkel album) =

Studio album by Art Garfunkel
- Released: January 30, 2007
- Studio: Westlake Studios and Cherokee Studios (Hollywood, California); Reagan's Garage (Los Angeles, California); The Cutting Room (New York City, New York)
- Genre: Jazz, easy listening, pop standards
- Length: 40:55
- Label: Atco
- Producer: Richard Perry

Art Garfunkel chronology
Everything Waits to Be Noticed (2002)	Some Enchanted Evening (2007)

Some Enchanted Evening is the tenth solo studio album by Art Garfunkel, released in 2007. It is Garfunkel's interpretation of many standards of the Great American Songbook. It was produced by long-time friend and producer Richard Perry.

== Track listing ==
1. "I Remember You" (Johnny Mercer, Victor Schertzinger) – 2:58
2. "Someone to Watch Over Me" (George Gershwin, Ira Gershwin) – 3:24
3. "Let's Fall in Love" (Harold Arlen, Ted Koehler) – 2:28
4. "I'm Glad There Is You" (Jimmy Dorsey, Paul Madeira) – 3:45
5. "Quiet Nights of Quiet Stars (Corcovado)" (Antonio Carlos Jobim, Gene Lees) – 3:03
6. "Easy Living" (Leo Robin, Ralph Rainger) – 3:38
7. "I've Grown Accustomed to Her Face" (Alan Jay Lerner, Frederick Loewe) – 2:49
8. "You Stepped Out of a Dream" (Gus Kahn, Nacio Herb Brown) – 2:46
9. "Some Enchanted Evening" (Richard Rodgers, Oscar Hammerstein II) – 3:35
10. "It Could Happen to You" (Johnny Burke, Jimmy Van Heusen) – 2:31
11. "Life Is But a Dream" (Raoul Cita, Hy Weiss) – 3:44
12. "What'll I Do" (Irving Berlin) – 3:04
13. "If I Loved You" (Richard Rodgers, Oscar Hammerstein II) – 3:10
14. "While We're Young" (Alec Wilder, Bill Engvick, Morty Palitz) – 3:42 [Bonus track from Target - exclusive edition]

== Personnel ==
=== Musicians ===
- Art Garfunkel – vocals
- Michael Thompson – Rhodes electric piano (1, 4, 5, 11), synth strings (1, 2, 5–7, 10, 12, 13), synth pad (3), guitars (5, 8), keyboards (7, 8), Wurlitzer electric piano (10), additional keyboards (11), vibraphone (11)
- Alex Navarro – synth strings (2, 4–6, 10, 12, 13), additional synth strings (7, 9), keyboards (8), acoustic piano (10–13), synth bass (11)
- Randy Kerber – synth keyboards (4), additional synth strings (4), bass (4), drum programming (4), keyboards (7, 9), synth strings (7), synth bass (9)
- Dean Parks – guitars (1–3, 6–12), pedal steel guitar (6)
- Frank Simes – guitar solo (2), guitars (13)
- Bob Glaub – bass (1–3, 6–8, 10)
- Nicklas Sample – bass (5), drum programming (5, 8), percussion (8)
- Chris Golden – bass (12, 13)
- Steve Gadd – drums (1–3, 5–7, 10–12)
- Bobby Ginsburg – drum programming (5, 8), percussion (8)
- Michael Montilla – percussion (9)
- Chris Smith – harmonica solo (1)
- Doug Webb – soprano sax solo (1, 10), flute solo (5), woodwinds (6), clarinet solo (6), tenor sax solo (8)
- Maia Sharp – tenor sax solo (3)
- Lee Thornburg – trumpet solo (4)
- Richard Perry – bass vocal (11)

=== Production ===
- Richard Perry – producer, mixing
- Lauren Wild – co-producer
- Bobby Ginsburg – recording, mixing
- Dylan Margerum – additional engineer, additional recording
- Geoff Phurrough – additional engineer, additional recording
- Dee Robb – additional recording
- Stephen Marcussen – mastering at Marcussen Mastering (Hollywood, California)
- Ben McCarthy – production coordinator
- Shauna Krikorian – administration assistance
- Bridget Nolan – project coordinator
- Kevin Gore – project supervision
- Robin Hurley – project supervision
- Lisa Liese – project manager
- Kenny Nemes – project manager
- Hugh Brown – art direction
- Maria Villar – design
- Jeff Katz – photography
- John Scher for Metropolitan Management – management
