= The Art Garfunkel Album =

Greatest hits album by Art Garfunkel
- Released: December 4, 1984
- Recorded: 1973–1984
- Genre: Soft rock
- Length: 51:14
- Label: Columbia
- Producer: Roy Halee, Richard Perry, Jimmy Webb, Art Garfunkel, Mike Batt

Art Garfunkel chronology
| Scissors Cut (1981) | The Art Garfunkel Album (1984) | The Animals' Christmas (1986) |

Professional ratings
Review scores
| Source | Rating |
|---|---|
| Allmusic | 2/5 stars |

The Art Garfunkel Album (re-titled My Best in Germany) is the first compilation album by Art Garfunkel, released in 1984. It contained thirteen of his greatest hits from the first eleven years of his solo career as well as new single, "Sometimes When I'm Dreaming".

== Track listing ==
1. "Bright Eyes" (Mike Batt) - 3:56
2. "Break Away" (Benny Gallagher, Graham Lyle) - 3:35
3. "A Heart in New York" (Benny Gallagher, Graham Lyle) - 3:11
4. "I Shall Sing" (Van Morrison) - 3:31
5. "99 Miles From L.A." (Albert Hammond, Hal David) - 3:30
6. "All I Know" (Jimmy Webb) - 3:43
7. "(What a) Wonderful World" (Herb Alpert, Sam Cooke, Lou Adler) - 3:29
8. "I Only Have Eyes for You" (Al Dubin, Harry Warren) – 3:38
9. "Watermark" (Jimmy Webb) - 2:59
10. "I Believe (When I Fall in Love It Will Be Forever)" (Stevie Wonder, Yvonne Wright) – 3:48
11. "Scissors Cut" (Jimmy Webb) - 3:52
12. "Sometimes When I'm Dreaming" (Mike Batt) 3:35
13. "Traveling Boy" (Paul Williams, Roger Nichols) – 3:42
14. "The Same Old Tears On a New Background" (Stephen Bishop) – 3:45

== Charts ==
=== Weekly charts ===
| Chart (1984/85) | Peak position |
|---|---|
| Australia (Kent Music Report) | 90 |
| Dutch Mega Albums Chart | 34 |
| UK Albums Chart | 12 |
| West German Media Control Albums Chart | 4 |

=== Year-end charts ===
| Chart (1984) | Position |
|---|---|
| UK Albums Chart | 41 |

== Certifications ==
| Region | Certification | Certified units/sales |
|---|---|---|
| United Kingdom (BPI) | Gold | 100,000^{^} |
^{^} Shipments figures based on certification alone.
