= Maia Sharp (album) =

Studio album by Maia Sharp
- Released: June 11, 2002
- Genre: Pop/rock
- Label: Concord Jazz
- Producer: Mark Addison, Maia Sharp, Randy Sharp

Maia Sharp chronology
| Hardly Glamour (1997) | Maia Sharp (2002) | Fine Upstanding Citizen (2005) |

Maia Sharp is a 2002 album by American singer-songwriter Maia Sharp. It was released on the Concord Jazz label and produced by Sharp, her father Randy Sharp, and Mark Addison. Randy Sharp co-wrote the track "Crimes of the Witness".

== Reception ==
Writing for Allmusic, Ronnie D. Lankford, Jr. gave the album four stars out of five. He praised the songs' "strong sense of melody" as well as the album's musical arrangements and lyrics. He cited the track "One Good Reason" as a highlight, calling it "achingly beautiful". He called the album as a whole "a fine batch of songs, [...] fresh and pleasing."

== Track listing ==
1. "Crimes of the Witness" (Sharp, Sharp) — 3:15
2. "Willing to Burn" (December, James, Sharp) — 3:55
3. "Long Way Home" (Sharp) — 4:32
4. "Sinners" (Georges, Sharp) — 4:08
5. "Crooked Crown" (Batteau, Sharp) — 3:53
6. "Lightning" (Rose, Sharp) — 4:23
7. "One Good Reason" (Ashton, Sharp) — 4:00
8. "Happiness" (Robin, Sharp) — 3:36
9. "Understudies" (Mondlock, Sharp) — 3:43
10. "Your Own Justice" (Sharp) — 4:13
11. "You Can't Lose Them All" (Richey, Sharp, Thorn) — 3:44
12. "Ghosts" (Sharp, Sharp) — 0:52
