= Simply the Best (Art Garfunkel album) =

Compilation album by Art Garfunkel
- Released: May 12, 1998
- Recorded: 1973–1998
- Genre: Pop
- Length: 75:19
- Label: Columbia
- Producer: Richard Perry, Roy Halee, Jimmy Webb, Art Garfunkel

Art Garfunkel chronology
Songs from a Parent to a Child (1997)	Simply the Best (1998)	Everything Waits to Be Noticed (2002)

Simply the Best is the fourth compilation album by Art Garfunkel. It was released in 1998. The album features the majority of his hit songs. This compilation has also been released in Australia as “The Best of Art Garfunkel”. The album failed to chart.

== Track listing ==
1. "Bright Eyes" (Mike Batt) – 3:56
2. "Break Away" (Benny Gallagher, Graham Lyle) – 3:35
3. "I Believe (When I Fall in Love It Will Be Forever)" (Stevie Wonder, Yvonne Wright) – 3:48
4. "Disney Girls" (Bruce Johnston) – 4:32
5. "Miss You Nights" (Dave Townsend) – 3:45
6. "She Moved Through the Fair" (Jimmy Webb, Paddy Moloney) - 3:44
7. "Scissors Cut" (Jimmy Webb) – 3:52
8. "Since I Don't Have You" (Joseph Rock, Jimmy Beaumont, Lenny Martin) – 3:38
9. "Watermark" (Jimmy Webb) - 2:53
10. "(What a) Wonderful World" (Herb Alpert, Sam Cooke, Lou Adler) - 3:29
11. "When a Man Loves a Woman" (Calvin Lewis / Andrew Wright) - 4:29
12. "Looking for the Right One" (Stephen Bishop) – 3:21
13. "I Only Have Eyes for You" (Al Dubin, Harry Warren) – 3:38
14. "Crying in the Rain" (Carole King, Howard Greenfield) - 3:39
15. "Another Lullaby" (Jimmy Webb) – 3:30
16. "99 Miles from L.A." (Albert Hammond, Hal David) – 3:30
17. "A Heart in New York" (Benny Gallagher, Graham Lyle) – 3:11
18. "Saturday Suit" (Jimmy Webb)- 3:17
19. "Why Worry" (Mark Knopfler) - 5:33
20. "Crying in My Sleep" (Jimmy Webb)- 3:58
