= Garfunkel (album) =

Compilation album by Art Garfunkel
- Released: May 3, 1988
- Recorded: 1973–1988
- Genre: Pop
- Length: 43:05
- Label: CBS
- Producer: Art Garfunkel, Roy Halee, Richard Perry, Geoff Emerick, Mike Batt, Jay Graydon

Art Garfunkel chronology
Lefty (1988)	Garfunkel (1988)	Up 'til Now (1993)

Garfunkel is the second compilation album by Art Garfunkel, released in 1988. The album features some of Garfunkel's hit songs. The album also contains the 1974 non-album single A-Side "Second Avenue". The album failed to chart.

== Track listing ==
1. "When a Man Loves a Woman" (Calvin Lewis, Andrew Wright) - 4:30
2. "Break Away" (Benny Gallagher, Graham Lyle) –3:31
3. "Bright Eyes" (Mike Batt) –3:55
4. "(What a) Wonderful World" (Herb Alpert, Sam Cooke, Lou Adler) - 3:29
5. "All I Know" (Jimmy Webb) –3:48
6. "Scissors Cut" (Webb) –3:52
7. "I Only Have Eyes for You" (Al Dubin, Harry Warren) –3:40
8. "So Much in Love" (George Williams, Bill Jackson, Roy Straigis) - 2:24
9. "99 Miles from L.A." (Albert Hammond, Hal David) –3:28
10. "Second Avenue" (Tim Moore) - 2:46
11. "A Heart in New York" (Gallagher, Lyle) –3:10
12. "I Have a Love" (Stephen Sondheim, Leonard Bernstein) - 4:29
