= Randy Sharp =

American singer-songwriter

Randy Sharp is an American, three time Grammy Award winning singer/songwriter, guitarist and producer. He has major success in many genre of music with his greatest successes in Pop, Country, and Alternative. He has composed for film and television as well. Over the past 40 years Sharp has been signed as an artist to major record labels as well as producing in the Pop, Alternative and Country genres. His songs have been recorded by artists including Linda Ronstadt, Art Garfunkel, Blood Sweat and Tears, Delaney Bramlett, Glen Campbell, Exile, Anne Murray, Restless Heart, Reba McEntire, Alabama, The Oak Ridge Boys, Holly Dunn, Tanya Tucker, Edgar Winter, Clay Walker, Kathy Mattea, Dixie Chicks, Kenny Rogers, and Emmylou Harris, as well as his daughter, singer-songwriter-artist Maia Sharp.

As a writer Sharp's publishing associations have been Gee Sharp Music/Albert Hall Music in the 1970s, Warner Brothers Music Publishing in the 1980s and his own With Any Luck Music which he opened in 1988 which became part of Wind Swept Pacificin 1995. As an artist he has been signed to major label contracts including RCA Equinox Records, Mercury Records and Nautilus Records. He was given the honor of recording a direct to disc project. That project included Pop/Rock legendary bands such as Toto, backing him for the live studio limited release recording, which he produced with Doug Gilmore.

In the 1990s, Sharp contributed to the Speechless movie soundtrack as well as Follow That Bird soundtrack in the 1980s for which he won a Grammy Award. His production credits include Exile’s Still Standing and Justice albums for Arista Records, Maia Sharp's debut album Hardly Glamour as well as her self-titled follow up album Maia Sharp. He also produced his own duet album for Mercury Records with Karen Brooks entitled That's Another Story (1992).

Currently he has repurchased some of the With Any Luck Music/Randy Sharp Music Publishing titles, and is well on his way to building With Any Luck Music Publishing and Randy Sharp Music Publishing boasting of more than 700 songs to their credit.

Most recently he has written and produced in his Los Angeles Kaweah Recording Studios and for his With Any Luck Music Publishing/Randy Sharp Music Publishing. Randy and Dave Kinnoin have just released a children's album entitled "Calling All The Elephants" which has received wonderful reviews from John Wood and a First All Star Endorsement from Kids First Music.

== Bibliography ==
- Randy Sharp Finally Makes a 'Connection' on 33rd Street
