= Songs from a Parent to a Child =

Studio album by Art Garfunkel
- Released: June 3, 1997
- Recorded: 1997
- Studio: Sony Music Studios (Santa Monica, California); Quad Recording Studios (New York City, New York)
- Genre: Folk
- Length: 36:01
- Label: Columbia
- Producer: Art Garfunkel; Billy Preston (Track 7); Merry Clayton (Track 7)

Art Garfunkel chronology
Across America (1997)	Songs from a Parent to a Child (1997)	Simply The Best (1998)

Professional ratings
Review scores
Source	Rating
Allmusic	3/5 stars

Songs from a Parent to a Child is the eighth solo studio album by Art Garfunkel and his first new studio release since Lefty nine years earlier. Released as a concept album in 1997, it features his son, wife and a host of celebrity musicians, and was built on the concept of children's songs. The cover photograph was taken by Douglas Foulke on Bow Bridge, Central Park, New York City. The album received a Grammy nomination for Best Musical Album for Children.

== Track listing ==
1. "Who's Gonna Shoe Your Pretty Little Feet?" (Traditional) - 1:51
2. "Morning Has Broken" (Eleanor Farjeon) - 2:53
3. "Daydream" (John Sebastian) - 2:44
4. "Baby Mine" (Ned Washington, Frank Churchill) - 3:39
5. "Secret O' Life" (James Taylor) – 3:36
6. "The Things We've Handed Down" (Marc Cohn) - 4:37
7. "You're A Wonderful One" (Holland–Dozier–Holland) - 3:12
8. "Good Luck Charm" (Aaron Schroeder, Wally Gold) - 2:26
9. "I Will" (John Lennon, Paul McCartney) – 2:17
10. "Lasso The Moon" (Billy Simon, Lowell Alexander) - 3:28
11. "Dreamland" (Mary Chapin Carpenter) - 3:10
12. "Who's Gonna Shoe Your Pretty Little Feet? (Reprise)" (Traditional) - 1:41
13. "The Lord's Prayer / Now I Lay Me Down to Sleep" (Albert Hay Malotte/Traditional) - 3:52

== Personnel ==
- Art Garfunkel – vocals
- Billy Preston – acoustic piano (2, 7), organ (7)
- Warren Bernhardt – Fender Rhodes (4), Hammond C3 organ (6), keyboards (11)
- John Barlow Jarvis – keyboards (9)
- Jimmy Webb – acoustic piano (10), Fender Rhodes (13), organ (13)
- Eric Weissberg – guitars (1, 11, 12), banjo (3), dobro (3, 4), acoustic guitar (5, 8), mandolin (11)
- John Sebastian – guitars (2), harmonica (3), whistling (3)
- Jeff Mironov – electric guitar (5, 8)
- Dean Parks – guitars (6)
- Stuart Breed – nylon guitar (6)
- Tony Maiden – guitars (7)
- Jeff Jones – guitars (9)
- Leland Sklar – bass (4, 6, 9)
- Mark Egan – bass (5, 8)
- Freddie Washington – bass (7)
- Steve Gadd – drums (3, 4, 6, 11)
- Chris Parker – drums (5, 8)
- Bill Maxwell – drums (7)
- Russ Kunkel – drums (13)
- Dave Samuels – bass marimba (4)
- Paulinho da Costa – percussion (5, 7)
- Rafael Padilla – percussion (9)
- Curtis Amy – saxophone solo (7)
- Dan Higgins – flute (9)
- Lisa Edelstein – flute (9)
- Joseph Stone – oboe (9), English horn (11, 13)
- Bob McChesney – trombone (7)
- Oscar Brashear – trumpet (7)
- Matthew McCauley – string arrangements (2, 10, 11, 13), woodwind arrangements (9), synthesizers (13), horn arrangements (13)
- Kim Cermak Garfunkel – vocals (1, 12)
- Merry Clayton – backing vocals (7, 13), BGV arrangements (7, 13)
- Julia Tillman Waters – backing vocals (7, 13)
- Maxine Waters – backing vocals (7, 13)
- James Garfunkel – vocals (8)

=== Production ===
- Becky Mancuso-Winding – executive producer
- Art Garfunkel – producer (1–6, 8–13), mixing
- Billy Preston – producer (7)
- Merry Clayton – producer (7)
- Stuart Breed – recording, mixing
- Claude Achille – assistant engineer
- Chuck Habeck – assistant engineer
- Ron Boustead – digital editing
- Stephen Marcussen – mastering at Precision Mastering (Hollywood, California)
- Hillary Bratton – A&R coordinator
- Howard Fritzson – art direction, design
- Douglas Foulke – photography
- Randall Tang – hair, make-up
- Rob Kos and Bridget Nolan for Metropolitan Entertainment Grouo – management
