= Across America (album) =

Live album by Art Garfunkel
- Released: May 27, 1996
- Recorded: April 12–13, 1996
- Venue: The Registry Hall, Ellis Island, New York
- Genre: Pop
- Length: 50:01 (US): 53.11 (UK)
- Label: Hybrid Recordings
- Producer: Art Garfunkel & Stuart Breed

Art Garfunkel chronology
Up 'til Now (1993)	Across America (1996)	Songs from a Parent to a Child (1997)

Across America is the only live album by American singer Art Garfunkel. It is the only official live recording he has released to date. The album was recorded live over two evenings - 12 and 13 April 1996 in The Registry Hall at Ellis Island, New York.

It was released to celebrate the ending of his 12-year Walk Across America. The U.K. version of the album contains the additional track "I Only Have Eyes For You".

A 2-disc, 19 track version was released as a freebie in the U.K. via The Mail On Sunday newspaper as The Very Best of Art Garfunkel Across America that includes the 17 tracks listed below in a slightly different order with two additional tracks: "America" and "Cecilia".

== Reception ==
The Allmusic review by Stephen Thomas Erlewine awarded the album 2 stars stating "Art Garfunkel returned to recording in 1997 with Across America, a live album intended to commemorate his walk across America. Composed largely of oldies, the record is a pleasant enough nostalgia trip, but it doesn't have enough distinguished performances (a version of "The 59th Street Bridge Song" sung with his six-year-old son is notable, but it certainly isn't accomplished) to make the record a worthy addition even to the collections of devoted fans. ".

Professional ratings
Review scores
Source	Rating
Allmusic	2/5 stars

== Track listing ==
1. "A Heart in New York" (Benny Gallagher, Graham Lyle) – 3:25
2. "Crying in the Rain" with James Taylor (Carole King, Howard Greenfield) – 2:03
3. "Scarborough Fair/Canticle" (Traditional, arranged by Paul Simon, Art Garfunkel) – 3:19
4. "A Poem on the Underground Wall" (Paul Simon) – 2:08
5. "I Only Have Eyes For You" (Harry Warren, Al Dubin) (UK version only) – 3:10
6. "Homeward Bound" (Paul Simon) - 2:58
7. "All I Know" (Jimmy Webb) – 3:12
8. "Bright Eyes" (Mike Batt) – 4:22
9. "El Condor Pasa (If I Could)" (Paul Simon, Daniel Alomía Robles) - 3:22
10. "Bridge over Troubled Water" (Paul Simon) – 4:43
11. "Mrs. Robinson" (Paul Simon) – 3:21
12. "The 59th Street Bridge Song" with James Garfunkel (Paul Simon) – 1:43
13. "I Will" (Lennon/McCartney) – 2:16
14. "April Come She Will" (Paul Simon) – 2:17
15. "The Sound Of Silence" (Paul Simon) – 3:27
16. "Grateful" (John Bucchino) – 4:49
17. "Goodnight My Love" (George Motola, John Marascalco) – 2:36

== Personnel ==
- Art Garfunkel – Vocals
- Eric Weissberg – Guitar, Mandolin, Bass
- Warren Bernhardt – Piano, Rhodes, Synthesizer
- David Biglin – Synthesizer, Vocals
- Tommy Igoe – Drums, Percussion
- Kim Cermak – Vocals
- Michael Brecker – Tenor Saxophone
- James Garfunkel – Vocals
- James Taylor – Vocals, Guitar

== Charts ==
=== Weekly charts ===
Chart (1996–97)	Peak position
Austrian Albums (Ö3 Austria)	42
Dutch Albums (Album Top 100)	17
German Albums (Offizielle Top 100)	27
Norwegian Albums (VG-lista)	17
UK Albums (OCC)	35

=== Year-end charts ===
Chart (1997)	Position
Dutch Albums (Album Top 100)	82
