= Everything Waits to Be Noticed =

Everything Waits to be Noticed

Studio album by Art Garfunkel with Maia Sharp & Buddy Mondlock
- Released: October 8, 2002
- Studio: OmniSound Studios (Nashville, Tennessee)
- Genre: Pop; easy listening
- Length: 51:05
- Label: Blue Note
- Producer: Billy Mann

Art Garfunkel with Maia Sharp & Buddy Mondlock chronology
Simply the Best (1997)	Everything Waits to be Noticed (2002)	Some Enchanted Evening (2007)

Everything Waits to be Noticed is the ninth solo studio album by Art Garfunkel, a collaboration with singer-songwriters Maia Sharp and Buddy Mondlock. Credited to "Art Garfunkel With Maia Sharp & Buddy Mondlock", the album is Garfunkel's debut as a songwriter, co-writing six songs, and was produced by Billy Mann. It is his first release on Blue Note Records after years of recording for Columbia Records. The album failed to chart.

== Track listing ==
1. "Bounce" (Graham Lyle, Billy Mann) – 3:33
2. "The Thread" (Art Garfunkel, Buddy Mondlock, Maia Sharp) – 4:18
3. "The Kid" (Mondlock) – 4:27
4. "Crossing Lines" (Gary Burr, Dan Haseltine, Sharp) – 3:37
5. "Everything Waits to Be Noticed" (Garfunkel, Mondlock, Sharp) – 3:12
6. "Young and Free" (Richard Julian) – 3:41
7. "Perfect Moment" (Garfunkel, Mondlock, Pierce Pettis) – 3:59
8. "Turn, Don't Turn Away" (Garfunkel, Mann, Mondlock) – 5:02
9. "Wishbone" (Garfunkel, Mann, Mondlock) – 3:35
10. "How Did You Know?" (Garfunkel, Mann, Sharp) – 4:24
11. "What I Love About Rain" (Lisa Aschmann, Tom Kimmel) – 3:35
12. "Every Now and Then" (Garth Brooks, Mondlock) – 3:18
13. "Another Only One" (Sharp, Christopher Faizi) – 4:16
14. "Perfect Moment" (Acoustic Version, Japan only) – 3:57

== Personnel ==
- Art Garfunkel – lead vocals
- Buddy Mondlock – lead vocals, acoustic guitar (2, 3, 5, 7, 11, 12)
- Maia Sharp – lead vocals, soprano saxophone (2, 7–9, 11), clarinet (3)
- Tony Harrell – keyboards (1–4, 6–13), accordion (3, 6)
- George Marinelli – electric guitar (1, 7–11)
- Larry Beaird – acoustic guitar (1, 3, 4, 6–9, 11–13), banjo (6), electric guitar (7), mandolin (9, 11)
- Billy Mann – acoustic guitar (1, 8, 9, 13), backing vocals (9)
- Jeff King – electric guitar (2–4, 6, 13), mandolin (4)
- Mark Hill – bass (1–4, 6–13)
- Shannon Forrest – drums (1, 7–10), percussion (10)
- Steve Brewster – drums (3, 4, 6, 11, 13)
- Eric Darken – percussion (2–4, 6, 11, 12)
- Bob Mason – cello (3, 5, 13)
- Carole Rabinowitz – cello (13)
- Jim Grosjean – viola (5, 13)
- Kristin Wilkinson – viola (5, 13)
- Carl Gorodetzky – violin (5, 13)
- Pamela Sixfin – violin (5, 13)
- Conni Ellisor – violin (13)
- Lee Larrison – violin (13)
- Alan Umstead – violin (13)
- Carl Marsh – cello arrangements (3), string arrangements (5, 13)

=== Production ===
- Billy Mann – producer
- Herb Tassin – engineer
- Joey Turner – assistant engineer
- George Massenburg – mixing
- Bob Ludwig – mastering at Gateway Mastering (Portland, Maine)
- Josh Gold – project manager
- Gordon H. Jee – creative director
- Burton Yount – art direction
- Friederike Paetzold – art direction, package design
- Andrew Eccles – photography
- Randall Tang – stylist
- Jann Wenner – liner notes
- Bob Doyle & Associates – management
- Metropolitan Talent – management
- Simonson Management – management
- dbManagement – management
