= Exile Cinema =

2009 book by Michael Atkinson

Exile Cinema: Filmmakers at Work beyond Hollywood
- Author: Michael Atkinson
- Language: English
- Genre: Non-fiction
- Publisher: SUNY Press
- Publication date: 2009
- Publication place: United States

Exile Cinema: Filmmakers at Work beyond Hollywood is a 2009 non-fiction book authored by film critic Michael Atkinson and published by the SUNY Press.
