= Scissors Cut =

Studio album by Art Garfunkel
- Released: August 25, 1981
- Recorded: October 1980 – May 1981
- Studio: Mediasound Studios (New York City, New York); Wally Heider Studios (Hollywood, California); Sound Mixers (Los Angeles, California); Criteria Studios (Miami, Florida)
- Genre: Pop
- Length: 32:10
- Label: Columbia
- Producer: Roy Halee; Art Garfunkel; (except "Bright Eyes" produced by Mike Batt)

Art Garfunkel chronology
Fate for Breakfast (1979)	Scissors Cut (1981)	The Art Garfunkel Album (1984)

Professional ratings
Review scores
Source	Rating
AllMusic	2/5 stars
The Rolling Stone Album Guide	1.5/5 stars

Scissors Cut is the fifth solo studio album by Art Garfunkel. It was released in August 1981 on Columbia Records; it was his second album to miss the US Billboard top 40 (charting at 113) and his second album to contain no US top 40 singles. In the month following its release, Garfunkel reunited with former partner Paul Simon for their famous 1981 Concert in Central Park.

== History ==
In August 1981, Garfunkel released his fifth solo album Scissors Cut (US No. 113, UK No. 51). This album included the Gallagher & Lyle hit "A Heart in New York" (US No. 61). The UK version contains the track "The Romance" rather than "Bright Eyes". The album was co-produced by Roy Halee, who also co-produced the Simon & Garfunkel albums, including Bridge over Troubled Water. Paul Simon makes a brief appearance on "In Cars" performing background vocals. Near the end of the song, Garfunkel sings lines from "Scarborough Fair" – an old English ballad covered by Simon and Garfunkel on the album Parsley, Sage, Rosemary and Thyme). The album is dedicated to his late partner, Laurie Bird, and includes a partial photograph of her on the rear cover.

Garfunkel was devastated by Bird's death in his New York apartment in June 1979 while he was in Europe filming Bad Timing. Garfunkel was quoted at the time, "Laurie was the greatest thing I ever knew in my life, now I've lost it." In 1988, he added: "I took her death terribly and remained moody over it through much of the 80's." He became somewhat of a recluse following the tragedy, and wouldn't release another album until 1986's The Animals' Christmas with Amy Grant.

== Track listing ==
Side one

1. "A Heart in New York" (Benny Gallagher, Graham Lyle) – 3:13
2. "Scissors Cut" (Jimmy Webb) – 3:49
3. "Up in the World" (Clifford T. Ward) – 2:16
4. "Hang On In" (Norman Sallitt) – 3:46
5. "So Easy to Begin" (Jules Shear) – 2:56

Side two

1. "Bright Eyes" (Mike Batt) – 3:55
  (Replaced with "The Romance" on UK/Japan release)
2. "Can't Turn My Heart Away" (John Jarvis, Eric Kaz) – 4:22
3. "The French Waltz" (Adam Mitchell) – 2:12
4. "In Cars" (Jimmy Webb) – 3:47
5. "That's All I've Got to Say (Theme from The Last Unicorn)" (Jimmy Webb) – 1:54

== Charts ==
Chart (1981)	Peak position
Australia (Kent Music Report)	70

== Personnel ==
- Art Garfunkel – vocals
- Rob Mounsey – synthesizers (1, 10)
- Larry Knechtel – keyboards (2–4, 8, 9)
- Michael Boddicker – synthesizers (4, 7, 8)
- John Barlow Jarvis – acoustic piano (7)
- Jimmy Webb – acoustic piano (10)
- Pete Carr – guitars (1, 5, 8, 9)
- Graham Lyle – guitars (1)
- Andrew Gold – guitars (2, 5)
- Dean Parks – guitars (2, 4, 5, 8)
- Michael Staton – guitars (4, 5)
- Jeffrey Staton – guitars (4, 5)
- Chris Spedding – guitars (6)
- Roland Harker – lute (6)
- Tony Levin – bass (1)
- Joe Osborn – bass (2–4, 7–9)
- Scott Chambers – bass (5)
- Les Hurdle – bass (6)
- Russ Kunkel – drums (1)
- Rick Marotta – drums (2, 4, 7–9)
- Rick Shlosser – drums (5)
- Allan Schwartzberg – drums (6)
- Errol "Crusher" Bennett – congas (1, 5), percussion (1, 5)
- Tommy Vig – marimba (5, 9), vibraphone (5, 9)
- Ray Cooper – percussion (6)
- Michael Brecker – tenor saxophone (1)
- Edwin Roxburgh – oboe (6)
- Lew Soloff – flugelhorn (9), trumpet (9)
- Del Newman – string arrangements (2, 7, 10)
- David Campbell – string arrangements (3)
- Teo Macero – string conductor (2, 10)
- Eugene Orloff – concertmaster (2, 10)
- Leah Kunkel – vocals (2, 5, 7, 9)
- Paul Simon – vocals (9)
- Lisa Garber – vocals (10)

"The Romance"

- Larry Knechtel – keyboards
- Pete Carr – guitars
- Dean Parks – guitars
- Joe Osborn – bass
- Rick Marotta – drums
- David Campbell – string arrangements

=== Production ===
- Art Garfunkel – producer (1–5, 7–10)
- Roy Halee – producer (1–5, 7–10), engineer, drum re-recording (6), remixing (6)
- Mike Batt – producer (6)
- Lincoln Clapp – assistant engineer
- Dave Demore – assistant engineer
- Dennis Hetzendorfer – assistant engineer
- Terry Rosiello – assistant mix engineer
- Greg Calbi – mastering at Sterling Sound (New York, NY)
- John Berg – design
- Anthony Loew – cover photography, other photography
- Michael Tannen & Associates – management
