= Michael Atkinson (writer) =

American writer, poet and film critic (born 1962)

- Born: October 19, 1962 (age 64)
- Citizenship: American
- Occupations: Film critic, novelist and teacher
- Writing career
- Subjects: Film and culture
- Notable works: Hemingway Deadlights; Hemingway Cutthroat; One Hundred Children Waiting for a Train; Flickipedia

Michael Atkinson (born October 19, 1962) is an American writer, poet and film critic. His debut novel is Hemingway Deadlights (St. Martin's Press/Minotaur Books, 2009), and he has written widely on film and culture, in Sight & Sound, The Village Voice, The Guardian, Film Comment, The Believer, In These Times, The Criterion Collection, Rolling Stone, The Progressive, Spin, Maxim, The Boston Phoenix, Details, Moving Image Source, IFC.com, TCM.com, The Poetry Foundation, Chicago Reader, LA Weekly, The Stranger, The American Prospect, Baltimore City Paper, Modern Painters, and other publications. In 2026, he published the essay collection This Is How You Fight the Battle for Movies: Diatribes, Hosannas and Wild Talk on the Semi-Lost Craft of Cinephilia, 2001-2026 (Sticking Place Books).

His volume Exile Cinema: Filmmakers at Work Beyond Hollywood (SUNY Press) featured work by Guy Maddin, Stuart Klawans, Ed Park, Jonathan Rosenbaum, Joshua Clover, David Thompson, Howard Hampton, and others.

His debut book of poetry is One Hundred Children Waiting for a Train (Word Works), and his poems have also appeared in a number of journals, including The Threepenny Review, Ontario Review, Chelsea, Michigan Quarterly Review, Prairie Schooner, Epoch, Crazyhorse, Seneca Review, New Letters, Cimarron Review, and The Laurel Review, among others.

Since 1997, Atkinson has taught at Long Island University. Since 2017, he has served as editorial director of the online film school Smashcut.

He has been the recipient of a New York Foundation for the Arts fellowship, and was a featured writer in September 11, 2001: American Writers Respond (ed. William Heyen, Etruscan Press, 2002), The Best American Movie Writing 2001 (John Landis & Jason Shinder, eds., Avalon/Thunder's Mouth Press, 2001), Celluloid Jukebox (Jonathan Romney & Adrian Wooton, eds., British Film Institute, 1997), and The Best American Poetry 1993 (eds. Louise Gluck & David Lehman, Collier/Macmillan, 1993).

Atkinson also co-authored and co-produced the pilots Babylon Fields (2007), produced by 20th Century Fox for NBC, and again in 2014 for CBS.

Atkinson participated in the 2012 Sight & Sound critics' poll, where he listed his ten favorite films as follows: Aguirre, The Wrath of God, L'Atalante, Blue Velvet, Céline and Julie Go Boating, Citizen Kane, Late Spring, A Man Escaped, Pierrot Le Fou, The Rules of the Game, and Sherlock Jr..

== Bibliography ==
- This Is How You Fight the Battle for Movies: Diatribes, Hosannas and Wild Talk on the Semi-Lost Craft of Cinephilia, 2001-2026, Sticking Place Books, New York, 2026.
- Hemingway Cutthroat, St. Martin's Press, New York, 2010.
- Hemingway Deadlights, St. Martin's Press, New York, 2009.
- Exile Cinema: Filmmakers at Work Beyond Hollywood, SUNY Press, Albany, 2008.
- Flickipedia: Perfect Movies for Every Occasion, Holiday, Mood, Ordeal and Whim (co-written with Laurel Shifrin), Chicago Review Press, Chicago, 2007.
- One Hundred Children Waiting for a Train, Word Works, Wash. DC, 2002.
- Ghosts in the Machine: Speculating on the Dark Heart of Pop Cinema, Limelight Eds., New York, 2000.
- Blue Velvet, British Film Institute, London, 1997; new edition, 2021.
