= Angel Clare =

Studio album by Art Garfunkel
- Released: September 11, 1973
- Recorded: 1973
- Studio: Grace Cathedral, San Francisco
- Genres: Soft rock, orchestral pop
- Length: 38:36
- Label: Columbia
- Producers: Art Garfunkel; Roy Halee

Art Garfunkel chronology
Angel Clare (1973)	Breakaway (1975)

Singles from Angel Clare
- 1. "All I Know" Released: 1973; 2. "I Shall Sing" Released: 1973; 3. "Traveling Boy" Released: 1973

Professional ratings
Review scores
Source	Rating
AllMusic	4.5/5 stars
Christgau's Record Guide	C
Rolling Stone	favorable

Angel Clare is the debut solo studio album by Art Garfunkel, released on September 11, 1973. It is his highest-charting solo album in the United States, peaking at No. 5 on the Billboard 200, and includes his only US Top 10 hit as a solo artist, "All I Know". It also contained two other Top 40 hits, "Traveling Boy" (#102 Bubbling under the Hot 100, No. 38 Adult Contemporary) and "I Shall Sing" (No. 38 Hot 100, No. 4 Adult Contemporary). It was produced by long-time Simon & Garfunkel producer Roy Halee, alongside Art Garfunkel.

The title, Angel Clare, comes from the name of a character in Thomas Hardy's novel, Tess of the d'Urbervilles.

== Songs ==
"Traveling Boy" was the third single of the album and the opening track. Written by Paul Williams and Roger Nichols, the song tells the story of a young man heading for the road, leaving a lover behind. The opening track piano riff was made by Larry Knechtel, with J.J. Cale performing the guitar solo. Garfunkel took three takes on the vocal, the first two failing because he couldn't keep his voice loud enough during the first middle eight. Sally Stevens performs the soprano note at the start of the guitar solo.

"Down in the Willow Garden", the second track, was a country classic popularized by singer-songwriter Charlie Monroe, about a young man who kills his lover in the town's willow garden, and the events that follow, from his attempts to hide the body to his father's hypocritical advice and, finally, his own demise. Paul Simon sang harmony on the final verse and chorus with Garfunkel, along with Jerry Garcia of The Grateful Dead playing lead guitar (overdubbed later by Roy Halee in San Francisco). Garfunkel went on to say it was one of his favourite country songs and loved working with Simon again. Garcia, however, was less pleased with the results, referring to his contribution as "an overdub in a sea of overdubs" and expressing his dismay at not having been allowed any improvisational freedom.

The third track, "I Shall Sing", was released as the second single from the album. The calypso based song (which would later be a hit for Boney M), written by Van Morrison, was changed from calypso to a Latin beat by Jim Gordon, with Milt Holland providing the prominent percussion (namely agogo bells, timbales and maracas), Joe Osborn on bass and Jules Broussard performing the saxophone solo, based on an Antônio Carlos Jobim song that he had heard early that year.

"Old Man" was the most controversial track of the album because of Garfunkel's interpretation of the song. Garfunkel himself admitted that he tended, in those days, to listen to the melody before the words and so was quite happy to embed a strong string arrangement and vocal changes. Randy Newman, the song's composer, however, went on to say that he actually loved Garfunkel's version, despite bad press from Rolling Stone magazine. Strings were supplied by Peter Matz, Stuart Canin, Ernie Freeman and Jimmie Haskell, with Garfunkel having arranged the vocals, strings, and instrumentation himself. The highest note of the song, an A5, is also the highest note on the album, on the line "The Birds Have Flown Away."

"Feuilles-Oh/Do Space Men Pass Dead Souls On Their Way to the Moon?" (the fifth track of the album) was a combination of the traditional Haitian folk song with a middle section based on the melody of J.S. Bach's "Christmas Oratorio" Choral N°33. Linda Marie Grossman wrote the lyrics when she was Garfunkel's fiancee. The couple were married at her Nashville home a year earlier (October 1, 1972) but divorced less than two years later (August 1975), with Garfunkel later saying that not only did he not love her, but he did not like her much during their short marriage.

"All I Know", the sixth track of the album, was the first single of the album. The Jimmy Webb composition became Garfunkel's highest US Charting single.

"Woyaya" is a cover of a song by the Afro-pop band Osibisa that was released two years prior.

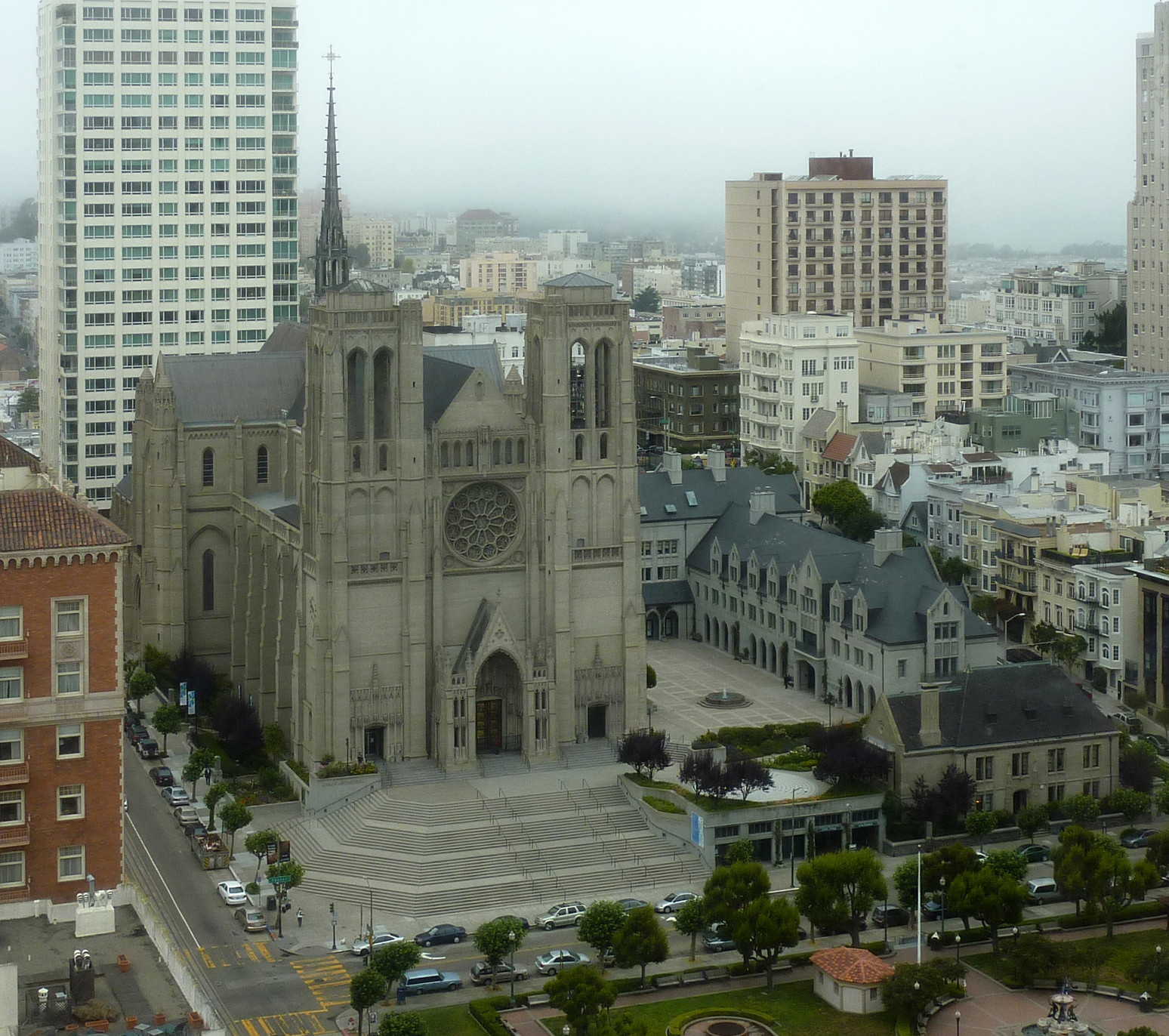
Grace Cathedral, photographed in 2009, where Angel Clare was recorded

Angel Clare was recorded at Grace Cathedral in San Francisco.

== Release history ==
In addition to the usual 2 channel stereo version the album was also released by Columbia Records in 1973 in a 4 channel quadraphonic version on LP record and 8-track tape. The LP version was encoded in the SQ matrix format.

The album was reissued in the UK in 2018 by Dutton Vocalion on the Super Audio CD format. This edition contains both the stereo and quadraphonic mixes.

== Track listing ==
Side A
No.	Title	Writer(s)	Length
1.	"Traveling Boy"	Paul Williams, Roger Nichols	4:55
2.	"Down in the Willow Garden"	Charlie Monroe	3:54
3.	"I Shall Sing"	Van Morrison	3:30
4.	"Old Man"	Randy Newman	3:20
5.	"Feuilles-Oh/Do Space Men Pass Dead Souls on Their Way to the Moon?"	Traditional/Johann Sebastian Bach; lyrics: Linda Grossman	3:07

Side B
No.	Title	Writer(s)	Length
1.	"All I Know"	Jimmy Webb	3:43
2.	"Mary Was An Only Child"	Jorge Milchberg, Albert Hammond, Michael Hazlewood	3:26
3.	"Woyaya"	Sol Amarfio, Osibisa	3:15
4.	"Barbara Allen"	Traditional	5:22
5.	"Another Lullaby"	Jimmy Webb	3:29

== Personnel ==
- Art Garfunkel – lead vocals
- Larry Knechtel – keyboards
- Michael Omartian – keyboards
- J.J. Cale – guitars
- Larry Carlton – guitars
- Fred Carter Jr. – guitars
- Jerry Garcia – guitars
- Dean Parks – guitars
- Louis Shelton – guitars
- Paul Simon – vocals, guitars
- Tommy Tedesco – bouzouki, mandolin
- Jorge Milchberg – charango
- Joe Osborn – bass
- Carl Radle – bass
- Hal Blaine – drums
- Jim Gordon – drums
- Milt Holland – percussion
- Jules Broussard – saxophones
- Jack Schroer – saxophones
- Stuart Canin – violin
- Ernie Freeman – strings
- Jimmie Haskell – strings
- Peter Matz – strings
- Dorothy Combs Morrison – vocals
- Sally Stevens – vocals
- Jackie Ward – vocals
- St Mary's Choir – vocals

=== Production ===
- Art Garfunkel – producer
- Roy Halee – producer, engineer
- Mark Friedman – recording
- Stan Ross – technical assistance
- George Horn – mastering
- Ron Coro – art direction
- Jim Marshall – photography
- Canon Fenstermaker – use of Grace Cathedral

== Charts ==
=== Chart positions ===
Chart	Position
Australia (Kent Music Report)	14
Canadian RPM Albums Chart	6
Japanese Oricon LP Chart	7
Norwegian VG-lista Albums Chart	20
Swedish Albums Chart	4
UK Albums Chart	14
U.S. Billboard 200	5

=== Certifications ===
Region	Certification	Certified units/sales
Canada (Music Canada)	Gold	50,000^{^}
United Kingdom (BPI)	Silver	60,000^{^}
United States (RIAA)	Gold	500,000^{^}
^{^} Shipments figures based on certification alone.
