= Watermark (Art Garfunkel album) =

Studio album by Art Garfunkel
- Released: October 25, 1977; January 10, 1978 (reissue)
- Recorded: 1977
- Studios: Muscle Shoals Sound Studios (Sheffield, Alabama); CBS Studios and A & R Studios (New York City, New York); The Village Recorder (Los Angeles, California); Cherokee Studios (Hollywood, California); Rudy Records (San Francisco, California); Lombard Studios (Dublin, Ireland)
- Genre: Soft rock
- Length: 36:57
- Label: Columbia
- Producer: Art Garfunkel (except "Wonderful World" produced by Phil Ramone)

Art Garfunkel chronology
Breakaway (1975)	Watermark (1977)	Fate for Breakfast (1979)

Singles from Watermark
- 1. "What a Wonderful World" Released: January 1978

Professional ratings
Review scores
Source	Rating
AllMusic	3/5 stars
Rolling Stone	(Positive)

Watermark is the third solo studio album by Art Garfunkel, released in October 1977 on Columbia Records. The first single, "Crying in My Sleep", failed to chart, but the follow-up, a version of "(What a) Wonderful World" (featuring harmony vocals from Garfunkel's old partner Paul Simon and mutual friend James Taylor) reached No. 17 on the Billboard Hot 100 chart and No. 1 on the Adult Contemporary chart. The songs "Watermark" and "Paper Chase" had previously been performed by Richard Harris on his albums A Tramp Shining and The Yard Went On Forever. Watermark is also noted as being the final recording sessions of legendary saxophonist Paul Desmond, who died of lung cancer shortly thereafter. Actress Laurie Bird, Garfunkel's girlfriend, made the album cover's photograph. Some promotional copies of the single "Crying in My Sleep", released in advance of the album, referred to the album as Art Garfunkel, suggesting Garfunkel initially planned for the album to be self-titled.

== Track listing ==
All tracks composed by Jimmy Webb, except where indicated

Side one

1. "Crying in My Sleep" – 4:06
2. "Marionette" – 2:36
3. "Shine It on Me" – 3:26
4. "Watermark" – 2:59
5. "Saturday Suit" – 3:16
6. "All My Love's Laughter" – 3:56

Side two

1. "(What a) Wonderful World" (Herb Alpert, Sam Cooke, Lou Adler) – 3:32 (added to the January 1978 reissue, replacing the song "Fingerpaint")
2. "Mr. Shuck'n Jive" – 4:48
3. "Paper Chase" – 2:37
4. "She Moved Through the Fair" (Traditional) – 2:45
5. "Someone Else (1958)" – 2:19
6. "Fingerpaint" - 3:55 (removed from the January 1978 reissue, replaced with ("What a) Wonderful World")
7. "Wooden Planes" – 3:13

== Personnel ==
- Art Garfunkel – vocals
- Jimmy Webb – keyboards, arrangements (10)
- Barry Beckett – keyboards
- Bill Payne – Oberheim synthesizer
- Pete Carr – guitars
- Jimmy Johnson – electric guitars
- David Hood – bass
- Joe Osborn – bass
- Roger Hawkins – drums
- Tom Roady – percussion
- Tommy Vig – vibraphone
- Paul Desmond – alto saxophone
- Jack Schroer – saxophones, horn arrangements
- Joe Farrell – flute, English horn, oboe
- David Campbell – string arrangements
- Jimmie Haskell – string arrangements
- Stephen Bishop – backing vocals
- David Crosby – backing vocals
- Bob Dorough – vocals, vocal arrangements
- Leah Kunkel – backing vocals

The Chieftains

- Paddy Moloney – Uilleann pipes, tin whistle, musical arrangements, arrangements (10)
- Michael Tubridy – flute
- Martin Fay – fiddle
- Seán Keane – fiddle
- Derek Bell – harp

Musicians for "(What a) Wonderful World"

- Art Garfunkel – vocals
- Paul Simon – vocals, acoustic guitar
- James Taylor – vocals
- Richard Tee – electric piano
- Hugh McCracken – electric guitar
- Tony Levin – bass
- Steve Gadd – drums
- Rick Shlosser – drums
- Craig Krampf – cymbals
- Ralph MacDonald – percussion
- Thomas La Tondre – handclaps
- Chris Dedrick – string arrangements
- The Jay Clayton Voice Group (Jay Clayton, Fred Farell, Carol Flamm, Ed Hasselbrink, Shelley Hirsch, Alexandra Stavrou) – backing vocals
- The Oklahoma Baptist University Chorale – choir
- James D. Woodward – choir master
- Richard Greenberg – choir master assistant

Production

- Art Garfunkel – producer
- Barry Beckett – associate producer
- Steve Melton – engineer
- Bruce Robb – engineer
- Dee Robb – engineer
- Jim Boyer – assistant engineer
- Tony D'Amico – assistant engineer
- Gregg Hamm – assistant engineer
- Richard Leech – assistant engineer
- Doug Sax – mastering at The Mastering Lab (Hollywood, California)
- Laurie Bird – cover photography
- John Berg – art direction, design

"(What a) Wonderful World"

- Phil Ramone – producer
- Baker Bigsby – engineer
- Paul Christensen – engineer
- Fred Meijer – engineer
- Steve Brandon – assistant engineer

== Charts ==
=== Weekly charts ===
Chart	Position
Australia (Kent Music Report)	41
Canada Top Albums/CDs (RPM)	15
New Zealand Albums (RMNZ)	18
Norwegian Albums (VG-lista)	11
UK Albums (Official Charts)	25
US Billboard 200	19

=== Year-end charts ===
Chart (1978)	Position
Canadian Albums Chart	92

=== Certifications ===
Region	Certification
Canada (Music Canada)	Gold
United Kingdom (BPI)	Silver
United States (RIAA)	Gold
