= Moving Image Source =

Moving Image Source is a website of the Museum of the Moving Image (New York City) devoted to the history of film, television, and digital media. Made possible with support from the Hazen Polsky Foundation, it features original articles by leading critics, authors, and scholars; a calendar that highlights major retrospectives, festivals, and gallery exhibitions at venues around the world; and a regularly updated guide to online research resources. Film critic Dennis Lim currently serves as editor-in-chief.

The launch of Moving Image Source was marked by a special program at The Times Center in Manhattan at 6:30 p.m. on June 5, featuring a conversation between directors Werner Herzog (Encounters at the End of the World, opening June 11) and Jonathan Demme (The Silence of the Lambs).

Moving Image Source is updated every Thursday with additions to the Articles and Calendar sections.

== Articles ==
The articles relate to recent and ongoing retrospectives and gallery exhibitions as well as to significant new DVDs and books on film, media, and moving-image culture. Pieces are accompanied by photographs, video clips, and sidebars offering suggestions for further viewing, reading, or listening. June contributors included critics and authors Melissa Anderson, Michael Atkinson, Joshua Clover, Tom Charity, Thomas Doherty, Chris Fujiwara, Ed Halter, B. Kite, Michael Koresky, Rob Nelson, Nick Pinkerton, Tony Rayns, Jonathan Rosenbaum, Dan Sallitt, and Ed Sikov. Topics included the career of Werner Herzog, Wallis-Hazen Productions, a reappraisal of the ’60s films of William Klein, the late Taiwanese filmmaker Edward Yang, video artist Eddo Stern, the late films of Howard Hawks, Japanese actor Tatsuya Nakadai, and the recent restoration of Max Ophüls’s Lola Montès.

== Calendar ==
The Moving Image Source Calendar is a selective guide to major screenings, series, festivals, and gallery exhibitions. Calendar entries include program summaries, exhibition descriptions, titles of films or featured works of media art, and links to presenting venues. The Calendar draws on the programming of more than 100 museums, media arts centers, cinematheques, and other venues around the world that regularly present film and media programs. An international Venue List can be found in the Calendar section: Venues on the list emphasize original programming and the presentation of work in its original format, and/or large-scale gallery exhibitions.

== Research Guide ==
The site's Research Guide is an annotated and regularly maintained database of more than 400 moving-image related resources on the web, ranging from scholarly and popular journals to film-related libraries and archives. They have been organized into a detailed, easy-to-navigate taxonomy with five primary categories: “People,” “History and Styles,” “Industry,” “Technology and Craft,” and “Criticism and Ideas.” The Research Guide may also be browsed by resource type, and advanced search and filtering options are available.
