= Maia Sharp =

American musician

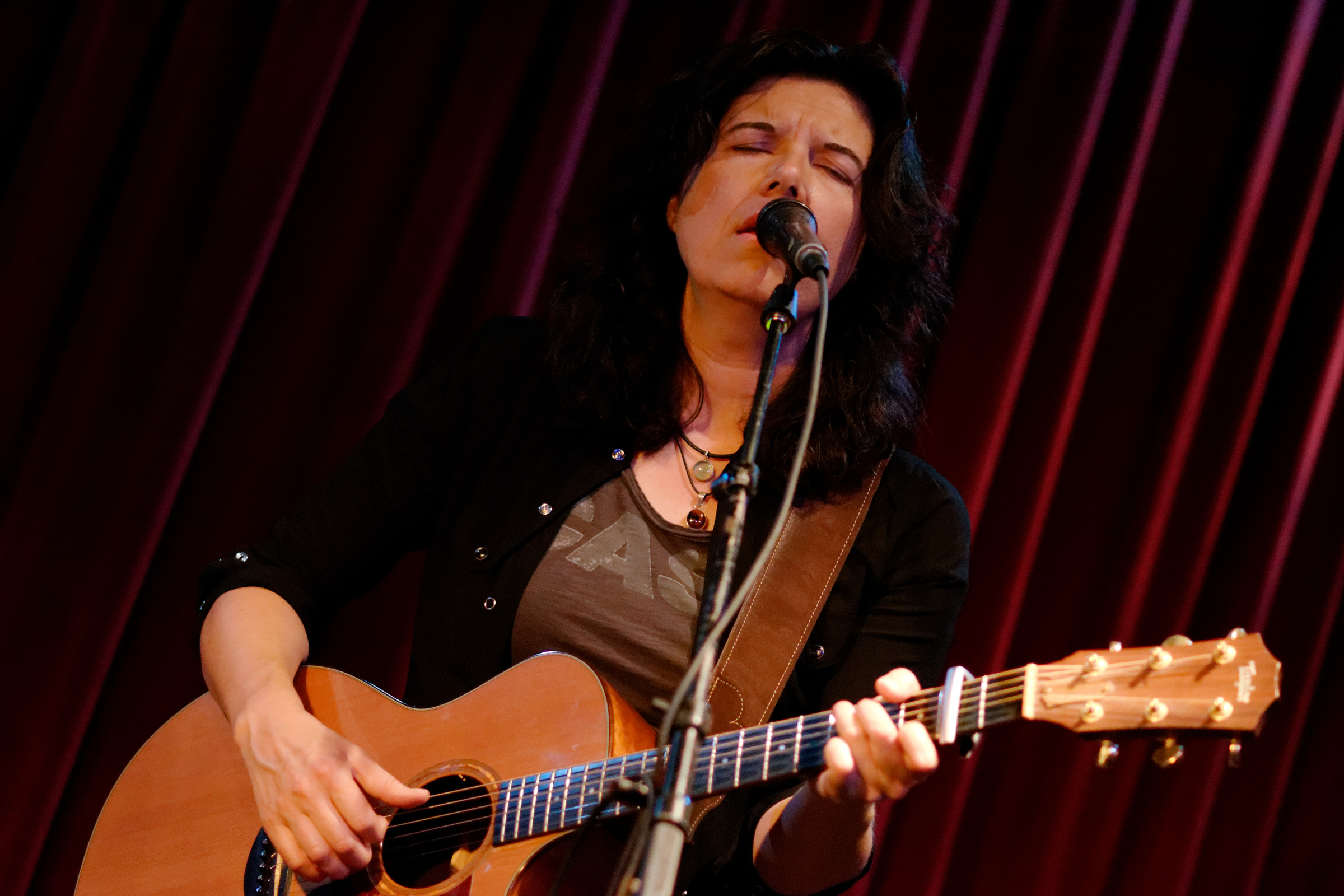

Background information
- Genres: Country, Rock
- Occupation: Singer-songwriter
- Instrument: multi instrumentalist
- Labels: Ark 21; Concord; Koch; Crooked Crown
- Website: maiasharp.com

Maia Sharp is an American singer and songwriter. In addition to her solo career, she has written songs for and collaborated with several country and pop musicians including Cher, Trisha Yearwood, Terri Clark, Bonnie Raitt, Edwin McCain, and Art Garfunkel.

== Early life ==
Sharp was born in the Central Valley in California, the only child of country songwriter Randy Sharp and anthropology professor Sharon Bays. When she was four, the family moved to Los Angeles, and at the age of five she recorded her first song. By the age of twelve she played piano, saxophone, oboe, and guitar, and by her twenties she was performing her jazz/folk songs in L.A. acoustic venues. Musically, she was inspired by Bonnie Raitt, Joni Mitchell, Jackson Browne and Sting. Sharp studied music theory at California State University, Northridge and began to focus on song-writing. She came out as a lesbian at the age of 23.

== Career ==
Sharp played her first gig in 1993. Two years later, she met music executive Miles Copeland and recorded her debut album, Hardly Glamour (1997), on his record label Ark 21. Her next album Tinderbox failed to be released when Ark 21 was incorporated into PolyGram. Three of its songs were featured on Sharp's 2002 album Maia Sharp on Concord. Her 2005 album Fine Upstanding Citizen was released by Koch. 2009's Echo, released by Crooked Crown, is, according to Sharp, her most personal album to date.

During her career, Sharp has collaborated with other musicians including Lisa Loeb, Carole King, Jules Shear and Jonatha Brooke. As a songwriter, her songs have been recorded by musicians including Cher, Kim Richey, Amanda Marshall, Paul Carrack, Edwin McCain, The Dixie Chicks, Trisha Yearwood and Kathy Mattea. She collaborated with Art Garfunkel and Buddy Mondlock on the 2002 album Everything Waits to be Noticed, Garfunkel's debut as a songwriter.

Sharp contributed the track "Castaway" to the album Music from the Aisle of Lesbos, an album featuring various lesbian artists from different genres. In 2009 Sharp opened for Bonnie Raitt on several dates. She started a national concert tour in October 2009.

== Discography ==
=== Solo albums ===
- 1997: Hardly Glamour
- 2002: Maia Sharp
- 2005: Fine Upstanding Citizen
- 2006: Eve and the Red Delicious
- 2009: Echo
- 2012: Change the Ending
- 2015: The Dash Between the Dates
- 2021: Mercy Rising
- 2023: Reckless Thoughts
- 2025: Tomboy

=== Collaborations ===
- 2002: Everything Waits to Be Noticed (with Art Garfunkel and Buddy Mondlock)
