= Fate for Breakfast =

Studio album by Art Garfunkel
- Released: March 15, 1979
- Recorded: 1979
- Studio: A & R Studios, The Hit Factory and Automated Recording Studio (New York City, New York); The Sound Factory (Hollywood, California); Kendun Recorders (Burbank, California); Dawnbreaker Studios (San Fernando, California); AIR Studios, Wessex Sound Studios and Lansdowne Studios (London, UK)
- Genre: Soft rock
- Length: 36:44
- Label: Columbia
- Producer: Louie Shelton (except "Bright Eyes" produced by Mike Batt)

Art Garfunkel chronology
Watermark (1977)	Fate for Breakfast (1979)	Scissors Cut (1981)

Singles from Fate for Breakfast
- 1. "Bright Eyes" Released: 1979

Professional ratings
Review scores
Source	Rating
AllMusic	2/5 stars
Rolling Stone	(Not Favorable)
The Rolling Stone Album Guide	2/5 stars

Fate for Breakfast is the fourth solo studio album by Art Garfunkel, released in March 1979 on Columbia Records.

It was his first album to miss the U.S. Billboard Top 40 (charting at 67) and his first album containing no U.S. Top 40 singles. Yet the album garnered international success, reaching the top-ten in some European countries. The European release includes "Bright Eyes", which was featured in the film version of the novel Watership Down, and reached the number-one spot in the United Kingdom, becoming the biggest-selling single of 1979 there.

The album was issued in six different sleeves, each with a different shot of Art Garfunkel at the breakfast table. David Sanborn covered "And I Know" entitled "Love Will Come Someday" for his 1982 album As We Speak. Also on the album is a cover of Cliff Richard's 1976 hit "Miss You Nights".

== Track listing ==
Side 1
No.	Title	Writer(s)	Length
1.	"In a Little While (I'll Be on My Way)"	Dennis Belfield	3:27
2.	"Since I Don't Have You"	Joe Rock, Jimmy Beaumont, Lennie Martin, Janet Vogel, John Taylor, Joseph Verscharen, Walter Lester	3:39
3.	"And I Know"	Michael Sembello, David Batteau	3:40
4.	"Sail on a Rainbow"	Stephen Bishop	3:45
5.	"Miss You Nights"	Dave Townsend	3:47

Side 2
No.	Title	Writer(s)	Length
6.	"Bright Eyes" (Not included on U.S. album release)	Mike Batt	4:00
7.	"Finally Found a Reason"	Michael Sembello, David Batteau, Craig Bickhardt, Rick Bell	2:41
8.	"Beyond the Tears"	Jeffrey Comanor, Robert Gundry	3:53
9.	"Oh How Happy"	Charles Hatcher	2:41
10.	"When Someone Doesn't Want You"	Jeffrey Staton	3:34
11.	"Take Me Away"	Grant Gullickson, Lance Gullickson	4:04

== Personnel ==
Credits and track numbers taken from US release.

- Art Garfunkel – vocals, harmony vocals
- Rob Mounsey – electric piano (1, 3), synthesizers (1–4, 10), clavinet (1, 7, 10), string arrangements (2), Rhodes electric piano (3, 4, 6–8, 10), acoustic piano (7, 10), Oberheim synthesizer (9)
- Richard Tee – electric piano (2, 9)
- Larry Knechtel – acoustic piano (5)
- Larry Rolando – electric guitar (1, 3, 7, 8), acoustic guitar (4, 10)
- Louis Shelton – electric guitar (1–4, 7, 8, 10), acoustic guitar (6), backing vocals (6)
- Richie Zito – electric guitar (1)
- Hugh McCracken – electric guitar (2, 9)
- Lee Ritenour – electric guitar (7)
- Jeffrey Staton – acoustic guitar (9), backing vocals (9)
- Dennis Belfield – bass (1–4, 6–8, 10)
- Neil Jason – bass (2, 9)
- DeLisle Harper – bass (5)
- Mike Baird – drums (1, 3, 4, 6–8, 10)
- Steve Gadd – drums (2, 9)
- Simon Phillips – drums (5)
- Alan Estes – percussion (1, 7)
- Errol "Crusher" Bennett – percussion (2, 9)
- Steve Forman – percussion (4)
- Michael Brecker – tenor saxophone (2, 9)
- Tom Scott – tenor saxophone (4), horn arrangements (8)
- Del Newman – string arrangements (1, 5, 7, 10)
- Gene Page – basic track arrangements (3, 7)
- Maxi Anderson – backing vocals (1, 8)
- Carolyn Dennis – backing vocals (1, 8)
- Jim Gilstrap – backing vocals (1, 8)
- Billy Alessi – backing vocals (3, 10)
- Bobby Alessi – backing vocals (3, 10)
- Leah Kunkel – backing vocals (3, 4, 6, 10)
- Penny Nichols – backing vocals (4, 6, 10)
- Stephen Bishop – backing vocals (6)

"Bright Eyes"

- Chris Spedding – acoustic guitar
- Roland Harker – lute
- Les Hurdle – bass
- Roy Morgan – drums
- Ray Cooper – percussion
- Edwin Roxburgh – oboe

== Production ==
- Louie Shelton – producer
- Joseph Bogan – basic track engineer (1, 3–8, 10), BGV engineer (3)
- Elliot Scheiner – mix engineer, basic track engineer (2, 9)
- Ed Rakowicz – overdub engineer (1, 3–8, 10)
- Bob Bullock – horn engineer (1, 3–8, 10)
- Mike Stavrou – string and vocal engineer (1, 3–8, 10)
- Ed Sprigg – string engineer (2, 9), percussion overdubs (2, 9)
- Jon Smith – vocal engineer (2, 9), assistant string engineer (2, 9), percussion overdub assistant (2, 9)
- Butch Lynch – basic track assistant (1, 3–8, 10)
- Joe Romersa – basic track assistant (1, 3–8, 10)
- George Yabarra – basic track assistant (1, 3–8, 10)
- K.C. Green – assistant mix engineer (1, 3–8, 10)
- Jim Sintetos – assistant horn engineer (1, 3–8, 10)
- David Woolley – assistant string and vocal engineer (1, 3–8, 10)
- Tom Gretl – basic track assistant (2)
- Leslie Mona – assistant mix engineer (2, 9)
- Marti Jane Robinson – assistant mix engineer (2, 9)
- Tom Cummings – assistant BGV engineer (3)
- John Berg – design
- Edie Baskin – photography
- Franne Lee – photo stylist

"Bright Eyes"

- Mike Batt – producer
- Tim Friese-Greene – engineer
- Mike Thompson – engineer
- Robert Butterworth – mix engineer

== Charts ==
=== Weekly charts ===
Chart (1979)	Position
Australia (Kent Music Report)	3
Austrian Albums Chart	24
Canadian RPM Albums Chart	66
Dutch Mega Albums Chart	1
New Zealand Albums Chart	1
Norwegian VG-lista Albums Chart	9
Swedish Albums Chart	7
Swiss Albums Chart	10
UK Albums Chart	2
U.S. Billboard 200	67
West German Media Control Albums Chart	6

=== Year-end charts ===
Chart (1979)	Position
Australian Albums Chart	24
German Albums (Offizielle Top 100)	28
New Zealand Albums (RMNZ)	13
UK Albums Chart	31

=== Certifications ===
Region	Certification	Certified units/sales
United Kingdom (BPI)	Gold	100,000^{^}
^{^} Shipments figures based on certification alone.
