= Lefty (album) =

Studio album by Art Garfunkel
- Released: March 29, 1988
- Recorded: 1987
- Length: 36:46
- Label: Columbia
- Producer: Geoff Emerick; Art Garfunkel; Jay Graydon; Steve Gadd

Art Garfunkel chronology
The Animals' Christmas (1986)	Lefty (1988)	Garfunkel (1988)

Lefty is the seventh solo studio album by American singer Art Garfunkel, released in 1988. The album features three songs by singer-songwriter Stephen Bishop. The album's cover photo shows a pre-teen Art Garfunkel holding a stickball bat in the front yard of his childhood home in the Forest Hills section of Queens, New York City. It was taken by his brother Jules. The album title came from the fact that Garfunkel is left-handed, which the picture established.

The album failed to make the Top 100 in the US (charting at 134) and hit the bottom half of the UK Top 100. Despite this, it yielded three minor hit singles.

The liner notes of the album contain a brief prose text Garfunkel had written in memory of his partner Laurie Bird who had committed suicide in 1979. The album marked a new beginning in Garfunkel's professional life after becoming somewhat of a recluse following the tragedy.

Professional ratings
Review scores
Source	Rating
Allmusic	link
Philadelphia Inquirer	2/4 stars

== Track listing ==
1. "This Is the Moment" (David Foster, Cynthia Weil, Linda Thompson, Ray Parker Jr.) – 4:31
2. "I Have a Love" (Stephen Sondheim, Leonard Bernstein) – 4:28
3. "So Much in Love" (George Williams, Bill Jackson, Roy Straigis) – 2:24
4. "Slow Breakup" (Stephen Bishop) – 3:46
5. "Love Is the Only Chain" (Mary Ann Kennedy, Pam Rose, Pat Bunch) – 4:07
6. "When a Man Loves a Woman" (Calvin Lewis, Andrew Wright) – 4:30
7. "I Wonder Why" (Bill Lovelady, Marita Phillips, Peter Skellern) – 3:22
8. "King of Tonga" (Bishop) – 3:27
9. "If Love Takes You Away" (Bishop) – 3:47
10. "The Promise" (Nick Holmes) – 3:57

== Personnel ==
- Art Garfunkel – vocals
- Robbie Buchanan – synthesizers (1, 3)
- David Foster – synthesizers (1, 3)
- Jay Graydon – synthesizers (1, 3), guitars (1, 3)
- Gary Chang – Synclavier (1, 3)
- Nicky Hopkins – keyboards (2, 4–10)
- Robert Sabino – synthesizers (2, 4–10)
- Stephen Bishop – Omnichord (2, 4–10), vocals (2, 4–10)
- Steve Lukather – guitars (1, 3)
- Hugh McCracken – guitars (2, 4–10)
- Joe Osborn – electric bass (2, 4–10)
- Eddie Gómez – acoustic bass (2, 4–10)
- Steve Gadd – drums (2, 4–10)
- Michael Brecker – saxophone (2, 4–10)
- Jeremy Steig – flute (2, 4–10)
- Del Newman – brass, woodwinds and strings (2, 4–10)
- Jim Haas – vocals (1, 3)
- Jon Joyce – vocals (1, 3)
- Clif Magness – vocals (1, 3)
- Mary Ann Kennedy – vocals (2, 4–10)
- Leah Kunkel – vocals (2, 4–10)
- Kenny Rankin – vocals (2, 4–10)
- Pam Rose – vocals (2, 4–10)

=== Production ===
- Jay Graydon – producer (1, 3), engineer (1, 3)
- Art Garfunkel – producer (2, 4–7, 9, 10)
- Geoff Emerick – producer (2, 4–7, 9, 10), engineer (2, 4–10)
- Steve Gadd – producer (8)
- Ian Eales – engineer (1, 3)
- Mick Guzauski – engineer (1, 3)
- Stuart Breed – engineer (2, 4–10)
- Ron Lewter – mastering
- Doug Sax – mastering
- The Mastering Lab (Hollywood, California) – mastering location
- Christopher Austopchuk – cover design
- Jules Garfunkel – photography
- Caroline Greyshock – back cover photography
