= The Animals' Christmas =

Studio album by Art Garfunkel and Amy Grant
- Released: October 1986
- Recorded: December 23, 1984 – December 12, 1985
- Venue: St. Paul's Church (Wimbledon, England); Cathedral of St. John the Divine (New York City, New York)
- Studio: CTS Studios (Wembley, London, UK); AIR Studios (Montserrat); The Hit Factory (New York City, New York); Bullet Recording (Nashville, Tennessee)
- Genre: Pop, Christmas music
- Length: 41:27
- Label: Columbia
- Producer: Art Garfunkel; Jimmy Webb; Geoff Emerick

Art Garfunkel chronology
| The Art Garfunkel Album (1984) | The Animals' Christmas (1986) | Lefty (1988) |

Amy Grant chronology
| The Collection (1986) | The Animals' Christmas (1986) | Lead Me On (1988) |

The Animals' Christmas By Jimmy Webb is the sixth solo studio album and the first Christmas album by vocalist Art Garfunkel, and is a collaborative album with Amy Grant, released in October 1986 by Columbia Records. The album was written by Jimmy Webb and features vocals by Garfunkel, Grant, and the Wimbledon King's College Choir.

The Animals' Christmas tells the story of the Nativity of Jesus from the perspective of the animals present. The album received positive reviews, with one writer calling it "one of the best Christmas albums of the '80s." The album failed to chart.

== Background ==
During the early 1980s, Jimmy Webb began writing the songs that would become The Animals' Christmas, based on a children's book about the Nativity of Jesus by Anne Thaxter Eaton. Garfunkel became interested in the project because he felt it was "born out of the love of a musical person to make music." In his 1989 book, Still Water: Prose Poems, Garfunkel wrote about his experience with the project.

In '83, my friend Jimmy Webb showed me a piece he was writing, a cantata for children's choir and small orchestra for his local church in Tuxedo, New York. And it being a noncommercial endeavor, I was particularly interested in it, because I had become cynical about the fact that the record business will professionalize one's musical attempts in a way that can hurt them. And I followed Jimmy's rehearsals in Tuxedo and loved The Animals' Christmas. I told him I wanted to get involved. By the next year, he had written an extension, doubled its length and wrote various sections for me as solo singer, narrator and the angel Gabriel. He added a woman's part—the Virgin Mary. We all performed it with orchestra, children's choir, boy singer, girl singer, at St. John the Divine Cathedral that December in New York, and also at Festival Hall in London. We made a live recording of the shows, which later seemed to me too loose. So we planned to record it in the studio, the following Christmas. I started in London in '85 and recorded the London Symphony Orchestra; we added the choir from Wimbledon that winter; come the spring I was in Montserrat doing my vocals with Geoff Emerick; I traveled to Nashville to get Amy Grant's vocals on the album, then came to New York for some percussion overdubs—Steve Gadd on drums, and others. I had it finished by Christmas of '86, which I gather is when it came out. It's a gothic cathedral of an album; it's very ambitious. It was the type of project that would have been done by papal commission long ago.

== Production ==
The Animals' Christmas was recorded between December 23, 1984, and December 12, 1985. The orchestra was recorded at CTS Studios in Wembley, England. The boys' choir was recorded at St. Paul's Church in Southfields, South-west London, England. Vocals were recorded at Air Studios in Montserrat, West Indies. Amy Grant's vocals were recorded at Bullet Recording in Nashville, Tennessee. The organ was recorded at the Cathedral of St. John the Divine in New York City. Overdubs were recorded at The Hit Factory in New York City.

== Packaging and artwork ==
The original album contained a 12-page booklet with lyrics in four languages: English, Spanish, French, and German. The album cover art was created by Abby Levine.

== Critical reception ==
Professional ratings
Review scores
| Source | Rating |
|---|---|
| AllMusic | 4.5/5 stars |

Writer David A. Milberg called the album "one of the best Christmas albums of the '80s."

== Track listing ==
All songs were written by Jimmy Webb, except where indicated.

1. "The Annunciation" – 2:38
2. "The Creatures of the Field" – 2:31
3. "Just a Simple Little Tune" – 2:54
4. "The Decree" – 3:25
5. "Incredible Phat" – 4:59
6. "The Friendly Beasts" (Traditional, Jimmy Webb) – 3:24
7. "The Song of the Camels" (Elizabeth Coatsworth, Jimmy Webb) – 2:46
8. "Word from an Old Spanish Carol" – 3:41
9. "Carol of the Birds" – 2:00
10. "The Frog" – 5:15
11. "Herod" – 4:21
12. "Wild Geese" – 3:33

== Personnel ==
Music

- Art Garfunkel – vocals
- Amy Grant – vocals
- Jimmy Webb – acoustic piano, all arrangements
- Rob Mounsey – synthesizers
- Paul Halley – organ
- Elliott Randall – electric guitars
- Eric Weissberg – acoustic guitars, banjo
- Joe Osborn – bass guitar
- Steve Gadd – drums
- Gordon Gottlieb – percussion
- George Young – saxophone
- Peter Presser – cello
- London Symphony Orchestra – orchestra
- Carl Davis – orchestra conductor
- Michael Jenkins – choir director
- King's College School Choir – choir
- Stephen Bayly – vocal solos
- Del Costello – vocal solos
- Nicholas Dykes – vocal solos
- Jonathan Jenkins – vocal solos

Production

- Art Garfunkel – producer, remixing
- Jimmy Webb – producer
- Geoff Emerick – producer, engineer, remixing
- Roy Halee – engineer
- Jon Kelly – engineer
- Stuart Breed – assistant engineer, remixing
- Nicole Graham – remixing
- Greg Calbi – mastering at Sterling Sound (New York, NY)
- Christopher Austopchuk – art direction
- Abby Levine (www.abbyart.com) – artist
