= Bright Eyes (song) =

Single by Art Garfunkel

from the album Fate for Breakfast
- B-side: "Kehaar's Theme"
- Released: 19 January 1979
- Length: 4:00
- Label: Columbia
- Songwriter: Mike Batt
- Producer: Mike Batt

Art Garfunkel singles chronology
| "In a Little While (I'll Be on My Way)" (1979) | "Bright Eyes" (1979) | "Since I Don't Have You" (1979) |

"Bright Eyes" is a song written by British songwriter Mike Batt and performed by Art Garfunkel. It was written for the soundtrack of the 1978 British animated adventure drama film Watership Down. The accompaniment was re-orchestrated for the film from its original form as a pop song. The original pop track appears on British and European versions of Garfunkel's 1979 Fate for Breakfast and on the US versions of his 1981 album Scissors Cut. "Bright Eyes" topped the UK Singles Chart for six weeks and became Britain's biggest-selling single of 1979, selling over a million copies. Richard Adams, author of the original novel, is reported to have hated the song. A cover of the song, performed by Stephen Gately, was later used in the Watership Down television series as its theme song.

== Background ==
The song was written, produced and arranged by Mike Batt for Watership Down, with original director John Hubley requesting a song about death. It plays when the rabbit Hazel, the lead character in the film, almost dies after being wounded by a farmer's gun and his little brother Fiver is led to him by the Black Rabbit of Inlé.

When composing the song at his home in Surbiton, Batt wrote the lyrics and melody in approximately one hour, structuring the opening verse around an A-minor chord. Although Art Garfunkel was his first choice to record the track, Batt had assembled a list of alternative vocalists that included Colin Blunstone as his second choice.

The original pop single arrangement of the song was very successful both internationally and in the United Kingdom, staying at number one in the UK Singles Chart for six weeks in 1979, selling over one million copies, becoming the biggest-selling single of the year. In the United States, it failed to reach the Billboard Hot 100. It reached No. 29 on the Billboard Adult Contemporary chart.

== Personnel ==
- Art Garfunkel – vocals
- Mike Batt – arranger producer
- Chris Spedding – acoustic guitar
- Roland Harker – lute guitar
- Les Hurdle – bass guitar
- Roy J. Morgan – drums
- Edwin Roxburgh – oboe
- Ray Cooper – percussion

== Charts ==
=== Weekly charts ===
| Chart (1979) | Peak position |
|---|---|
| Australia (Kent Music Report) | 2 |
| Austria (Ö3 Austria Top 40) | 3 |
| Belgium (Ultratop 50 Flanders) | 1 |
| Netherlands (Dutch Top 40) | 1 |
| Netherlands (Single Top 100) | 1 |
| New Zealand (Recorded Music NZ) | 2 |
| Norway (VG-lista) | 3 |
| Sweden (Sverigetopplistan) | 3 |
| Switzerland (Schweizer Hitparade) | 2 |
| UK Singles (Official Charts) | 1 |
| West Germany (GfK) | 3 |

=== Year-end charts ===
| Chart (1979) | Position |
|---|---|
| Australia (Kent Music Report) | 20 |
| Austria (Ö3 Austria Top 40) | 12 |
| Belgium (Ultratop Flanders) | 5 |
| Netherlands (Dutch Top 40) | 3 |
| Netherlands (Single Top 100) | 1 |
| Switzerland (Schweizer Hitparade) | 3 |
| West Germany (Official German Charts) | 5 |

== In popular culture ==
In 2023, the song featured in the fifth episode of season six of the Netflix anthology series, Black Mirror, titled "Demon 79", which is set in 1979, the year of the song's release. The song serves as the episode's opening and closing theme.

Part of the song is heard in the 2005 stop-motion animated film Wallace & Gromit: The Curse of the Were-Rabbit.

Part of the song appears in the third episode of the first season of the BBC 2 series Small Prophets, broadcast in 2026.

In the second episode of the second series of The League Of Gentlemen (Lust For Royston Vasey) the character 'Pop' sings the hook line (twice) and several references to Watership Down are made.
