= Art Garfunkel =

American singer (born 1941)

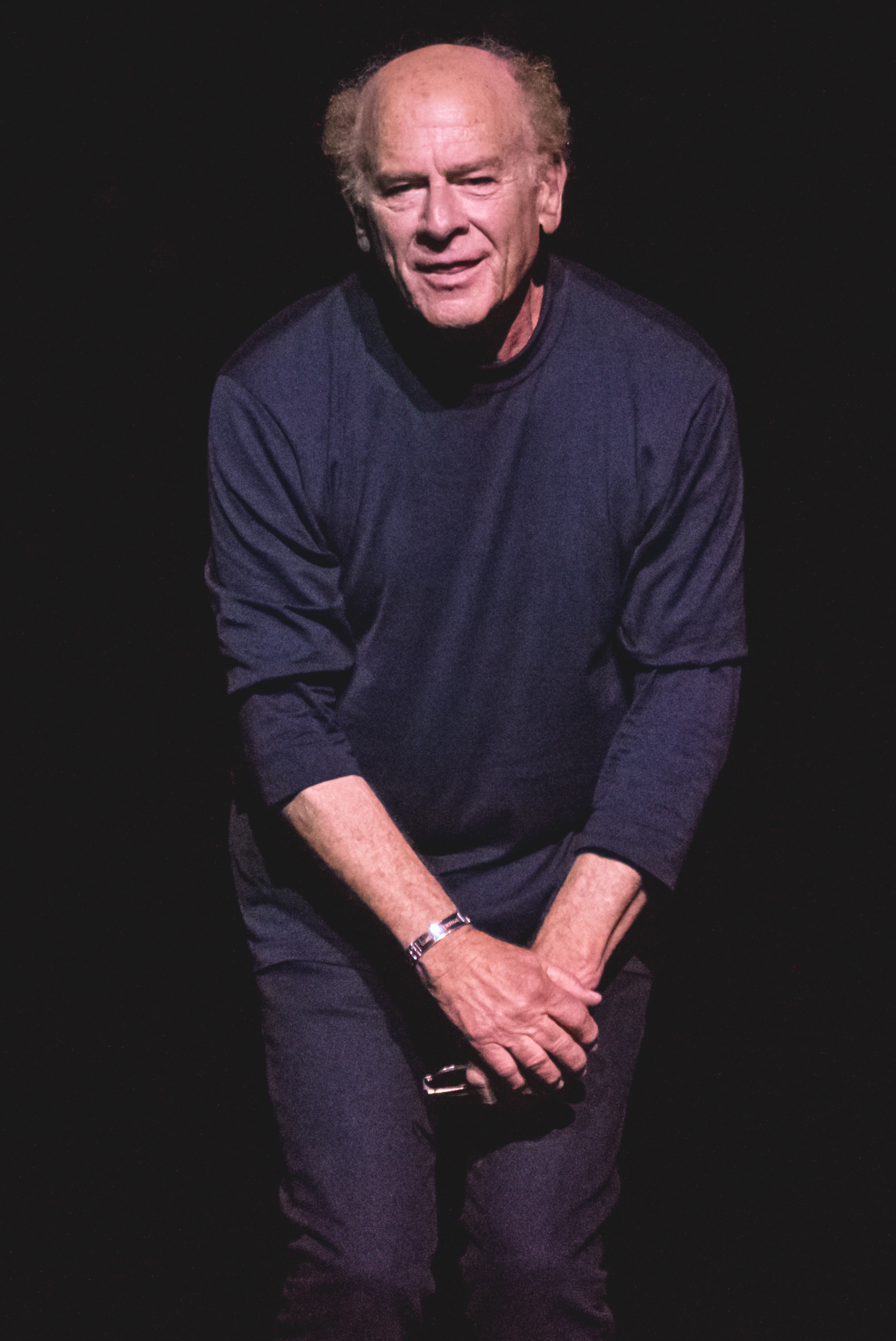
- Garfunkel in 2017

Background information
- Born: Arthur Ira Garfunkel; November 5, 1941 (age 84); New York City, U.S.
- Genres: Folk; rock; pop
- Occupations: Singer; actor; poet
- Instruments: Vocals; percussion
- Years active: 1956–present
- Labels: Columbia; Manhattan; Atco
- Formerly of: Simon & Garfunkel
- Spouses: Linda Grossman (m. 1972; div. 1975) Kathryn Cermak (m. 1988)
- Partner: Laurie Bird (1974–1979)
- Website: artgarfunkel.com

Arthur Ira Garfunkel (born November 5, 1941) is an American singer, actor and poet who is best known for his partnership with Paul Simon in the folk rock duo Simon & Garfunkel.

Born in Forest Hills, Queens, New York, Garfunkel became acquainted with Simon through an elementary school play, a production of Alice in Wonderland. Their combined presence in music began in the 1950s, and throughout the 1960s the duo of Simon & Garfunkel achieved great chart success with tracks such as "The Sound of Silence", "Mrs. Robinson" (written for the 1967 film The Graduate), "Scarborough Fair", "The Boxer" and "Bridge over Troubled Water". The last song's title also served as the name of Simon & Garfunkel's final album in 1970. Simon & Garfunkel split for personal reasons, but the pair have occasionally reunited in the years since. Both experienced success solo in the years following their breakup.

Highlights of Garfunkel's solo music career in the US include one top 10 hit, three top 20 hits, six top 40 hits, 14 Adult Contemporary top 30 singles and five Adult Contemporary number ones. He scored two UK number ones and a People's Choice Award. Through his solo and collaborative work, Garfunkel has earned eight Grammy Awards, including a Lifetime Achievement Award. In 1990, he and Simon were inducted into the Rock and Roll Hall of Fame. In 2008, Garfunkel was ranked 86th in Rolling Stone magazine's list of the 100 Greatest Singers of All Time.

== Early life ==
Garfunkel was born on November 5, 1941 in Forest Hills, Queens, New York City, to Rose (née Pearlman) and Jacob "Jack" Garfunkel, a traveling salesman. Art was a middle child with two brothers, the older Jules and the younger Jerome. Jacob's parents had emigrated to the United States at the beginning of the twentieth century and settled in Manhattan. Before his career in sales, Jacob worked as an actor in Dayton, Ohio. Garfunkel is of Jewish-Romanian descent. When he was young, he often sang in synagogue.

Garfunkel's love of singing originated in the first grade. "When we were lined up in size order, and after everyone else had left, I'd stay behind and enjoy the echo sound of the stairwell tiles and sing "Unchained Melody" and "You'll Never Walk Alone", learning to love this goosebumps song from the tender age of five." Later, Garfunkel's father bought him a wire recorder, and from then on, Garfunkel spent his afternoons singing, recording, and playing it back, so he could listen for flaws and learn how to improve.

At his bar mitzvah in 1954 in the Jewish Center of Kew Gardens Hills, Garfunkel performed as a hazzan, a cantor, singing over four hours of his repertoire for his family. At age 14, Garfunkel became ill with a lung infection, which led to a love for basketball. "In the summer of '55, I had a lung infection. I couldn't run around, but I loved basketball and there was a hoop nearby. Much of the summer I spent methodically hitting 96, 98 foul shots out of 100. Then 102! I never played on a team after junior high school. Just 3 against 3, half court pick up games in the schoolyard." He met future singing partner Paul Simon in the sixth grade at PS 164, when they were both cast in the elementary school graduation play, Alice in Wonderland. Garfunkel said that Simon first became interested in singing after hearing Garfunkel sing a rendition of Nat King Cole's "Too Young" in a school talent show.

Between 1956 and 1962, the two performed together as Tom & Jerry, a moniker coined by their label Big Records, occasionally performing at school dances. Their idols were the Everly Brothers, whom they imitated in their use of close two-part vocal harmony. In 1957, they recorded the song "Hey, Schoolgirl" under the name Tom & Jerry. The single reached number 49 on the pop charts. After Tom & Jerry came to a close, Garfunkel released two singles under the name Artie Garr: "Dream Alone"/"Beat Love" and "Forgive Me"/"Private World" with Warwick and Octavia Records respectively. Both singles failed to chart.

After graduating from Forest Hills High School alongside Simon, Garfunkel initially majored in architecture at Columbia University, where he was a brother in the Alpha Epsilon Pi fraternity and lived in Carman Hall. Garfunkel was a team member in tennis, skiing, fencing, and bowling at the college and also joined the all-male a cappella group on campus, the Columbia Kingsmen. While at Columbia his roommate, Sanford Greenberg, developed glaucoma and went blind. Garfunkel assisted him in his homework by reading his textbooks to Greenberg, who went on to graduate with honors. Another roommate of his was Tishman Speyer founder Jerry Speyer. Greenberg gave Garfunkel $500 to go and record a demo of "The Sound of Silence". Garfunkel earned a bachelor's degree in art history in 1965, followed by an master's degree in mathematics education from Teachers College, Columbia University in 1967. He completed coursework toward a doctorate in the latter discipline at Teachers College, Columbia University during the peak of Simon & Garfunkel's commercial success. He dropped out.

== Career ==
=== Simon & Garfunkel ===
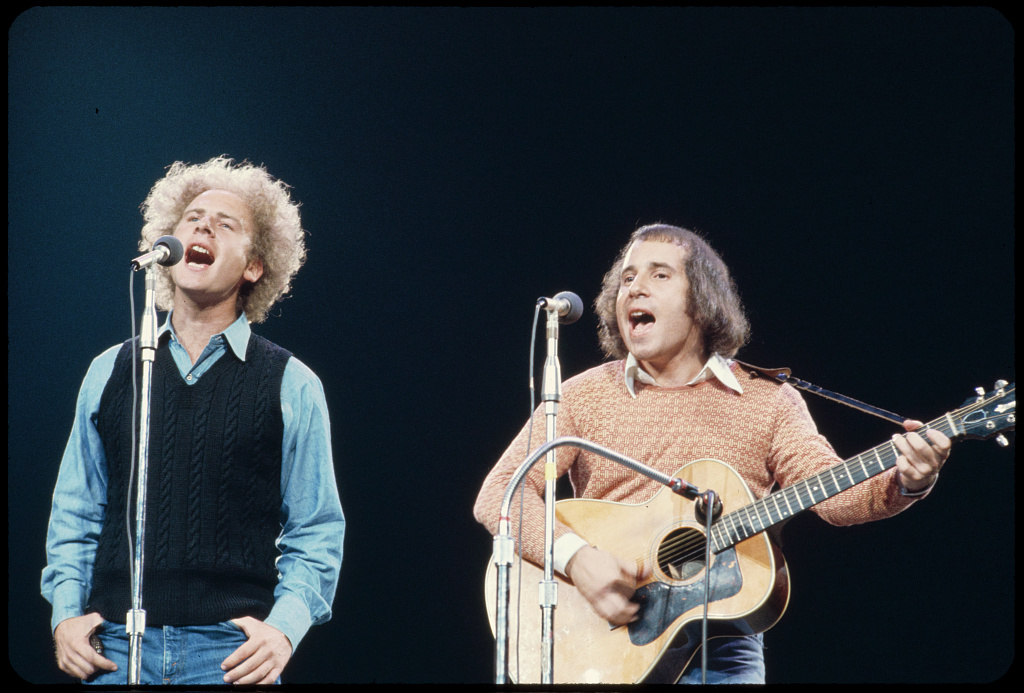
Garfunkel with Paul Simon at Madison Square Garden, 1972

In 1963, Garfunkel and Simon reformed their duo under their own names as Simon and Garfunkel. They released their first album, Wednesday Morning, 3 A.M. on Columbia Records in October 1964. It was not a critical or commercial success, and the duo split. The next year, producer Tom Wilson lifted the song "The Sound of Silence" from the record, dubbed an electric backing onto it, and released it as a single that went to number one on the Billboard pop charts.

Simon had gone to the United Kingdom in 1965 after the initial failure of Wednesday Morning, 3 A.M., to pursue a solo career. He briefly teamed with songwriter Bruce Woodley of the Seekers. After "The Sound of Silence" had started to enjoy commercial success, he returned to the US to reunite with Garfunkel. The duo recorded four more influential albums: Sounds of Silence; Parsley, Sage, Rosemary and Thyme; Bookends; and the hugely successful Bridge over Troubled Water.

They contributed to the soundtrack of the 1967 Mike Nichols' film The Graduate. While writing "Mrs. Robinson", Simon originally considered the title "Mrs. Roosevelt". When Garfunkel reported this indecision over the song's name to the director, Nichols replied, "Don't be ridiculous! We're making a movie here! It's Mrs. Robinson!" Simon & Garfunkel traveled together to England in the fall of 1968. They made a concert appearance at Kraft Hall, which was broadcast on the BBC and featured Garfunkel's solo performance of "For Emily, Whenever I May Find Her".

While Garfunkel was not a songwriter, he did write the poem "Canticle" as a re-write of Simon's "Side of A Hill" from his debut album, for "Scarborough Fair/Canticle". He was the vocal arranger for the duo. He is credited as having written the arrangement on "The Boxer" and creating "Voices of Old People" (an audio montage) on Bookends.

Citing personal differences and divergence in career interests, they split following the release of their most critically acclaimed album, Bridge over Troubled Water, in 1970. Each pursued solo projects after 1970. They occasionally reunited, as in 1975 for their Top Ten single "My Little Town", which Simon originally wrote for Garfunkel, claiming Garfunkel's solo output was lacking "bite". The song was included on their respective solo albums: Simon's Still Crazy After All These Years and Garfunkel's Breakaway. Contrary to popular belief, the song is not autobiographical of Simon's early life but of Garfunkel's childhood in Queens. In 1981, they got together again for a performance, released as The Concert in Central Park, followed by a world tour and an aborted reunion album Think Too Much, which was eventually released, by Simon without Garfunkel, as Hearts and Bones. They were inducted into the Rock and Roll Hall of Fame in 1990.

In 2003, they reunited when they received a Grammy Lifetime Achievement Award, leading to a US tour: the acclaimed "Old Friends" concert series. It was followed by another in 2004, which culminated in a free concert at the Colosseum in Rome. The concert drew 600,000 people.

=== 1970–1975: Hiatus and first album ===
During a three-year hiatus after Simon & Garfunkel's breakup, Garfunkel starred in two Mike Nichols films, Catch-22 (1970) and Carnal Knowledge (1971). He spent late 1971 to early 1972 working as a mathematics teacher teaching geometry to high school sophomores at the short-lived Litchfield Academy in Connecticut.

In late 1972, with Simon & Garfunkel having released their Greatest Hits album and briefly reuniting to perform a benefit concert for presidential candidate George McGovern, Garfunkel felt ready to return to his musical career. His first album was 1973's Angel Clare, which contained "All I Know", "I Shall Sing" and "Travelling Boy" as singles. The album was received with mixed reviews, reaching number 5 in the U.S. In 1974, Garfunkel released the hit single "Second Avenue".

On his next album, 1975's Breakaway, Garfunkel briefly reunited with Simon for the 1975 hit "My Little Town". The album included the singles "Break Away" (B-Side: "Disney Girls") and "I Only Have Eyes for You" (a 1934 song written by Harry Warren), which is noted as Garfunkel's first UK number one.

=== 1976–1979: Solo efforts ===
In 1976, Garfunkel recorded both background and duet vocals for several artists, including Stephen Bishop's album Careless, James Taylor's album In the Pocket and JD Souther's album Black Rose. From December 1976 to September 1977, Garfunkel worked on his next album.

Garfunkel's next release was the 1977 album Watermark (US No. 19, UK No. 26). It failed to make an impression on the public upon release. Its main single, "Crying in My Sleep" ("Mr. Shuck 'N' Jive") (UK No. 25) did not reach the US Top 40. After a two-month hiatus, it was re-released in January 1978, with Garfunkel's cover of Sam Cooke's "(What a) Wonderful World" (B-Side: "Wooden Planes"), reaching number one on the Adult Contemporary chart and seventeen on the pop chart. Paul Simon and mutual friend James Taylor had contributed backing vocals to the song, which was a huge hit on the US Adult Contemporary charts. In 1978, Garfunkel toured the U.S. and Canada extensively with guitarist Arlen Roth, John Barlow Jarvis on piano, and Leah Kunkel on second vocals.

Garfunkel's last release of the 1970s was the 1979 album Fate for Breakfast (US No. 67, UK No. 2). It was his first US flop. The album's first single, "In A Little While (I'll Be on My Way)" (B-Side: "And I Know") (US AC No. 12) failed to break the top forty, as did his second single, "Since I Don't Have You" (B-Side: "When Someone Doesn't Want You") (US No. 53, US AC No. 5, UK No. 38). The album was a huge success in the UK, scoring a number one hit with "Bright Eyes" (B-Side: "Sail on a Rainbow") (US AC No. 29, UK No. 1) (a song written by Mike Batt).

Garfunkel's girlfriend since 1974, Laurie Bird, died by suicide in June 1979 at their Manhattan apartment, three months after the album's release in March. Garfunkel stated that her death left him in a deep depression.

=== 1980–1995: Depression and withdrawal ===
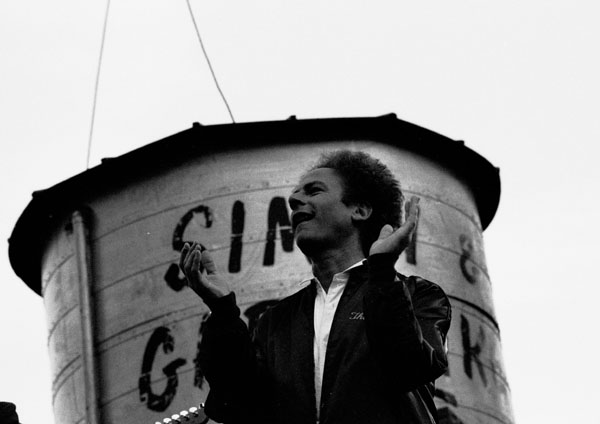
Garfunkel in a concert in Dublin, c. 1982

In 1980, he sang on the Crosby, Stills, Nash & Young song "Daylight Again", featured on the album of the same name.

Garfunkel's next album was a low point in his career. The 1981 album, Scissors Cut (US No. 113, UK No. 51) (dedicated to Bird), contained three singles, "A Heart in New York" (B-Side: "Is This Love") (US No. 66, US AC No. 10), "Scissors Cut", and "Hang On In". The latter two failed to chart.

Following disappointing sales of Scissors Cut, Garfunkel reunited with Simon for The Concert in Central Park and a world tour. They had significant disagreements during the tour. In 1984, Stereo Review Magazine reported that Simon mixed out Garfunkel's voice from a new album. It was initially slated to be a Simon & Garfunkel studio reunion, but was ultimately released in 1983 as a Simon solo album (Hearts and Bones). In 1986, Garfunkel played the part of the butcher on the Mike Batt concept album The Hunting of the Snark.

Garfunkel released his first compilation album in 1984, The Art Garfunkel Album (UK No. 12), never released in the US, which contained the minor hit "Sometimes When I'm Dreaming" (UK No. 77, US AC No. 25).

In the fall of 1985, he met his future wife, Kathryn "Kim" Cermak; they were married in September 1988. Garfunkel's next release was his 1988 album, Lefty (US, No. 134), which produced three singles, "So Much in Love" (US No. 76, US AC No. 11), "When a Man Loves a Woman", and "This Is the Moment".

=== 1996–2006: Resurgence ===
Garfunkel's live 1996 concert Across America (UK No. 35), recorded at the registry hall on Ellis Island, featured musical guests James Taylor, Garfunkel's wife, Kim, and their son James.

Garfunkel performed the theme song for the 1991 television series Brooklyn Bridge and "The Ballad of Buster Baxter" for a 1998 episode of the children's educational television series Arthur, where he was depicted as a singing moose. Garfunkel's performance of Monty Python member Eric Idle's "Always Look on the Bright Side of Life" was used in the end credits of the 1997 film As Good as It Gets.

In 2002, Garfunkel made his debut as a songwriter on his Everything Waits to Be Noticed album. Working with singer-songwriters Maia Sharp and Buddy Mondlock, the album contained several songs which were originally poems written by Garfunkel.

In 2003, Simon and Garfunkel reunited for a world tour that extended into 2004. That same year, his song "Sometimes When I'm Dreaming" from The Art Garfunkel Album (1984) (written by Mike Batt) was re-recorded by ABBA singer Agnetha Fältskog on her album My Colouring Book.

In 2006, Garfunkel signed with Rhino Records (revived Atco Records), releasing his first Rhino/Atco album Some Enchanted Evening in the United States on January 30, 2007. The album was a dedicated celebration of pop standards of Garfunkel's childhood.

=== 2008–present: Recent events and vocal problems ===
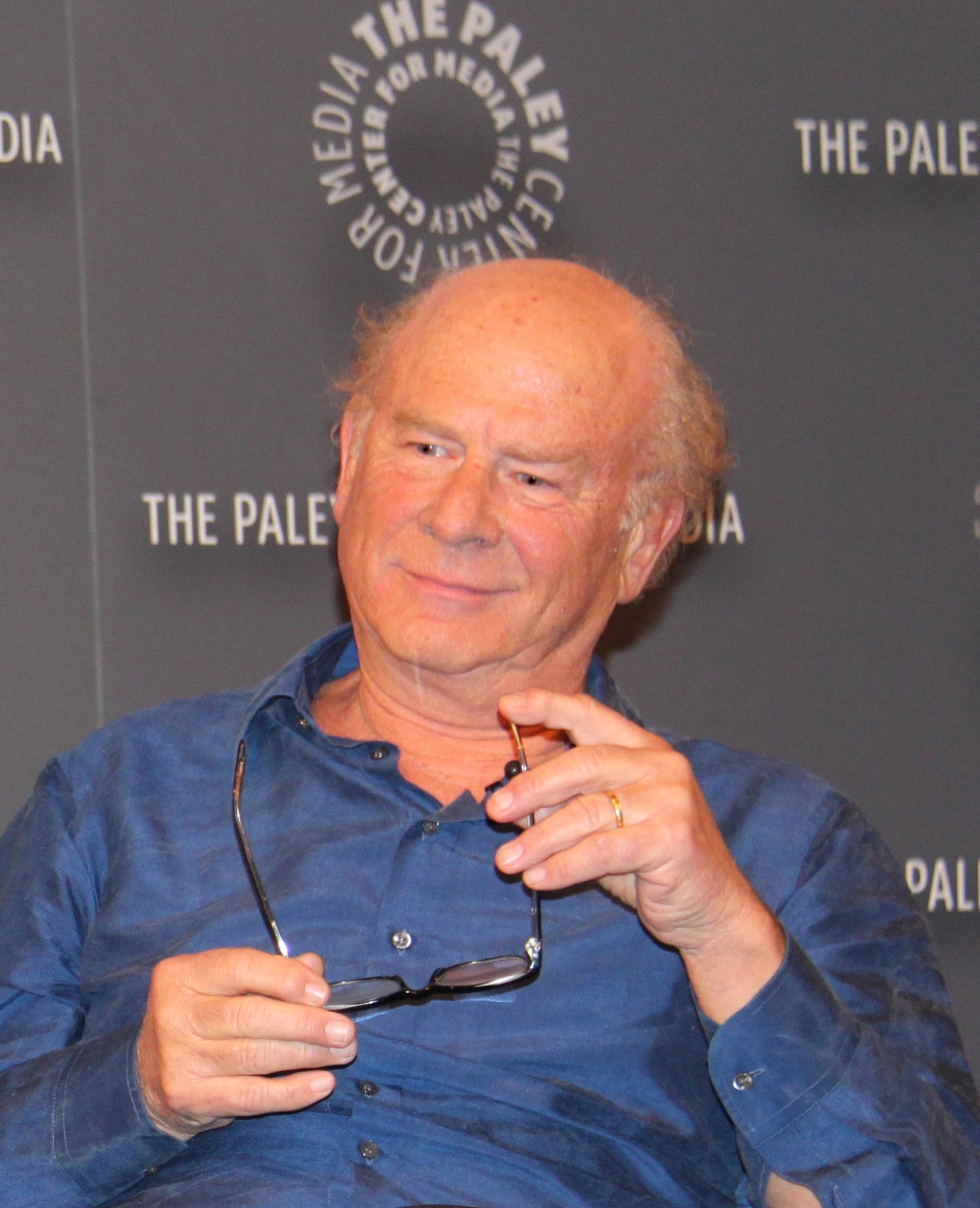
Garfunkel in New York City, 2013

In 2009, Garfunkel appeared as himself on the HBO television show Flight of the Conchords episode entitled "Prime Minister".

Garfunkel continued to tour in 2009 with four musicians and his son.

On February 13, 2009, Simon and his band re-opened New York's Beacon Theatre, which had been closed for seven months for renovation. As an encore, Simon brought out "my old friend, Art Garfunkel". They sang three songs: "Sound of Silence", "The Boxer", and "Old Friends".

On April 2, 2009, the duo announced a tour of Australia, New Zealand, and Japan for summer 2009. In late October, they participated together in the 25th anniversary of Rock and Roll Hall of Fame concerts at New York's Madison Square Garden. Other artists on the bill included Bruce Springsteen & The E Street Band, U2, Metallica, Aretha Franklin, Stevie Wonder, and Crosby, Stills, & Nash.

In January 2010, Garfunkel developed vocal problems following damage to his vocal cords as the result of an incident in which he had briefly choked on a piece of lobster. In March 2010, Simon & Garfunkel announced a 13-date tour. According to a press release, the set list would focus on their classic catalog as well as songs from each of their solo careers. The first date in the tour was on April 24, a headlining set at the 2010 New Orleans Jazz & Heritage Festival. Due to his vocal cord injury, singing proved difficult for Garfunkel. "I was terrible, and crazy nervous. I leaned on Paul Simon and the affection of the crowd", he told Rolling Stone several years later. Several months later on June 10, they performed "Mrs. Robinson" at an AFI Life Achievement Award tribute to director Mike Nichols. On June 17, Simon & Garfunkel canceled the tour, previously rescheduled for July 2010, which was postponed indefinitely while Garfunkel attempted to recover from a vocal cord paresis.

In November 2010, Garfunkel said that because of quitting smoking he was recovering from paresis and would be touring in 2011.

He tried to resume touring in August 2012 just after releasing a 34-song retrospective, The Singer. Garfunkel scheduled 19 solo shows in the United States and Sweden between August and December 2012. 16 of the shows were canceled. Garfunkel was due to perform at Night of The Proms in Gothenburg and Malmö, Sweden, on September 28 and 29, 2012, but canceled at the last minute due to an "unforeseen vocal issue". Speaking about his voice in February 2013, Garfunkel said "It's getting mostly better; I'm pretty much there" and that he was starting to book small shows again. In 2014, he resumed touring. From 2014 to 2019, Garfunkel regularly toured and performed, with his voice restored and Tab Laven accompanying him on acoustic guitar.

On the September 30, 2015, episode of The Tonight Show Starring Jimmy Fallon, Garfunkel took part in the spoof "Black Simon & Garfunkel" skit with members of The Roots.

The Simon and Garfunkel song "America" was used by Bernie Sanders during his 2016 presidential campaign; Garfunkel appreciated Sanders' fight against wealth inequality.

On September 26, 2017, Knopf Doubleday published in hardcover Garfunkel's memoir What Is It All but Luminous: Notes from an Underground Man. Penguin Random House has published it in softcover and audiobook. On April 10, 2023, Garfunkel canceled his remaining concert dates and his management announced "that he has decided not to return to touring for the foreseeable future."

On November 8, 2024, Garfunkel released the studio album Father and Son, a duets album with his son, Art Garfunkel Jr. The album features twelve cover songs, including "Blackbird", "Blue Moon", "Vincent", and one Simon & Garfunkel song, a recording of "Old Friends".

=== Poetry ===
Garfunkel, an avid reader and bibliophile, has said that while growing up the Garfunkel household was not a literary family and that it was not until entering Columbia University in 1959 that he began to "read a million books and became a reader." Thus began his interest in poetry.

Garfunkel's poetic career began in 1981 while on the Simon & Garfunkel 1981–1982 tour in Switzerland. He was riding a motorcycle and began writing a poem describing the countryside. In 1989, Still Water, Garfunkel's collection of prose poetry, was released to acclaim. Topics included his depression over the loss of his father; Laurie Bird, his companion who committed suicide; his friendship with Paul Simon; and the joy of returning to music.

=== Acting ===
Garfunkel pursued an acting career in the early 1970s, appearing in two Mike Nichols films: Catch-22 (1970), in which he played a supporting role as the 19-year-old naive Lieutenant Nately, and Carnal Knowledge (1971), a co-starring role in which he played the idealistic character Sandy. For his role as Sandy he received a nomination for Best Supporting Actor at the 1972 Golden Globe Awards.

He appeared in Nicolas Roeg's Bad Timing (1980) as Alex Linden, an American psychiatrist who serves as the film's main antagonist. The film received the Toronto Festival of Festivals' highest honor, the People's Choice Award, and the London Film Critics' Circle Award for Best Director.

He appeared in Good to Go (1986), directed by Blain Novak, starring as a Washington, D.C., journalist who struggles to clear his name after being framed for rape and murder. Garfunkel then appeared in the medical crime drama Boxing Helena (1993), directed by Jennifer Lynch, as Lawrence Augustine.

Garfunkel's most recent film is The Rebound (2009), directed by Bart Freundlich. He played Harry Finklestein, the slightly senile and comic-relief father of the film's main character.

== Voice classification ==
Garfunkel is a tenor who usually sang the higher parts in Simon & Garfunkel's harmonies. His voice changed almost imperceptibly until his late fifties, when it began to lower after years of smoking. He quit smoking around 2010 to aid his recovery from vocal cord paresis.

== Personal life ==
Garfunkel married Linda Marie Grossman (b. 1944), an architect, in Nashville on October 1, 1972, and they divorced in 1975. He once claimed that not only did he not love her, he did not even like her all that much.

He was romantically involved with actress and photographer Laurie Bird from March 1974 until her suicide in 1979 from an overdose of Valium in the New York apartment they shared. Garfunkel was deeply affected by her death, and said: "She was beautiful, in a lonesome, haunted way, and I adored her. But I wasn't ready for marriage and she was not very comfortable being Laurie. She wasn't happy with herself. Her mother committed suicide at 26, and so did she."

In late 1985, Garfunkel met former model Kathryn (Kim) Cermak (b. 1958; Czech spelling Čermák) while shooting Good to Go. They married on September 18, 1988, and have two sons born in 1990 and 2005, via surrogate mother. One of them, Arthur Jr., is also a singer, and released two German-language tribute albums with Simon & Garfunkel's greatest hits. Garfunkel and his son collaborated on Father and Son in 2024; "My dad chose more of the songs from the 1940s," the younger singer explained, "and I was more of the 1980s selection. The 'Father and Son' recording was my suggestion, and my father did a great job with it."

Garfunkel has undertaken several long walks in his lifetime, writing poetry along the way. In the early 1980s, he walked across Japan in a number of weeks. From 1983 to 1997, Garfunkel walked across the United States, taking 40 excursions to complete the route from New York City to the Pacific coast of Oregon. In May 1998, Garfunkel began a series of planned walks across Europe, from a start in Ireland to his final stop in Istanbul in 2015.

Despite being a native New Yorker, Garfunkel is a lifelong Philadelphia Phillies fan, having written on his website: "I never followed the crowd. So as a Queens kid, I didn't want to be a Dodger, a Yankee, or Giant fan. One day when I was 8 I went to Ebbets Field and saw the Phillies with their red pinstripes, Robin Roberts, Pudinhead Jones. Somehow this was for me. The rest is loyalty. Decades of pain."

Garfunkel has been arrested twice for the possession of marijuana: once in early 2004 and again in August 2005.

Garfunkel is first cousins with music manager and convicted felon Lou Pearlman.

== Nominations ==
- 1972 Golden Globe Awards, Best Supporting Actor – Motion Picture, for Carnal Knowledge
- 1998 Grammy Awards, Best Musical Album for Children, for Songs from a Parent to a Child

== Awards ==
- 1969 Grammy Awards, Record of the Year, for "Mrs. Robinson" as part of (Simon & Garfunkel)
- 1969 Grammy Awards, Best Contemporary Pop Performance, for "Mrs. Robinson" as part of (Simon & Garfunkel)
- 1970 Grammy Awards, Album of the Year, for Bridge over Troubled Water (Simon & Garfunkel)
- 1970 Grammy Awards, Record of the Year, for "Bridge over Troubled Water"
- 1970 Grammy Awards, Best Arrangement Accompanying Vocalist(s), for Bridge over Troubled Water
- 1977 Britannia Award, Best International Pop LP and Single, 1952–77, for "Bridge over Troubled Water"
- 2015 German Sustainability Award

== Work on Broadway ==
- Rock 'N Roll! The First 5,000 Years (1982) – revue – featured singer for Mrs. Robinson
- Mike Nichols and Elaine May: Together Again on Broadway (1992) – concert – performer
- The Graduate (2002) – play – featured songwriter

== Discography ==
- Angel Clare (1973)
- Breakaway (1975)
- Watermark (1977)
- Fate for Breakfast (1979)
- Scissors Cut (1981)
- The Animals' Christmas (1986) (with Amy Grant)
- Lefty (1988)
- Songs from a Parent to a Child (1997)
- Everything Waits to Be Noticed (2002) (with Maia Sharp and Buddy Mondlock)
- Some Enchanted Evening (2007)
- Father and Son (2024) (with Art Garfunkel Jr.)

== Filmography ==
| Year | Film or television series | Role | Notes |
|---|---|---|---|
| 1970 | Catch-22 | Lieutenant Edward J. Nately III | Debut screen role |
| 1971 | Carnal Knowledge | Dr. Sandy Kaufman | Nomination for Golden Globe Award for Best Supporting Actor – Motion Picture |
| 1973 | Acts of Love and Other Comedies | Nick | Television film |
| 1975 | Saturday Night Live | Himself | Episode: "Season 1 Episode 2" |
| 1980 | Bad Timing | Dr. Alex Linden | |
| 1980 | Laverne & Shirley | The Mighty Oak | Episode: "The Beatnik Show" |
| 1986 | Good to Go | S.D. Blass | |
| 1990 | Mother Goose Rock 'n' Rhyme | Georgie Porgie | Television film |
| 1993 | Boxing Helena | Dr. Lawrence Augustine | |
| 1994 | Frasier | Chester (voice) | Episode: "Adventures in Paradise: Part 1" |
| 1998 | 54 | Himself | Cameo |
| 1998 | Arthur | Singing Moose (voice) | Episode: "The Ballad of Buster Baxter" |
| 2001 | Longshot | Himself | Cameo |
| 2003 | American Dreams | Mr. Greenwood | Episode: "False Start" |
| 2009 | Flight of the Conchords | Himself | Episode: "Prime Minister" |
| 2009 | The Rebound | Harry Finklestein | |
| 2011 | Beatles Stories | Himself | Documentary |
| 2017 | Cecile on the Phone | Dr. Saltzman | Short film |

== Sources ==
- Garfunkel, Art (August 1989). Still Water: Prose Poems. Dutton and Dial. ISBN 978-0-525-24795-1.
- Cohen, Mitchell S. (1977). Simon & Garfunkel: A Biography in Words & Pictures. Sire Books.
- Humphries, Patrick (August 1983). Bookends: The Simon and Garfunkel Story. Proteus. ISBN 978-0-86276-063-2.
- Svenson, John (November 15, 1984). Simon and Garfunkel: A Musical Autobiography. W.H.Allen. ISBN 978-0-491-03490-6.
- Matthew-Walker, Robert (1984). Simon and Garfunkel. Hippocrene Books. ISBN 978-0-88254-729-9.
- Morella, Joseph; Patricia Barey (October 1991). Simon and Garfunkel: Old Friends: A Dual Biography (1st ed.). Carol Publishing Corporation. ISBN 978-1-55972-089-2.
- Kingston, Victoria (May 1997). Simon & Garfunkel: The Definitive Biography. Trans-Atlantic Publications. ISBN 978-0-330-34970-3.
- Fornatale, Pete (October 30, 2007). Simon & Garfunkel's Bookends (1st ed.). Rodale Books. ISBN 978-1-59486-427-8.
