= List of UK top-ten singles in 1976 =

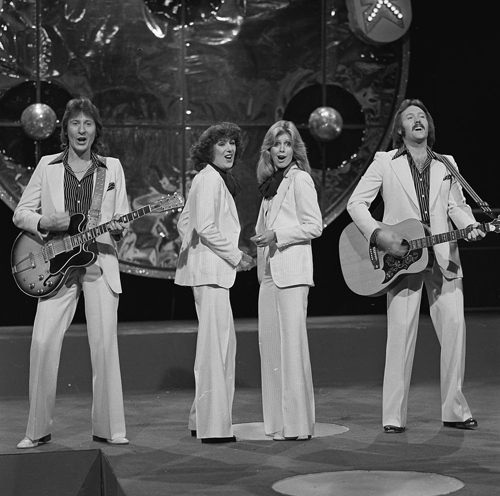
Brotherhood of Man had the biggest-selling single of 1976, with "Save Your Kisses for Me", the winning song of that year's Eurovision Song Contest, which spent six weeks at number-one.

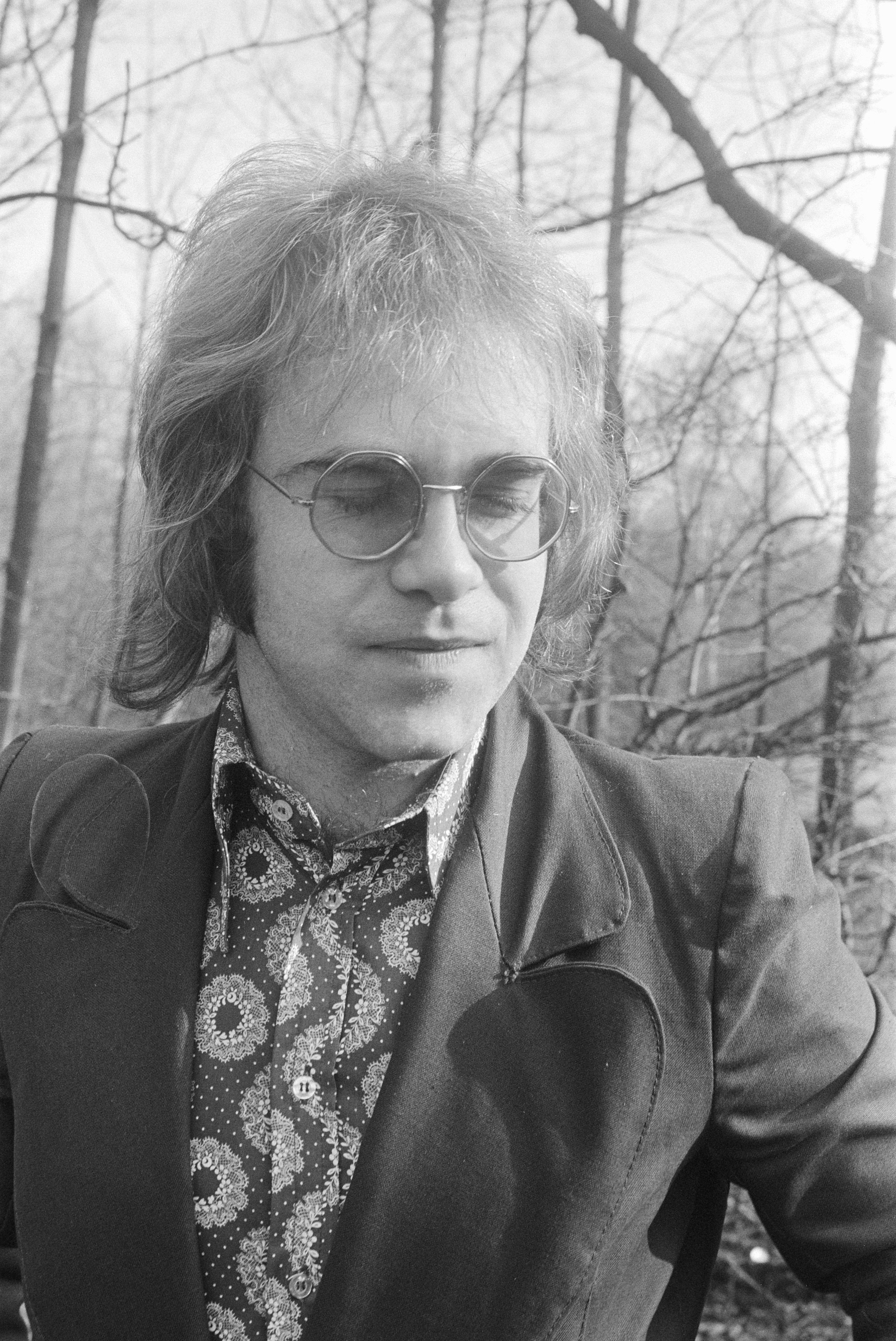
Elton John had two top 10 singles this year, including his duet with Kiki Dee, "Don't Go Breaking My Heart", which topped the charts for six weeks and became the year's second best selling single.

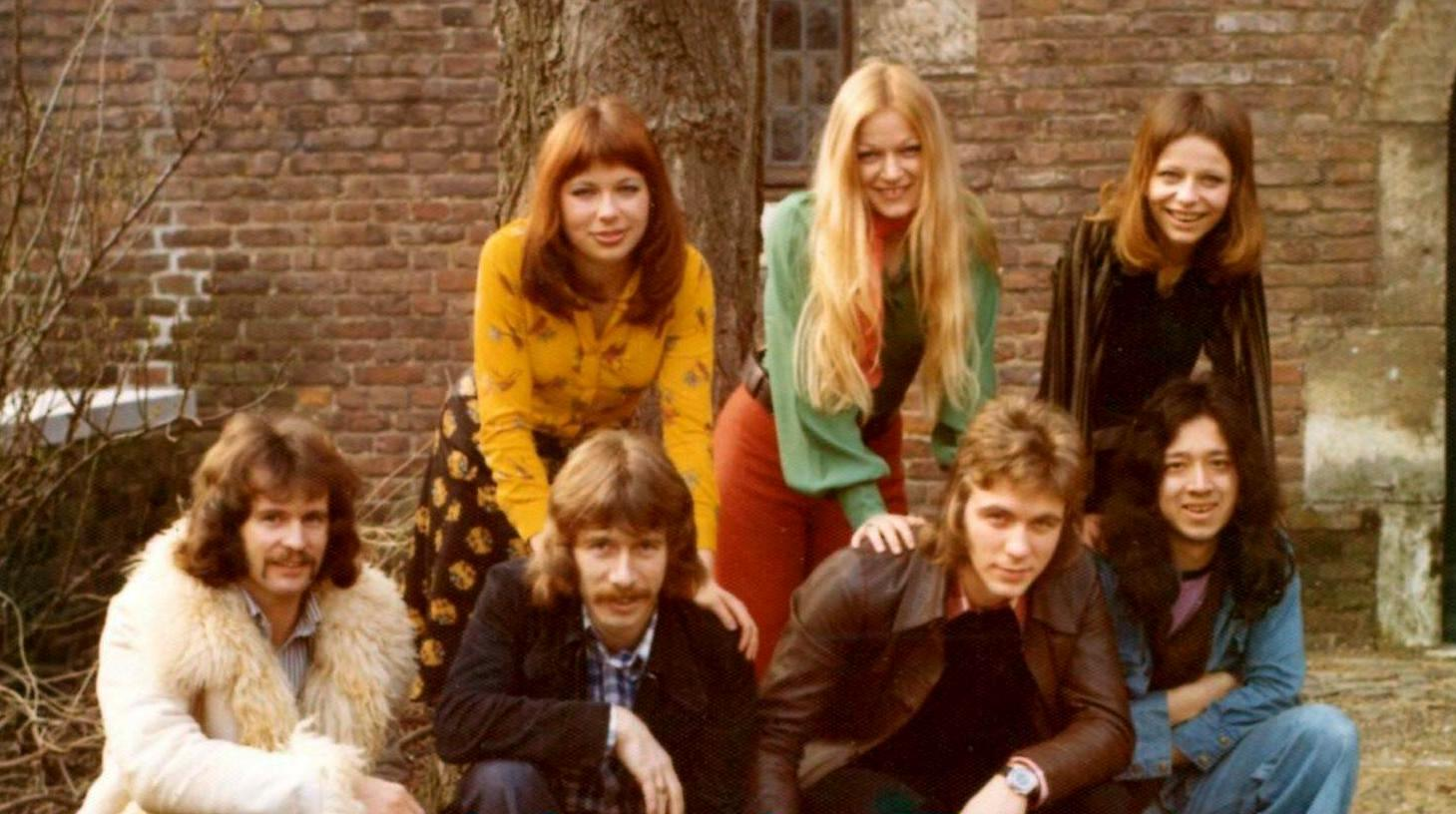
Pussycat became the first act from The Netherlands to reach number-one in the UK with their song "Mississippi", which spent four weeks at the top of the chart and became the third best selling single of 1976.

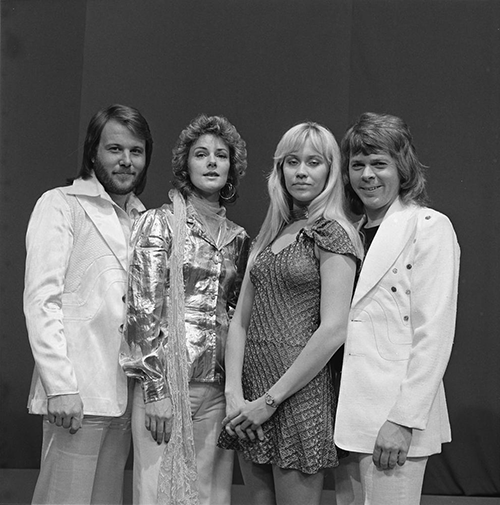
ABBA achieved four consecutive UK top 10 entries this year, the first three of which went to number-one; "Mamma Mia", "Fernando" and "Dancing Queen", while "Money, Money, Money" peaked at number three in December.

The UK Singles Chart is one of many music charts compiled by the Official Charts Company that calculates the best-selling singles of the week in the United Kingdom. Before 2004, the chart was only based on the sales of physical singles. This list shows singles that peaked in the Top 10 of the UK Singles Chart during 1976, as well as singles which peaked in 1975 and 1977 but were in the top 10 in 1976. The entry date is when the single appeared in the top 10 for the first time (week ending, as published by the Official Charts Company, which is six days after the chart is announced).

One-hundred and thirty singles were in the top ten in 1976. Ten singles from 1975 remained in the top 10 for several weeks at the beginning of the year, while "Portsmouth" by Mike Oldfield, "Living Next Door to Alice" by Smokie and "Dr. Love" by Tina Charles were all released in 1976 but did not reach their peak until 1977. Twenty-four artists scored multiple entries in the top 10 in 1976. Billy Ocean, Dolly Parton, John Miles, Mike Oldfield and The Real Thing were among the many artists who achieved their first UK charting top 10 single in 1976.

The 1975 Christmas number-one, "Bohemian Rhapsody" by Queen, remained at number-one for the first four weeks of 1976. The first new number-one single of the year was "Mamma Mia" by ABBA. Overall, sixteen different singles peaked at number-one in 1976, with ABBA (3) having the most singles hit that position.

== Background ==
=== Multiple entries ===
One-hundred and thirty singles charted in the top 10 in 1976, with one-hundred and seventeen singles reaching their peak this year.

Twenty-four artists scored multiple entries in the top 10 in 1976. ABBA and The Stylistics shared the record for most top 10 hits in 1976 with four hit singles each. "Mamma Mia", "Fernando" and "Dancing Queen" all reached number-one, while "Money, Money, Money" peaked at number three in December.

The Wurzels was one of a number of artists with two top-ten entries, including the number-one single "The Combine Harvester". 10cc, Bryan Ferry, Elton John, Mike Oldfield and Wings were among the other artists who had multiple top 10 entries in 1976.

=== Chart debuts ===
Fifty artists achieved their first top 10 single in 1976, either as a lead or featured artist. Gallagher and Lyle, The Manhattans, Mike Oldfield, The Real Thing, Sailor and The Wurzels all had another entry in their breakthrough year.

The following table (collapsed on desktop site) does not include acts who had previously charted as part of a group and secured their first top 10 solo single.

Artist	Number of top 10s	First entry	Chart position	Other entries
Sailor	2	"A Glass of Champagne"	2	"Girls, Girls Girls" (7)
Mike Oldfield	2	"In Dulci Jubilo"/"On Horseback"	4	"Portsmouth" (3) ^{[A]}
Billy Howard	1	"King of the Cops"	6	—
R&J Stone	1	"We Do It"	5	—
Paul Davidson	1	"Midnight Rider"	10	—
Slik	1	"Forever and Ever"	1	—
Donna Summer	1	"Love to Love You Baby"	4	—
Barbara Dickson	1	"Answer Me"	9	—
David Ruffin	1	"Walk Away from Love"	10	—
C. W. McCall	1	"Convoy"	2	—
Pluto Shervington	1	"Dat"	6	—
Yvonne Fair	1	"It Should Have Been Me"	5	—
Billy Ocean	1	"Love Really Hurts Without You"	2	—
Fatback Band	1	"(Do The) Spanish Hustle"	10	—
Gallagher and Lyle	2	"I Wanna Stay with You"	6	"Heart on My Sleeve" (6)
John Miles	1	"Music"	3	—
Hank Mizell	1	"Jungle Rock"	3	—
Silver Convention	1	"Get Up and Boogie"	7	—
Laurie Lingo and the Dipsticks	1	"Convoy G.B."	4	—
Sheer Elegance	1	"Life Is Too Short Girl"	9	—
Andrea True Connection	1	"More, More, More"	5	—
Sutherland Brothers & Quiver	1	"Arms of Mary"	5	—
J. J. Barrie	1	"No Charge"	1	—
The Wurzels	2	"The Combine Harvester"	1	"I Am a Cider Drinker" (3)
Robin Sarstedt	1	"My Resistance Is Low"	3	—
The Bellamy Brothers	1	"Let Your Love Flow"	7	—
The Real Thing	2	"You to Me Are Everything"	1	"Can't Get By Without You" (2)
Melba Moore	1	"This Is It"	9	—
Our Kid	1	"You Just Might See Me Cry"	2	—
Dolly Parton	1	"Jolene"	7	—
Candi Staton	1	"Young Hearts Run Free"	2	—
The Manhattans	2	"Kiss and Say Goodbye"	4	"Hurt" (4)
Kiki Dee	1	"Don't Go Breaking My Heart"	1	—
Dorothy Moore	1	"Misty Blue"	5	—
David Dundas	1	"Jeans On"	3	—
Jimmy James and the Vagabonds	1	"Now Is The Time"	5	—
Gheorghe Zamfir	1	"Light of Experience (Doina De Jale)"	4	—
Lou Rawls	1	"You'll Never Find Another Love like Mine"	10	—
Pussycat	1	"Mississippi"	1	—
Rick Dees & His Cast of Idiots]	1	"Disco Duck"	6	—
Sherbet	1	"Howzat"	4	—
The Ritchie Family	1	"The Best Disco in Town"	10	—
Simon May	1	"The Summer of My Life"	7	—
Tavares	2	"Heaven Must Be Missing an Angel"	4	—
Paul Nicholas	1	"Dancing with the Captain"	8	—
Wild Cherry	1	"Play That Funky Music"	7	—
Joan Armatrading	1	"Love and Affection"	10	—
Climax Blues Band	1	"Couldn't Get It Right"	10	—
Yvonne Elliman	1	"Love Me"	6	—
Bonnie Tyler	1	"Lost in France"	9	—

Notes

Dr. Hook had previously charted under the name Dr. Hook & the Medicine Show but their name was shortened in 1975. Ray Parker Jr. wrote "You See the Trouble with Me" and appeared alongside Barry White on the US single release, however he is not credited by the Official Charts Company for the UK release. His first and only official top 10 single would not come until the Ghostbusters theme song reached number 2 in 1984.

The Miracles had their first top 10 single - "Love Machine" - since the departure of Smokey Robinson, who had been replaced by Billy Griffin. They had been known as Smokey Robinson and the Miracles for their previous two top 10 entries. Geoff Love charted under the pseudonym Manuel and the Music of the Mountains in 1976, a moniker he had used since the late 1950s. He had debuted with two singles in 1960 using his own name.

David Ruffin was a member of The Temptations in their early days (1964–1968) but this was prior to the group making their top 10 debut with "I'm Gonna Make You Love Me" in 1969. Peter Frampton also started off in bands, scoring chart hits with both The Herd and Humble Pie in the late 1960s. "Show Me the Way" was his debut top 10 entry as a solo artist.

Jonathan King recorded the song "It Only Takes a Minute" as 100 Ton and a Feather. His chart debut had been "Everyone's Gone to the Moon", a number 4 hit in 1965. Tina Charles was in the line-up of 5000 Volts until this year; the group had one top 10 single, "I'm on Fire", in 1975 before her departure as she launched her solo career.

Johnny Wakelin's first release in 1975, "Black Superman (Muhammed Ali)", was billed as Johnny Wakelin and the Kinshasa Band.

=== Songs from films ===
The only song from a film to enter the top 10 in 1976 was "Theme from "Mahogany" (Do You Know Where You're Going To)" (from Mahogany).

=== Best-selling singles ===
Brotherhood of Man had the best-selling single of the year with "Save Your Kisses for Me". The song spent ten weeks in the top 10 (including six weeks at number one), sold over 1.006 million copies and was certified platinum by the BPI. "Don't Go Breaking My Heart" by Elton John & Kiki Dee came in second place. Pussycat's "Mississippi", "Dancing Queen" from ABBA and "A Little Bit More" by Dr. Hook made up the top five. Songs by Chicago, ABBA ("Fernando"), Tina Charles, Demis Roussos and The Four Seasons were also in the top ten best-selling singles of the year.

== Top-ten singles ==
Key

Symbol	Meaning
‡	Single peaked in 1975 but still in chart in 1976.
♦	Single released in 1976 but peaked in 1977.
(#)	Year-end top-ten single position and rank
Entered	The date that the single first appeared in the chart.
Peak	Highest position that the single reached in the UK Singles Chart.

Entered (week ending)	Weeks in top 10	Single	Artist	Peak	Peak reached (week ending)	Weeks at peak
Singles in 1975
22 November 1975	8	"You Sexy Thing" ‡	Hot Chocolate	2	29 November 1975	3
22 November 1975	12	"Bohemian Rhapsody" ‡	Queen	1	29 November 1975	9
6 December 1975	5	"Na Na Is the Saddest Word" ‡	The Stylistics	5	13 December 1975	1
6 December 1975	6	"The Trail of the Lonesome Pine" ‡	Laurel and Hardy with The Avalon Boys featuring Chill Wills	2	20 December 1975	2
6 December 1975	6	"Let's Twist Again"/"The Twist" ‡ ^{[B]}	Chubby Checker	5	27 December 1975	3
20 December 1975	4	"I Believe in Father Christmas" ‡	Greg Lake	2	27 December 1975	2
20 December 1975	4	"Happy to Be on an Island in the Sun" ‡ ^{[C]}	Demis Roussos	5	20 December 1975	1
20 December 1975	4	"Golden Years" ‡	David Bowie	8	20 December 1975	2
27 December 1975	3	"It's Gonna Be a Cold Cold Christmas" ‡	Dana	4	27 December 1975	2
27 December 1975	2	"Renta Santa" ‡	Chris Hill	10	27 December 1975	2
Singles in 1976
10 January 1976	5	"A Glass of Champagne"	Sailor	2	17 January 1976	2
10 January 1976	3	"Wide Eyed and Legless"	Andy Fairweather Low	6	10 January 1976	1
10 January 1976	2	"Art for Art's Sake"	10cc	5	17 January 1976	1
10 January 1976	1	"Can I Take You Home Little Girl"	The Drifters	10	10 January 1976	1
17 January 1976	6	"Mamma Mia"	ABBA	1	31 January 1976	2
17 January 1976	4	"In Dulci Jubilo"/"On Horseback"	Mike Oldfield	4	17 January 1976	2
17 January 1976	4	"King Of The Cops"	Billy Howard	6	24 January 1976	1
17 January 1976	1	"Itchycoo Park" ^{[D]}	Small Faces	9	17 January 1976	1
24 January 1976	5	"Love Machine"	The Miracles	3	7 February 1976	1
24 January 1976	5	"We Do It"	R&J Stone	5	7 February 1976	1
24 January 1976	1	"Let the Music Play"	Barry White	9	24 January 1976	1
24 January 1976	1	"Midnight Rider"	Paul Davidson	10	24 January 1976	1
31 January 1976	6	"Forever and Ever"	Slik	1	14 February 1976	1
31 January 1976	4	"Love to Love You Baby"	Donna Summer	4	7 February 1976	1
31 January 1976	1	"Evil Woman"	Electric Light Orchestra	10	31 January 1976	1
7 February 1976	7	"December, 1963 (Oh, What a Night)" (#10)	The Four Seasons	1	21 February 1976	2
14 February 1976	2	"No Regrets" ^{[E]}	The Walker Brothers	7	14 February 1976	1
14 February 1976	5	"Rodrigo's Guitar Concerto de Aranjuez"	Manuel & The Music of The Mountains	3	28 February 1976	1
14 February 1976	1	"Answer Me"	Barbara Dickson	9	14 February 1976	1
14 February 1976	1	"Walk Away from Love"	David Ruffin	10	14 February 1976	1
21 February 1976	7	"I Love to Love" (#8)	Tina Charles	1	6 March 1976	3
21 February 1976	6	"Convoy"	C. W. McCall	2	20 March 1976	1
21 February 1976	3	"Dat"	Pluto Shervington	6	6 March 1976	1
28 February 1976	4	"It Should Have Been Me"	Yvonne Fair	5	6 March 1976	1
28 February 1976	3	"Rain"	Status Quo	7	6 March 1976	1
28 February 1976	1	"Squeeze Box"	The Who	10	28 February 1976	1
6 March 1976	6	"Love Really Hurts Without You"	Billy Ocean	2	27 March 1976	1
6 March 1976	1	"Funky Weekend"	The Stylistics	10	6 March 1976	1
13 March 1976	4	"People Like You and People Like Me"	The Glitter Band	5	27 March 1976	1
13 March 1976	3	"You Don't Have to Say You Love Me"	Guys 'n' Dolls	5	20 March 1976	1
13 March 1976	1	"(Do The) Spanish Hustle"	Fatback Band	10	13 March 1976	1
20 March 1976	10	"Save Your Kisses for Me" (#1) ^{[F]}	Brotherhood of Man	1	27 March 1976	6
20 March 1976	6	"You See the Trouble with Me"	Barry White	2	3 April 1976	2
20 March 1976	3	"I Wanna Stay with You"	Gallagher and Lyle	6	3 April 1976	1
27 March 1976	2	"Falling Apart at The Seams"	Marmalade	9	27 March 1976	2
27 March 1976	3	"Yesterday"	The Beatles	8	3 April 1976	1
3 April 1976	4	"Music"	John Miles	3	10 April 1976	3
3 April 1976	3	"Pinball Wizard"	Elton John	7	3 April 1976	1
10 April 1976	10	"Fernando" (#7)	ABBA	1	8 May 1976	4
10 April 1976	4	"I'm Mandy Fly Me"	10cc	6	10 April 1976	3
10 April 1976	7	"Jungle Rock"	Hank Mizell	3	1 May 1976	3
10 April 1976	5	"Theme from Mahogany (Do You Know Where You're Going To)"	Diana Ross	5	24 April 1976	1
17 April 1976	3	"Love Me Like I Love You"	Bay City Rollers	4	1 May 1976	1
17 April 1976	3	"Girls, Girls, Girls"	Sailor	7	24 April 1976	2
24 April 1976	4	"Get Up and Boogie"	Silver Convention	7	8 May 1976	1
1 May 1976	4	"S-S-S-Single Bed"	Fox	4	15 May 1976	1
1 May 1976	2	"Disco Connection"	Isaac Hayes	10	1 May 1976	2
8 May 1976	2	"Convoy G.B."	Laurie Lingo & the Dipsticks	4	8 May 1976	1
8 May 1976	3	"Silver Star"	The Four Seasons	3	22 May 1976	1
8 May 1976	1	"Life Is Too Short Girl"	Sheer Elegance	9	8 May 1976	1
15 May 1976	3	"More, More, More"	Andrea True Connection	5	15 May 1976	2
15 May 1976	5	"Arms of Mary"	Sutherland Brothers & Quiver	5	22 May 1976	1
15 May 1976	2	"Can't Help Falling in Love"	The Stylistics	4	22 May 1976	1
22 May 1976	5	"No Charge"	J. J. Barrie	1	5 June 1976	1
22 May 1976	4	"Fool to Cry"	The Rolling Stones	6	5 June 1976	1
29 May 1976	6	"The Combine Harvester"	The Wurzels	1	12 June 1976	2
29 May 1976	4	"My Resistance Is Low"	Robin Sarstedt	3	5 June 1976	1
29 May 1976	6	"Silly Love Songs"	Wings	2	12 June 1976	1
29 May 1976	3	"Let Your Love Flow"	The Bellamy Brothers	7	5 June 1976	1
29 May 1976	1	"Love Hangover"	Diana Ross	10	29 May 1976	1
5 June 1976	1	"Devil Woman"	Cliff Richard	9	5 June 1976	1
5 June 1976	1	"Midnight Train to Georgia"	Gladys Knight & the Pips	10	5 June 1976	1
12 June 1976	7	"You to Me Are Everything"	The Real Thing	1	26 June 1976	3
12 June 1976	1	"This Is It"	Melba Moore	9	12 June 1976	1
19 June 1976	5	"You Just Might See Me Cry"	Our Kid	2	3 July 1976	1
19 June 1976	3	"Heart on My Sleeve"	Gallagher and Lyle	6	19 June 1976	2
19 June 1976	2	"Jolene"	Dolly Parton	7	19 June 1976	1
19 June 1976	4	"Tonight's the Night (Gonna Be Alright)"	Rod Stewart	5	26 June 1976	2
19 June 1976	1	"Show Me the Way"	Peter Frampton	10	19 June 1976	1
26 June 1976	6	"Young Hearts Run Free"	Candi Staton	2	10 July 1976	1
26 June 1976	5	"Let's Stick Together"	Bryan Ferry	4	3 July 1976	1
26 June 1976	2	"The Boys Are Back in Town"	Thin Lizzy	8	3 July 1976	1
3 July 1976	2	"Leader of the Pack" ^{[G]}	The Shangri-Las	7	3 July 1976	1
10 July 1976	6	"The Roussos Phenomenon (EP)" (#9)	Demis Roussos	1	17 July 1976	1
10 July 1976	5	"Kiss and Say Goodbye"	The Manhattans	4	31 July 1976	1
10 July 1976	9	"A Little Bit More" (#5)	Dr. Hook ^{[H]}	2	24 July 1976	5
10 July 1976	10	"Don't Go Breaking My Heart" (#2)	Elton John & Kiki Dee	1	24 July 1976	6
17 July 1976	3	"You're My Best Friend"	Queen	7	17 July 1976	1
17 July 1976	5	"Misty Blue"	Dorothy Moore	5	7 August 1976	1
24 July 1976	2	"It Only Takes a Minute"	100 Ton and a Feather	9	24 July 1976	2
31 July 1976	6	"Jeans On" ^{[I]}	David Dundas	3	7 August 1976	3
31 July 1976	5	"Heaven Must Be Missing an Angel"	Tavares	4	14 August 1976	1
7 August 1976	4	"Now Is The Time"	Jimmy James & the Vagabonds	5	14 August 1976	1
7 August 1976	1	"Harvest for the World"	The Isley Brothers	10	7 August 1976	1
14 August 1976	4	"In Zaire"	Johnny Wakelin	4	21 August 1976	1
14 August 1976	3	"Doctor Kiss Kiss"	5000 Volts	8	14 August 1976	3
14 August 1976	4	"You Should Be Dancing" ^{[J]}	Bee Gees	5	11 September 1976	1
21 August 1976	5	"Let 'Em In"	Wings	2	28 August 1976	3
21 August 1976	1	"Here Comes the Sun"	Steve Harley & Cockney Rebel	10	21 August 1976	1
28 August 1976	4	"You Don't Have to Go"	The Chi-Lites	3	11 September 1976	1
4 September 1976	9	"Dancing Queen" (#4)	ABBA	1	4 September 1976	6
4 September 1976	2	"What I've Got in Mind"	Billie Jo Spears	4	4 September 1976	1
4 September 1976	1	"Extended Play (EP)"	Bryan Ferry	7	4 September 1976	1
4 September 1976	4	"The Killing of Georgie (Part I and II)"	Rod Stewart	2	18 September 1976	1
11 September 1976	2	"16 Bars"	The Stylistics	7	11 September 1976	2
11 September 1976	3	"Light of Experience (Doina De Jale)"	Gheorghe Zamfir	4	18 September 1976	1
11 September 1976	1	"You'll Never Find Another Love like Mine"	Lou Rawls	10	11 September 1976	1
18 September 1976	5	"Can't Get By Without You"	The Real Thing	2	25 September 1976	2
18 September 1976	4	"Aria"	Acker Bilk	5	18 September 1976	1
18 September 1976	4	"I Am a Cider Drinker"	The Wurzels	3	25 September 1976	1
18 September 1976	4	"I Only Want to Be With You"	Bay City Rollers	4	25 September 1976	1
25 September 1976	11	"Mississippi" (#3)	Pussycat	1	16 October 1976	4
25 September 1976	3	"Blinded by the Light"	Manfred Mann's Earth Band	6	25 September 1976	1
25 September 1976	4	"Dance Little Lady Dance"	Tina Charles	6	2 October 1976	1
2 October 1976	6	"Sailing" ^{[K]}	Rod Stewart	3	16 October 1976	2
2 October 1976	4	"Disco Duck"	Rick Dees & His Cast of Idiots	6	9 October 1976	2
16 October 1976	5	"Howzat"	Sherbet	4	16 October 1976	2
16 October 1976	5	"When Forever Has Gone"	Demis Roussos	2	23 October 1976	2
16 October 1976	1	"The Girl of My Best Friend"	Elvis Presley	9	16 October 1976	1
16 October 1976	1	"The Best Disco in Town"	The Ritchie Family	10	16 October 1976	1
23 October 1976	9	"If You Leave Me Now" (#6)	Chicago	1	13 November 1976	3
23 October 1976	5	"Hurt"	The Manhattans	4	6 November 1976	1
23 October 1976	4	"The Summer of My Life"	Simon May	7	23 October 1976	3
23 October 1976	5	"Don't Take Away the Music"	Tavares	4	13 November 1976	1
30 October 1976	2	"Dancing With the Captain"	Paul Nicholas	8	6 November 1976	1
6 November 1976	4	"Play That Funky Music"	Wild Cherry	7	13 November 1976	2
13 November 1976	6	"You Make Me Feel Like Dancing"	Leo Sayer	2	20 November 1976	1
13 November 1976	1	"Love and Affection"	Joan Armatrading	10	13 November 1976	1
20 November 1976	9	"Under the Moon of Love"	Showaddywaddy	1	4 December 1976	3
20 November 1976	4	"If Not You"	Dr. Hook ^{[H]}	5	20 November 1976	2
20 November 1976	1	"Substitute" ^{[L]}	The Who	7	20 November 1976	1
20 November 1976	1	"Couldn't Get It Right"	Climax Blues Band	10	20 November 1976	1
27 November 1976	7	"Somebody to Love"	Queen	2	11 December 1976	1
27 November 1976	6	"Love Me"	Yvonne Elliman	6	18 December 1976	1
27 November 1976	2	"Lost in France"	Bonnie Tyler	9	27 November 1976	2
27 November 1976	9	"Money, Money, Money"	ABBA	3	11 December 1976	4
4 December 1976	5	"Livin' Thing"	Electric Light Orchestra	4	18 December 1976	1
11 December 1976	6	"When a Child Is Born"	Johnny Mathis	1	25 December 1976	3
18 December 1976	6	"Portsmouth" ♦	Mike Oldfield	3	8 January 1977	1
18 December 1976	2	"Lean on Me" ^{[M]}	Mud	7	18 December 1976	1
25 December 1976	5	"Dr. Love" ♦	Tina Charles	4	22 January 1977	1
25 December 1976	5	"Living Next Door to Alice" ♦	Smokie	5	8 January 1977	1
25 December 1976	2	"Bionic Santa"	Chris Hill	10	25 December 1976	2

== Entries by artist ==
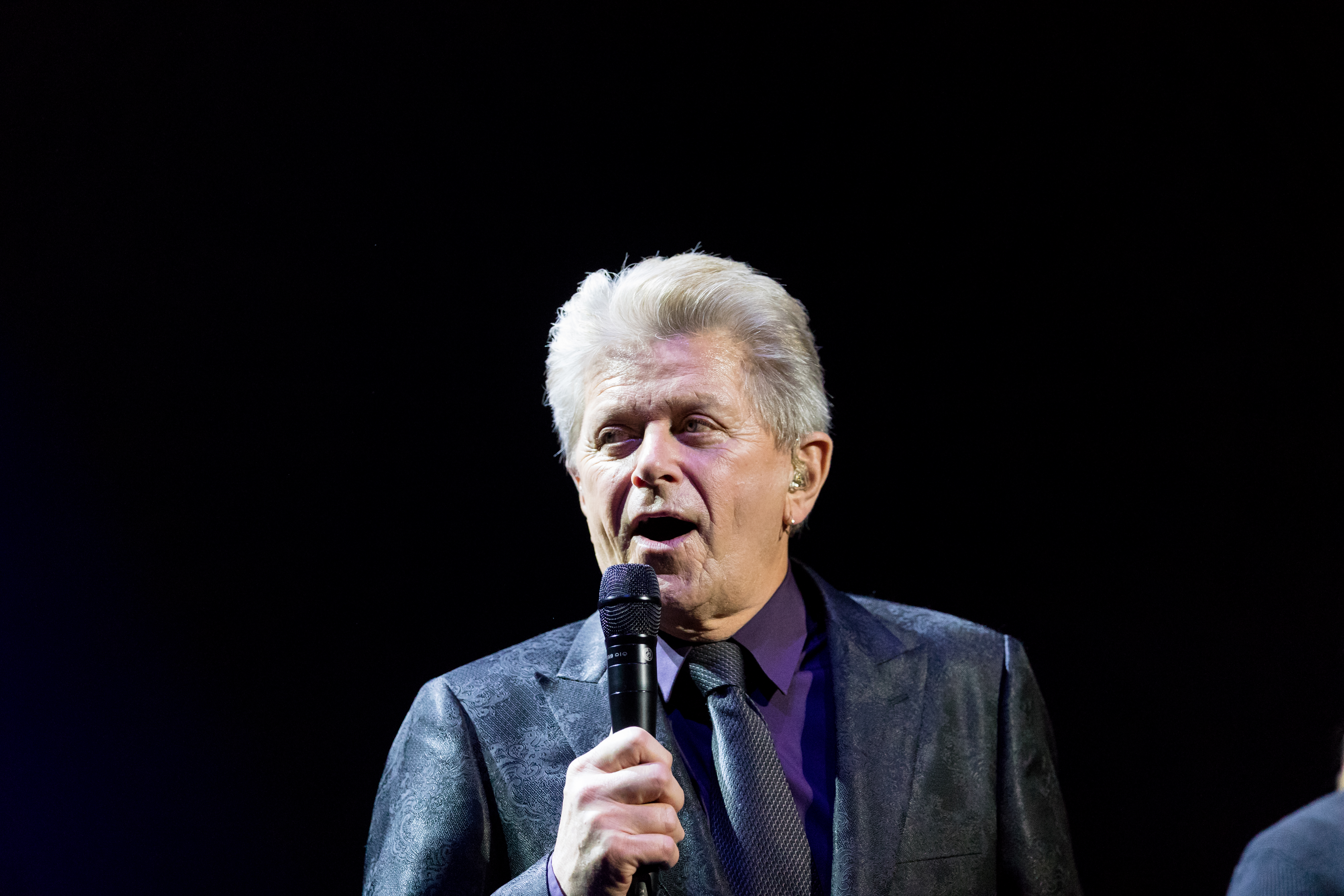
Peter Cetera, the bass player and vocalist of Chicago, wrote and provided lead vocals on the band's number-one hit "If You Leave Me Now", which became the sixth best selling single of 1976.

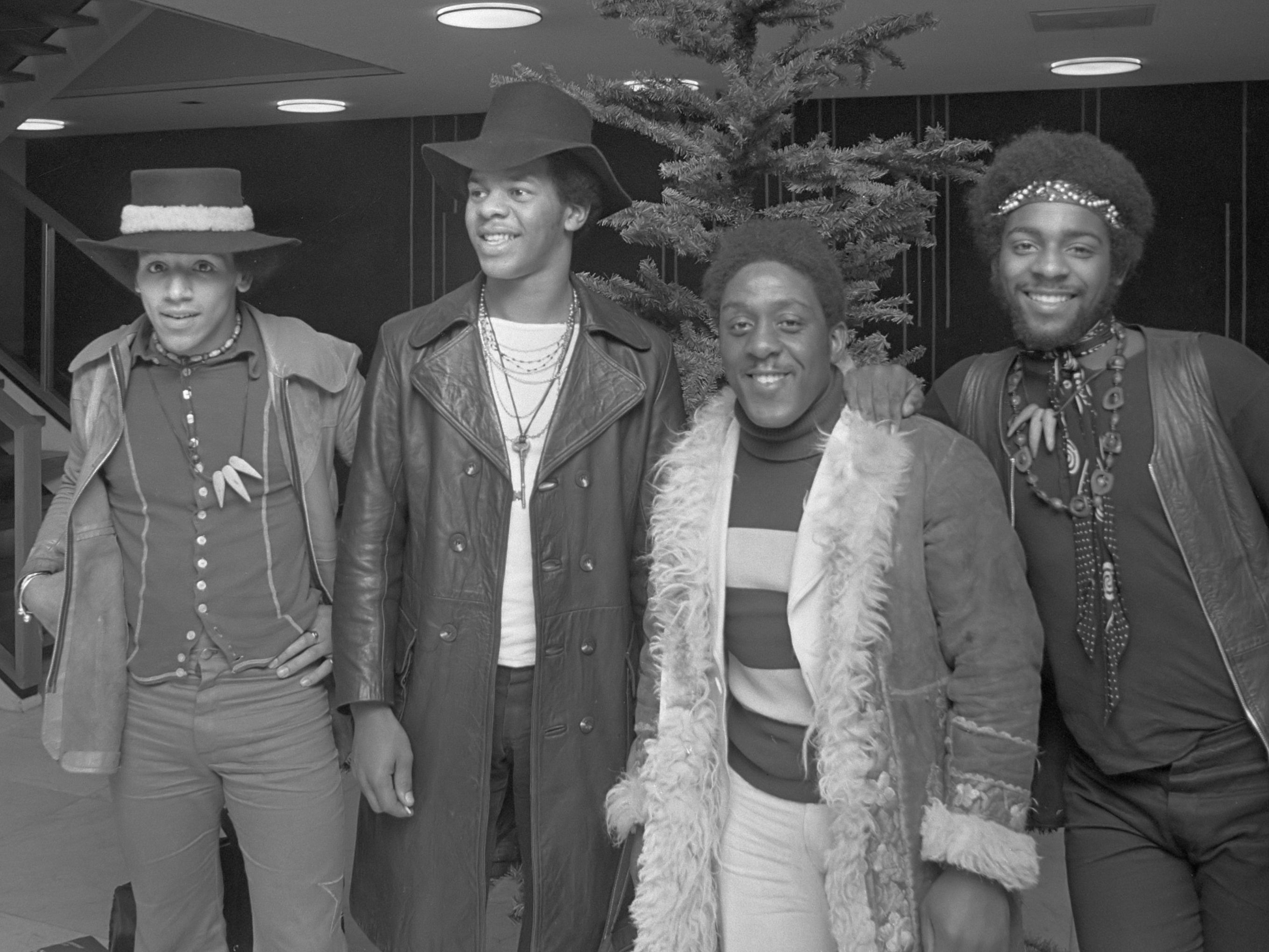
The Real Thing scored two top 10 entries this year, with their debut hit "You to Me Are Everything" spending three weeks at number-one.

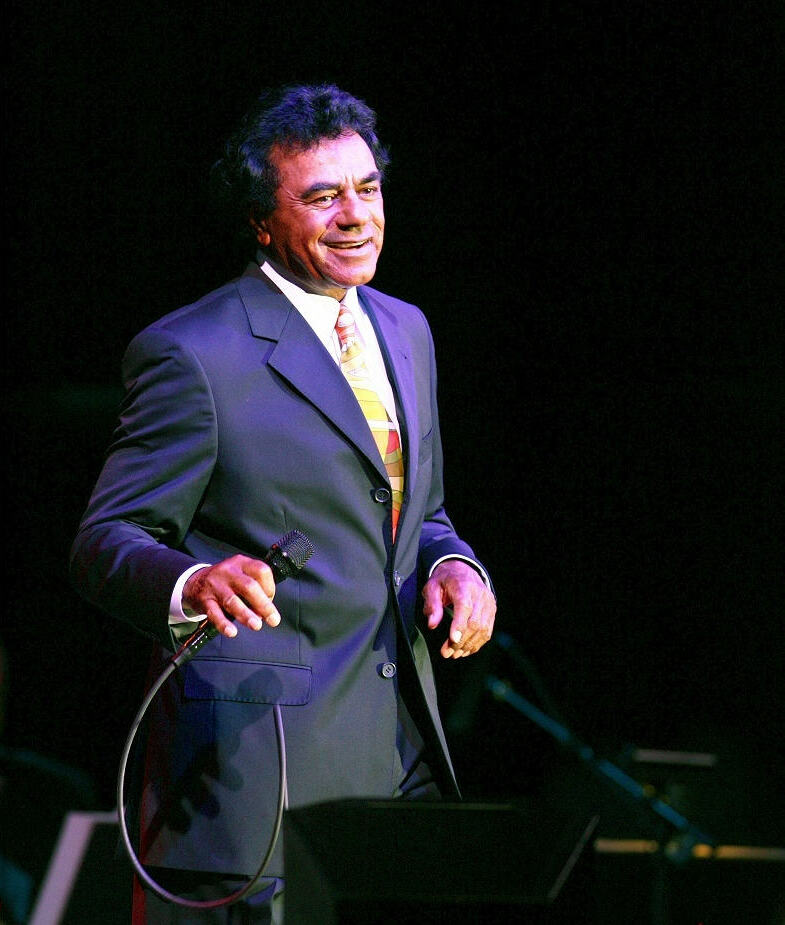
Johnny Mathis (pictured in 2006) achieved his only UK number-one single in 1976 with "When a Child Is Born (Soleado)", which became the year's Christmas number-one.

The following table shows artists who achieved two or more top 10 entries in 1976, including singles that reached their peak in 1975 or 1977. The figures include both main artists and featured artists, while appearances on ensemble charity records are also counted for each artist. The total number of weeks an artist spent in the top ten in 1976 is also shown.

Entries	Artist	Weeks	Singles
4	ABBA	30	"Dancing Queen", "Fernando", "Mamma Mia", "Money, Money, Money"
4	The Stylistics ^{[N]}	6	"16 Bars", "Can't Help Falling in Love", "Funky Weekend", "Na Na Is the Saddest Word"
3	Demis Roussos ^{[N]}	13	"Happy to Be on an Island in the Sun", "The Roussos Phenomenon (EP)", "When Forever Has Gone"
3	Queen ^{[N]}	14	"Bohemian Rhapsody", "Somebody to Love", "You're My Best Friend"
3	Rod Stewart	14	"Sailing", "The Killing of Georgie (Part I and II)", "Tonight's the Night (Gonna Be Alright)"
3	Tina Charles ^{[O]}	12	"Dance Little Lady Dance", "Dr. Love", "I Love to Love"
2	10cc	6	"Art for Art's Sake", "I'm Mandy Fly Me"
2	Barry White	7	"Let the Music Play", "You See the Trouble with Me"
2	Bay City Rollers	7	"I Only Want to Be With You", "Love Me Like I Love You"
2	Bryan Ferry	6	"Extended Play (EP)", "Let's Stick Together"
2	Chris Hill ^{[N]}	2	"Bionic Santa", "Renta Santa"
2	Diana Ross	6	"Love Hangover", "Theme from "Mahogany" (Do You Know Where You're Going To)"
2	Dr. Hook	13	"A Little Bit More", "If Not You"
2	Electric Light Orchestra	5	"Evil Woman", "Livin' Thing"
2	Elton John	13	"Don't Go Breaking My Heart", "Pinball Wizard"
2	The Four Seasons	10	"December, 1963 (Oh, What a Night)", "Silver Star"
2	Gallagher and Lyle	6	"Heart on My Sleeve", "I Wanna Stay with You"
2	The Manhattans	10	"Hurt", "Kiss and Say Goodbye"
2	Mike Oldfield ^{[O]}	6	"In Dulci Jubilo"/"On Horseback", "Portsmouth"
2	The Real Thing	12	"Can't Get By Without You", "You to Me Are Everything"
2	Sailor	8	"A Glass of Champagne", "Girls, Girls, Girls"
2	Tavares	10	"Heaven Must Be Missing an Angel", "Don't Take Away the Music"
2	The Who	2	"Squeeze Box", "Substitute"
2	Wings	11	"Let 'Em In", "Silly Love Songs"
2	The Wurzels	10	"I Am a Cider Drinker", "The Combine Harvester"

== Notes ==
- ^{a} "Portsmouth" reached its peak of number three on 8 January 1977 (week ending).
- ^{b} "Let's Twist Again" originally peaked at number 2 upon its initial release in 1962. "The Twist" originally peaked outside the top 10 at number 49 on its initial release in 1960. It reached the top 20 for the first time in 1962, peaking at number 14. In 1975, the two songs were re-issued together as a double A-sided single.
- ^{c} "Happy to Be On An Island in the Sun" re-entered the top 10 at number 10 on 17 January 1976 (week ending).
- ^{d} "Itchycoo Park" originally peaked at number 3 on its initial release in 1967.
- ^{e} "No Regrets" re-entered the top 10 at number 8 on 28 February 1976 (week ending).
- ^{f} "Save Your Kisses for Me" was the United Kingdom's winning entry at the Eurovision Song Contest in 1976.
- ^{g} "Leader of the Pack" originally peaked outside the top 10 at number 11 on its initial release in 1965. It first reached the top 10 in 1972, peaking at number 3.
- ^{h} Dr. Hook & the Medicine Show shortened their name to Dr. Hook in 1975 and reached the top 10 for the first time under this moniker in 1976.
- ^{i} "Jeans On" was used as a jingle for Brutus Jeans adverts in 1976 before being turned into a full-length song.
- ^{j} "You Should Be Dancing" re-entered the top 10 at number 5 on 11 September 1976 (week ending).
- ^{k} "Sailing" originally peaked at number-one upon its release in 1975. It re-entered the top 10 at number 7 on 2 October 1976 (week ending) for 6 weeks, as a result of it being utilized as the theme song for Sailor, a documentary series on HMS Ark Royal, which BBC1 aired for ten weeks from 5 August 1976.
- ^{l} "Substitute" originally peaked at number 5 on its initial release in 1966. It was re-released as a single in 1976 after being featured on the commercially successful compilation album The Story of The Who.
- ^{m} "Lean on Me" re-entered the top 10 at number 10 on 8 January 1977 (week ending).
- ^{n} Figure includes single that peaked in 1975.
- ^{o} Figure includes single that peaked in 1977.

== See also ==
- 1976 in British music
- List of number-one singles from the 1970s (UK)
