= Breakaway (Gallagher and Lyle album) =

Studio album by Gallagher and Lyle
- Released: February 1976
- Genre: Rock
- Label: A&M
- Producer: David Kershenbaum

Gallagher and Lyle chronology
The Last Cowboy (1974)	Breakaway (1976)	Love on the Airwaves (1977)

Breakaway is the fifth studio album by Scottish duo Gallagher and Lyle. The title track became a hit for Art Garfunkel, and "I Wanna Stay with You" was a U.S. Pop (No. 49) hit, a U.S. AC (No. 27) hit, and reached number six on the United Kingdom Singles Chart. A second hit from the album, "Heart on My Sleeve", also charted in both Canada and the U.S., reaching the Top 20 on the U.S. Easy Listening chart, number six in the United Kingdom and number two in the Irish charts. The title track was originally recorded in the previous year by American singer Art Garfunkel (formerly of Simon & Garfunkel) for his second solo album of the same title and was released as a single; it was a hit in the US and Canada that year and into early 1976, but failed to chart in Britain. It was re-issued in Britain in September 1976, in an attempt to capitalize on the recent release of Gallagher and Lyle's own version as a single – which had been a moderate hit in the UK and a Top 10 hit in Ireland – but again failed to chart. Gallagher and Lyle's version of the title track re-entered the Irish charts in 1983 at a slightly lower position at number 10. "Heart on My Sleeve" would later be covered by former Roxy Music frontman Bryan Ferry on his album Let's Stick Together in late 1976, and was a Top 10 hit in Australia and a minor hit in the US. The track "Stay Young" was later covered by American country singer Don Williams on his 1983 album Yellow Moon; released as a single, it was a Top 10 country hit in the US and Canada that year and into 1984. The track "I Wanna Stay with You" was covered by Scottish dance group Undercover on their 1992 debut album Check Out the Groove; released as a single in early 1993, it became a Top 40 hit in parts of Europe.

== Track listing ==
All tracks composed by Benny Gallagher and Graham Lyle

1. "Breakaway" – 4:05
2. "Stay Young" – 3:41
3. "I Wanna Stay with You" – 3:00
4. "Heart on My Sleeve" – 3:23
5. "Fifteen Summers" – 4:08
6. "Sign of the Times" – 3:41
7. "If I Needed Someone" – 4:33
8. "Storm in My Soul" – 2:24
9. "Rockwriter" – 3:09
10. "Northern Girl" – 2:52

== Charts ==
=== Weekly charts ===
Chart (1976)	Peak position
Australian Albums (Kent Music Report)	67
Canada Top Albums/CDs (RPM)	72
UK Albums (Official Charts)	6

=== Year-end charts ===
Chart (1976)	Position
UK Albums (OCC)	31

== Personnel ==
- Andy Fairweather Low - additional vocals on "Heart on My Sleeve", "If I Needed Someone" and "Storm in My Soul"
- Ray Duffy – drums
- Geoff Emerick – engineer
- Benny Gallagher – vocals, keyboards, guitar, accordion
- Alan Hornall – bass
- Jimmy Jewell – saxophone
- Billy Livsey – keyboards
- Graham Lyle – vocals, guitar, mandolin
- John Mumford – trombone, euphonium, timbales
- Brian Rogers - string arrangements
- Gered Mankowitz - photography
