= Check Out the Groove =

Studio album by Undercover
- Released: 1992
- Label: PWL International
- Producer: Steve Mac

Undercover chronology
| Check Out the Groove (1992) | Ain't No Stopping Us (1994) |

Professional ratings
Review scores
| Source | Rating |
|---|---|
| Select | 1/5 medals |

Check Out the Groove is the debut album by British dance group Undercover, released in 1992 by PWL International. The album contains mostly cover versions of songs from the 1970s and 1980s.

== Singles ==
A cover of "Baker Street", originally performed by Gerry Rafferty, was the first single released from the album. This reached number two in the UK singles chart and the top 10 of many other countries around Europe. "Never Let Her Slip Away", originally by Andrew Gold, was the second single, reaching number five in the UK as well as the top 10 of several other European charts. "I Wanna Stay with You", originally by Gallagher and Lyle, was the third single released from the album, reaching number 28 in the UK as well as charting in several other European countries.

== Track listing ==
| No. | Title | Writer(s) | Original artist | Length |
|---|---|---|---|---|
| 1. | "Baker Street" | Gerry Rafferty | Gerry Rafferty | 4:10 |
| 2. | "Never Let Her Slip Away" | Andrew Gold | Andrew Gold | 3:32 |
| 3. | "Lovetown" | Len Barry; Bobby Eli | Booker Newberry III | 6:02 |
| 4. | "September" | Maurice White; Al McKay; Allee Willis | Earth, Wind & Fire | 3:34 |
| 5. | "How Long" | Paul Carrack | Ace | 4:16 |
| 6. | "Sha Bang" | John Matthews; Jon Jules; Steve McCutcheon | new song | 5:47 |
| 7. | "The Way It Is" | Bruce Hornsby | Bruce Hornsby and the Range | 3:56 |
| 8. | "Waiting for a Girl Like You" | Mick Jones; Lou Gramm | Foreigner | 5:24 |
| 9. | "I Wanna Stay with You" | Benny Gallagher; Graham Lyle | Gallagher and Lyle | 3:38 |
| 10. | "Check Out the Groove" | Rodney Brown; Willie Lester | Bobby Thurston | 6:09 |
| 11. | "Never Too Much" | Luther Vandross | Luther Vandross | 4:52 |
| 12. | "Sha Do" | Matthews; Jules; McCutcheon | new song | 3:28 |

== Personnel ==
Adapted from the album's liner notes.

=== Musicians ===
Undercover

- John Matthews – vocals, backing vocals
- Steve Mac – keyboards, backing vocals
- Jon Jules – bass guitar

Additional musicians

- Tracy Ackerman – backing vocals
- Guy Barker – trumpet
- Joe Becket – percussion
- Chris Laws – drums
- Tim Laws – guitar
- Phil Todd – saxophone
- Nigel Wright – trombone

=== Production ===
- Produced by Steve Mac
- Sleeve design: David Howells
- Photography: Mike Smallcombe, assisted by Debs & Peter Sherrard
- Styling: Shazza
- Makeup: Katya Thomas

== Charts ==
| Chart (1992–93) | Peak position |
|---|---|
| Austrian Albums (Ö3 Austria) | 29 |
| Dutch Albums (Album Top 100) | 34 |
| German Albums (Offizielle Top 100) | 56 |
| UK Albums (OCC) | 26 |
