= I Wanna Stay with You =

Single by Gallagher & Lyle

from the album Breakaway
- B-side: "Fifteen Summers"
- Released: April 1976
- Genre: Pop, Easy Listening
- Label: A&M
- Songwriter(s): Benny Gallagher, Graham Lyle

Gallagher & Lyle singles chronology
"I Wanna Stay with You" (1976)	"Heart on My Sleeve" (1976)

Music video
- Gallagher and Lyle - I Wanna Stay With You • TopPop on YouTube

"I Wanna Stay with You" is a song written and originally recorded by Scottish duo Gallagher & Lyle in 1976. It reached number six in the UK and number five in Ireland. The song was a modest hit in the United States and Canada.

== Charts ==
=== Weekly charts ===
Chart (1976)	Peak position
Australia (Kent Music Report)	48
Canada RPM Adult Contemporary	46
Canada RPM Top Singles	90
Ireland (IRMA)	5
UK Singles Chart	6
US Billboard Hot 100	49
US Billboard Easy Listening	27
US Cash Box Top 100	79

=== Year-end charts ===
Chart (1976)	Rank
UK	76

== Undercover cover ==
"I Wanna Stay with You"

Single by Undercover

from the album Check Out the Groove
- Released: 25 January 1993
- Length: 3:36
- Label: PWL
- Songwriter(s): Benny Gallagher, Graham Lyle
- Producer(s): Steve Mac

Undercover singles chronology
"Never Let Her Slip Away" (1992)	"I Wanna Stay with You" (1993)	"The Way It Is" (1993)

Scottish dance group Undercover recorded "I Wanna Stay with You" and included on their album Check Out the Groove. They released it as a single in January 1993, and it became a top-40 hit in parts of Europe.

=== Charts ===
Chart (1993)	Peak position
Belgium (Ultratop 50 Flanders)	14
Europe (Eurochart Hot 100)	66
Iceland (Íslenski Listinn Topp 40)	19
Ireland (IRMA)	8
Netherlands (Single Top 100)	43
UK Singles (OCC)	28
