= Hughie Flint =

English retired drummer (born 1940)

- Born: 15 March 1940 (age 86); Manchester, Lancashire, England
- Genres: Rock
- Occupation: Drummer
- Years active: 1960s–1981
- Formerly of: John Mayall & the Bluesbreakers; McGuinness Flint; The Blues Band

Hughie Flint (born 15 March 1940) is an English retired drummer, known for his stint in John Mayall & the Bluesbreakers during the early 1960s, mainly for his contribution towards their album Blues Breakers with Eric Clapton (1966).

In the 1970s, Flint was known for being one half of rock duo McGuinness Flint, with Tom McGuinness of Manfred Mann. The two continued working with each other after McGuinness Flint disbanded in 1975, being subsequently associated with The Blues Band.

Flint retired from music after leaving the Blues Band in 1981. He worked as a college porter until he retired from that job in 2007.

== Career ==
=== 1964–1966: John Mayall & the Bluesbreakers ===
Flint joined John Mayall & the Bluesbreakers in the early 1960s, replacing Martin Hart, who had played percussion on their first single in 1964. Flint played in the Bluesbreakers on and off for the next two years (1964–1966), adding a distinctive aspect to their blues-based sound partly through his love of jazz. He appeared on their albums John Mayall Plays John Mayall (1965) and Blues Breakers with Eric Clapton (1966, also known as The Beano Album), one of their most iconic albums due to its feature of Eric Clapton.

Flint then left to play alongside Alexis Korner and Savoy Brown; his place in the group was taken by Aynsley Dunbar.

=== 1970–1975: McGuinness Flint ===
In 1970 Flint formed McGuinness Flint with Tom McGuinness, former guitarist and bassist with Manfred Mann. They reached number 2 in the UK Singles Chart with "When I'm Dead And Gone", which was followed in 1971 by another hit single, "Malt and Barley Blues", which peaked at number 5. They also released their self-titled debut album in 1970, which reached the Top 10 of the UK Albums Chart in 1971. However the early success of the group proved to be short-lived. Despite featuring the production skills of Glyn Johns and the accompaniment of pianist Nicky Hopkins, their second album Happy Birthday, Ruthy Baby proved to be the end of the original line-up.

Multi-instrumentalist band members Benny Gallagher and Graham Lyle, who also wrote most of the songs, left the group following its release. Flint and McGuinness teamed up with Dennis Coulson and Dixie Dean to release the album Lo and Behold in 1972, which consisted solely of obscure Bob Dylan covers. Shortly after this Coulson left. Despite the release of two further albums and a Greatest Hits collection in 1973, the band split in 1975.

Flint played with the Bonzo Dog Doo-Dah Band in November 1971 and appeared with them until their final album, Let's Make Up And Be Friendly, released in March 1972.

=== 1977–1981: The Blues Band and music retirement ===
In 1977 Flint was the drummer and bodhrán player on the album Suburban Ethnia by the band Chanter.

Flint also featured on records by Georgie Fame, Jack Dupree and Tom Newman amongst others.

Flint's last band-based venture was The Blues Band, a supergroup whose other members were Dave Kelly, Gary Fletcher, McGuinness and another Manfred Mann veteran, singer Paul Jones. Their debut The Official Bootleg Album was released in 1980, and Flint also appeared on their follow-up albums Ready (1980) and Itchy Feet (1981) before departing.

Flint left the music scene after leaving The Blues Band.

== Personal life ==
After departing from music, Flint took up a job working as a porter at Mansfield College, Oxford, from where he retired in 2007.

In 1995 Flint appeared in the BBC television documentary Rock Family Trees to discuss the history of the Bluesbreakers and the many offshoots of the band.

== Discography ==
John Mayall & the Bluesbreakers

- John Mayall Plays John Mayall (1965)
- Blues Breakers with Eric Clapton (1966)

(See more at John Mayall discography)

McGuinness Flint

- McGuinness Flint (1970)
- Happy Birthday, Ruthy Baby (1971)
- Lo and Behold (1972)
- Rainbow (1973)
- C'est la Vie (1974)

(See more at McGuinness Flint)

The Blues Band

- The Official Bootleg Album (1980)
- Ready (1980)
- Itchy Feet (1981)

(See more at The Blues Band)
