= Breakaway (Art Garfunkel album) =

Studio album by Art Garfunkel
- Released: October 14, 1975
- Recorded: 1975
- Studios: A&M Studios (Hollywood); Record Plant (Los Angeles); The Village Recorder (Los Angeles); Cherokee Studios (Los Angeles); Record Plant (New York City); The Hit Factory (New York City); A&R Recording (New York City); AIR Studios (London); Marquee Studios (London); Muscle Shoals Sound Studio (Sheffield, Alabama)
- Genre: Soft rock
- Length: 36:46
- Label: Columbia
- Producers: Richard Perry (except "My Little Town" produced by Paul Simon, Art Garfunkel and Phil Ramone)

Art Garfunkel chronology
Angel Clare (1973)	Breakaway (1975)	Watermark (1977)

Singles from Breakaway
- 1. "I Only Have Eyes for You" Released: August 1975; 2. "My Little Town" Released: October 1975; 3. "Break Away" Released: December 1975

Professional ratings
Review scores
Source	Rating
Allmusic	3/5 stars
Rolling Stone	(Mixed)

Breakaway is the second solo studio album by Art Garfunkel. It was released in 1975 on Columbia Records. It was produced by Richard Perry who has produced albums for other artists such as Carly Simon and Ringo Starr. It includes three Top 40 singles: "I Only Have Eyes for You" (US #18, UK #1), "Break Away" (US #39) and the Simon & Garfunkel reunion duet, "My Little Town" which peaked at #9. "I Only Have Eyes For You" is noted also for being Garfunkel's first #1 single in the UK. Breakaway has proven to be Garfunkel's most successful solo album; although peaking at number 7 in the United States, which was lower than his first album Angel Clare (US #5), it has been certified platinum by RIAA.

== Album cover ==
The cover consists of a Norman Seeff photograph taken at a staged photo shoot at the Dan Tana's Restaurant at 9071 Santa Monica Boulevard in Hollywood. On the left is actress Helena Kallianiotes, Garfunkel in the middle, and on the right is Laurie Bird who was then dating Garfunkel. There has been speculation that the art was inspiration for Leonard Cohen's Death of a Ladies' Man cover from 1977, but there has never been confirmation by either artist, nor their photographers.

== Release history ==
In addition to the usual 2-channel stereo version the album was also released by Columbia Records in 1975 in a 4-channel quadraphonic version on LP record and 8-track tape. The LP version was encoded in the SQ matrix format.

The album was reissued in the UK in 2018 by Dutton Vocalion on the Super Audio CD format. This edition contains both the stereo and quadraphonic mixes.

== Track listing ==
Side one
No.	Title	Writer(s)	Length
1.	"I Believe (When I Fall in Love It Will Be Forever)"	Stevie Wonder, Yvonne Wright	3:47
2.	"Rag Doll"	Steve Eaton	3:03
3.	"Break Away"	Benny Gallagher, Graham Lyle	3:31
4.	"Disney Girls"	Bruce Johnston	4:32
5.	"Waters of March"	Antônio Carlos Jobim	3:34

Side two
No.	Title	Writer(s)	Length
6.	"My Little Town"	Paul Simon	3:51
7.	"I Only Have Eyes for You"	Al Dubin, Harry Warren	3:36
8.	"Looking for the Right One"	Stephen Bishop	3:20
9.	"99 Miles from L.A."	Albert Hammond, Hal David	3:29
10.	"The Same Old Tears on a New Background"	Bishop	3:42
Total length:			36:46

== Personnel ==
- Art Garfunkel – vocals, backing vocals (4)
- Larry Knechtel – acoustic piano (1), electric piano (2)
- Andrew Gold – electric piano (1), acoustic guitar (1, 2, 4, 8), electric guitar (1, 7, 8), ukulele (4), acoustic piano (7), drums (7)
- Bill Payne – electric piano (3, 5, 9), synthesizers (3, 5), Mellotron (5)
- Barry Beckett – acoustic piano (6)
- Nicky Hopkins – electric piano (7)
- Steve Cropper – electric guitar (3)
- Lon Van Eaton – acoustic guitar (3)
- Louis Shelton – guitar (5), acoustic guitar (9)
- Pete Carr – electric guitar (6)
- Paul Simon – acoustic guitar (6), vocals (6)
- Lee Ritenour – acoustic guitar (9)
- Leland Sklar – bass guitar (1)
- Joe Osborn – bass guitar (2, 4, 7, 8, 10)
- Klaus Voormann – bass guitar (3)
- Max Bennett – bass guitar (5)
- David Hood – bass guitar (6)
- Reinie Press – bass guitar (9)
- Russ Kunkel – drums (1, 4, 8)
- Denny Seiwell – drums (2, 9)
- Jim Keltner – drums (3)
- Rick Shlosser – drums (3)
- John Guerin – drums (5)
- Roger Hawkins – drums (6)
- Jim Gordon – drums (10)
- Ralph MacDonald – percussion (2)
- Joe Clayton – percussion (3)
- Del Newman – horn arrangements (1, 7, 9), string arrangements (1, 7, 9, 10), conductor (1, 7, 9, 10), flute arrangements (9), woodwind arrangements (10)
- Richard Anthony Hewson – string arrangements and conductor (2, 4)
- David Matthews – horn arrangements (6)
- John Barlow Jarvis – backing vocals (2), acoustic piano (8, 10)
- David Crosby – backing vocals (3)
- Bruce Johnston – backing vocals (3, 4), acoustic piano (4), whistle (4)
- Graham Nash – backing vocals (3)
- Toni Tennille – backing vocals (3, 4)
- Jon Joyce – backing vocals (4)
- Stephen Bishop – backing vocals (7), acoustic guitar (8)

=== Production ===
- Richard Perry – producer (1–5, 7–10)
- Art Garfunkel – associate producer (1–5, 7–10), producer (6)
- Paul Simon – producer (6)
- Phil Ramone – producer (6), remix engineer (6)
- Will Roper – engineer (1, 4, 7–10)
- Peter Swettenham – engineer (1, 4, 7–10)
- Bill Schnee – remix engineer (1–5, 7–10)
- Brooks Arthur – recording engineer (3, 5)
- Ellis Sorkin - assistant engineer A&M
- Dee Robb – recording engineer (3, 5)
- Jerry Masters – recording engineer (6)
- Doug Sax – mastering at The Mastering Lab (Hollywood, California)
- Kathie Carey – production coordinator
- John Brogna – design
- Ron Coro – design
- Norman Seeff – photography
- Larry Emerine – inner sleeve photography
- Helena Kallianiotes – cover model

== Charts ==
=== Weekly charts ===
Chart (1975–76)	Peak position
Australia (Kent Music Report)	26
Canadian RPM Albums Chart	6
Dutch Mega Albums Chart	16
New Zealand Albums Chart	31
Norwegian VG-lista Albums Chart	18
Swedish Albums Chart	21
UK Albums Chart	7
U.S. Billboard 200	7

=== Year-end charts ===
Chart (1975)	Position
Canadian Albums Chart	64
Chart (1976)	Position
Canadian Albums Chart	53
U.S. Billboard Year-End	50

=== Certifications ===
Region	Certification	Certified units/sales
United Kingdom (BPI)	Gold	100,000^{^}
United States (RIAA)	Platinum	1,000,000^{^}
^{^} Shipments figures based on certification alone.
