= McGuinness Flint =

English rock band (1970–1975)

- Origin: England
- Genres: Folk rock; blues rock; country rock
- Years active: 1970–1975
- Labels: Capitol, DJM, Bronze
- Past members: Tom McGuinness; Hughie Flint; Dennis Coulson; Benny Gallagher; Graham Lyle; Dixie Dean; Lou Stonebridge; Jim Evans

McGuinness Flint was a rock band formed in 1970 by Tom McGuinness, a bassist and guitarist with Manfred Mann, and Hughie Flint, former drummer with John Mayall; plus vocalist and keyboard player Dennis Coulson, and multi-instrumentalists and singer-songwriters Benny Gallagher and Graham Lyle.

== Career ==
Their first single "When I'm Dead and Gone" reached No. 2 on the UK Singles Chart at the end of 1970, No. 47 on the Billboard pop chart and No.3 5 on the Cashbox pop chart in the U.S., No. 5 in Ireland, and No. 31 in Canada.) The debut album McGuinness Flint also made the Top 10 of the UK Albums Chart. In 1999, it received another outing, in the soundtrack of the film, East is East.

A follow-up single, "Malt and Barley Blues", was a UK No. 5 hit in 1971 and peaked at No.15 in Ireland, but the group floundered under the pressures of instant success, being required to record a second album and reproduce their recorded sound adequately on stage, which resulted in disappointing concerts, then a series of illnesses among the band members cancelled most of the concerts on their first tour. According to McGuinness, at this time the band consisted of two groups of close-knit friends, the first being Flint, McGuinness, and Coulson, and the other being Gallagher and Lyle. Though these two units generally got along well, a key disagreement between them was that the first group felt the band should focus on touring and performing, while the Gallagher/Lyle camp felt they should focus on songwriting and recording.

The second album Happy Birthday Ruthy Baby failed to chart, as did the title track when released as a single, but contained some Gallagher and Lyle songs, notably "Sparrow", which attracted cover versions.

Gallagher and Lyle left towards the end of 1971 to record as a duo, and would enjoy major success in 1976 with their hit-laden fifth album Breakaway. McGuinness Flint would continue to play some of their compositions in live performances. After several temporary members came and went, including comedian Neil Innes on piano, the group recruited bassist Dixie Dean on a permanent basis, and recorded Lo and Behold, an album of Bob Dylan songs (which had not yet been officially recorded and released by the writer himself). This album was credited to Coulson, Dean, McGuinness, Flint, and was issued in 1972. A single "Let The People Go" was banned by the BBC as it related to the Ulster crisis, a fate which also befell a contemporary single by Wings, "Give Ireland Back to the Irish".

Coulson left to record a solo album for Elektra Records (which Gallagher and Lyle contributed to), and was replaced by Lou Stonebridge (ex-Paladin) on keyboards and Jim Evans on guitar. This new line-up recorded two further albums. Neither of these recordings sold well and the group broke up in 1975. A splinter group, Stonebridge McGuinness, had a minor hit in 1979 with "Oo-Eeh Baby" (No. 54 in the UK) and released the album Corporate Madness on RCA Records the following year. This group proved short-lived, however, and afterwards McGuinness and Flint both joined The Blues Band, which featured former Manfred Mann vocalist and harmonica player, Paul Jones. Stonebridge had a stint in early 80s classic soul revival outfit The Dance Band, who recorded for the PRT-distributed Double D label.

McGuinness briefly reunited with Graham Lyle in 1983 to form the Lyle McGuinness Band, a short-lived folk rock ensemble that recorded a single, "Elise", and an album, Acting on Impulse, for the independent Cool King label; in Germany, this set was granted a major label release on Polydor. Lyle's songwriting career exploded soon afterwards with the worldwide success of his composition "What's Love Got to Do with It?" for Tina Turner, ensuring that the Lyle McGuinness Band would not continue. Diamond Recordings reissued the album on CD in 1997 as Elise, Elise, with the addition of the non-album single plus a previously unreleased song.

McGuinness continues to record and perform as a member of both The Blues Band and The Manfreds, the latter outfit being an amalgamation of 1960s Manfred Mann members that has operated since 1992.

Dennis Coulson died on 15 January 2006.

== Discography ==
=== Albums ===
==== Studio albums ====
Title	Album details	Peak chart positions
Title	Album details	UK
McGuinness Flint	Released: 4 December 1970; Label: Capitol	9
Happy Birthday, Ruthy Baby	Released: July 1971; Label: Capitol	—
Lo and Behold	Released: September 1972; Label: DJM; Credited to Coulson, Dean, McGuinness, Flint	—
Rainbow	Released: September 1973; Label: Bronze	—
C'est la Vie	Released: October 1974; Label: Bronze	—
"—" denotes releases that did not chart or were not released in that territory.

==== Compilation albums ====
Title	Album details
The Capitol Years	Released: 7 November 1996; Label: Capitol
Malt & Barley Blues	Released: November 2002; Label: Hux; Collection of BBC recordings
McGuinness Flint in Session at the BBC	Released: October 2009; Label: EMI; Collection of BBC recordings

=== Singles ===
Title	Year	Peak chart positions											Album
Title	Year	UK	AUS	BE (FLA)	BE (WA)	CAN	GER	IRE	NL	NZ	NOR	US	Album
"When I'm Dead and Gone"	1970	2	39	14	21	31	6	5	12	14	9	47	McGuinness Flint
"Malt and Barley Blues"	1971	5	38	—	—	—	37	15	— (Note: "Malt and Barley Blues" did not enter the Dutch Single Top 100 (then a Top 30), but did peak at number 5 on the Single Tip chart.)	—	—	—	Non-album single
"Happy Birthday Ruthy Baby"	1971	—	49	—	—	—	—	—	—	—	—	—	Happy Birthday, Ruthy Baby
"Let the People Go"	1972	—	—	—	—	—	—	—	— (Note: "Let the People Go" did not enter the Dutch Single Top 100 (then a Top 30), but did peak at number 10 on the Single Tip chart.)	—	—	—	Non-album single
"Lay Down Your Weary Tune" (as Coulson, Dean, McGuinness and Flint)	1972	—	—	—	—	—	—	—	—	—	—	—	Lo and Behold
"Ride on My Rainbow"	1973	—	—	—	—	—	—	—	—	—	—	—	Rainbow
"C'est la Vie"	1974	—	—	—	—	—	—	—	—	—	—	—	C'est la Vie
"—" denotes releases that did not chart or were not released in that territory.

== See also ==
- List of performances on Top of the Pops
- List of performers on Top of the Pops
- Christmas number two
