= When I'm Dead and Gone =

Single by McGuinness Flint

from the album McGuinness Flint
- B-side: "Lazy Afternoon"
- Released: November 1970
- Recorded: 1970
- Studio: Olympic Studios, Barnes, London
- Genre: Folk rock, country rock, blues rock
- Label: Capitol
- Songwriters: Bernard Gallagher, Graham Lyle (A-side); Hughie Flint, Tom McGuinness, Dennis Coulson (B-side)
- Producer: Glyn Johns

Official audio
- "When I'm Dead and Gone" (remastered) on YouTube

"When I'm Dead and Gone" is a song written by Benny Gallagher and Graham Lyle, released as a single in 1970, on the Capitol label, by McGuinness Flint.

== Background ==
"When I'm Dead and Gone" was one of the first hit singles to feature prominent use of mandolin, played by Lyle, who also took lead vocal. Gallagher played bass guitar and sang tenor harmony, while both he and Lyle also played kazoos and guitarist Tom McGuinness played the dobro solo.

According to McGuinness, "You can get to number one in England and sell 200,000 total. But [the single's release] was over Christmas and it sold 400,000 ... it sold a couple of hundred thousand in America, 100,000 in Germany, 50,000 in Japan."

After Gallagher and Lyle left the group and enjoyed a successful career as a duo, they featured the song regularly on stage - though usually in the lower key of C, rather than the original key of D, and eschewing kazoos in favour of a harmonica, which Gallagher used on a harness. This treatment of the song can be heard on the duo's 1999 album Live In Concert.

== Album personnel ==
- Tom McGuinness – guitar, bass
- Benny Gallagher – guitar, bass, keyboards, vocals
- Graham Lyle – guitar, mandolin, bass, vocals
- Dennis Coulson – keyboards, vocals
- Hughie Flint – percussion

== Chart performance ==
It was recorded and released in November 1970 as the debut single by McGuinness Flint, peaked at No. 2 in the UK charts the following month, and reached No. 47 in the US charts in February 1971. The song also peaked at No.5 in Ireland, No. 6 in West Germany, No. 39 in Australia, No.34 in Canada, and No. 4 in Singapore.

== Cover versions ==
- Bob Summers recorded a cover which reached number 18 on the Bubbling Under Hot 100 (number 118 on the Hot 100) in 1971.
- The German band Fury In The Slaughterhouse from Hannover recorded a cover version on their album Mono in 1993 which reached number 44 in the German charts in 1994 for 11 weeks.
- Joe Brown recorded a cover on his 2012 The Ukulele Album.
- Def Leppard covered the song for their 2006 album of cover songs, Yeah!. The song was used as a bonus track for copies of the CD sold at Target stores.
