= Undercover (dance group) =

English dance music group

- Origin: London, United Kingdom
- Genres: Electronic, dance
- Years active: 1991–2004
- Label: PWL International
- Past members: John Matthews; Jon Jules; Steve Mac

Undercover is a British dance music group which was formed in 1991 and had three UK top-30 hits, two of them top-five, in 1992. The group's vocalist, John Matthews, continues to perform solo as Undercover across the UK, Europe and South America. The keyboard player, Steve Mac, went on to become a songwriter and music producer for other artists. Bass guitarist Jon Jules worked in the UK soul music scene as a DJ, radio presenter and event organiser.

== Overview ==
The group's first single, a cover version of Gerry Rafferty's 1978 UK/US chart success "Baker Street", was their biggest hit, reaching No. 2 in the UK Singles Chart in September 1992.

Undercover released five more chart singles. The group's second single, a cover of Andrew Gold's "Never Let Her Slip Away", also originally a 1978 track, reached No. 5 and stayed in the charts in the United Kingdom for 11 weeks. After the success of these two singles, an album, Check Out the Groove, was released, reaching No. 26 in the UK Albums Chart. "I Wanna Stay with You" (a cover of the Gallagher and Lyle song) and "Lovesick", both from 1993, managed No. 28 and No. 62 respectively.

In 1994, Undercover released a new single, "Best Friend", and their second album, Ain't No Stopping Us.

== Discography ==
=== Studio albums ===
Title	Album details	Peak chart positions				
Title	Album details	UK	AUT	EUR	GER	NED
Check Out the Groove	Released: 18 September 1992; Label: PWL International; Formats: LP, CS, CD	26	29	73	56	34
Ain't No Stopping Us	Released: 1994; Label: PWL International; Formats: LP, CS, CD	—	—	—	—	—
"—" denotes items that did not chart or were not released in that territory.

=== Singles ===
Year	Title	Peak chart positions										Certifications	Album
Year	Title	UK	AUT	BEL	DEN	EUR	GER	IRE	NED	SWE	SWI	Certifications	Album
1992	"Baker Street"	2	3	2	4	4	3	2	3	7	2	GER: Gold	Check Out the Groove
1992	"Never Let Her Slip Away"	5	23	3	8	11	16	2	8	23	—		Check Out the Groove
1993	"I Wanna Stay with You"	28	—	14	—	66	—	8	43	—	—		Check Out the Groove
1993	"The Way It Is"	—	—	32	—	—	—	—	—	—	—		Check Out the Groove
1993	"Lovesick" (featuring John Matthews)	62	—	—	—	—	—	—	—	—	—		Ain't No Stoppin' Us
1994	"Best Friend"	79	—	—	—	—	67	—	—	—	—		Ain't No Stoppin' Us
1995	"Every Breath You Take"	—	—	—	—	—	—	—	—	—	—		Non-album singles
1996	"Bring Back Your Love"	—	—	—	—	—	—	—	—	—	—		Non-album singles
2000	"If You Leave Me Now"	—	—	—	—	—	—	—	—	—	—		Non-album singles
2004	"Viva England!"	49	—	—	—	—	—	—	—	—	—		Non-album singles
"—" denotes items that did not chart or were not released in that territory.

=== Members ===
- John Matthews – vocals
- Jon Jules – bass guitar
- Steve Mac – keyboards
