= Heart on My Sleeve (Gallagher & Lyle song) =

Pop song

Single by Gallagher & Lyle

from the album Breakaway
- B-side: "Storm in My Soul" (U.S.) "Northern Girl" (Intl.)
- Released: August 1976 (U.S.)
- Genre: Pop, Easy Listening
- Label: A&M
- Songwriters: Benny Gallagher, Graham Lyle

Gallagher & Lyle singles chronology
"Heart on My Sleeve" (1976)	"I Wanna Stay with You" (1976)

"Heart on My Sleeve"

Single by Bryan Ferry

from the album Let's Stick Together
- B-side: "Re-Make/Re-Model"
- Released: December 1976 (U.S.)
- Genre: Pop, Easy Listening
- Label: Atlantic
- Songwriters: Benny Gallagher, Graham Lyle

Bryan Ferry singles chronology
"The Price of Love" (1976)	"Heart on My Sleeve" (1976)	"This Is Tomorrow" (1977)

"Heart on My Sleeve" is a song written and originally recorded by Gallagher & Lyle in 1976. It was the second hit from their Breakaway album. The song reached the top ten in the UK, and was a US and UK hit for Bryan Ferry that same year from his Let's Stick Together LP.

== Chart history ==
=== Gallagher & Lyle ===
==== Weekly charts ====
Chart (1976)	Peak position
Australian (Kent Music Report)	58
Canada RPM Adult Contemporary	46
Canada RPM Top Singles	90
Ireland (IRMA)	2
New Zealand (RIANZ)	32
UK	6
US Billboard Hot 100	67
US Billboard Adult Contemporary	17

Chart (1991)	Peak position
UK	98

==== Year-end Charts ====
Chart (1976)	Rank
UK	71

=== Bryan Ferry ===
Chart (1976)	Peak position
Australia (Kent Music Report)	9
US Billboard Hot 100	86

== Other versions ==
- Ringo Starr covered "Heart on My Sleeve" on his 1978 album Bad Boy.
- Elsa Lunghini covered "Heart on My Sleeve" on her 1996 album Everyday.
