= Soul City Records =

Soul City Records may refer to:

- Soul City Records (British label), a British soul music label
- Soul City Records (American label), an American record label founded by Johnny Rivers best known for issuing recordings by The 5th Dimension
