= Break Away (Art Garfunkel song) =

1975 song written by Benny Gallagher and Graham Lyle

Single by Art Garfunkel

from the album Breakaway
- B-side: "Disney Girls"
- Released: December 1975
- Genre: Pop, adult contemporary
- Length: 3:35
- Label: Columbia
- Songwriter: Benny Gallagher and Graham Lyle
- Producer: Richard Perry

Art Garfunkel singles chronology
"My Little Town" (1975)	"Break Away" (1975)	"Crying in My Sleep" (1978)

"Breakaway"
- Side A of the 1976 Irish single

Single by Gallagher and Lyle

from the album Breakaway
- B-side: "Rock Writer"
- Released: August 20, 1976
- Recorded: 1975
- Genre: Soft rock
- Length: 4:05
- Label: A&M
- Songwriter: Benny Gallagher and Graham Lyle
- Producer: David Kershenbaum

Gallagher and Lyle singles chronology
"Heart on My Sleeve" (1976)	"Breakaway" (1976)	"Every Little Teardrop" (1977)
"Living on the Breadline" (1980)	"Breakaway (reissue)" (1983)	"You Put the Heart Back in the City" (1988)

"Break Away" (also known as "Breakaway") is a song written by Benny Gallagher and Graham Lyle and first recorded by Art Garfunkel for his 1975 album Breakaway. Gallagher and Lyle released their own version on their 1976 album, also titled Breakaway.

"Break Away", with backing vocals by David Crosby and Graham Nash, was the third single release from Garfunkel's album. The song peaked at No.39 on the Billboard Hot 100 and, in February 1976, went to No.1 on the Easy Listening chart for one week.

On the Canadian Adult Contemporary chart, "Break Away" reached No.2. It was blocked from reaching the No.1 position by former Simon & Garfunkel bandmate Paul Simon's song, "50 Ways to Leave Your Lover".

Gallagher and Lyle, the writers of the song, released their version of "Breakaway" in late 1976, the title track of their Breakaway LP. It charted in the British Isles, reaching No.35 in the UK and No.7 in Ireland.

== Charts ==
=== Weekly charts ===
Art Garfunkel

Chart (1975–1976)	Peak position
U.S. Billboard Hot 100	39
U.S. Billboard Easy Listening	1
U.S. Cashbox Top 100	38
Canada RPM Top Singles	28
Canada RPM Adult Contemporary	2

Gallagher & Lyle

Chart (1976)	Peak position
Ireland (IRMA)	7
UK Singles Chart	35

Chart (1983)	Peak position
Ireland (IRMA)	10

=== Year-end charts ===
Chart (1976)	Rank
Canada RPM Top Singles	191
U.S. Billboard Hot 100	218
U.S. Billboard Adult Contemporary	38

== See also ==
- List of number-one adult contemporary singles of 1976 (U.S.)
