= Stonebridge McGuinness =

British rock band

- Genres: Soft rock
- Years active: 1977–80
- Label: RCA
- Past members: Lou Stonebridge; Tom McGuinness

Stonebridge McGuinness was a rock duo which had a hit single in the UK singles charts in 1979.

== History ==
The duo was made up of Tom McGuinness and Lou Stonebridge, who had been members of the recently split McGuinness Flint. Their first single release, "Street Talkin'", under the name Stonebridge And McGuinness, on the Chrysalis Records sub-label Air was released in 1977, but was not a hit.

The following year, they signed to RCA, and released three singles, one of which - "Oo-Ee Baby" - reached no. 54 in the UK charts, and earned the duo an appearance on Top of the Pops on 12 July 1979.

An album, Corporate Madness, featuring the horn section from Graham Parker and the Rumour and Medicine Head's Peter Hope-Evans, was released in early 1980, but it missed the charts, and Tom McGuinness joined the Blues Band on a permanent basis and Lou Stonebridge went on to produce their first two albums.
