= Phil Swern =

English radio and record producer (1948–2024)

- Born: Anthony Philip Swern; 30 June 1948; Ealing, London, England
- Died: 31 August 2024 (aged 76)
- Occupations: Radio producer; music collector; record producer; songwriter

Anthony Philip Swern (30 June 1948 – 31 August 2024) was an English radio producer, record producer and collector.

== Career ==
Born in Ealing, London, Swern was a record producer and songwriter, and also wrote for television. He earned the nickname "The Collector" from working on Sounds of the 60s with Brian Matthew. He produced Pick of the Pops for BBC Radio 1 in the late 1980s and early 1990s and produced the show for BBC Radio 2 from 1997 to 2023. He also produced Sounds of the 60s for Radio 2 from 2007 until his death and formerly produced the Saturday night Bob Harris Show for the same station, also producing Harris's Radio 1 shows in the early 1990s. He also devised the questions for the PopMaster quiz on Radio 2's Ken Bruce Show until this role was assumed by Neil Myners and Simon Bray. Swern co-wrote the quiz show Pop the Question with Jeremy Beadle and co-created another quiz show, That's Showbusiness, with screenwriter Jeremy Pascall.

His first record production work was Horace Faith's recording of "Black Pearl" for Trojan Records in 1970. He went on to produce for many other musicians, including the Pearls, Polly Brown and R&J Stone, whose "We Do It", released in 1976, reached number 5 on the UK Singles Chart. In 1972, he formed the studio group Blue Haze with Johnny Arthey; their reggae cover version of "Smoke Gets In Your Eyes" reached number 27 on the U.S. Billboard Hot 100 and number 32 on the UK Singles Chart.

Swern had the world's only complete collection of every UK Top 40 chart hit since records began in 1952. His extensive work within the music industry led to him being awarded a BASCA Gold Badge Award in October 2010.

On 26 August 2024, Swern presented his Bank Holiday special Phil Swern’s Hidden Gems on Boom Radio. This was his last radio show, as he died on 31 August 2024 following a long illness with cancer, at the age of 76.
