= The Best of Simon and Garfunkel =

Greatest hits album by Simon & Garfunkel
- Released: November 16, 1999
- Recorded: 1965–1970, 1975
- Genre: Folk rock; folk-pop
- Length: 63:48
- Label: Columbia

Simon & Garfunkel chronology
Old Friends (1997)	The Best of Simon and Garfunkel (1999)	Two Can Dream Alone (2000)

Professional ratings
Review scores
Source	Rating
Allmusic link	5/5 stars

The Best of Simon and Garfunkel is the fifth compilation album of greatest hits by Simon & Garfunkel, released by Columbia Records in 1999, containing 20 tracks.

Shortly after its release, this album was revised and re-issued as an expanded 2-CD version called Tales from New York: The Very Best of Simon & Garfunkel.

== Track listing ==
All songs written and composed by Paul Simon, except where noted.

1. "The Sound of Silence" – 3:07
2. "Homeward Bound" – 2:29
3. "I Am a Rock" – 2:52
4. "The Dangling Conversation" – 2:38
5. "Scarborough Fair/Canticle" (Traditional, arranged by Simon, Art Garfunkel) – 3:10
6. "The 59th Street Bridge Song (Feelin' Groovy)" – 1:55
7. "A Hazy Shade of Winter" – 2:17
8. "At the Zoo" – 2:17
9. "Fakin' It (Mono version)" – 3:12
10. "Mrs. Robinson" – 4:04
11. "Old Friends/Bookends" – 3:57
12. "The Boxer" – 5:10
13. "Bridge over Troubled Water" – 4:54
14. "Cecilia" – 2:56
15. "The Only Living Boy in New York" – 3:59
16. "Song for the Asking" – 1:52
17. "El Condor Pasa (If I Could)" (Daniel Alomía Robles; English lyrics by Simon, arranged by Jorge Milchberg) – 3:08
18. "For Emily, Whenever I May Find Her" (Live) – 2:22
19. "America" – 3:37
20. "My Little Town" – 3:52

Producers: Tom Wilson, Bob Johnston, John Simon, Paul Simon, Arthur Garfunkel, Roy Halee & Phil Ramone

== Charts ==
Chart performance for The Best of Simon and Garfunkel
Chart (2002)	Peak position
Australian Albums (ARIA)	66
Belgian Albums (Ultratop Flanders)	71
Belgian Albums (Ultratop Wallonia)	85
Danish Albums (Hitlisten)	6
Dutch Albums (Album Top 100)	16
Greek Albums (IFPI)	10
Japanese Oricon Albums Chart	204
US Billboard 200	42

== Certifications and sales ==
Region	Certification	Certified units/sales
Japan (RIAJ)	2× Gold	200,000^{^}
United Kingdom (BPI)	Silver	60,000^{*}
United States (RIAA)	Platinum	1,000,000^{^}
^{*} Sales figures based on certification alone.^{^} Shipments figures based on certification alone.
