= Love on the Airwaves =

Studio album by Gallagher and Lyle
- Released: 1977
- Genre: Rock
- Label: A&M
- Producer: David Kershenbaum

Gallagher and Lyle chronology
Breakaway (1976)	Love on the Airwaves (1977)	Showdown (1978)

Professional ratings
Review scores
Source	Rating
Allmusic	2/5 stars

Love on the Airwaves is the sixth studio album by Scottish duo Gallagher and Lyle and was released in 1977.

The album contained the U.K. Top 40 single "Every Little Teardrop"

== Track listing ==
All songs are written and performed by Benny Gallagher and Graham Lyle, with additional horn arrangements by John Mumford and Jimmy Jewell and string arrangements by Brian Rogers.

Side 1

1. "Love on the Airwaves" - 4:20
2. "The Runaway" - 5:53
3. "Every Little Teardrop" - 3:52
4. "I Had to Fall in Love" - 5:09
5. "Street Boys" - 3:46

Side 2

1. "Never Give Up On Love" - 3:23
2. "Dude in the Dark" - 4:43
3. "Head Talk" - 3:49
4. "Call for the Captain" - 4:05
5. "It Only Hurts When I Laugh" - 2:57

Singer Jean Terrell released her first and only solo album a year after Love on the Airwaves under the name "I Had to Fall in Love". This title is taken from the Gallagher and Lyle song of the same name of which she covered on the album.

== Charts ==
=== Album Chart Position ===
The peak position that the album reached on album charts

Year	Country	Peak position
1977	U.K.	19
1977	Australia (Kent Music Report)	83

=== Every Little Teardrop ===
The lead single from the album, "Every Little Teardrop" charted in some countries:

Year	Country	Peak position
1977	Ireland	5
1977	U.K.	32
1977	Australia	67

== Personnel ==
- Benny Gallagher - vocals, piano, keyboards, bass guitar, percussion
- Graham Lyle - vocals, guitar
- Alan Hornall - bass
- Iain Rae - piano, organ, synthesizer
- Ray Duffy - drums
- Jimmy Jewell - saxophone
- John Mumford - trombone

Technical

- Geoff Emerick - engineer
