= My Little Town =

1975 single by Simon & Garfunkel

Single by Simon & Garfunkel

from the album Still Crazy After All These Years & Breakaway
- B-side: "Rag Doll" (Art Garfunkel); "You're Kind" (Paul Simon)
- Released: October 1975
- Genre: Rock
- Length: 3:51
- Label: Columbia
- Songwriter: Paul Simon
- Producers: Paul Simon; Art Garfunkel; Phil Ramone

Simon & Garfunkel singles chronology
"America" (1972)	"My Little Town" (1975)	"Wake Up Little Susie" (1982)

"My Little Town" is a 1975 song by the American duo Simon & Garfunkel. It was written by Paul Simon, who produced the track along with Art Garfunkel and Phil Ramone. The song was included on the 1975 solo releases from both Simon (Still Crazy After All These Years) and Garfunkel (Breakaway). It would not appear on any of the duo's albums until the 1997 anthology box set Old Friends and the 1999 compilation album The Best of Simon and Garfunkel. It was the first single release credited to the duo since the 1972 release of "America", released in conjunction with Simon and Garfunkel's Greatest Hits.

== History ==
In 1970 Simon and Garfunkel decided to part ways and record their own solo material. In June 1972 they were asked to sing at a political benefit concert for United States presidential candidate George McGovern at Madison Square Garden, New York City. During this hiatus, Garfunkel worked as a teacher in Connecticut, a draftsman in New York and a math tutor in Los Angeles before working on a solo album, coincidentally at the same time as Simon.

In early 1975, Simon decided to prepare material for a new solo album. The music was a bit more personal, but one song was written with Garfunkel in mind. Simon was quoted as saying: "It originally was a song I was writing for Artie. I was gonna write a song for his new album, and I told him it would be a nasty song, because he was singing too many sweet songs. It seemed like a good concept for him." After Simon played the song for Garfunkel, the two decided to collaborate on this track in the studio.

Simon has stated that "My Little Town" is not autobiographical; he says it is about "someone who hates the town he grew up in. Somebody happy to get out." Garfunkel explained that the song was about his own childhood, how he "grew up in an area where a career in music was not seen as either desirable or exciting." Garfunkel's parents insisted he gain some qualification aside from his singing (he earned a bachelor's degree in art history in 1965, and a master's degree in mathematics in 1967).

In an interview with Bill Flanagan for the book "Written In My Soul: Conversations With Great Songwriters," Simon says he was "actually picturing a town. I was thinking about Gloucester, Massachusetts. A friend of mine comes from Gloucester and he used to talk about what it was like to grow up there...That song was entirely an act of imagination...There's no element of me in there at all."

The song references the lines of Ted Hughes' poem Crow (quoted in liner notes to Paul Simon's release of the song: "To hatch a crow, a black rainbow/Bent in emptiness/over emptiness/But flying"), the song relates the town's sameness suggesting even the colors of the rainbow there are black.

The song begins with a piano solo by Barry Beckett and drums from Roger Hawkins. Paul Simon provides acoustic guitar, Pete Carr plays electric guitar; bass is provided by David Hood and percussion by Ralph MacDonald. Horns and backing vocals are present in the last verse.

Billboard described the song as "a good, nostalgic Americana style song that builds throughout". Cash Box said it has "catchy piano beneath historic harmony growing into a brass hook ending" and that "you’ll remember the melody by the third time you hear it." Record World called it a "richly hued ballad with their distinctive harmonies melting over a rhythmic base supplied by the Muscle Shoals Swampers."

On October 18, 1975, Simon hosted the second episode of the premiere season of the NBC comedy sketch program Saturday Night Live. During the musical numbers, Garfunkel performed with him, and together they sang three songs: "The Boxer"; "Scarborough Fair", and their new collaboration, "My Little Town".

== Charts ==
The buzz surrounding the surprise reunion of the two singers helped to generate anticipation for each of their solo albums, which were released within a few weeks of the performance on Saturday Night Live. Credited on both albums as being performed by 'Simon & Garfunkel', "My Little Town" became the duo's eighth top-ten hit on the Billboard Hot 100 chart in late 1975, peaking at number nine. It spent two weeks atop the Billboard adult contemporary chart, and was their second number one on this survey as a duo. Both singers have hit number one on the adult contemporary chart as solo performers as well, Garfunkel four times and Simon twice.

== Chart performance ==
=== Weekly charts ===
Chart (1975–76)	Peak position
Australian KMR	46
Canada RPM Top Singles	9
Canada RPM Adult Contemporary	2
Netherlands	17
New Zealand Singles Chart	24
Spanish Singles Chart	8
US Billboard Hot 100	9
US Billboard Adult Contemporary	1
US Cash Box Top 100	7

=== Year-end charts ===
Chart (1975)	Rank
Canada RPM Top Singles	109
U.S. (Joel Whitburn's Pop Annual)	100
U.S. Billboard Easy Listening	8

== Personnel ==
- Paul Simon – vocals, acoustic guitar
- Art Garfunkel – vocals
- Barry Beckett – piano
- Pete Carr – electric guitar
- David Hood – bass guitar
- Roger Hawkins – drums
- Ralph MacDonald – shaker, bongo drums, cowbell, temple blocks, triangle
- Dave Matthews – horn arrangement

== Legacy ==
A small section of the horn part at the end of "My Little Town" was sampled by AJR for their 2021 song "Way Less Sad". The band said that "My Little Town" was one of their favorite songs growing up, and that the ending was their favorite part.

== See also ==
- List of number-one adult contemporary singles of 1975 (U.S.)
