= R&J Stone =

Pop music duo

- Origin: United Kingdom
- Genres: Pop
- Years active: 1970s
- Labels: RCA Records
- Past members: Russell Stone; Joanne Stone

R&J Stone were the British/American husband and wife musical duo of Russell Oliver Stone and Joanne Stone. The pair were originally members of James Last's British Choir for a number of years. They had a hit single in the mid 1970s with their self penned song "We Do It". The track was produced by Phil Swern. Some time after their hit, Russell Stone decided that he did not want to remain as a singer, and preferred to concentrate on producing and writing for his wife. Their second album did not do well and a third album, although recorded, was never released.

Joanne Stone died of a brain tumour in 1979.

Russell Stone later went to Munich to work with the Icelander Thor Baldursson. Stone, a recovered alcoholic, has released three solo albums – Love Aspects (2013), Groove Aspects (2014) and Devotional Aspects (2016) – after spending years out of the music industry. He died on 21 August 2024.

== Discography ==
=== Albums ===
- We Do It - RCA RS 1052 - 1976 (AUS number 12)
- R&J - RCA PL 25069 - 1977
- Very Best of R&J Stone - Lynx Music UK LYX004CD - 2012

=== Singles ===
- "We Do It" / "We Love Each Other" - RCA 2616 - 1976 (UK number 5)(AUS number 3)
- "One Chance" / "I Just Can't Get It Right" - RCA 2660 - 1976
- "There's No Other Way" / "I Just Can't Get It Right" - RCA 2681 - 1976
- "Thrown It All Away" / "Home Is Where the Heart Is" - RCA 2746 - 1976
- "It Just Goes to Show" - RCA PB 5018 - 1977
