= We Do It =

Single by R&J Stone

from the album We Do It
- B-side: "We Love Each Other"
- Released: 1976
- Genre: Soul, pop
- Label: RCA 2616
- Songwriter: Russell Stone
- Producer: Phil Swern

R&J Stone singles chronology
"We Do It" (1976)	"One Chance" (1976)

"We Do It" is a song written by Russell Stone, who was the male half of the husband and wife duo R&J Stone. It was produced by Phil Swern, and became a hit in 1976, peaking at No. 5 on the UK Singles Chart. It was also a top 5 hit in Australia.

It was re-released in 1987 on Soul City Records.

Carol Douglas, who had a hit with "Doctors Orders" in 1974, also recorded her version of "We Do It" in 1977.

== Releases ==
- "We Do It" / "We Love Each Other" - RCA Records 2616 (1976, UK)
- R & J Stone - "We Do It" (12" Mix) / Cee Jay PeaeS - "We've Gone and Done It Now", R&J Stone - "We Do It" (7" Mix) - Soul City Records SITY T3 (1987, UK)
- R&J Stone - "We Do It" / Kandidate - "I Don't Wanna Lose You" - Old Gold OG 9684

== Charts ==
=== Weekly charts ===
Chart (1975–1976)	Peak position
Australia (Kent Music Report)	3
Irish Singles Chart (IRMA)	6
UK Singles Chart (OCC)	5

=== Year-end charts ===
Chart (1976)	Peak position
Australia (Kent Music Report)	12
