= Gallagher and Lyle =

Scottish musical duo

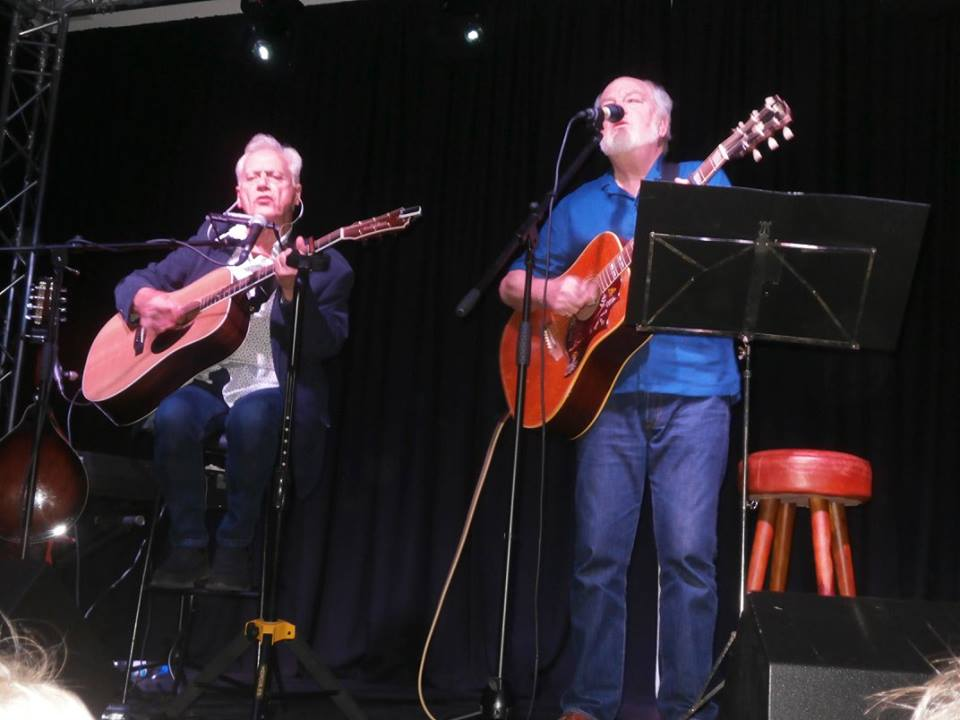
- Gallagher & Lyle performing at The Albany Theatre in Greenock in 2017

Background information
- Origin: Largs, Ayrshire, Scotland
- Genres: Pop rock, folk rock, country rock, blues rock, soft rock, blue-eyed soul, Celtic rock
- Years active: 1972–1980, 2010–2018
- Labels: A&M, Mercury
- Past members: Benny Gallagher; Graham Lyle

Gallagher and Lyle were a Scottish musical duo, comprising singer-songwriters Benny Gallagher and Graham Lyle. Their style consisted mainly of pop, soft and folk rock oriented songs.

Their first recognition came in 1968, when they were signed by the Beatles to write for Apple Records' artists. They were founding members of the band McGuinness Flint and wrote the 1970 UK chart hit "When I'm Dead and Gone".

In 1972, they formed the duo Gallagher and Lyle, whose fifth album Breakaway (1976) reached #6 in the UK, the title track had been a hit in 1975 for Art Garfunkel. It included the hit songs "Heart on My Sleeve" and "I Wanna Stay with You". Don Williams took their song "Stay Young" to No. 1 on the US Country charts.

The duo split in 1980, but re-formed in 2010 and worked together on an intermittent basis, mainly as a live act, until 2018.

Gallagher and Lyle have worked, jointly and individually, on records with, among others, Paul McCartney, Eric Clapton, Pete Townshend, Ronnie Lane, Ronnie Wood, Joan Armatrading, Ralph McTell, Sandy Denny, Fairport Convention and Jim Diamond. Artists who have released Gallagher and Lyle songs include Bryan Ferry, Ringo Starr, Elkie Brooks, Fairport Convention, Art Garfunkel and Joe Brown.

== Career ==
They joined forces in 1959, initially as members of a local Largs-based band, The Bluefrets. They began writing original material for the band, while Gallagher also co-wrote "Mr Heartbreak's Here Instead" for Dean Ford and the Gaylords (later to become Marmalade). The duo issued a one-off single, "Trees" b/w "In The Crowd" under the name 'Gallagher-Lyle' on UK Polydor 56093 in 1967. They also backed singer James Galt, a friend of theirs from Largs, on two singles for Pye Records that are now highly prized by northern soul collectors: "Comes The Dawn"/"My Own Way" and "With My Baby"/"A Most Unusual Feeling". The first of these was composed by Gallagher, Lyle and Galt, while the second was written by, firstly, Lyle alone and secondly by Gallagher and Lyle.

They were then signed by Apple Records where they wrote for one of the label's most successful artists aside from The Beatles and Beatles-related acts, Mary Hopkin. Songs for Hopkin included "Sparrow", "The Fields of St. Etienne", "International", "Heritage" and "Jefferson". In 1970 Gallagher and Lyle were amongst the founders of McGuinness Flint, writing nine of the 11 songs on the group's debut album, including the UK Singles Chart Top 5 hits "When I'm Dead and Gone" and "Malt and Barley Blues", both of which were produced by Glyn Johns. They recorded a second album with McGuinness Flint, Happy Birthday Ruthy Baby, again writing most of the songs, before leaving to form the duo Gallagher and Lyle in 1972.

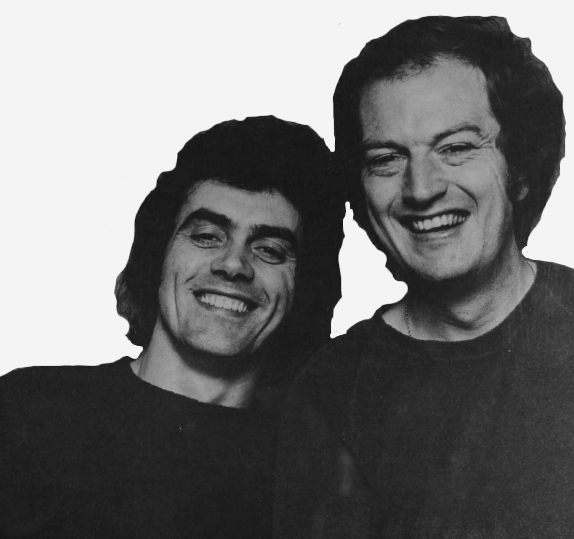
Gallagher and Lyle in 1977

Their first album as a duo, Benny Gallagher and Graham Lyle, was produced by Glyn Johns and released on Capitol; they then signed to A&M Records. They were to record three more albums with Johns, Willie and the Lapdog, Seeds and The Last Cowboy. Their fifth album Breakaway utilised US producer David Kershenbaum and it was with this release, in 1976, that they charted again, with the hits "Heart on My Sleeve" and "I Wanna Stay With You", both of which reached Number 6 in the UK Singles Chart and also charted in the US.

Their mellow sound was only briefly in vogue and elusive further success (another minor hit in the UK was "Every Little Teardrop") prompted their split in 1980, by which time three more albums had been issued: Love On The Airwaves (which went silver in the UK), Showdown and Lonesome No More. The last of these was issued on Mercury; a further album recorded for that label, Living On The Breadline, has never been released. The duo's original version of "A Heart In New York", which was to have been included on that set, appeared on 1991's compilation album Heart On My Sleeve – The Very Best of Gallagher and Lyle.

Gallagher and Lyle sang and performed as members of Ronnie Lane and The Slim Chance Band on the hit single "How Come" and the ensuing album Anymore for Anymore, and they have worked, jointly and individually, on records with Mary Hopkin, Paul McCartney, Eric Clapton, Pete Townshend, Ronnie Lane, Ronnie Wood, Elkie Brooks, Joe Egan, Andy Fairweather Low, Gary Brooker, Dennis Coulson, Arthur "Big Boy" Crudup, Champion Jack Dupree, Joan Armatrading, Ralph McTell, Sandy Denny, Fairport Convention and Jim Diamond.

Other artists who have recorded Gallagher and Lyle songs include: Bryan Ferry, Colin Blunstone, Donavon Frankenreiter, Elkie Brooks, Fairport Convention, Fury in the Slaughterhouse, Joe Brown, Judith Durham, Little Anthony and the Imperials, Phil Everly, Ricky Nelson, Ringo Starr, Rita Coolidge, Status Quo, The Fureys, Lemon Jelly, and Jim Capaldi.

== Reunion ==
The seeds for a reunion were sown in 2007 when both Gallagher and Lyle, as session musicians, appeared on an album by Canadian singer-songwriter Chris Tassone; this was recorded at London's Abbey Road Studios. In April 2009, the two Scots attended the opening of the Largs Heritage Centre. The following year, the duo re-formed.

In October 2010 the pair staged two charity concerts in Largs in aid of Haylie House, a residential care home in the town. This was followed in June 2011 by 'The Big Gig', an all-star charity concert at Glasgow's Barrowland nightclub, in which they performed alongside Midge Ure, Jim Diamond and Marti Pellow. In September of that year, the duo appeared at the outdoor MOARE Festival in Faversham, Kent, which was headlined by former Average White Band stalwart Hamish Stuart.

2012 saw Gallagher and Lyle undertake their first tour since 1979, consisting of 9 dates at 8 Scottish venues. Their two dates at The Green Hotel in Kinross, a large golf resort, earned them the Mundell Music Award for Best UK Performance of the year, to add to their Tartan Clef Award for Lifetime Achievement, which they had received in November 2010.

The soundtrack to the 2012 documentary film "We Went To War", directed by Michael Grigsby and relating the stories of three Vietnam War veterans, features the song "I Was A Soldier", which was written and performed by Gallagher and Lyle.

In March 2016, Gallagher and Lyle performed together at the Belfast Nashville Songwriters' Festival. In November 2016, the duo returned to The Green Hotel in Kinross for four concerts.

The summer of 2017 saw the duo perform as part of the 'Byre at The Botanics' season in St Andrews, and also at the Belladrum Festival in Inverness and the Albany Theatre in Greenock.

In March 2018, the duo returned to Belfast to perform once more at the Belfast Nashville Songwriters' Festival. On 13 March 2018, it was announced on Facebook that Benny Gallagher's and the duo's fan pages were to be closed down; the duo has been inactive since then.

== Stage musical ==
"Caledonia USA", a musical based on the songs of Gallagher and Lyle, was staged in Largs in April 2016. Originally titled "When I'm Dead and Gone", it was subsequently retitled after a new song written specially for the show by Gallagher and Lyle.

== References in popular culture ==
"When I'm Dead and Gone" was featured on the soundtrack of the 1999 British comedy-drama film East is East.

British chick-lit author Lisa Jewell's 2010 novel After The Party makes reference to "I Wanna Stay With You".

The late British broadcaster Kenny Everett staged a visual interpretation of "Heart on My Sleeve" on his BBC TV show in the early 1980s.

The Variety Club of Great Britain has used "Heart on My Sleeve" to promote its Gold Heart Appeal.

British Electronic music duo Lemon Jelly sampled "I Wanna Stay With You" on the track "'75 aka Stay With You", which is on their third studio album '64-'95.

== Duo discography ==
=== Studio albums ===
Date	Title	UK	AUS
1972	Gallagher and Lyle^{A}	-	-
1973	Willie and the Lapdog	-	-
1973	Seeds	-	-
1974	The Last Cowboy	-	-
1976	Breakaway	6	67
1977	Love on the Airwaves	19	83
1978	Showdown	-	-
1979	Lonesome No More	-	-

=== Compilation albums ===
Date	Title
1980	The Best of Gallagher and Lyle: 20 Beautiful Songs
1991	The Very Best of Gallagher & Lyle^{B}
1995	The Best of Gallagher & Lyle

=== Live albums ===
Date	Title
1999	Live in Concert^{C}
2004	The River Sessions^{D}

=== Charted singles ===
Date	Title	AUS	CAN 100	CAN AC	IRE	NZ	UK	US	US AC
1976	"Heart on My Sleeve"	58	60	28	2	32	6	67	17
1976	"I Wanna Stay with You"	48	90	46	5	-	6	49	27
1977	"Breakaway"	-	-	-	7	-	35	-	-
1977	"Every Little Teardrop"	67	-	-	5	-	32	106	46
1983	"Breakaway" (reissue)	-	-	-	10	-	-	-	-
1991	"Heart on My Sleeve" (reissue)	-	-	-	-	-	98	-	-

A: Reissued in 1973 on A&M; titled Benny Gallagher and Graham Lyle in some countries.
B: Includes previously unreleased "A Heart in New York", which was recorded for Mercury.
C: Recorded by the BBC Radio.
D: Recorded for Radio Clyde in 1974.

NOTE: All the duo's original studio albums for A&M and Mercury, excluding the eponymous debut, were reissued on CD in 2004 by River Records. (The River reissues suffered from less than ideal sound quality with reduced highs. Although these were legal reissues, it is not known if they had access to the original master tapes or not.) Universal Music Japan reissued the duo's first four albums as limited edition CDs (with excellent sound), including the debut, with bonus tracks in 2016, thus making the rare A&M B-sides "Joie De Vivre" and "All I Wanna Do" available on CD along with both sides of the duo's Polydor single, "Trees" and "In The Crowd". Tracks still to be released on CD are the B-sides "Golden Boy", "Sunny Side Up" and "Take the Money and Run", as well as 1980's non-album A-side "Living On The Breadline".

== Miscellaneous discography ==
=== With McGuinness Flint ===
- McGuinness Flint (1970, Capitol)
- Happy Birthday, Ruthy Baby (1971, Capitol)
- McGuinness Flint: The Capitol Years (compilation album) (1996, Capitol; includes some non-album tracks)
- McGuinness Flint in Session at the BBC (2009, BBC; includes some tracks by the post-Gallagher and Lyle line-up)

=== With Ronnie Lane's Slim Chance ===
- Anymore For Anymore (1974, GM; reissued in 1998 on See For Miles with the additions of non-album tracks "How Come" and "Done This One Before")

Compilations featuring rare early tracks:

- Footsteps to Fame, Vol.2 (1991, Repertoire)
- Soul For Sale (1998, Sequel)
- Ripples, Volume 8 (2002, Sanctuary)
- An Apple A Day (2006, RPM)
- Fairytales Can Come True (2007, Psychic Circle)
- Treacle Toffee World (2008, RPM)

=== Graham Lyle ===
- Something Beautiful Remains (2003, Hypertension)

NOTE: Lyle's solo single "Marley"/"Down The Subway" (1983, Red Bus) and the Lyle-Livsey Band's one-off single "Taking Off"/"Taking Off (Instrumental)" (1984, Dolphin; Ireland only) have never appeared on any CD.

=== Lyle McGuinness Band ===
- Acting On Impulse (1983, Cool King/Polydor)
- Elise, Elise (1997, Diamond Recordings; reissue of Acting On Impulse with additional non-album tracks, plus previously unreleased Gallagher/Lyle composition "Fighting For The Cause")
