= Stay Young (Gallagher & Lyle song) =

Gallagher & Lyle song

Single by Don Williams

from the album Yellow Moon
- B-side: "Pressure Makes Diamonds"
- Released: November 1983
- Genre: Country
- Length: 3:06
- Label: MCA
- Songwriters: Benny Gallagher; Graham Lyle
- Producers: Don Williams; Garth Fundis

Don Williams singles chronology
"Nobody but You" (1983)	"Stay Young" (1983)	"That's the Thing About Love" (1984)

"Stay Young is a song written by Benny Gallagher and Graham Lyle, and originally recorded on their 1976 album Breakaway. In the United States, the song was covered by American country music artist Don Williams. It was released in November 1983 as the third single from his album Yellow Moon. It was his fifteenth number one country hit. The single went to number one for one week and spent a total of twelve weeks on the country chart.

== Charts ==
=== Weekly charts ===
Chart (1983–1984)	Peak position
US Hot Country Songs (Billboard)	1
Canadian RPM Country Tracks	3

=== Year-end charts ===
Chart (1984)	Position
US Hot Country Songs (Billboard)	45
