= Graham Lyle =

Scottish musician and producer (born 1944)

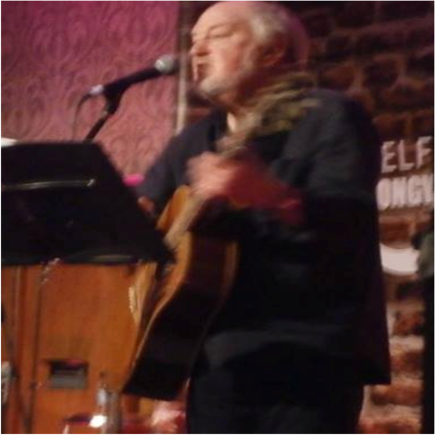
- Lyle performing at the Belfast Nashville Songwriters' Festival in March 2016

Background information
- Born: Graham Hamilton Lyle; 11 March 1944 (age 82); Bellshill, Lanarkshire, Scotland
- Origin: Largs, Ayrshire, Scotland
- Genres: Pop, folk rock, country rock, adult contemporary, soft rock, soul
- Instruments: Vocals, guitar, mandolin, banjo, bass guitar, violin, drums, harmonica
- Years active: 1965–present
- Labels: Capitol, A&M, Mercury, Hypertension

Graham Hamilton Lyle (born 11 March 1944, in Bellshill, Lanarkshire, Scotland) is a Scottish singer-songwriter, guitarist and producer.

Between 1970 and 1997, he co-wrote 18 British Top 40 hits, 9 Billboard Hot 100 entries, 4 US Country No.1s and 1 US Adult Contemporary No.1, as well as 3 Australian chart-toppers. His songwriting collaborators have included Terry Britten, Albert Hammond, Troy Seals, Jim Diamond and his long-time performing partner, Benny Gallagher.

His most famous composition is Tina Turner's 1984 US chart-topper and international smash, "What's Love Got to Do with It?", which reached No.1 in the US, Canada and Australia and won him the Song of the Year Grammy. He is also well known in Britain, Continental Europe and the Commonwealth as a member of Gallagher and Lyle, McGuinness Flint and Ronnie Lane's band Slim Chance.

== With Benny Gallagher (1965–1980) ==
Lyle and Benny Gallagher initially teamed up in 1959 as members of a local Largs-based band, The Bluefrets, and teamed up again in a band based in Saltcoats called the Tulsans with lead singer James (Drew) Galt, Dennis Donald (keyboards), Eric Brown on guitar, Benny Gallagher (bass) and Graham Lyle (drums). The Tulsans released two singles in 1965 under the name James Galt for Pye that are now prized by northern soul collectors: "Comes The Dawn" and "With My Baby". Benny and Graham later moved to London in the mid 60s.

A rare one-off single, "Trees", was issued on UK Polydor 56093 in 1967, under the name Gallagher-Lyle.

In 1968, Gallagher and Lyle were signed by Apple Records, where they wrote for musicians such as Mary Hopkin ("Sparrow", "The Fields of St. Etienne", "International", "Heritage", and "Jefferson").

In 1970, the two Scots became original members of the British band McGuinness Flint, writing nine of the 11 songs on the group's eponymous debut album, including the British hit singles "When I'm Dead and Gone" and "Malt and Barley Blues", which reached No.2 and No.5 respectively in Britain. The pair recorded a second album, Happy Birthday Ruthy Baby, with McGuinness Flint—again writing most of the songs—before leaving to form the duo Gallagher and Lyle in 1972.

As a duo, Gallagher and Lyle recorded a total of eight albums: Benny Gallagher and Graham Lyle, Willie and the Lapdog, Seeds, The Last Cowboy, Breakaway, Love on the Airwaves, Showdown and Lonesome No More. All these were issued on A&M except for the last, which was released on Mercury. The most successful of these was 1976's gold-selling Breakaway, which was produced by David Kershenbaum and yielded the British Top 10 hits "I Wanna Stay With You" and "Heart on My Sleeve", both of which also charted in the US. "Heart on My Sleeve" was subsequently covered by Bryan Ferry, Judith Durham and Ringo Starr.

Two other songs from this album were successful in the US: Art Garfunkel's cover of "Breakaway", topped the Adult Contemporary chart, and Don Williams took "Stay Young" to No. 1 on the Country record chart, which saw the song receive in excess of one million airplays on American radio. The duo also penned and performed "A Heart in New York", which was later performed by both Simon & Garfunkel and Garth Brooks in their concerts in Central Park, New York City, to audiences of 500,000 and 750,000, respectively. The pair's original recording of "A Heart in New York" eventually appeared on 1991's compilation album Heart on My Sleeve – The Very Best of Gallagher and Lyle.

As session musicians, Gallagher and Lyle also backed numerous big names on disc, including Eric Clapton, Andy Fairweather Low, Gary Brooker and Fairport Convention. The pair also had a stint in former Faces member Ronnie Lane's folk rock band Slim Chance during 1973/74. Gallagher and Lyle split in 1980.

== Post-Gallagher and Lyle (1981–2009) ==
In 1981, Graham Lyle formed his own publishing company, Goodsingle Publishing (later to become goodsingle.com), chiefly to administer his own copyrights, and began writing for other artists. His earliest post-Gallagher & Lyle compositions included the singles "Our Love" for Elkie Brooks and "Listen to the Night" for Climax Blues Band. Graham's songs were subsequently recorded by some of the biggest names in music including Michael Jackson and Stevie Wonder, Ray Charles, Diana Ross, Etta James, Patti LaBelle, Anita Baker, Joe Cocker, Wyclef Jean, Fat Joe, Rod Stewart, Tom Jones, The Neville Brothers, Hall & Oates, Kenny Rogers, Crystal Gayle, Jim Diamond, The Judds, Wet Wet Wet, Paul Young, Bucks Fizz, Eros Ramazzotti, and Warren G, but it is for his work with Tina Turner that Lyle is best known.

Lyle and Terry Britten won the Song of the Year Grammy for "What's Love Got to Do with It?" and an Ivor Novello award for another of Tina Turner's major international hits, "We Don't Need Another Hero", which was recorded for the soundtrack of Mad Max Beyond Thunderdome. Tina would prove to be Lyle's biggest money-spinning act; he would co-write another 3 US Hot 100 entries and 6 more British Top 40 hits for her, including 1989's British No.8 hit "I Don't Wanna Lose You" in collaboration with Albert Hammond.

Another high earner for the Lyle-Britten partnership was "Just Good Friends", which was recorded by Michael Jackson on his multi-million selling album "Bad" in 1987. Jim Diamond scored a British and Australian No.1 in 1984 with "I Should Have Known Better", which he wrote with Lyle. Wet Wet Wet's "If I Never See You Again", co-written by Lyle and Britten, reached No.3 in the UK in 1997.

Between 1986 and 1988, Lyle co-authored 3 US Country chart-toppers: "Maybe Your Baby's Got the Blues" for The Judds, "Straight to the Heart" for Crystal Gayle, and "Joe Knows How to Live" for Eddy Raven.

Lyle's recordings after 1980 were rare, but included an album with Tom McGuinness, credited to the Lyle McGuinness Band: Acting on Impulse (1983), as well as a solo portfolio album, Something Beautiful Remains (2003). A solo single, "Marley", was issued on Red Bus in the UK in 1983, while "Taking Off" – a TV advertising jingle, co-written with prolific session keyboardist Billy Livsey and credited to the Lyle-Livsey Band – was released on the Dolphin label in 1984, but only in Éire, where it became a Top 20 hit.

In 1997, Lyle co-wrote and produced 2 British Top 20 hits for Conner Reeves: "My Father's Son" (No.12) and "Earthbound" (No.14). The former song was covered by Joe Cocker.

More recently, Lyle performed his composition "One Woman" at the United Nations in New York (www.un.org/webcast/) on 24 February 2011 to launch their "U.N.Woman" project.

== Reunion with Benny Gallagher (2009–2018) ==
The seeds for a reunion with Benny Gallagher were sown in 2007 when he and Lyle, as session musicians, appeared on an album by Canadian singer-songwriter Chris Tassone; this was recorded at London's Abbey Road studios. In April 2009, soon after Lyle's official retirement, the two Scots attended the opening of the Largs Heritage Centre. The following year, the duo re-formed.

In October 2010, the pair staged two charity concerts in Largs in aid of Haylie House, a residential care home in the town. The following month, they received the Tartan Clef for Lifetime Achievement at a ceremony in Glasgow.

In June 2011 they performed alongside Midge Ure, Jim Diamond and Marti Pellow as part of 'The Big Gig', an all-star charity concert at Glasgow's Barrowland nightclub. In September of that year, the duo appeared at the outdoor MOARE Festival in Faversham, Kent, which was headlined by former Average White Band stalwart Hamish Stuart.

2012 saw Gallagher and Lyle undertake their first tour since 1979, consisting of 9 dates at 8 Scottish venues. Their two dates at The Green Hotel in Kinross, a large golf resort, earned them the Mundell Music Award for Best UK Performance of the year.

In March 2016, Gallagher and Lyle performed together at the Belfast Nashville Songwriters' Festival. In November 2016, the duo returned to The Green Hotel in Kinross for four concerts.

The summer of 2017 saw the duo perform as part of the 'Byre at The Botanics' season in St Andrews, and also at the Belladrum Festival in Inverness and the Albany Theatre in Greenock.

In March 2018, the duo returned to Belfast to perform once more at the Belfast Nashville Songwriters' Festival. The duo have been inactive since then, following the announcement on Facebook on 13 March 2018 that Benny Gallagher's and the duo's fan pages were to be closed down.

== Stage musical ==
Caledonia USA, a musical based on the songs of Gallagher and Lyle, was staged in Largs in April 2016. Originally titled "When I'm Dead and Gone", it was subsequently retitled after a new song written specially for the show by Gallagher and Lyle.

== Hit singles as a songwriter ==
McGuinness Flint

- "When I'm Dead and Gone": UK#2, US#47 (1970)
- "Malt and Barley Blues": UK#5 (1971)

Gallagher and Lyle

- "I Wanna Stay With You" by Gallagher and Lyle: UK#6, US#49 (1976)
- "Heart on My Sleeve": UK#6, US#67; Bryan Ferry's version reached US#86 (1976)
- "Breakaway": UK#35; Art Garfunkel's version reached US#39 and US AC#1 (1976)
- "Every Little Teardrop": UK#32 (1977)

Jim Diamond

- "I Should Have Known Better": UK#1, AUS#1 (1984)

Tina Turner

- "What's Love Got to Do with It?": US#1, UK#3, AUS#1 (1984)
- "We Don't Need Another Hero": UK#3, US#2, AUS#1 (1985)
- "Typical Male": US#2, UK#33 (1986)
- "Two People": US#30, UK#43 (1986)
- "What You Get Is What You See": US#13, UK#30 (1987)
- "I Don't Wanna Lose You": UK#8 (1989)
- "Way of the World": UK#13 (1991)
- "I Want You Near Me": UK#22 (1992)
- "Something Beautiful Remains": UK#27 (1996)

Wet Wet Wet

- "If I Never See You Again": UK#3 (1997)

Conner Reeves

- "My Father's Son": UK#12 (1997)
- "Earthbound": UK#14 (1997)

US Country No.1s

- "Stay Young" by Don Williams: US Hot Country#1 (1983)
- "Straight to the Heart" by Crystal Gayle: US Hot Country#1 (1986)
- "Maybe Your Baby's Got the Blues" by The Judds: US Hot Country#1 (1987)
- "Joe Knows How to Live" by Eddy Raven: US Hot Country#1 (1988)

== Discography ==
See Gallagher and Lyle.
