= Benny Gallagher =

Scottish singer-songwriter (born 1945)

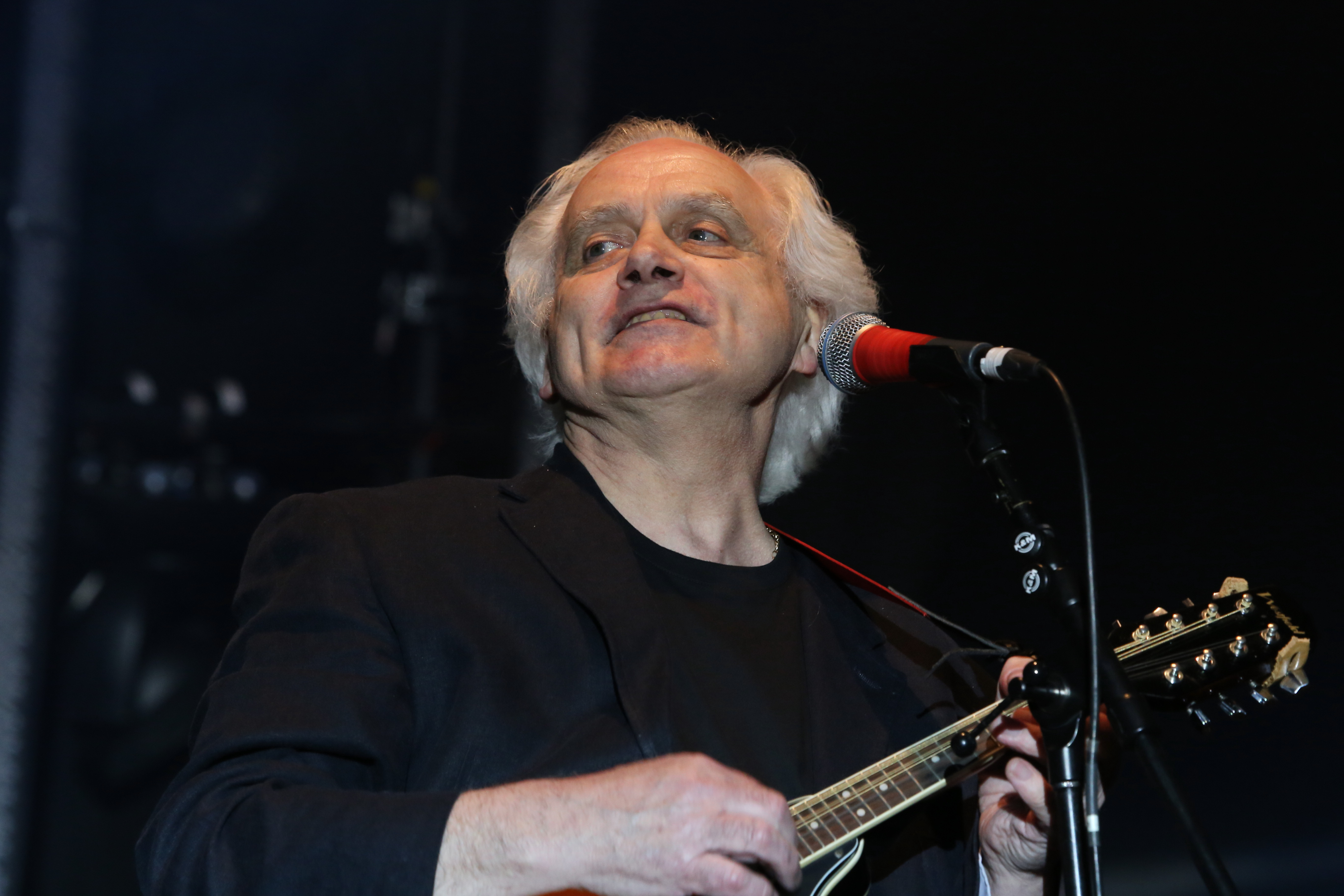
- Gallagher with SAS Band in 2013

Background information
- Born: Bernard Joseph Gallagher; 10 June 1945 (age 81); Largs, Ayrshire, Scotland
- Genres: Pop, folk rock, country rock
- Instruments: Vocals, guitar, keyboards, bass guitar, piano accordion, mandolin, ocarina, harmonica
- Labels: A&M, Mercury, OnSong

Bernard Joseph "Benny" Gallagher (born 10 June 1945) is a Scottish singer-songwriter and multi-instrumentalist, most famous as half of the popular duo Gallagher and Lyle.

== Career ==
The son of Irish parents, Gallagher attended St Michael's Academy, Kilwinning, and then worked as a marine electrician in the shipyards of Glasgow. During this time, he also played bass guitar in local semi-professional beat group The Bluefrets, which featured Graham Lyle on lead guitar.

Gallagher's first published song was "Mr Heartbreak's Here Instead", which he co-wrote with Andrew Galt. This was recorded as a single for EMI-Columbia in 1964 by Dean Ford and the Gaylords, the bulk of which group later became chart-topping outfit Marmalade.

Galt then made two singles for Pye, "Comes The Dawn" and "With My Baby", under the name James Galt; both were co-written and featured backing vocals by Gallagher and Graham Lyle.

In 1966, Gallagher and Lyle – who by now had forged a songwriting partnership – moved to London in search of a publishing deal. Both continued to hold down day jobs, Gallagher as an electrician and Lyle as a shipping clerk, while waiting for their big break. After an abortive contract with Polydor, which yielded one unsuccessful single, the pair joined Apple Corps as staff songwriters and wrote several songs for Mary Hopkin.

Gallagher and Lyle first hit the chart as performers in late 1970 as the leading lights of McGuinness Flint, a blues-rock band formed by ex-Manfred Mann guitarist Tom McGuinness. This band made two well-received albums and scored two Top 5 singles in Britain with "When I'm Dead and Gone" and "Malt and Barley Blues", before Gallagher and Lyle left to work as a duo. Gallagher was credited as Bernard Gallagher on sheet music copies of early songs such as these, but later shortened his forename to avoid confusion with golfer Bernard Gallacher.

Between 1972 and 1975, Gallagher and Lyle made four albums for A&M: Gallagher and Lyle, Willie and the Lap Dog, Seeds and The Last Cowboy, all of which were produced by Glyn Johns, and met with favourable reviews. Gallagher and Lyle also enjoyed a brief stint as members of Ronnie Lane's band Slim Chance, recording the album Anymore For Anymore with him and backing him on several TV appearances, including a slot on Top of the Pops to promote his hit single "How Come".

It was not until 1976, however, that the duo hit the big time after teaming up with US producer David Kershenbaum on their gold-selling fifth album Breakaway. This set spawned two British Top 10 singles, "I Wanna Stay With You" and "Heart on My Sleeve", both of which also charted in the US; the latter song was covered successfully by Bryan Ferry. The album included "Stay Young", which Don Williams took to No. 1 on the US C&W chart, while Art Garfunkel enjoyed a US Adult Contemporary No. 1 with the title song, "Breakaway".

The duo's next album, Love on the Airwaves, likewise produced by Kershenbaum, went silver in the UK but yielded only one minor hit single, "Every Little Teardrop" which peaked at #32. Their final two albums, Showdown and Lonesome No More – the last of these issued on Mercury – failed to chart. They provided backing vocals on Elkie Brooks' minor hit cover of their song "The Runaway" in 1979, but this was their final chart appearance. Gallagher and Lyle split in 1980, leaving behind an unreleased ninth album, Living on the Breadline. A song recorded for this set, "A Heart in New York", was covered by Art Garfunkel for his album Scissors Cut and became a major US Adult Contemporary hit for him in 1981.

Gallagher kept a low profile for much of the 1980s, but re-emerged in 1992 as bassist with The Manfreds, a reconvention of 1960s Manfred Mann members and associates. He remained a member until 1999, touring all over the world with the band and appearing on a live album released in 1998.

During his tenure in the band, he co-founded and served as chairman of PAMRA (Performing Artists Media Rights Association), a UK not-for-profit organisation set up in 1996 as a result of EU directive 92/100/EEC, Article 8(2), which gave performers the right to receive "equitable remuneration", and also served as chairman of the Board. Prior to this, "non-featured artists" (including session and backing musicians, orchestral players and choral singers) did not receive royalties when their performances were broadcast or played in public. Involved in complex rights negotiations over his decade on the board, both nationally and internationally, by 2006, when PAMRA merged with PPL, the society had more than 15,000 members and was paying out millions of pounds in royalties to rank-and-file musicians.

After a spell with Dr Hook as bassist during 1999 and 2000, Gallagher embarked on a solo career as a singer-songwriter, touring the folk club and festival circuits. He also held workshops all over the British Isles for aspiring songwriters.

In 2010, Gallagher reunited with Lyle for two concerts in their former hometown of Largs in aid of Haylie House, a residential care home in the town. The pair subsequently re-formed and performed at two events in 2011: "The Big Gig" at Glasgow's Barrowland nightclub, alongside Marti Pellow, Jim Diamond and Midge Ure, and the MOARE Festival in Faversham, Kent, which was headlined by former Average White Band stalwart Hamish Stuart.

In 2012, the duo undertook a sell-out tour of Scottish venues, under the banner of "The Homecoming Tour"; their 22-song set included all their British chart entries and both their US chart-toppers, as well as "A Heart in New York" and "Willie", in which Gallagher used a harmonica on a harness.

In March 2016, Gallagher and Lyle performed together at the Belfast Nashville Songwriters' Festival. In November 2016, the duo performed for four nights at The Green Hotel in Kinross.

The summer of 2017 saw the duo perform as part of the 'Byre at The Botanics' season in St Andrews, and also at the Belladrum Festival in Inverness and the Albany Theatre in Greenock.

In March 2018, the duo returned to Belfast to perform once more at the Belfast Nashville Songwriters' Festival.

Gallagher has released two solo albums on his own OnSong label: On Stage and At The Edge of the Wave. The latter set includes "Tusitala", a tribute to Robert Louis Stevenson; this song also appeared on the Greentrax CD The Great Tapestry of Scotland.

== Stage musical ==
Caledonia USA, a musical based on the songs of Gallagher and Lyle, was staged in Largs in April 2016. Originally titled "When I'm Dead and Gone", it was subsequently retitled after a new song written specially for the show by Gallagher and Lyle.

== Personal life and honours ==
Gallagher and his wife Diane have four children: Dillon, and Paul (twins) and Julian and Claire (twins). Both Dillon and Julian work in the music industry, the former as a producer and the latter as a songwriter, most notably for 5ive and Kylie Minogue. Benny and Diane Gallagher became great-grandparents in 2013.

Gallagher was made a Companion of LIPA (Liverpool Institute for Performing Arts) by Paul McCartney in 2001 in recognition of his work as a songwriting coach at the college.

On 4 July 2024, Gallagher was presented with an honorary doctorate from The University of the West of Scotland, in a ceremony held at Paisley Abbey. Between 1998 and 2002, he had developed the SMART concept (Scottish Music and Recording Technology) in conjunction with South Ayrshire Council and Scottish Enterprise. This project had led to The University of the West of Scotland (then University of Paisley) inaugurating its BA course in Commercial Music, which has run since 2001 and produced over 1,000 graduates.

== Discography ==
See Gallagher and Lyle

- On Stage (2006, OnSong)
- At The Edge of the Wave (2007, OnSong)
