= Paul Simon discography =

Cataloging of published recordings by Paul Simon

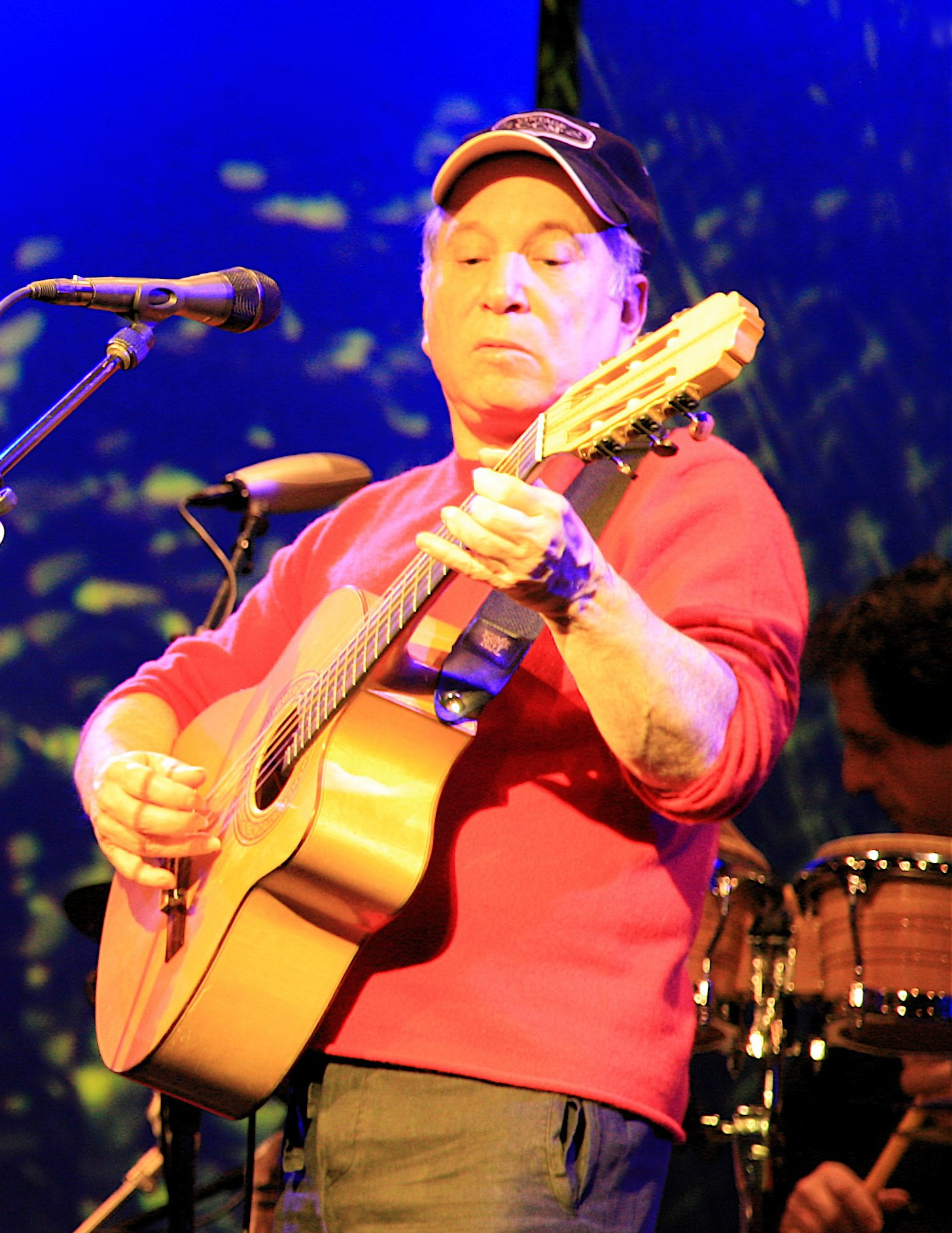
- Simon live in concert in 2007
- Studio albums: 15
- Live albums: 4
- Compilation albums: 11
- Singles: 61
- Video albums: 15
- Music videos: 14
- Box sets: 2

Paul Simon is an American singer-songwriter who gained international recognition as a member of the folk rock duo Simon & Garfunkel, along with Art Garfunkel. Simon split from the duo in 1970. Since then, he has performed as a solo artist while also collaborating with other musicians, including Garfunkel.

Simon started recording music in the 1950s. Over the course of his career, he has released numerous singles, along with multiple studio, live, and compilation albums. According to Nielsen, Simon sold over 7 million albums in the U.S. from 1991 to 2016. His most recent album, Seven Psalms, was released on May 19, 2023.

== Albums ==
=== Studio albums ===
List of studio albums, with selected chart positions, sales figures and certifications
Year	Album details	Peak chart positions										Sales	Certifications
Year	Album details	US	AUS	CAN	GER	NLD	NZ	NOR	SWE	SWI	UK	Sales	Certifications
1965	The Paul Simon Songbook: Released: August 1965; Label: CBS	—	—	—	—	—	—	—	—	—	—		
1972	Paul Simon: Released: January 24, 1972; Label: Columbia	4	5	2	37	2	—	1	1	—	1		RIAA: Platinum
1973	There Goes Rhymin' Simon: Released: May 5, 1973; Label: Columbia	2	7	3	—	—	—	6	1	—	4		RIAA: Platinum; BPI: Gold
1975	Still Crazy After All These Years: Released: October 6, 1975; Label: Columbia	1	39	8	—	11	24	8	9	—	6		RIAA: Gold; BPI: Gold; MC: Platinum
1980	One-Trick Pony: Released: August 12, 1980; Label: Warner Bros.	12	15	23	—	—	6	2	9	—	17		RIAA: Gold; BPI: Silver
1983	Hearts and Bones: Released: November 4, 1983; Label: Warner Bros.	35	99	50	51	14	—	3	11	25	34		
1986	Graceland: Released: August 25, 1986; Label: Warner Bros.	3	1	1	2	1	1	6	4	1	1	WW: 16,000,000	RIAA: 5× Platinum; ARIA: 8× Platinum; BPI: 9× Platinum; BVMI: 3× Gold; NVPI: Platinum; RMNZ: 2× Platinum; SNEP: Platinum
1990	The Rhythm of the Saints: Released: October 16, 1990; Label: Warner Bros.	4	3	1	11	2	6	6	8	3	1		RIAA: 2× Platinum; ARIA: Platinum; BPI: 2× Platinum; BVMI: Gold; IFPI SWI: Gold; MC: 2× Platinum; RMNZ: Platinum
1997	Songs from The Capeman: Released: November 18, 1997; Label: Warner Bros.	42	171	—	26	41	—	32	36	49	83		
2000	You're the One: Released: October 3, 2000; Label: Warner Bros.	19	134	8	17	41	—	9	24	40	20	US: 505,000	RIAA: Gold; BPI: Silver
2006	Surprise: Released: May 9, 2006; Label: Warner Bros.	14	73	31	36	20	—	20	10	55	4	US: 296,000	BPI: Gold
2011	So Beautiful or So What: Released: April 8, 2011; Label: Hear Music	4	41	7	20	6	23	2	4	21	6	US: 375,000	BPI: Silver
2016	Stranger to Stranger: Released: June 3, 2016; Label: Concord	3	24	4	14	8	8	9	9	9	1	US: 143,000	BPI: Silver
2018	In the Blue Light: Released: September 7, 2018; Label: Legacy	70	173	91	36	16	—	—	33	14	10		
2023	Seven Psalms: Released: May 19, 2023; Label: Owl/Legacy	153	—	—	69	31	—	—	—	38	28		
"—" denotes a recording that did not chart or was not released in that territory.

=== Live albums ===
List of live albums, with selected chart positions, sales figures and certifications
Year	Album details	Peak chart positions						Certifications
Year	Album details	US	AUS	GER	NLD	NOR	UK	Certifications
1974	Paul Simon in Concert: Live Rhymin': Released: March 1974; Label: Columbia	33	20	—	—	19	—	RIAA: Gold
1991	Paul Simon's Concert in the Park: Released: November 5, 1991; Label: Warner Bros.	74	91	—	25	—	60	BPI: Silver
2012	Live in New York City: Released: September 18, 2012; Label: Hear Music/Concord	95	—	—	—	—	150	
2017	Paul Simon – The Concert in Hyde Park: Released: June 9, 2017; Label: Sony Legacy	—	—	28	61	—	—	
2026	Paul Simon – The Quiet Celebration Concert: Released: October 9, 2026; Label: Sony Legacy							
"—" denotes a recording that did not chart or was not released in that territory.

=== Compilations ===
List of compilation albums, with selected chart positions and certifications
Year	Album details	Peak chart positions										Certifications
Year	Album details	US	AUS	FIN	GER	NLD	NZ	NOR	SWE	SWI	UK	Certifications
1977	Greatest Hits, Etc.: Released: November 1977; Label: Columbia	18	22	—	—	—	16	—	—	—	6	RIAA: Platinum; BPI: Gold; MC: Platinum
1988	Negotiations and Love Songs: Released: October 18, 1988; Label: Warner Bros.	110	27	—	—	—	5	—	—	—	17	RIAA: Platinum; BPI: Platinum; RMNZ: Platinum
1991	Born at the Right Time: The Best of Paul Simon: Released: 1991; Label: Warner Bros.	—	20	—	—	—	47	—	—	—	—	
1993	The Paul Simon Anthology: Released: 1993; Label: Warner Bros.	—	14	—	—	—	6	—	—	—	—	ARIA: Platinum; BPI: Silver
2000	Greatest Hits: Shining Like a National Guitar: Released: May 8, 2000; Label: Warner Bros.	—	44	25	59	12	30	5	14	23	6	BPI: Gold; ARIA: Platinum; MC: Gold
2002	The Paul Simon Collection: On My Way, Don't Know Where I'm Goin': Released: November 5, 2002; Label: Warner Bros.	57	134	—	71	—	—	—	22	—	—	
2006	Recorded as Jerry Landis: Released: July 20, 2006; Label: Laserlight	—	—	—	—	—	—	—	—	—	—	
2007	The Essential Paul Simon: Released: June 26, 2007; Label: Warner Bros.	42	—	—	—	26	29	—	—	—	12	BPI: Gold
2009	This Better Be Good: Released: June 1, 2009; Label: Rhino Custom Products/ Starbucks Entertainment	60	—	—	—	—	—	—	—	—	—	
2011	Songwriter: Released: October 24, 2011; Label: Sony	141	—	—	—	—	—	—	—	—	—	
2013	Over the Bridge of Time: A Paul Simon Retrospective (1964–2011): Released: October 15, 2013; Label: Legacy Recordings	?	?	?	?	?	?	?	?	?	?	
2015	The Ultimate Collection: Released: April 12, 2015; Label: Sony	—	38	—	—	—	9	—	—	—	1	BPI: Platinum
"—" denotes a recording that did not chart or was not released in that territory.

=== Box sets ===
List of box sets, with selected chart positions and certifications
Year	Album details	Peak chart positions	Certifications
Year	Album details	US	Certifications
1993	Paul Simon 1964/1993: Released: September 28, 1993; Label: Warner Bros.	173	RIAA: Gold
2004	The Studio Recordings, 1972–2000: Released: June 29, 2004; Label: Rhino	—	
"—" denotes a recording that did not chart or was not released in that territory.

== Singles ==
- NB: This discography does not include singles released under the pseudonym "Tom & Jerry" with Art Garfunkel, or singles released by Simon & Garfunkel

=== Singles recorded under pseudonyms ===
Year	A-side / B-side	Chart positions	Ref(s)
Year	A-side / B-side	US	Ref(s)
1958	"True or False" / "Teenage Fool"^{[A]}	—	
1959	"Anna Belle" / "Loneliness"^{[B]}	—	
1959	"Don't Take the Stars" / "So Tenderly"^{[C]}	—	
1960	"Just a Boy" / "Shy"^{[B]}	—	
1960	"Just a Boy" / "I'd Like to Be"^{[B]}	—	
1960	"All Through the Night" / "(I Begin) To Think Again of You"^{[C]}	—	
1960	"Swanee" / "Toot, Toot, Tootsie, Goodbye"^{[B]}	—	
1961	"I Wish I Weren't in Love" / "I'm Lonely"^{[B]}	—	
1961	"Play Me a Sad Song" / "It Means a Lot to Them"^{[B]}	—	
1961	"Motorcycle" / "I Don't Believe Them"^{[D]}	99	
1962	"Express Train" / "Wildflower"^{[D]}	—	
1962	"Cry, Little Boy, Cry" / "Get Up and Do the Wobble"^{[D]}	—	
1962	"The Lone Teen Ranger" / "Lisa"^{[B]}	97	
1962	"Cards of Love" / "Noise"^{[D]}	—	
1963	"He Was My Brother" / "Carlos Dominguez"^{[E]}	—	
"—" denotes releases that did not chart or was not released.

Notes

- A as True Taylor
- B as Jerry Landis
- C as a member of The Mystics
- D as a member of Tico & The Triumphs
- E as Paul Kane

=== Solo singles ===
Year	Title 'A' / Title 'B'	Chart positions										Album
Year	Title 'A' / Title 'B'	US Hot 100	US Cashbox	US AC	US Main	UK	CAN	AUS	FRA	NLD	NOR	Album
1965	"I Am a Rock" / "Leaves That Are Green" ^{[A]}	—	—	—	—	—	—	—	—	—	—	The Paul Simon Songbook
1972	"Mother and Child Reunion" / "Paranoia Blues"	4	4	4	—	5	4	5	—	6	3	Paul Simon
1972	"Me and Julio Down by the Schoolyard" / "Congratulations"	22	7	6	—	15	6	40	—	26	—	Paul Simon
1972	"Duncan" / "Run That Body Down"	52	58	30	—	—	—	86^{[B]}	—	—	—	Paul Simon
1973	"Kodachrome" / "Tenderness"	2	2	2	—	—	2	31	8	15	—	There Goes Rhymin' Simon
1973	"Loves Me Like a Rock" / "Learn How to Fall" ^{[C]}	2	1	1	—	39	5	30	—	27	—	There Goes Rhymin' Simon
1973	"American Tune" / "One Man's Ceiling Is Another Man's Floor"	35	27	8	—	—	—	—	—	(Note: "American Tune" did not chart in the Dutch Single Top 30, but peaked at number 6 in the Single Tip charts.)	—	There Goes Rhymin' Simon
1973	"Take Me to the Mardi Gras" / "Something So Right"	—	—	—	—	7	—	—	—	(Note: "Take Me To The Mardi Gras" did not chart in the Dutch Single Top 30, but peaked at number 9 in the Single Tip charts.)	—	There Goes Rhymin' Simon
1973	"Something So Right"	—	—	—	—	—	—	10	10	—	—	There Goes Rhymin' Simon
1973	"St. Judy's Comet"	—	—	—	—	—	—	—	9	—	—	There Goes Rhymin' Simon
1974	"The Sound of Silence" / "Mother and Child Reunion"	—	97	—	—	—	—	—	—	—	—	Paul Simon in Concert: Live Rhymin'
1975	"Gone at Last" with Phoebe Snow and The Jessy Dixon Singers / "Tenderness"	23	20	9	—	—	—	95	—	(Note: "Gone At Last" did not chart in the Dutch Single Top 30, but peaked at number 20 in the Single Tip charts.)	—	Still Crazy After All These Years
1975	"50 Ways to Leave Your Lover" / "Some Folks' Lives Roll Easy"	1	1	1	—	23	1	35	2	(Note: "50 Ways To Leave Your Lover" did not chart in the Dutch Single Top 30, but peaked at number 2 in the Single Tip charts.)	—	Still Crazy After All These Years
1976	"Still Crazy After All These Years" / "I Do It for Your Love"	40	45	5	—	—	—	—	10	—	—	Still Crazy After All These Years
1976	"Have a Good Time"	—	—	—	—	—	—	—	9	—	—	Still Crazy After All These Years
1977	"Slip Slidin' Away" / "Something So Right" ^{[D]}	5	6	4	—	36	2	35	10	—	—	Greatest Hits, Etc.
1978	"Wonderful World" (with Art Garfunkel and James Taylor) / "Wooden Planes" (Art Garfunkel solo)	17	15	1	—	—	5	47	—	—	—	Watermark
1978	"Stranded in a Limousine" / "Have a Good Time"	—	—	—	—	—	—	—	—	—	—	Greatest Hits, Etc.
1980	"Late in the Evening" / "How The Heart Approaches What It Yearns"	6	9	7	—	58	19	34	—	11	—	One-Trick Pony
1980	"One-Trick Pony" / "Long, Long Day"	40	52	17	—	—	—	—	—	—	—	One-Trick Pony
1981	"Oh, Marion" / "God Bless the Absentee"	—	—	—	—	—	—	—	—	—	—	One-Trick Pony
1983	"The Blues" (with Randy Newman) / "Same Girl" (Randy Newman solo)	51	—	36	—	—	—	100	—	48	—	Trouble in Paradise
1983	"Allergies" / "Think Too Much (B)"	44	48	26	—	—	—	—	—	47	—	Hearts and Bones
1984	"Think Too Much (A)" / "Song About the Moon"	—	—	—	—	—	—	—	—	—	—	Hearts and Bones
1986	"You Can Call Me Al" / "Gumboots"	23	26	15	42	4	11	2	16	5	—	Graceland
1986	"Graceland" / "Hearts and Bones"	81	69	34	38	98	71	62	—	79	—	Graceland
1987	"The Boy in the Bubble" / "Crazy Love, Vol. II"	86	—	—	15	26	—	46	—	16	—	Graceland
1987	"Diamonds on the Soles of Her Shoes" / "All Around the World or the Myth of Fingerprints"	—	—	—	—	77	—	69	—	85	—	Graceland
1987	"Under African Skies" / "I Know What I Know"	—	—	—	—	—	—	—	—	—	—	Graceland
1988	"Mother and Child Reunion" / Train in The Distance"	—	—	—	—	—	—	—	—	—	—	Negotiations and Love Songs
1990	"The Obvious Child" ^{[E]} "The Rhythm of The Saints"	92	–	–	21	15	28	42	–	12	–	The Rhythm of the Saints
1990	"Proof" / "The Cool, Cool River"	—	—	—	—	89	—	134	—	—	—	The Rhythm of the Saints
1990	"Born at the Right Time" / "Further to Fly"	—	—	—	—	107	—	—	—	—	—	The Rhythm of the Saints
1991	"Still Crazy After All These Years" (live) / The Sound of Silence (live)	—	—	—	—	—	—	—	—	—	—	Paul Simon's Concert in the Park
1995	"Something So Right" (with Annie Lennox)	—	—	—	—	44	—	—	—	—	—	Medusa
2000	"Old"	—	—	—	—	—	—	—	—	—	—	You're the One
2000	"You're the One"	—	—	—	—	—	—	—	—	—	—	You're the One
2002	"Father and Daughter" / "Father and Daughter (Instrumental)"	—	—	20	—	—	—	—	—	—	—	The Wild Thornberrys Movie
2006	"Father and Daughter" / "Another Galaxy"	—	—	—	—	31	—	—	—	—	—	Surprise
2006	"That's Me"	—	—	—	—	156	—	—	—	—	—	Surprise
2006	"Outrageous"	—	—	—	—	194	—	—	—	—	—	Surprise
2010	"Getting Ready for Christmas Day"	—	—	—	—	—	—	—	—	—	—	So Beautiful or So What
2011	"The Afterlife"^{[F]}	—	—	—	50	—	—	—	—	—	—	So Beautiful or So What
2012	"The Boxer" (with Jerry Douglas feat. Mumford & Sons)	—	—	—	—	97	—	—	—	—	—	Babel
2016	"Wristband"^{[G]}	—	—	—	—	—	—	—	—	—	—	Stranger to Stranger
2016	"Cool Papa Bell"	—	—	—	—	—	—	—	—	—	—	Stranger to Stranger
2016	"The Werewolf"	—	—	—	—	—	—	—	—	—	—	Stranger to Stranger

Notes

- A Released only in the UK as CBS 201797
- B Only the B-Side 'Run That Body Down' charted in Australia.
- C A-side with the Dixie Hummingbirds
- D A-side with the Oak Ridge Boys
- E Also charted at No. 24 on the Modern Rock Tracks chart.
- F Charted at No. 4 on the Adult Alternative Songs chart.
- G Charted at No. 14 on the Adult Alternative Songs chart.

== Other appearances ==
=== Studio ===
Year	Song	Album	Notes
1997	"Ten Years"	Carnival!	Originally recorded for The Oprah Winfrey Show
2010	"Biko"	And I'll Scratch Yours	Released as a single in 2010, then featured on I'll Scratch Yours in 2013

=== Live ===
Year	Song	Album
1994	"Graceland" (live version)	The Unplugged Collection, Volume One
2010	"You Can Call Me Al"	The 25th Anniversary Rock & Roll Hall Of Fame Concerts
2010	"The Wanderer" (with Dion DiMucci)	The 25th Anniversary Rock & Roll Hall Of Fame Concerts
2010	"Here Comes the Sun" (with David Crosby and Graham Nash)	The 25th Anniversary Rock & Roll Hall Of Fame Concerts

=== Guest ===
Year	Song	Album
1989	"Written on the Subway Wall"/"Little Star" (with Dion)	Yo Frankie
1996	"Rockabilly Music" and "A Mile Out of Memphis" (with Carl Perkins)	Go Cat Go
2005	"I Do It for Your Love" (with Herbie Hancock)	Possibilities
2007	"Fast Car" (with Wyclef Jean)	Carnival Vol. II: Memoirs of an Immigrant
2012	"The Boxer" (with Jerry Douglas and Mumford & Sons)	Traveler and Babel
2015	"New York Is My Home" (with Dion)	New York Is My Home
2020	"Song for Sam Cooke (Here in America)" (with Dion)	Blues with Friends
2024	"Um vento passou"	Milton + Esperanza

== Videography ==
- 1977 The Paul Simon Special (TV, bootleg DVD)
- 1981 Paul Simon in Concert (VHS, Laserdisc; DVD 2003, 2008)
- 1987 Graceland: The African Concert (VHS, Laserdisc; DVD 1999)
- 1987 The All-Star Gospel Session (VHS, bootleg DVD)
- 1991 Paul Simon's Concert in the Park (VHS, Laserdisc; DVD 2018)
- 2000 You're the One—In Concert (DVD)
- 2009 Paul Simon and Friends: The Library of Congress Gershwin Prize for Popular Song (DVD, Blu-ray)
- 2011 So Beautiful or So What (Deluxe Limited Edition) (CD/DVD)
- 2012 Live in New York City (DVD, Blu-ray)
- 2017 The Concert in Hyde Park (DVD, Blu-ray)

=== Music videos ===
Year	Title	Album
1980	"Late in the Evening"	One-Trick Pony
1984	"René and Georgette Magritte with Their Dog after the War"	Hearts and Bones
1984	"Think Too Much (a)"	Hearts and Bones
1986	"You Can Call Me Al" (2 versions)	Graceland
1986	"The Boy in the Bubble"	Graceland
1987	"Diamonds on the Soles of Her Shoes"	Graceland
1988	"Me and Julio Down by the Schoolyard"	Negotiations and Love Songs
1990	"The Obvious Child"	The Rhythm of the Saints
1990	"Proof"	The Rhythm of the Saints
1993	"Thelma"	Paul Simon 1964/1993
2002	"Father and Daughter"	The Wild Thornberrys Movie Soundtrack and Surprise
2006	"Outrageous"	Surprise
2010	"Getting Ready for Christmas Day" (2 versions)	So Beautiful or So What
2016	"Wristband"	Stranger to Stranger
