= Paul Simon in Concert =

Video by Paul Simon
- Recorded: October 8, 1980
- Venue: Tower Theater (Pennsylvania)

Paul Simon in Concert (also released under the titles Live at the Tower Theatre and Live from Philadelphia) is a live concert video recording by Paul Simon and his touring band, recorded in Philadelphia, United States, during his 1980 tour in support of his One-Trick Pony album.

== Concert and release details ==
Paul Simon in Concert dates from October 8, 1980, when singer-songwriter Paul Simon performed a concert at the Tower Theater outside Philadelphia as part of his "One-Trick Pony" tour which played in Europe and the United States in support of the recently released film and album of that name. Accompanying Simon on that tour and this concert (and also seen in the film) was a band of top U.S. backing musicians including Steve Gadd on drums, Tony Levin on bass, Richard Tee on keyboards and Eric Gale on lead electric guitar. Simon performs with an electric guitar for much of the concert, which features songs from his previous solo albums (plus "The Boxer" and "The Sound of Silence" from Simon and Garfunkel days), plus "Ace in the Hole", "One-Trick Pony", "Jonah" and "Late in the Evening" from One-Trick Pony. The concert was recorded and originally released as a VHS video and a LaserDisc under this title. This concert had been widely bootlegged on CD due to the quality of the performances of classic Simon songs as well as now-rare live recordings of songs from One-Trick Pony.

In November 2003, the recording was released on DVD with the title Live at the Tower Theatre. The original recording was reproduced in surround sound and the DVD's extra features include biographies of the band members from the One-Trick Pony film and soundtrack including Richard Tee and Eric Gale. It was subsequently released again in 2008 by Eagle Rock Entertainment under the title Live from Philadelphia (on some versions with the additional wording "Greatest Hits Live"), receiving 7/10 ratings from PopMatters' Guy Crucianelli and Modern Drummer's Jeff Potter.

== Track listing ==
- "Me and Julio Down by the Schoolyard"
- "Still Crazy After All These Years"
- "Ace in the Hole"
- "Something So Right"
- "One-Trick Pony"
- "Jonah"
- "50 Ways to Leave Your Lover"
- "Late in the Evening"
- "American Tune"
- "The Boxer"
- "The Sound of Silence"
