= The Paul Simon Collection: On My Way, Don't Know Where I'm Goin' =

Compilation album by Paul Simon
- Released: November 5, 2002
- Genres: Folk rock; pop
- Length: 1:43:38
- Label: Warner Bros. Records

Paul Simon chronology
You're the One (2000)	The Paul Simon Collection: On My Way, Don't Know Where I'm Goin' (2002)	The Studio Recordings, 1972–2000 (2004)

The Paul Simon Collection: On My Way, Don't Know Where I'm Goin' is a compilation album by Paul Simon released on November 5, 2002.

== Content ==
The album includes live versions of the Simon & Garfunkel songs "Mrs. Robinson" and "Bridge over Troubled Water".

== Reception ==
Professional ratings
Review scores
Source	Rating
AllMusic	3.5/5 stars
The Encyclopedia of Popular Music	3/5 stars
The Rolling Stone Album Guide	4/5 stars

In a review for the album on AllMusic, Stephen Thomas Erlewine stated that "hits compilations are hurt by the desire of the artist or the label to cover all aspects of an artist's career" and says that it is a "perfect example of this trait, particularly since so much of it is so good", and that "here idiosyncratic choices take precedent, to the detriment of the overall effect of the album. This results in merely a bad finish to a collection that is, overall, on the money, but it could have been better, fuller overview with just a little more thought, and the collection suffers because of these few poor choices."

== Track listing ==
=== Disc one ===
1. Mother and Child Reunion – 3:01
2. Me and Julio Down By the Schoolyard – 2:43
3. Kodachrome – 3:33
4. Something So Right – 4:30
5. Loves Me Like a Rock – 3:14
6. 50 Ways to Leave Your Lover – 3:15 (Note: Edited version which cuts out a few seconds of the opening.)
7. Still Crazy After All These Years – 3:25
8. Late in the Evening – 4:02
9. Slip Slidin' Away – 4:45
10. Hearts and Bones – 5:40
11. Diamonds on the Soles of Her Shoes – 5:49
12. The Boy in the Bubble – 4:00
13. Graceland – 4:51
14. You Can Call Me Al – 4:40
15. Spirit Voices – 3:56
16. The Cool, Cool River – 4:33
17. Adios Hermanos – 4:41
18. Love – 3:48
19. Hurricane Eye – 4:13

=== Disc two (live bonus disc) ===
1. American Tune (Live from New York City, 1973) – 4:11
2. Duncan (Live from London, 1973) – 5:27
3. The Coast (Live from Montreux, 2002) – 6:08
4. Mrs. Robinson (Live from New York City, 1999) – 4:17
5. Bridge over Troubled Water (Live from New Orleans, 2001) – 4:56

== Charts ==
Chart (2003–2012)	Peak position
German Albums (Offizielle Top 100)	71
Swedish Albums (Sverigetopplistan)	22
US Billboard 200	57
US Top Catalog Albums (Billboard)	3
