= Negotiations and Love Songs =

Greatest hits album by Paul Simon
- Released: October 18, 1988
- Recorded: 1971–1986
- Studios: Dynamic Sound, Kingston; CBS, New York; CBS, San Francisco; Muscle Shoals Sound, Muscle Shoals; A & R, New York; The Hit Factory, New York; Ovation, Johannesburg; Amigo, Los Angeles
- Genres: Folk rock, folk, worldbeat
- Length: 67:58 (LP); 63:07 (CD)
- Label: Warner Bros.
- Producers: Paul Simon, Russ Titelman, Phil Ramone, Roy Halee, Muscle Shoals Rhythm Section

Paul Simon chronology
Graceland (1986)	Negotiations and Love Songs (1988)	The Rhythm of the Saints (1990)

Negotiations and Love Songs is a compilation album of songs by the American singer-songwriter Paul Simon, released in 1988 by Warner Bros. Records. It consists of songs released from 1971 to 1986. The title of the compilation is taken from a line in the song "Train in the Distance".

Professional ratings
Review scores
Source	Rating
Allmusic	link
Robert Christgau	(B)
Encyclopedia of Popular Music	5/5 stars

== Track listing ==
All tracks are written by Paul Simon, except "Diamonds on the Soles of Her Shoes", co-written by Joseph Shabalala.

Side one
No.	Title	Original release	Length
1.	"Mother and Child Reunion"	Paul Simon (1972)	2:48
2.	"Me and Julio Down by the Schoolyard"	Paul Simon	2:41
3.	"Something So Right"	There Goes Rhymin' Simon (1973)	4:28
4.	"St. Judy's Comet"	There Goes Rhymin' Simon	3:17
5.	"Loves Me Like a Rock"	There Goes Rhymin' Simon	3:18
Total length:			16:32

Side two
No.	Title	Original release	Length
1.	"Kodachrome"	There Goes Rhymin' Simon	3:32
2.	"Have a Good Time"	Still Crazy After All These Years (1975)	3:23
3.	"50 Ways to Leave Your Lover"	Still Crazy After All These Years	3:31
4.	"Still Crazy After All These Years"	Still Crazy After All These Years	3:24
Total length:			13:50

Side three
No.	Title	Original release	Length
1.	"Late in the Evening"	One-Trick Pony (1980)	3:55
2.	"Slip Slidin' Away"	Greatest Hits, Etc. (1977)	4:43
3.	"Hearts and Bones"	Hearts and Bones (1983)	5:38
4.	"Train in the Distance"	Hearts and Bones	4:22
Total length:			18:38

Side four
No.	Title	Original release	Length
1.	"Rene and Georgette Magritte with Their Dog after the War"	Hearts and Bones	3:43
2.	"Diamonds on the Soles of Her Shoes"	Graceland (1986)	5:46
3.	"You Can Call Me Al"	Graceland	4:39
4.	"Graceland^"	Graceland	4:48
Total length:			18:56 67:56

^ "Graceland" appears only on the LP edition of the album.

== Personnel ==
- Paul Simon – vocals, guitar (2–6, 11, 15), acoustic guitar (8, 12), background vocals (10, 16–17), electric guitar (14), six-string electric bass (16)

Additional musicians

- Huk Brown – lead guitar (1)
- Wallace Wilson – rhythm guitar (1)
- Neville Hinds – organ (1)
- Jackie Jackson – bass guitar (1)
- Winston Grennan – drums (1)
- Denzil Laing – percussion (1)
- Larry Knechtel – piano (1)
- Cissy Houston – singer (1)
- Renelle Stafford – singer (1)
- Deirdre Tuck – singer (1)
- Von Eva Sims – singer (1)
- David Spinoza – guitar (2–3)
- Airto Moreira – percussion (2, 12–13)
- Russel George – bass guitar (2)
- Alexander Gafa – guitar (3)
- Bob Cranshaw – electric bass (3)
- Richard Davis – acoustic bass (3)
- Grady Tate – drums (3)
- Bobby James – keyboard (3), electric piano (7)
- Bobby Scott – piano (3)
- Don Elliot – vibes (3)
- Pete Carr – electric guitar (4, 6)
- David Hood – bass guitar (4–6, 9)
- Roger Hawkins – percussion (4–6, 9)
- Barry Beckett – keyboard, vibes (4, 6), electric piano (9)
- The Dixie Hummingbirds – vocal group (5)
- Jimmy Johnson – electric guitar (6)
- Hugh McCracken – electric guitar (7–8, 10)
- Joe Beck – electric guitar (7)
- Tony Levin – bass guitar (7–8, 10)
- Steve Gadd – drums (7–8, 10–12)
- Ralph McDonald – percussion (7–8, 10–11, 16)
- Phil Woods – saxophone solo (7)
- Valerie Simpson – background vocals (7–8)
- Ken Asher – organ (8)
- John Tropea – electric guitar (8)
- Phoebe Snow – vocal background (8)
- Patti Austin – vocal background (8)
- Mike Brecker – saxophone solo (9)
- Eric Gale – electric guitar (10)
- Anthony Jackson – percussion (11), contrabass guitar (12–14)
- Richard Tee – piano (11), Fender Rhodes (12–14)
- The Oak Ridge Boys – vocal group (11)
- Dean Parks – hi-string guitar (12–13)
- Michael Mainieri – vibes (tracks 12–13), marimba (12)
- Marcus Miller – bass guitar (13)
- Jeff Porcaro – drums (13)
- Jess Levy – cello (13)
- Peter Gordon – French horn (13)
- Mark Rivera – alto sax (13)
- Rob Sabino – piano (14)
- Wells Christie – Synclavier (14)
- The Harptones – background vocals (14)
- Chikapa "Ray" Phiri – guitar (15–17)
- Bakithi Kumalo – bass guitar (15–17)
- Isaac Misthali – drums (15–16)
- Youssou N'Dour – percussion (15)
- Babacar Faye – percussion (15)
- Assane Thiam – percussion (15)
- Earl Gardner – trumpet (15)
- Leonard Pickett – tenor sax (15)
- Alex Foster – alto sax (15)
- Ladysmith Black Mambazo – vocals (15)
- Rob Mounsey – synthesizer (16)
- Adrian Belew – guitar synthesizer (16)
- Ronald E. Cuber – bass sax (track 16), baritone sax (16)
- John Faddis – trumpet (16)
- Ronald E. Brecker – trumpet (16)
- Lewis Michael Soloff – trumpet 16)
- Alan Rubin – trumpet (16)
- David W. Bargeron – trombone (16)
- Kim Allan Cissel – trombone (16)
- Morris Goldberg – pennywhistle solo (16)
- Vusi Khumalo – drums (17)
- Makhaya Mahlangu – percussion (17)
- Demola Adepoju – pedal steel guitar (17)
- The Everly Brothers – vocals (17)

Technical

- Paul Simon – producer (1–17), co-arranger (track 16)
- Russ Titelman – producer (12–14)
- Roy Halee – producer (1–2, 12–14), compilation assembler
- Phil Ramone – producer (3, 5, 7–11)
- Muscle Shoals Rhythm Section – producer (4–6)
- Quincy Jones – string arranger (3)
- Dave Mathews – horn arranger (7)
- Bob James – woodwind and string arranger (9)
- Dave Grusin – horn arranger (10)
- The Harptones – background vocal arranger (14)
- George Delerue – orchestration (14)
- Chikapa "Ray" Phiri – co-arranger (16)
- Greg Calbi – mastering
- Robert Mapplethorpe – front cover photo

== Charts ==
=== Weekly charts ===
Chart	Position
Australian ARIA Albums Chart	27
New Zealand Albums Chart	5
UK Albums Chart	17
United States Billboard 200	110

=== Year-end charts ===
Chart (1988)	Position
UK Albums Chart	94

== Certifications ==
Region	Certification	Certified units/sales
France (SNEP)	Gold	100,000^{*}
New Zealand (RMNZ)	Platinum	15,000^{^}
United Kingdom (BPI)	Platinum	300,000^{^}
United States (RIAA)	Platinum	1,000,000^{^}
^{*} Sales figures based on certification alone.^{^} Shipments figures based on certification alone.
