= Greatest Hits, Etc. =

Greatest hits album by Paul Simon
- Released: November 1977
- Recorded: 1971–1977
- Genre: Folk rock
- Length: 51:38
- Label: Columbia
- Producers: Paul Simon, Roy Halee, Phil Ramone

Paul Simon chronology
Still Crazy After All These Years (1975)	Greatest Hits, Etc. (1977)	One-Trick Pony (1980)

Singles from Greatest Hits, Etc.
- 1. "Slip Slidin' Away" Released: September 1977; 2. "Stranded in a Limousine" Released: March 1978

Greatest Hits, Etc. is the first greatest hits album by American singer-songwriter Paul Simon, released in November 1977 by Columbia Records. It was his first compilation, spanning the first six years of his solo career. Its release was prompted by the fact that two years after his last studio album, Simon didn't yet have enough material to release a new full-length album, and his contract with Columbia was finished but a new album was needed to fulfill it. Simon later signed with Warner Bros. Records. The album was initially supposed to be called Blatant Greatest Hits.

The album included two new songs: the smooth ballad "Slip Slidin' Away", a US top 5 hit previously considered for Still Crazy After All These Years, and the upbeat "Stranded in a Limousine", which failed to chart in the US. "Slip Slidin' Away" was not available in any other album until 1988's Negotiations and Love Songs, and "Stranded in a Limousine" was added as a bonus track on the CD reissue of One Trick Pony. Record World said that "Stranded in a Limousine" "has a bit of rhythm and blues added to it, in the form of a good horn arrangement and some strong piano work".

Half of the songs on the album were hit singles (including all of the five top 5 singles Simon achieved in his entire solo career in the US). The rest was filled with the two aforementioned new tracks, some album tracks (particularly the radio favorite "Something So Right"), and live versions of "Duncan" (from the Live Rhymin' recording) and "American Tune". From this diversity came the Etc. on the album title. This collection omits two hits during the period covered by this compilation – the duet with Phoebe Snow, "Gone at Last" and his reunion single with Art Garfunkel, "My Little Town".

The album reached No. 18 in the US and No. 3 in the UK. Originally issued as an LP in 1977 with a gatefold sleeve, it was re-released in 1986 as an LP in a non-gatefold sleeve following the success of the Graceland album. After Paul Simon won Best International Solo Artist at the 1987 Brits Awards, the re-released LP appeared with a 'Brits Award Winner' sticker. The album was also pressed for a short time in CD format by CBS/Columbia Records. The pressing of the CDs was stopped upon the release of Simon's compilation album Negotiations and Love Songs, which was issued on Warner Bros. Records and designed to supersede this album. However, a few cuts, including "Stranded in a Limousine" and "American Tune", were not included on Negotiations. The re-released album re-entered the UK charts for two weeks during January 1987.

Professional ratings
Review scores
Source	Rating
AllMusic	4.5/5 stars
Christgau's Record Guide	A

== Track listing ==
All the songs were written and composed by Paul Simon, and were performed in the studio by Simon accompanied with many of the leading session musicians of the day.

Side one

No.	Title	Length
1.	"Slip Slidin' Away"	4:43
2.	"Stranded in a Limousine"	3:09
3.	"Still Crazy After All These Years"	3:24
4.	"Have a Good Time"	3:25
5.	"Duncan" (live)	5:03
6.	"Me and Julio Down by the Schoolyard"	2:45
7.	"Something So Right"	4:34
Total length:		27:03

Side two

No.	Title	Length
1.	"Kodachrome"	3:32
2.	"I Do It for Your Love"	3:35
3.	"50 Ways to Leave Your Lover"	3:33
4.	"American Tune" (live)	4:09
5.	"Mother and Child Reunion"	2:50
6.	"Loves Me Like a Rock"	3:28
7.	"Take Me to the Mardi Gras"	3:28
Total length:		24:35 51:38

== Charts ==
Chart (1977–1978)	Peak position
Australian Kent Music Report Albums Chart	22
Canadian RPM Albums Chart	17
Dutch Mega Albums Chart	16
Japanese Oricon Albums Chart	69
New Zealand Albums Chart	16
Spanish Albums Chart	26
UK Albums Chart	3
US Billboard Top LPs	18

== Certifications ==
Region	Certification	Certified units/sales
Canada (Music Canada)	Platinum	100,000^{^}
United Kingdom (BPI)	Gold	100,000^{^}
United States (RIAA)	Platinum	1,000,000^{^}
^{^} Shipments figures based on certification alone.
