= This Better Be Good =

Compilation album by Paul Simon
- Released: June 1, 2009
- Recorded: 1972–2009
- Genre: Rock
- Label: Starbucks Entertainment

This Better Be Good is a compilation album by Paul Simon, issued in June 2009 on the Starbucks Entertainment record label in its Opus Collection series (catalog number OPCD-8321). The disc was exclusively available at US branches of the Starbucks stores. The tracks on this album were taken from all of Paul's solo albums (except The Paul Simon Songbook), up to and including the 2006 release Surprise.

The iTunes version of the album included the bonus track, "Questions for the Angels". It was a new track that had not been released in any other form. In 2011, it appeared on Simon's new studio album, So Beautiful or So What. The album was listed on the Billboard 200 in August 2009.

== Track listing ==
1. Kodachrome
2. Peace Like a River
3. Loves Me Like a Rock
4. Late in the Evening
5. Slip Slidin' Away
6. Me and Julio Down by the Schoolyard
7. Diamonds on the Soles of Her Shoes
8. Mother and Child Reunion
9. American Tune
10. Under African Skies
11. Senorita with a Necklace of Tears
12. Bernadette
13. Train in the Distance
14. The Obvious Child
15. Father and Daughter
16. Sure Don't Feel like Love
17. Questions for the Angels (iTunes bonus track; available only on iTunes; not included in the CD version)

== Chart performance ==
The album debuted on the Billboard 200 albums chart at number 60 on July 11, 2009, which was also its peak position. It peaked at number 5 on the Billboard Top Independent Albums chart.
