= Stranded in a Limousine =

Single by Paul Simon

from the album Greatest Hits, Etc.
- B-side: "Have a Good Time"
- Released: May 1978
- Recorded: September 1977
- Length: 3:09
- Label: Columbia
- Songwriter: Simon
- Producers: Simon; Phil Ramone

Paul Simon singles chronology
"Slip Slidin' Away" (1977)	"Stranded in a Limousine" (1978)	"Late in the Evening" (1980)

"Stranded in a Limousine" is a song by the American musician Paul Simon, released as the second single from his first compilation album Greatest Hits, Etc. (1977) in May 1978.

== Background and release ==
"Stranded in a Limousine" was recorded in September 1977 in New York alongside "Slip Slidin' Away". Simon said of writing it:

I came into the studio with a melody line and we started working at it there. My drummer came up with an idea for the rhythm. We added it. Then we added other elements. We used the studio as a medium.

The song is about an urban hoodlum who terrorizes the neighborhood by coming out at night and vanishing in the darkness. It was released as a single in May 1978, with Simon believing Columbia buried the single to warn him about what would happen to Simon without Columbia Records, as the single was released during the height of a contract fight Simon was having with Columbia.

== Critical reception ==
In a review for Record World magazine, the writers note that it has "a bit of rhythm and blues added to it, in the form of a good horn arrangement and some strong piano work." believing that "It should become another of Simon's hits." Cashbox states that "Handclapping, footstamping, popping acoustic guitar and rumbling piano keep everybody running after the "mean individual stranded in the limousine."", adding that "this new tune from the "Greatest Hits" LP ought to ride up the charts in style." The News critic Joel McNally said that "the humorous effect of the rhythm that accompanies the song says as much about exaggerated urban horror stories as the words do." Steve Hoegerman of the Santa Barbara Independent called it "something of a rocker" and "catchy" with notable sound effects such as sirens and screeching tires, and "intriguing but a bit shallow" lyrically. Star-Ledger critic Jay Lustig described it as "sarcastic". The Associated Press called it "one of Simon's oddest tunes."

"Stranded in a Limousine" was included on the 2007 compilation album The Essential Paul Simon. It was also included as a bonus track on the soundtrack for the 1980 film One-Trick Pony, which the song was originally intended for.

Michelle Shocked covered "Stranded in a Limousine" on the 2003 expanded edition release of The Texas Campfire Tapes.

== Charts ==
Chart (1977–1978)	Peak position
US Adult Contemporary (Billboard)	45
