= Recorded as Jerry Landis =

Compilation album by Paul Simon
- Released: 2006
- Recorded: 1957–1963
- Genre: Rock
- Label: LaserLight

Alternative cover

Recorded as Jerry Landis is a compilation album of demo recordings sung by Paul Simon (under his stage name Jerry Landis), except for "Beat Love", recorded by Art Garfunkel (as Artie Garr).

Two of the songs on this compilation - "Loneliness" (MGM K12822, 1959) and "The Lipstick on Your Lips" (re-titled as "I'd Like To Be (The Lipstick on Your Lips)", Warwick, M 588) ) received releases in the era. However, all the recordings on this compilation were previously included on the 1995 compilation Work in Progress - Volume One: Early Recordings, Demos & Outtakes.

Whilst the compilation does not list the original composers of the songs, one song on the compilation is known to be written by Simon, "Loneliness", credited under his stage name. Seven songs, such as An Angel Cries, remain uncredited.

== Track listing ==
1. "A Different Kind of Love" (Don Wolf, Ben Raleigh) – 2:18
2. "Make a Wish" (Martin Hugh) – 2:40
3. "Loneliness" – (Jerry Landis) 2:14
4. "A Good Foundation For Love" (Don Wolf, Ben Raleigh) – 2:03
5. "A Frame Without A Picture" (Hal David, Sherman Edwards) – 2:40
6. "The Lipstick On Your Lips" (Hal David, Sherman Edwards) – 2:11
7. "An Angel Cries" – 2:20
8. "North Wind" (Ruby Fisher) – 2:38
9. "Rock n' Roll Skaters Waltz" (Arlyne Tye, Jo Hanna) – 2:19
10. "Just a Kid" (Ouida Mintz) – 2:43
11. "I Want You In My Stocking" (Mike Anthony, Paul Kaufman) – 2:18
12. "That's How I Feel" – 2:34
13. "Let's Make Pictures" – 2:39
14. "When You Come Back to School" – 2:26
15. "Educated Fool" – 2:12
16. "One Way Love" – 2:49
17. "Bigger and Better Things" (Hal David, Sherman Edwards) – 2:10
18. "Beat Love" - (written and performed by Artie Garr, uncredited) – 2:06
