= In the Blue Light =

- Cover art by Out of Office

Studio album by Paul Simon
- Released: September 7, 2018
- Genre: Pop
- Length: 43:52
- Label: Legacy
- Producer: Paul Simon; Roy Halee

Paul Simon chronology
Stranger to Stranger (2016)	In the Blue Light (2018)	Seven Psalms (2023)

In the Blue Light is the fourteenth solo studio album by American folk rock singer-songwriter Paul Simon. Produced by Paul Simon and Roy Halee, it was released on September 7, 2018, through Legacy Recordings. The album consists of re-recordings of lesser-known songs from Simon's catalog, often altering their original arrangements, harmonic structures, and lyrics. The songs were recorded with guests, including the instrumental ensemble yMusic, guitarist Bill Frisell, trumpeter Wynton Marsalis, and Bryce Dessner. The album's title is a reference to the lyrics in the song "How the Heart Approaches What It Yearns" from the 1980 album One-Trick Pony.

== Unreleased recordings ==
In an interview for CBC Radio, Simon confirmed that more songs were recorded during sessions for the album but ultimately left off the finished record. Outtakes include a number of unspecified songs from You're the One and a re-recording of "The Sound of Silence" with music based on the arrangement of Simon's live version from recent years. It is unknown whether or not these recordings will be released.

== Reception ==
Professional ratings
Aggregate scores
Source	Rating
Metacritic	70/100
Review scores
Source	Rating
AllMusic	3/5 stars
The A.V. Club	B−
The Guardian	4/5 stars
The Independent	3/5 stars
Rolling Stone	3/5 stars
Vice	A−

In the Blue Light was released to favorable reviews. At Metacritic, which assigns a normalized rating out of 100 to reviews from mainstream publications, the album received an average score of 70, based on eleven reviews.

Dave Simpson at The Guardian gave the album four stars and said that "generally, sparser arrangements allow more space for Simon’s dazzling imagery and oblique but relevant ruminations on [several] subjects." Jesse Hassenger of The A.V. Club gave the album a B− and wrote, "It would be easy to get bogged down in treating Blue Light as a compare/contrast exercise, but what’s most impressive about is the way that it sounds more or less of a piece as its own record." David Browne from Rolling Stone wrote that, "At its best, In the Blue Light amounts to a dream set list for devoted PaulHeads who wish he’d do entire shows of rarities." Stephen Thomas Erlewine of Allmusic opined that "Everything on In the Blue Light is deliberate, gentle, and subtle, placing as much emphasis on the words and melody as the instrumentation, which isn't necessarily the case with the dense original albums."

== Track listing ==
All tracks are written by Paul Simon.

No.	Title	Original album	Length
1.	"One Man's Ceiling Is Another Man's Floor"	There Goes Rhymin' Simon (1973)	4:00
2.	"Love"	You're the One (2000)	4:10
3.	"Can't Run But"	The Rhythm of the Saints (1990)	3:30
4.	"How the Heart Approaches What It Yearns"	One-Trick Pony (1980)	4:30
5.	"Pigs, Sheep and Wolves"	You're the One (2000)	4:00
6.	"René and Georgette Magritte with Their Dog After the War"	Hearts and Bones (1983)	4:44
7.	"The Teacher"	You're the One (2000)	3:45
8.	"Darling Lorraine"	You're the One (2000)	7:13
9.	"Some Folks' Lives Roll Easy"	Still Crazy After All These Years (1975)	4:00
10.	"Questions for the Angels"	So Beautiful or So What (2011)	4:00
Total length:			43:52

== Personnel ==
Musicians

- Paul Simon – vocals, acoustic guitar (2, 10), electric guitar (6), harmonica (10), percussion (1, 2, 5, 7, 8, 10), harmonium (2)
- Odair Assad – guitar (7)
- Sérgio Assad – guitar (7)
- Walter Blanding – saxophone (5, 7)
- Dan Block – clarinet (5)
- Edie Brickell – finger snaps (1)
- CJ Camerieri – trumpet (1)
- Chris Crenshaw – trombone (5)
- Bryce Dessner – arrangement (3)
- Sullivan Fortner – piano (4, 9), celeste (9), harmonium and chromelodeon (10)
- Jack DeJohnette – drums (9)
- Marion Felder – drums (5)
- Bill Frisell – electric guitar (2, 8, 10)
- Steve Gadd – drums (2, 8)
- Renaud Garcia-Fons – bass (2, 7), percussion (7)
- Wycliffe Gordon – tuba (5)
- Marco Antônio Guimarães – original arrangement (3)
- Jamey Haddad – percussion (7)
- Skip LaPlante – percussion (10)
- Joe Lovano – saxophone (9)
- Wynton Marsalis – trumpet (4, 5), arrangement (5)
- Rob Moose – arrangement (8)
- Vincent Nguini – electric guitar (8)
- Jim Oblon – guitar (1)
- John Patitucci – bass (4, 8, 10)
- Marcus Printup – trumpet (5)
- Herlin Riley – tambourine (5)
- Nate Smith – drums (1, 4)
- Robert Sirota – arrangement (6)
- Andy Snitzer – saxophone (1)
- Mark Stewart – acoustic guitar (8)
- Joel Wenhardt – piano (1)
- yMusic – featured ensemble (3, 6, 8)
  - CJ Camerieri – trumpet, piccolo trumpet
  - Alex Sopp – flute, alto flute
  - Hideaki Aomori – clarinet, bass clarinet
  - Rob Moose – violin
  - Nadia Sirota – viola
  - Gabriel Cabezas – cello

Technical personnel

- Paul Simon – producer
- Roy Halee – producer, mixing
- Andy Smith – engineer
- Chris Allen – additional engineer
- Brett Mayer – additional engineer
- Owen Mullholland – additional engineer
- Nate Odden – assistant engineer
- Matt Soares – assistant engineer
- Grant Valentine – assistant engineer
- Jim Corona – session coordinator
- Greg Calbi – mastering

== Charts ==
Chart performance for In the Blue Light
Chart (2018)	Peak position
Australian Albums (ARIA)	173
Austrian Albums (Ö3 Austria)	29
Belgian Albums (Ultratop Flanders)	21
Belgian Albums (Ultratop Wallonia)	55
Canadian Albums (Billboard)	91
Czech Albums (ČNS IFPI)	40
Dutch Albums (Album Top 100)	16
French Albums (SNEP)	159
German Albums (Offizielle Top 100)	36
Irish Albums (IRMA)	24
Japanese Albums (Oricon)	106
Scottish Albums (OCC)	7
Spanish Albums (Promusicae)	15
Swedish Albums (Sverigetopplistan)	33
Swiss Albums (Schweizer Hitparade)	14
UK Albums (OCC)	10
US Billboard 200	70
