= Seven Psalms =

Studio album by Paul Simon
- Released: May 19, 2023
- Recorded: 2019–2023
- Genre: Acoustic
- Length: 33:02
- Labels: Owl; Legacy
- Producers: Paul Simon; Kyle Crusham

Paul Simon chronology
In the Blue Light (2018)	Seven Psalms (2023)

Seven Psalms is the fifteenth solo studio album by American musician Paul Simon. It was released on May 19, 2023, through Owl Records and Legacy Recordings. The album was conceived as a seven-part piece meant to be listened to in its entirety and is a completely acoustic performance.

The album is Simon's first since In the Blue Light (2018) and his first of new material since Stranger to Stranger (2016). Guests on the album include Voces8 and Simon's wife, Edie Brickell.

== Background ==
Simon has said that the idea for the album came to him in what he described as a powerful dream he had on January 15, 2019, in which a voice told him “You’re working on a piece called Seven Psalms.” He said that he wrote the dream down and originally had no intention of doing anything with it. He said that he would wake up between 3:30 and 5:00 A.M. two to three nights a week to write lyrics for the project. The main inspiration for the album was the Book of Psalms. Simon has said in interviews that the album is about "the subject of God". The album's cover art was taken from Thomas Moran's Two Owls. The album was not broken into individual songs, but instead was intended to be listened to as one long piece. Its digital incarnations keep this sequencing intact, and CD copies are not indexed individually.

On April 12, 2023, Simon posted a trailer video on YouTube announcing the album and explaining its background.

== Critical reception ==
Professional ratings
Review scores
Source	Rating
AllMusic	4/5 stars
The Daily Telegraph	4/5 stars
Pitchfork	7.5/10

Seven Psalms received positive reviews from music critics. Jon Pareles at The New York Times designated it a Critic's Pick, extolling it as "observant, elliptical, perpetually questioning and quietly encompassing". Chris Willman at Variety called it "a testament to how inquisitive and engaged an artist can be this late in a career [...] Seven Psalms is unlike any other Simon album in almost too many ways to list." Michaelangelo Matos, reviewing for Rolling Stone, interpreted it as iconic of the spirituality at the center of his discography. Poppie Platt at The Telegraph dubbed the effort "a half-shuttered window into the world of the man behind some of the world's most famous songs. If only Simon were to pry open said window slightly wider, one would feel more fulfilled." Stephen Thomas Erlewine at AllMusic found it continually revealing: "At first, the record can seem like a tone poem, a meditation of mortality and spirituality, yet each subsequent listen reveals a moment of grace or insight that helps pull the entirety of the project into relief."

The album has been compared to David Bowie's Blackstar and Leonard Cohen's You Want It Darker, the artists’ final albums released in 2016.

== Track listing ==
Note that the CD indexes the album as one continuous track, although the album packaging acknowledges the work's individual track titles.

All tracks are written by Paul Simon.

Seven Psalms track listing
No.	Title	Length
1.	"The Lord"	6:08
2.	"Love Is Like a Braid"	3:05
3.	"My Professional Opinion"	5:24
4.	"Your Forgiveness"	5:34
5.	"Trail of Volcanoes"	2:23
6.	"The Sacred Harp"	6:45
7.	"Wait"	3:43
Total length:		33:02

== Personnel ==
All personnel and credits adapted from album liner notes.

Musicians

- Paul Simon – guitar, composer, lyricist, producer
- Jamey Haddad – hadphoon, hadjira, bass drum, almglocken
- Bob Sirota – arrangements (4)
- Gabriel Cabezas – cello (4)
- Nina Stern – chalumeau (4)
- Alex Sopp – flute (4)
- Paul Morton – theorbo (4)
- Nadia Sirota – viola (4)
- Edie Brickell – vocals (6, 7)

Production

- Kyle Crusham – producer, engineer
- David Hinnet – recording
- Andy Smith – additional recording
- Greg Calbi – mastering
- Patrick Dillett – mixing
- Geoff Gans – art direction, design
- Jeff Kramer – management

== Charts ==
Chart performance for Seven Psalms
Chart (2023)	Peak position
Belgian Albums (Ultratop Flanders)	25
Belgian Albums (Ultratop Wallonia)	75
Dutch Albums (Album Top 100)	31
German Albums (Offizielle Top 100)	69
Irish Albums (IRMA)	67
Japanese Albums (Oricon)	47
Japanese Hot Albums (Billboard Japan)	64
Portuguese Albums (AFP)	27
Scottish Albums (Official Charts)	7
Swiss Albums (Schweizer Hitparade)	38
UK Albums (Official Charts)	28
US Billboard 200	153
US Top Rock Albums (Billboard)	25
