= One-Trick Pony (film) =

1980 film directed by Robert M. Young

- Theatrical release poster
- Directed by: Robert M. Young
- Written by: Paul Simon
- Produced by: Michael Tannen
- Starring: Paul Simon; Blair Brown; Rip Torn; Joan Hackett
- Cinematography: Dick Bush
- Edited by: Edward Beyer; Barry Malkin; David Ray
- Music by: Paul Simon
- Production company: Warner Bros. Pictures
- Distributed by: Warner Bros. Pictures
- Release date: October 3, 1980
- Running time: 98 minutes
- Country: United States
- Language: English
- Budget: $8 million
- Box office: $843,215

One-Trick Pony is a 1980 American drama film directed by Robert M. Young and written by and starring Paul Simon. It also stars Blair Brown, Rip Torn, Joan Hackett, Mare Winningham, Michael Pearlman, Lou Reed in his feature film debut, and Allen Garfield (credited under his birth name, Allen Goorwitz). Receiving mixed reviews from critics, the film bombed at the box office.

The song "Late in the Evening" from the film's soundtrack hit number 6 on the Billboard Hot 100 chart, while the title song peaked at number 40. After years of being available only on videocassette and laserdisc, One-Trick Pony was released by Warner Home Video on DVD in 2009.

== Plot ==
Jonah Levin, a once-popular folk-rock musician, flies into Cleveland with his band, keyboardist Clarence Franklin, drummer Danny Duggin, lead guitarist Lee-Andrew Parker and bass guitarist John Dibatista, for a gig ("Late in the Evening"). They go to the Agora Theatre and perform a set as an opening act to the B-52's ("One-Trick Pony"). Afterwards, Jonah meets one of the club's waitresses backstage, Modeena, and goes home with her. They talk about their lives, Jonah speaking fondly of his son, Matty, and revealing he is separated from his wife, Marion, while Modeena shares her aspirations of becoming a singer. They bathe together, and Jonah stays the night.

Early the next morning, Jonah leaves Modeena's for his hotel room and calls Marion ("How the Heart Approaches What It Yearns"). She tells Jonah she has got an appointment they both need to attend to sign divorce papers, which Jonah is reluctant to do. In the day, Jonah drives the band across the state while Danny reads aloud from a newspaper, reviewing the show at the Agora in a negative light, comparing it against Jonah's hit performances in the 1960s ("God Bless the Absentee").

Jonah arrives back home in New York City early, due to many of the gigs in Ohio being cancelled, and visits Marion. She expresses her concern over Matty aspiring to be a songwriter and asks Jonah to talk him out of it. Jonah insists there is nothing wrong his career choice and takes offense at Marion's belief that rock and roll is immature. The argument escalates and the focus of it turns to their relationship. Marion starts to cry, leading Jonah to apologise and comfort her while she laments over his absence throughout the years.

Jonah and Matty spend time together, before Jonah and Marion meet with their lawyers to sign the divorce papers ("Nobody"). Following this, he meets record executive Walter Fox and DJ Cal Van Damp to discuss making a new album. Jonah plays two new songs ("Ace in the Hole" and "Long, Long Day") but is repeatedly interrupted. During the meeting, he becomes acquainted with Walter's wife, Lonnie, and is criticized harshly by Cal.

The band continues their string of shows ("Ace in the Hole" and "Long, Long Day") and travels interstate for another three ("Jonah"), only to find the club closed down. The band are disheartened and Clarence threatens to quit. Dejected, they all fly back to New York, where Jonah visits Marion and sleeps with her ("How the Heart Approaches What It Yearns"). Soon after, they get into another argument, waking Matty from his sleep. They immediately stop and put him back to bed.

Jonah takes a few days off ("Oh, Marion") before seeing his agent Bernie, who has secured him a solo slot at a 1960s retrospective show lined up. Jonah is uneasy about appearing without his band but performs anyway ("Soft Parachutes"). At a party afterwards, he insults Cal and Walter asks Lonnie to escort him out. They hit it off and she takes him back to her hotel room.

Jonah spends more time with Matty ("That's Why God Made the Movies"), and meets again with Walter, who introduces him to Steve, a young producer. Jonah is not convinced of Steve's merit, but agrees to a trial recording session. When Jonah and Lonnie are next together, Jonah figures out that Lonnie convinced Walter to give him another chance with the new album. At the recording session, while cutting "Ace in the Hole", Jonah is frustrated by Steve's suggestions to make it more commercially appealing. With the tension between the band members peaking, Jonah refuses Steve's input, leaves the session, and goes home, saddened ("Long, Long Day").

After, he visits Marion at her apartment again. They talk happily about Matty, but Jonah's spirits remain low. He confesses that he thinks the band is broken up and the album is not going to be made. Marion is surprised by the seemingly sudden change but immediately comforts Jonah when he hugs her and begins to cry. The two tenderly recall the earlier days of their relationship. They leave the room, still in their embrace, and Jonah sings Are You Lonesome Tonight? by Elvis Presley.

Jonah returns to the recording studio once more ("Jonah"). He discreetly packs the master tape in his guitar case, takes it out to the street and throws it in the road, destroying the album permanently.

== Cast ==
=== Actors ===
- Paul Simon as Jonah Levin
- Blair Brown as Marion Levin
- Rip Torn as Walter Fox
- Joan Hackett as Lonnie Fox
- Allen Garfield as Cal van Damp
- Mare Winningham as Modeena Dandridge
- Michael Pearlman as Matty Levin
- Lou Reed as Steve Kunelian
- Steve Gadd as Danny Duggin
- Eric Gale as Lee-Andrew Parker
- Tony Levin as John Dibatista
- Richard Tee as Clarence Franklin
- Harry Shearer as Bernie Wepner
- Daniel Stern as Hare Krishna

=== Musicians ===
- Sam & Dave
- The Lovin' Spoonful
- Tiny Tim
- The B-52's
- David Sanborn

== Production ==
The title derives from a colloquial American expression meaning a person specializing in only one area, having only one talent, or of limited ability.

The film is not considered autobiographical, though the story uses some of Simon's experiences in the music business. There has been some disagreement on the story's underpinning. Biographer Laura Jackson felt the film may have been based on experiences in Simon's professional and personal life, though Dave Marsh in a Rolling Stone review saw similarities with Simon's personality, but not with his life and career. However, the character of Walter Fox, the record company executive portrayed by Rip Torn, is regarded as reflecting some of Simon's experiences in moving away from CBS Records, his former label, in the 1970s. (Simon went to Warner Bros. Records at the time of the film's release. The label, at the time owned by the film's distributor, acquired the masters of Simon's CBS catalog that same year.) The film featured one of the last appearances of the original members of The Lovin' Spoonful, in a simulated TV show appearance.

The Paul Simon album One-Trick Pony was released concurrently with the movie. All of the songs on the album are featured in the film, though some have a slightly different mix, such as "Jonah", which features a harmonica solo (probably by Toots Thielemans) that is missing from the album version. The film also features "Soft Parachutes", Jonah Levin's sole hit as a recording artist, which is included as a bonus track on the album's 2004 reissue.

== Reception ==
Reviews for the film were mixed. Writing in the New York Times, critic Janet Maslin called the movie "an odd mixture of inordinately graceful touches and sweeping, clumsy ones". Stephen Holden in Rolling Stone called it "a morose little art film". However, critic Roger Ebert praised the film as "a wonderful movie, an affectionate character study with a lot of good music in it". The film was commercially unsuccessful, grossing less than $900,000 despite a budget of $8 million.
