= Gone at Last =

Single by Paul Simon and Phoebe Snow

from the album Still Crazy After All These Years
- B-side: "Take Me to the Mardi Gras"
- Released: August 1975
- Genre: Gospel
- Length: 3:40
- Label: Columbia
- Songwriter(s): Paul Simon
- Producer(s): Paul Simon; Phil Ramone

Paul Simon singles chronology
"The Sound of Silence (Live)" (1974)	"Gone at Last" (1975)	"50 Ways to Leave Your Lover" (1975)

Phoebe Snow singles chronology
"Harpo's Blues" (1975)	"Gone at Last" (1975)	"All Over" (1975)

"Gone at Last" is a song by the American singer-songwriter Paul Simon. It was the lead single from his fourth studio album, Still Crazy After All These Years (1975), released on Columbia Records. Phoebe Snow and the Jessy Dixon Singers provide guest vocals, with Snow receiving credit on the single release.

== Reception ==
Billboard described "Gone at Last" as "a combination of rock and roll and old time revival gospel."

== Personnel ==
- Paul Simon, Phoebe Snow – duet vocals
- Richard Tee – piano, possible Hammond organ
- Gordon Edwards – bass guitar
- Grady Tate – drums
- Ralph MacDonald – tambourine, shaker
- The Jessy Dixon Singers – background vocals

== Charts ==
Chart (1975)	Peak position
Australia (Kent)	95
Canada (RPM)	29
Canada Pop Music Playlist (RPM)	7
US Easy Listening (Billboard)	9
US Billboard Hot 100	23

== Notes ==
=== Sources ===
- Bennighof, James (2007). The Words and Music of Paul Simon. Greenwood Publishing Group. ISBN 978-0-275-99163-0.
- Eliot, Marc (2010). Paul Simon: A Life. John Wiley and Sons. ISBN 978-0-470-43363-8.
