= Slip Slidin' Away =

1977 song performed by Paul Simon

Single by Paul Simon

from the album Greatest Hits, Etc.
- B-side: "Something So Right"
- Released: October 1977
- Genre: Soft rock
- Length: 4:43
- Label: Columbia
- Songwriter: Paul Simon
- Producers: Paul Simon, Phil Ramone

Paul Simon singles chronology
"Still Crazy After All These Years" / "I Do It For Your Love" (1976)	"Slip Slidin' Away" / "Something So Right" (1977)	"Stranded in a Limousine" / "Have a Good Time" (1978)

"Slip Slidin' Away" is a 1977 song written and recorded by Paul Simon which appears on his compilation album Greatest Hits, Etc. It was one of two new songs to appear on the album, the other being "Stranded in a Limousine". Backing vocals on the song are provided by the Oak Ridge Boys. Simon wrote the song during the sessions for Still Crazy After All These Years but wanted a "more bouncy, upbeat arrangement" than would have fit with the more jazzy sound of that album.

A demo version appears on the 2004 re-issue of the album. The song was also included on Negotiations and Love Songs (1988).

Billboard found the melody to be "catchy" and the lyrics to be "sensitive, thoughtful, melancholic and evocative". Cash Box said that "the emotionally complex lyric works around the title, which serves as the song's memorable chorus line." Record World said that it "shows [Simon's] perception of adult problems and relationships to be undimmed". Music critic Robert Hilburn described it as "an especially appealing work about the uncertainty of relationships."

"Slip Slidin' Away" was released as a single in October 1977 and became a major hit, peaking at No. 5 on the Billboard Pop Singles chart. The song was regularly performed at both Simon's solo concerts and Simon & Garfunkel concerts.

== Personnel ==
- Paul Simon – vocals, acoustic guitar
- Richard Tee – Fender Rhodes
- Anthony Jackson – bass guitar
- Steve Gadd – drums
- Ralph MacDonald – temple blocks, triangle, tambourine, shakers
- The Oak Ridge Boys – backing vocals

== Chart performance ==
=== Weekly charts ===
Chart (1977–1978)	Peak position
Australia (KMR)	35
Canada (RPM) Top Singles	3
Canada Adult Oriented Playlist (RPM)	23
France (SNEP)	15
Israel (IBA)	8
UK Singles (Official Charts Company)	36
US Easy Listening (Billboard)	4
US Billboard Hot 100	5

=== Year-end charts ===
Chart (1977)	Rank
Canada (RPM)	186

Chart (1978)	Rank
US Billboard Hot 100	48

== Certifications ==
Region	Certification	Certified units/sales
New Zealand (RMNZ)	Gold	15,000^{‡}
United States (RIAA)	Gold	500,000^{^}
^{^} Shipments figures based on certification alone.^{‡} Sales+streaming figures based on certification alone.
