= One-Trick Pony (album) =

Soundtrack album / studio album by Paul Simon
- Released: August 12, 1980
- Recorded: 1979–1980
- Studios: A&R Studios, New York except "Ace in the Hole" and "One-Trick Pony" recorded live at the Agora Club, Cleveland, Ohio
- Genre: Rock
- Length: 38:25
- Label: Warner Bros.
- Producers: Paul Simon, Phil Ramone

Paul Simon chronology
Greatest Hits, Etc. (1977)	One-Trick Pony (1980)	Hearts and Bones (1983)

Singles from One-Trick Pony
- 1. "Late in the Evening" Released: July 1980; 2. "One-Trick Pony" Released: October 1980; 3. "Oh, Marion" Released: February 1981

Professional ratings
Review scores
Source	Rating
AllMusic	3/5 stars
Robert Christgau	B−
Rolling Stone	(mixed)

One-Trick Pony is the fifth solo studio album by Paul Simon released in 1980. It was Simon's first album for Warner Bros. Records, and his first new studio album since 1975's Still Crazy After All These Years. His back catalog from Columbia Records also moved to Warner Bros. as a result of his signing with the label.

== Background ==
Paul Simon's One-Trick Pony was released concurrently with the film of the same name, in which Simon also starred. Despite their similarities, the album and film are musically distinct: each features different versions of the same songs as well as certain songs that appear exclusively on either the film or the album. The album is best known for the Grammy-nominated track "Late in the Evening" which was a hit for Simon in 1980, peaking at No. 6 in the United States. The title track was also released as a single and became a U.S. Top 40 hit. Both songs were also Top 20 hits on the U.S. Adult Contemporary chart. Two of the tracks (the title song and "Ace in the Hole") were recorded live at the Agora Theatre and Ballroom in Cleveland, Ohio, in September 1979, while the rest are studio cuts.

Several session musicians appearing on the album also appeared in the movie as the character Jonah's backing band: guitarist Eric Gale, pianist Richard Tee, bassist Tony Levin, and drummer Steve Gadd. Simon toured Europe and America in 1980 with this band in support of the album, with one concert from Philadelphia recorded on video and released on VHS under the title "Paul Simon in Concert", then subsequently on DVD under 2 different titles for the same concert footage ("Live at the Tower Theatre" and "Live from Philadelphia").

In 2004, One-Trick Pony was remastered and re-released by Warner Bros. Records. This reissue contains four bonus tracks, including "Soft Parachutes" and "Spiral Highway" (an early version of "How the Heart Approaches What It Yearns"), both of which were featured in the film but were missing from the original album release. Also included in the re-release were the outtakes of "All Because of You" (an early version of "Oh, Marion" that would also spawn "God Bless the Absentee") and "Stranded in a Limousine", which originally appeared on the 1977 compilation Greatest Hits, Etc..

== Commercial performance ==
The album yielded two hit singles: "Late in the Evening" (US #6, AC #7) and "One-Trick Pony" (US #40, AC #17).

Billboard said of "One Trick Pony" that "The mellow jazz flavored arrangement features superb guitar, keyboard and percussive support while Simon delivers a convincing vocal performance." Record World said that "Simon sings about the fate of an aging rocker while Eric Gale's lyrical guitar adds emphasis on this superb title cut." Record World also praised the song's hook.

"Oh, Marion" didn't chart but Record World called it a "masterpiece" and said that this "pretty ballad is filled with memorable lyrical passages and instrumental subtleties."

== Track listing ==
All tracks are written by Paul Simon.

Side one
No.	Title	Length
1.	"Late in the Evening"	4:02
2.	"That's Why God Made the Movies"	3:37
3.	"One-Trick Pony" (live at the Agora Theatre and Ballroom, Cleveland, Ohio, September 1979)	3:53
4.	"How the Heart Approaches What It Yearns"	2:49
5.	"Oh, Marion"	4:00
Total length:		18:21

Side two
No.	Title	Length
6.	"Ace in the Hole" (duet with Richard Tee) (live at the Agora Theatre and Ballroom, Cleveland, Ohio, September 1979)	5:43
7.	"Nobody"	3:32
8.	"Jonah"	3:30
9.	"God Bless the Absentee"	3:17
10.	"Long, Long Day" (with Patti Austin)	3:57
Total length:		19:59 38:20

2004 re-release additions
No.	Title	Length
11.	"Soft Parachutes"	1:53
12.	"All Because of You"	4:06
13.	"Spiral Highway"	2:56
14.	"Stranded in a Limousine"	3:10
Total length:		12:05 50:25

== Personnel ==
- Paul Simon – lead vocals (all tracks), backing vocals (1, 5–7, 10), nylon string guitar (2, 4, 8), electric guitar (3, 6), percussion (8), string and horn arrangements (4, 8)
- Richard Tee – co-lead vocals (6), backing vocals (3, 6), Fender Rhodes electric piano (all but 1 and 9), piano (9), tambourine (6)
- Don Grolnick – synthesizer (2)
- Eric Gale – electric guitar (1, 3–4, 6–7, 9), nylon string guitar (4)
- Hugh McCracken – acoustic guitar (1–2, 7, 9–10), slide guitar (2)
- Hiram Bullock – electric guitar (2)
- Jeff Mironov – electric guitar (5)
- John Tropea – acoustic guitar (8)
- Joe Beck – electric guitar (10)
- Tony Levin – backing vocals (6), bass guitar (all but 5)
- Anthony Jackson – bass guitar (5)
- Steve Gadd – drums (all tracks)
- Ralph MacDonald – percussion (1–2, 8)
- Jon Faddis – flugelhorn (5)
- Patti Austin – co-lead and backing vocals (10)
- Lani Groves – backing vocals (10)
- Dave Grusin – horn arrangements (1, 9), string arrangement (9)
- Bob Friedman – string and horn arrangements (10)

Technical

- Paul Simon, Phil Ramone – producers
- Jim Boyer – recording engineer, mixing engineer
- Ted Jensen – mastering engineer

== Charts ==
=== Weekly charts ===
Chart (1980)	Peak position
Australia (Kent Music Report)	15
Canadian Albums (RPM)	23
Dutch Mega Albums (MegaCharts)	8
French Albums (SNEP)	11
Japanese LPs (Oricon)	35
New Zealand Albums (RIANZ)	6
Norwegian Albums (VG-lista)	2
Spanish Albums (Promusicae)	15
Swedish Albums (Sverigetopplistan)	9
UK Albums	17
US Billboard Top LPs	12

=== Year-end charts ===
Chart (1980)	Position
Australian Albums	66
French Albums	89

== Certifications ==
Region	Certification	Certified units/sales
United Kingdom (BPI)	Silver	60,000^{^}
United States (RIAA)	Gold	500,000^{^}
^{^} Shipments figures based on certification alone.

== Accolades ==
=== Grammy Awards ===
Year	Nominee / work	Award	Result
1981	"Late in the Evening"	Best Pop Vocal Performance – Male	Nominated

== Cover versions ==
- The String Cheese Incident have covered the song "Late In the Evening" on numerous occasions, with drummer Michael Travis on vocals.
- Peter Mulvey covered "Stranded In a Limousine" on his album Ten Thousand Mornings.

== In popular culture ==
- The album is mentioned on the thank you page of Douglas Adams' novel The Restaurant at the End of the Universe.
- The Victoria, B.C. band Immaculate Machine takes their name from the lyrics of the track "One-Trick Pony".
