= 50 Ways to Leave Your Lover =

Single by Paul Simon

from the album Still Crazy After All These Years
- B-side: "Some Folks' Lives Roll Easy"
- Released: 20 December 1975
- Studio: A&R Recording, New York City
- Length: 3:35
- Label: Columbia
- Songwriter: Paul Simon
- Producers: Paul Simon; Phil Ramone

Paul Simon singles chronology
"Gone at Last" (1975)	"50 Ways to Leave Your Lover" (1975)	"Still Crazy After All These Years" (1976)

"50 Ways to Leave Your Lover" is a song by the American singer-songwriter Paul Simon. It was the second single from his fourth studio album, Still Crazy After All These Years (1975), released on Columbia Records. Backing vocals on the single were performed by Patti Austin, Valerie Simpson, and Phoebe Snow. The song features a recognizable repeated drum riff performed by drummer Steve Gadd.

One of his most popular singles, "50 Ways" was released in December 1975 and began to see chart success in the new year. It became Simon's sole number-one hit as a solo artist on the Billboard Hot 100 in the United States and was his highest-charting song in France, where it peaked at number two. Elsewhere, the song was a top 20 hit in Canada and New Zealand. The single was certified gold by the Recording Industry Association of America (RIAA), denoting sales of more than one million copies.

An edit of the song that cuts out a few seconds of the intro is included on The Paul Simon Collection: On My Way, Don't Know Where I'm Goin'.

== Background ==
Following his divorce from his first wife Peggy Harper, Simon opted to take a more humorous approach to document the event. He recorded the song at A&R Recording on 48th Street in New York City, a small studio "in the heart of Broadway's theater district", and built the song around percussion—"martial drums" in particular—in order to "avoid clutter". Simon described the song as "just a fluke hit that I slipped into by accident".

In 2023, Simon appeared on The Howard Stern Show and stated that he wrote the chorus lyrics while teaching his son Harper how to rhyme.

Steve Gadd recalled that the drumbeat for "50 Ways to Leave Your Lover" was originally uniform across the verses and choruses, although at A&R Recording, both Simon and Phil Ramone asked Gadd to rework the verses with a different groove. In between takes, Gadd was quietly practicing drum patterns by placing particular emphasis on the hi-hat cymbal. Ramone overheard him practicing and asked him to incorporate these ideas into the verses, which was ultimately retained in the final mix.

It has been jokingly pointed out that although the song's title is "50 Ways to Leave Your Lover", the lyics reference only five unique methods.

== Critical reception ==
Contemporary reviews of "50 Ways to Leave Your Lover" were positive, with Billboard calling it an "excellent song" that has "very clever lyrics" and an "easy to listen to melody". Cash Box said that it is "a clever, commercial song about the elasticity of love, how easy it is to pull away and equally easy to snap back with it." Record World said that the song "finds Simon aided by a crack team of session men and the unmistakable vocals of Phoebe Snow".

Entertainment Weekly thought that Simon "reached a conversational, graceful peak on '50 Ways to Leave Your Lover'". Spin was more critical of the song and listed it as one of the "50 Worst Songs By Otherwise Great Artists".

== Personnel ==
Credits adapted from the liner notes of Still Crazy After All These Years.

- Paul Simon – lead vocals, acoustic guitar
- John Tropea – electric guitar
- Hugh McCracken – electric guitar
- Tony Levin – bass guitar
- Kenny Ascher – Hammond organ
- Steve Gadd – drums
- Ralph MacDonald – tambourine, shaker
- Patti Austin – background vocals
- Valerie Simpson – background vocals
- Phoebe Snow – background vocals

== Charts and certifications ==
"50 Ways to Leave Your Lover" was Paul Simon's biggest solo hit and broke in the US in late 1975. It entered the US Billboard Hot 100 on December 20, 1975 at number 74 and peaked at number one on February 7, 1976. The song remained at the summit for three weeks and became his only number one on that chart as a solo act. It also topped the adult contemporary chart for two weeks. Overseas, on the UK Singles Chart, the song reached number 23 in January 1976. It was certified gold on March 11, 1976, and remained a best seller for nearly five months. Billboard ranked it as the No. 8 song of 1976.

=== Weekly charts ===
Chart (1975–1976)	Peak position
Australia (Kent Music Report)	35
Canada (RPM) Top Singles	7
Canada Pop Music Playlist (RPM)	1
France (SNEP)	2
Israel (IBA)	35
New Zealand (Recorded Music NZ)	18
UK Singles (Official Charts Company)	23
US Easy Listening (Billboard)	1
US Billboard Hot 100	1
West Germany (GfK)	42

=== Year-end charts ===
Chart (1976)	Rank
Canada 100 (RPM)	91
US Billboard Hot 100	8
US Billboard Easy Listening	3

=== Certifications ===
Region	Certification	Certified units/sales
New Zealand (RMNZ)	Platinum	30,000^{‡}
United Kingdom (BPI)	Gold	400,000^{‡}
United States (RIAA)	Gold	1,000,000^{^}
^{^} Shipments figures based on certification alone.^{‡} Sales+streaming figures based on certification alone.

== See also ==
- Hot 100 number-one hits of 1976
