= Still Crazy After All These Years (song) =

Single by Paul Simon

from the album Still Crazy After All These Years
- B-side: "I Do It For Your Love" (US); "Silent Eyes" (Europe)
- Released: March 26, 1976
- Genre: Soft rock
- Length: 3:24
- Label: Columbia
- Songwriter: Paul Simon
- Producers: Paul Simon; Phil Ramone

Paul Simon singles chronology
"50 Ways to Leave Your Lover" (1975)	"Still Crazy After All These Years" (1976)	"Slip Slidin' Away" (1977)

Official audio
- "Still Crazy After All These Years" on YouTube

"Still Crazy After All These Years" is a song by the American singer-songwriter Paul Simon. It was the third and final single from his fourth studio album of the same name (1975), released on Columbia Records. Though the song briefly reached the top 40 of the Billboard Hot 100 in the US, it was a bigger hit on the magazine's Easy Listening chart, where it peaked at number four.

== Composition ==
"Still Crazy After All These Years" begins with the singer singing that "I met my old lover on the street last night." The "old lover" has been variously interpreted to be either Simon's ex-wife Peggy Harper, from whom he was recently divorced, his former girlfriend from the 1960s, Kathy Chitty, or even Simon's former musical partner Art Garfunkel, who appears on the following track, "My Little Town". After sharing a few beers, the singer and the old lover part ways again. The singer notes that he is "not the kind of man who tends to socialize" but rather leans "on old familiar ways" and is "still crazy after all these years". The lyrics acknowledge a nostalgia for the past, but also subtly suggest that once the sweet nostalgia is gone, it is replaced by loneliness and even bitterness.

The song features the Muscle Shoals Rhythm Section: Barry Beckett (Rhodes piano), David Hood (bass guitar) and Roger Hawkins (drums), arranged by Bob James. The saxophone, played by Michael Brecker, emphasizes the jazz character of the song. Music theorist Peter Kaminsky analyzed how the key progression of the introduction to "Still Crazy After All These Years" anticipates the key progressions throughout the album. The song has an AABA form, with the first, second and fourth verses sharing the same basic melody. The first and second verses are primarily in the key of G major, although there are some unexpected harmonies that differ between the verses. The key of the third verse, the B section, is never resolved. G major returns in the final verse, but modulates to the slightly higher key of A major, which according to author James Bennighof gives "a faint sense of slightly demented triumph to the singer's declaration that he wouldn't be held responsible for his potential mayhem." Music critic Walter Everett considers this modulation to reflect the singer's "unpredictable emotional and mental state".

== Reception ==
Rolling Stone critic Paul Nelson considered "Still Crazy After All These Years" to be the best song on the album. He praises the "poignancy and openness" of the first verse and Brecker's passionate sax solo, and the fact that the song demonstrates "the fierceness of [Simon's] will". Billboard described the song as "a superb ballad with excellent lyrics and excellent instrumentation". Cash Box called the song "a moving, tender ballad" with "flawless" production and a "perfectly constructed" melody. Record World said that the style "is warm and reflective in a way that anyone can latch onto".

Simon has performed the song three times on the late-night comedy series Saturday Night Live. He first performed the song on October 18, 1975 during the show's first season. Simon performed the song a second time during the show's second season, airing just before Thanksgiving in 1976; Simon comically wore a turkey costume and stopped halfway through the track to complain about the outfit to Lorne Michaels. Simon's most recent performance of the song was for the show's Saturday Night Live 40th Anniversary Special in 2015.

== Charts ==
Chart (1976)	Peak position
Canada (RPM) Top Singles	38
Canada MOR Playlist (RPM)	2
US Easy Listening (Billboard)	5
US Billboard Hot 100	40

== Personnel ==
- Paul Simon – vocals
- Barry Beckett – Fender Rhodes
- Bob James – woodwind arrangement, string arrangement
- David Hood – bass
- Roger Hawkins – drums
- Michael Brecker – tenor sax solo

== Other versions ==
In 1979 Paul Simon suggested to Karen Carpenter that she should include a version of the song on her solo album, then in preparation which was also being produced by Phil Ramone. She changed the words 'crapped out' to 'crashed out'. This album was released posthumously in 1996.

== Notes ==
=== Sources ===
- Bennighof, James (2007). The Words and Music of Paul Simon. Greenwood Publishing Group. ISBN 978-0-275-99163-0.
- Eliot, Marc (2010). Paul Simon: A Life. John Wiley and Sons. ISBN 978-0-470-43363-8.
