= Something So Right (song) =

Original song written, composed, and performed by Paul Simon

Song by Paul Simon

from the album There Goes Rhymin' Simon
- Released: May 5, 1973
- Recorded: 1972: Columbia Studios, New York City
- Genre: Pop rock
- Length: 4:33
- Label: Columbia
- Songwriter: Paul Simon
- Producers: Paul Simon; Phil Ramone

"Something So Right" is a song by the American singer-songwriter Paul Simon. It is the fourth song on his third studio album, There Goes Rhymin' Simon (1973). Although it was not a single, it was released as a B-side of a number of singles, including "Take Me to the Mardi Gras" and "Slip Slidin' Away". The song has been covered by numerous artists, most notably by Scottish singer Annie Lennox, whose 1995 duet with Simon placed at number 44 on the UK Singles Chart.

== Personnel ==
Credits adapted from the liner notes of There Goes Rhymin' Simon.

- Paul Simon – vocals, guitar, songwriting, production
- David Spinozza – guitar
- Al Gafa – guitar
- Richard Davis – acoustic bass
- Bob Cranshaw – electric bass
- Grady Tate – drums
- Bob James – Fender Rhodes
- Bobby Scott – piano
- Don Elliott – vibraphone
- Quincy Jones – string arrangement
- Phil Ramone – audio engineer
- A flute is audible on the track, but the player is uncredited.

== Charts ==
Paul Simon version

Chart (1973)	Peak position
Australia (Go-Set)	10

== Annie Lennox version ==
"Something So Right"

Single by Annie Lennox featuring Paul Simon

from the album Medusa
- Released: November 1995
- Studio: The Aquarium (London)
- Genre: Pop; soul
- Length: 3:56
- Label: RCA
- Songwriter: Paul Simon
- Producer: Stephen Lipson

Annie Lennox singles chronology
"Waiting in Vain" (1995)	"Something So Right" (1995)	"Into the West" (2003)

Music video
- "Something So Right" on YouTube

In 1995, "Something So Right" was recorded by Scottish singer Annie Lennox for her second solo album, Medusa (1995). Later that year, she re-recorded the track with Paul Simon, who features as an acoustic guitarist on the track and sings a harmony vocal partway through the song. This re-recorded version was released as a single by RCA Records, reaching no. 44 on the UK charts.

=== Critical reception ===
Pan-European magazine Music & Media wrote, "This Paul Simon song from Lennox' cover album Medusa has the additional vocals and guitar parts of Mr. Simon himself. It starts out as a beautiful, simple ballad, but as the song progresses, gospel influences and more elaborate orchestrations pop up. Another great seasonal single."

=== Track listing ===
==== CD maxi-single ====
No.	Title	Length
1.	"Something So Right"	3:50
2.	"Waiting In Vain" (Recorded Live for Radio 1)	3:39
3.	"Something So Right" (Recorded Live for Radio 1)	3:40
4.	"Money Can't Buy It" (Recorded Live in New York)	4:49

==== CD single ====
No.	Title	Length
1.	"Something So Right"	3:50
2.	"Sweet Dreams (Are Made of This)" (Recorded Live in New York)	3:28

=== Charts ===
Chart (1995)	Peak position
Europe (European Hit Radio)	32
UK Singles (Official Charts)	44
UK Airplay (Music Week)	50
