= Paul Simon =

American singer-songwriter (born 1941)

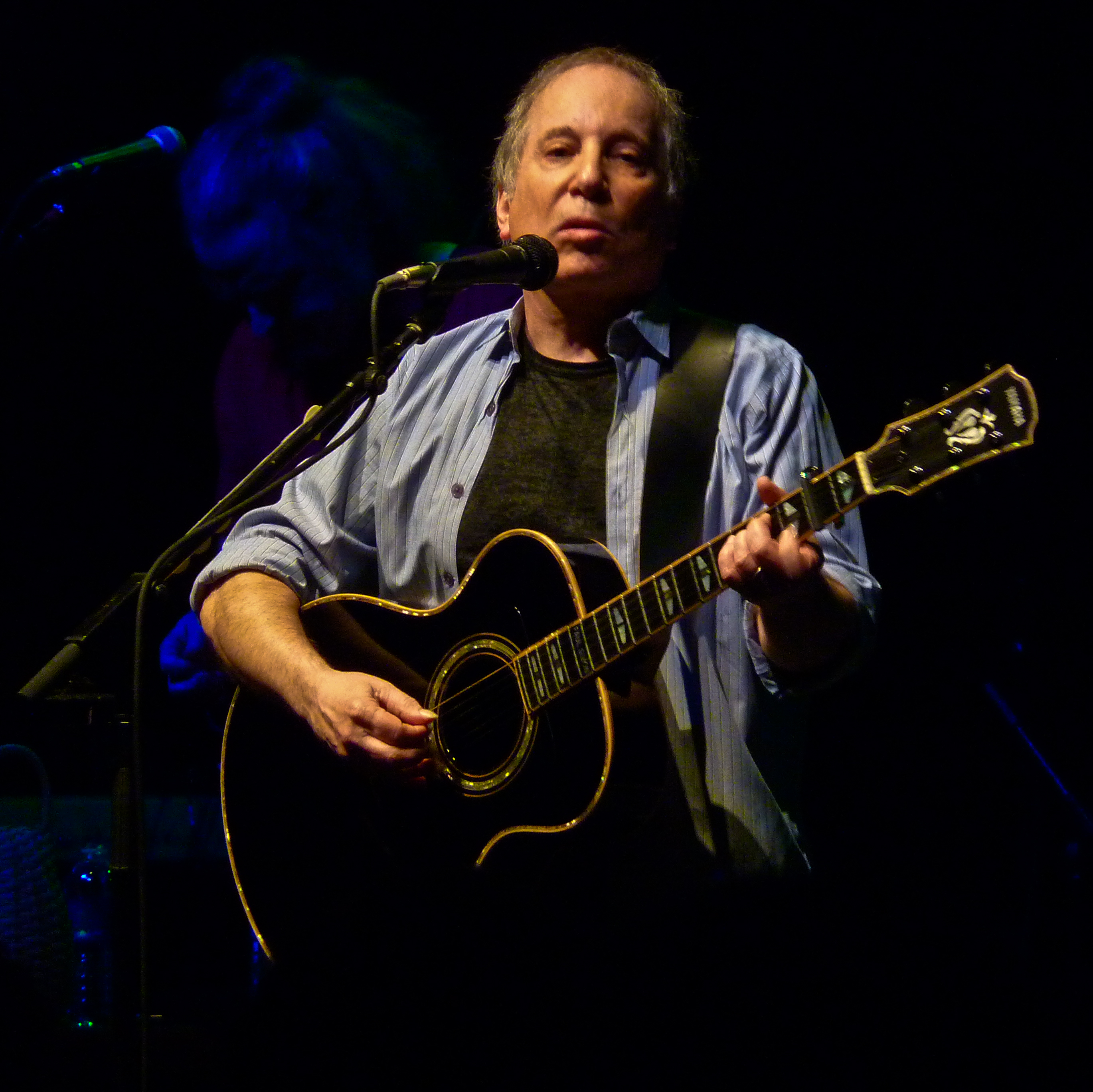
- Simon in 2011

Background information
- Born: Paul Frederic Simon; October 13, 1941 (age 85); Newark, New Jersey, U.S.
- Origin: New York City, U.S.
- Genres: Folk; rock; pop; world
- Occupations: Musician; singer; songwriter; actor
- Instruments: Vocals; guitar
- Years active: 1956–present
- Labels: Columbia; Warner Bros.; Concord
- Formerly of: Simon & Garfunkel
- Spouses: Peggy Harper (m. 1969; div. 1975) Carrie Fisher (m. 1983; div. 1984) Edie Brickell (m. 1992)
- Partner: Shelley Duvall (1976–1978)
- Website: paulsimon.com

Paul Frederic Simon (born October 13, 1941) is an American singer-songwriter and guitarist, known for his solo work and his collaborations with Art Garfunkel. He and Garfunkel, whom he met in elementary school in 1953, came to prominence in the 1960s as Simon & Garfunkel. Their blend of folk and rock, including hits such as "The Sound of Silence" (1965), "Mrs. Robinson" (1968), "America" (1968), and "The Boxer" (1969), served as a soundtrack to the 1960s counterculture. Their final album, Bridge over Troubled Water (1970), is among the best-selling of all time.

As a solo artist, Simon has explored genres including gospel, reggae, and soul. His albums Paul Simon (1972), There Goes Rhymin' Simon (1973), and Still Crazy After All These Years (1975) kept him in the public eye and drew acclaim, producing the hits "Mother and Child Reunion" (1972), "Me and Julio Down by the Schoolyard" (1972), "Kodachrome" (1973), and "50 Ways to Leave Your Lover" (1975). Simon reunited with Garfunkel for several tours and the 1981 Concert in Central Park. Simon has performed on Saturday Night Live several times and hosted it four times from 1975 to 1987. He made his acting debut in Woody Allen's romantic comedy Annie Hall (1977).

In 1986, Simon released his most successful and acclaimed album, Graceland, incorporating South African influences. "You Can Call Me Al" became one of Simon's most successful singles. Graceland was followed by The Rhythm of the Saints (1990) and a second Concert in the Park in 1991, without Garfunkel, which approximately 500,000 people attended. In 1998, Simon wrote a Broadway musical, The Capeman, that was poorly received. He continued to record and tour in the 21st century. His later albums, such as You're the One (2000), So Beautiful or So What (2011), and Stranger to Stranger (2016), introduced him to new generations. His most recent album, Seven Psalms, was released in 2023.

Simon has twice been inducted into the Rock and Roll Hall of Fame and has won 16 Grammy Awards, including three for Album of the Year. Two of his works, Sounds of Silence (1966) (as part of Simon & Garfunkel) and Graceland, were inducted into the National Recording Registry for their cultural significance. He was honored with the Kennedy Center Honors in 2001 and the Library of Congress's Gershwin Prize in 2007. He is a co-founder of the Children's Health Fund, a nonprofit organization that provides medical care to children.

== Early life and education ==
Simon was born on October 13, 1941, in Newark, New Jersey, to Hungarian-Jewish parents. His father, Louis (1916–1995), a professor of education at the City College of New York, was a double bass player and dance bandleader who performed under the name Lee Sims. His mother, Belle (1910–2007), was an elementary-school teacher. In 1945, his family moved to the Kew Gardens Hills section of Flushing, Queens, in New York City.

Steely Dan's Donald Fagen described Simon's childhood as that of "a certain kind of New York Jew, almost a stereotype really, to whom music and baseball are very important. I think it has to do with the parents. The parents are either immigrants or first-generation Americans who felt like outsiders, and assimilation was the key thought—they gravitated to black music and baseball, looking for an alternative culture." Simon said Fagen's description was not far from the truth. He described his father as funny and smart, but said he worked late and did not see his children much. He recalls hearing "Gee" by The Crows on Make Believe Ballroom: "It was really the first thing I heard on there that I liked. And it was really the first time I heard rock and roll." He tried to explain to his father the feeling he got hearing "Earth Angel": "My father was a very good musician. And he comes from an era of very sophisticated music. Big bands, and Sinatra ... He didn't buy it. But I love that record".

Simon met Art Garfunkel when they were 11 years old and performed together in a production of Alice in Wonderland for their sixth-grade graduation. The two began singing together at age 13, occasionally performing at school dances. At age 12 or 13, Simon wrote his first song, "The Girl for Me", for him and Garfunkel to perform. According to Simon, it became the "neighborhood hit". His father wrote the words and chords on paper for the boys to use, and that paper became the first officially copyrighted Simon and Garfunkel song. It is now in the Library of Congress. In 1957, in their mid-teens, they recorded the song "Hey, Schoolgirl" under the name "Tom & Jerry", a name given to them by their label, Big Records. The single reached number 49 on the Billboard charts.

After graduating from Forest Hills High School, Simon majored in English at Queens College and graduated in 1963. Garfunkel studied mathematics education at Columbia University in Manhattan. Simon was a brother in the Alpha Epsilon Pi fraternity and attended Brooklyn Law School for one semester in 1963.

== Career ==
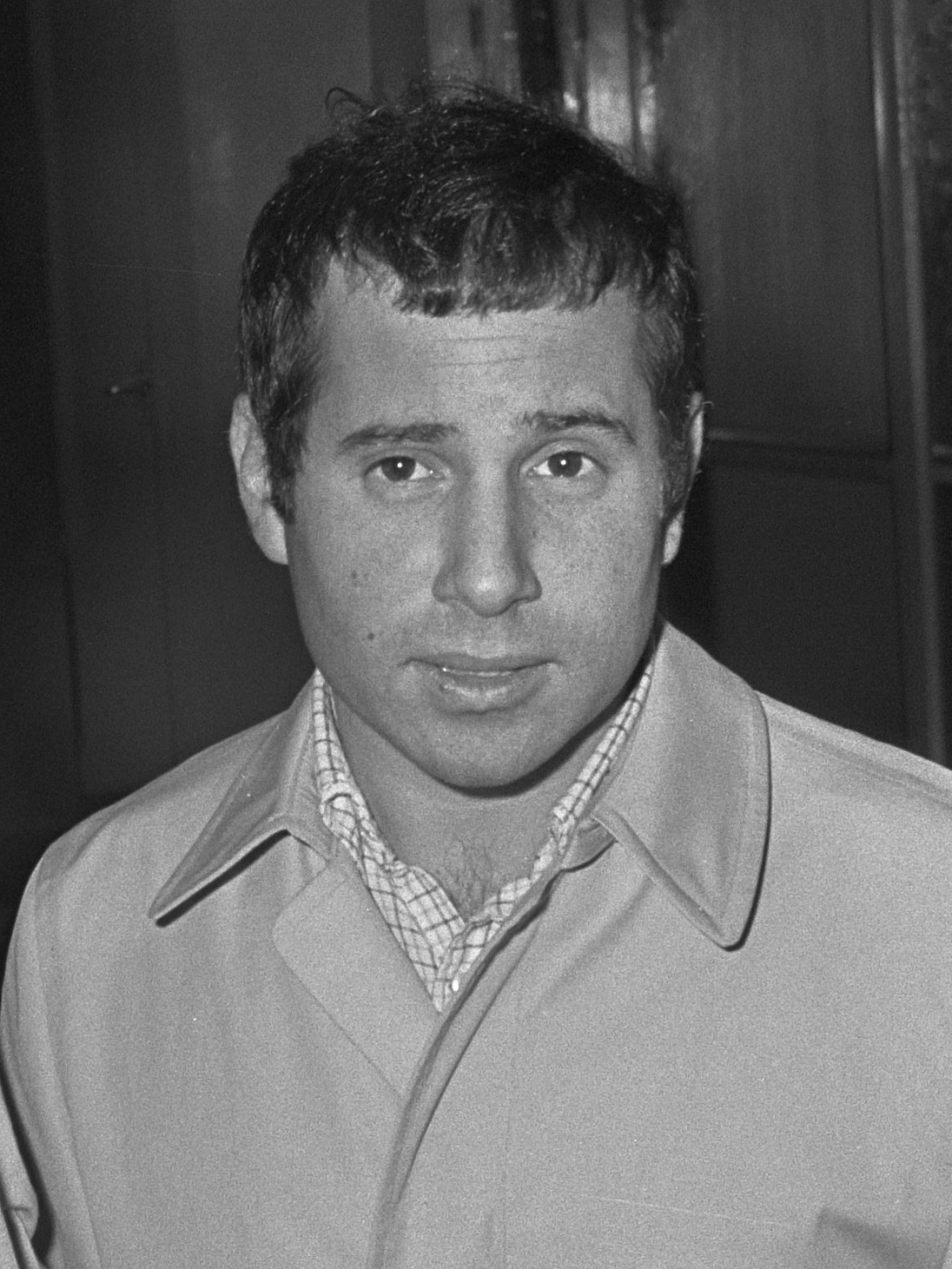
Simon in 1966

Between 1957 and 1964, Simon wrote, recorded, and released more than 30 songs. He and Garfunkel occasionally reunited as Tom & Jerry to record singles, including "Our Song" and "That's My Story". Most of the songs Simon recorded during that time he performed alone or with musicians other than Garfunkel. They were released on minor record labels including Amy, Big, Hunt, King, Tribute and Madison. Simon used several pseudonyms for these recordings, including "Jerry Landis", "Paul Kane", and "True Taylor". By 1962, working as Jerry Landis, he was a frequent writer/producer for several Amy Records artists, overseeing material released by Dotty Daniels, the Vels and Ritchie Cordell. He and Garfunkel were influenced by the harmonies of the Everly Brothers.

Simon enjoyed moderate success with singles as part of the group Tico and the Triumphs, including "Motorcycle", which reached number 99 on the Billboard charts in 1962. Tico and the Triumphs released four 45s. Marty Cooper, known as Tico, sang lead on several of these releases, but "Motorcycle" featured Simon's vocal. Also in 1962, Simon reached number 97 on the pop charts as Jerry Landis, with the novelty song "The Lone Teen Ranger".

=== 1960s: Simon & Garfunkel ===
In early 1964, Simon and Garfunkel auditioned for Columbia Records, whose executive Clive Davis signed them to produce an album. Columbia decided to call them Simon & Garfunkel instead of Tom & Jerry, and according to Simon, this was the first time artists' surnames had been used in pop music without their first names. Simon and Garfunkel's first LP, Wednesday Morning, 3 A.M., was released on October 19, 1964. It consisted of 12 songs, five of which were written by Simon. The album initially flopped.

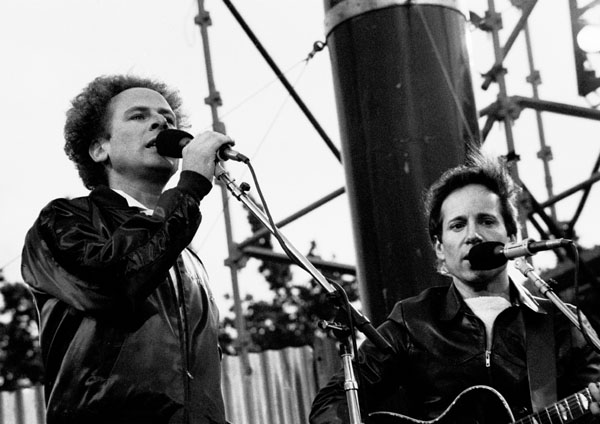
Garfunkel, left, with Paul Simon, right, performing outside at a concert in Dublin as Simon & Garfunkel

In 1965, after the album's release, Simon moved to London and performed in folk clubs. He enjoyed his time in England and said in 1970, "I had a lot of friends there and a girlfriend. I could play music there. There was no place to play in New York City. They wouldn't have me." He was welcomed by England's bohemian folk scene. He recalled, "I learnt how to finger-pick acoustic guitar from Martin Carthy, who was connected to the Watersons from Hull, which of course led to 'Scarborough Fair', and I had never heard anything like those old English songs. The closest I got was the Everly Brothers, who borrowed from Appalachian melodies, so that period was very powerful for me ... I was 21, 22, and emotionally open to everything." He wrote "Homeward Bound" and "I Am a Rock", and learned Davey Graham's guitar instrumental "Anji".

In England, Simon recorded a solo album, The Paul Simon Songbook, featuring just his voice and guitar accompaniment; it was released only in the UK at the time, but later released elsewhere. He also produced Jackson C. Frank's only album and co-wrote several songs with Bruce Woodley of the Australian pop group the Seekers, including "I Wish You Could Be Here", "Cloudy" and "Red Rubber Ball". Simon penned "Someday, One Day" for the Seekers, which charted around the same time as "Homeward Bound".

Radio stations on the American East Coast began receiving requests for the Wednesday Morning, 3 A.M. track "The Sound of Silence". Simon & Garfunkel's producer, Tom Wilson, overdubbed the track with electric guitar, bass guitar, and drums, and it was released as a single, eventually reaching number 1 on the U.S. pop charts. Wilson did not inform the duo of his plan, and Simon was "horrified" when he first heard it. The single's success drew Simon back to the U.S. to reunite with Garfunkel, and they recorded the albums Sounds of Silence (1966), Parsley, Sage, Rosemary and Thyme (1966) and Bookends (1968).

Simon & Garfunkel also contributed to the soundtrack of Mike Nichols's film The Graduate (1967). While writing "Mrs. Robinson", Simon toyed with the title "Mrs. Roosevelt". When Garfunkel reported this indecision over the song's name to the director, Nichols replied, "Don't be ridiculous! We're making a movie here! It's Mrs. Robinson!"

Simon and Garfunkel's relationship became strained and they split in 1970. At the urging of his wife, Peggy Harper, Simon called Davis to confirm the duo's breakup. For the next several years, they spoke only two or three times a year. Their last album, Bridge over Troubled Water (1970), was the bestselling album to date. The title track was inspired by a line from the Swan Silvertones version of "Mary Don't You Weep". The title track reached number one, and "Cecilia" and "The Boxer" made the top ten.

=== 1970–1976: Solo and Still Crazy After All These Years ===
In 1970, Simon taught songwriting at New York University. He said he had wanted to teach for a while, and hoped to help people avoid some of the mistakes he had made: "You can teach somebody about writing songs. You can't teach someone how to write a song ... I'd go to a course if the Beatles would talk about how they made records because I'm sure I could learn something." He contributed the lyrics of "Half of the People" to Leonard Bernstein's Mass (1971).

Simon pursued solo work while occasionally reuniting with Garfunkel for various projects. In April 1972, he performed at the Cleveland Arena alongside Joni Mitchell and James Taylor in a benefit concert for George McGovern's 1972 presidential campaign. He and Garfunkel reunited in mid-June that year at Madison Square Garden in another concert for McGovern.

Simon's next album, Paul Simon, was released in January 1972. It featured an early experiment with world music, the reggae-inspired "Mother and Child Reunion", recorded with Jimmy Cliff's band. It reached both the American and British Top 5. The album received universal acclaim and critics praised its variety of styles and confessional lyrics. Paul Simon reached number 4 in the U.S. and number 1 in the UK and Japan, and produced another Top 30 hit, "Me and Julio Down by the Schoolyard". Simon also provided guitar on Garfunkel's 1973 album Angel Clare, and added backing vocals to the song "Down in the Willow Garden".

Simon's next project, the pop-folk album There Goes Rhymin' Simon, was released in May 1973. The lead single, "Kodachrome", was a number 2 hit in the U.S. The follow-up, the gospel-flavored "Loves Me Like a Rock", topped the Cashbox charts. Other songs like "American Tune" and "Something So Right" (a tribute to Simon's first wife, Peggy) became part of his repertoire. The album reached number 1 on the Cashbox album charts. In March 1974 he released a live album, Live Rhymin', containing elements of Latin and religious music.

His next album, produced by Simon and Phil Ramone, was Still Crazy After All These Years, released in October 1975. The mood of the album, written after Simon's divorce, was darker. It contains "Gone at Last", a duet with Phoebe Snow, and the Simon & Garfunkel reunion track "My Little Town" (a number 9 on Billboard). Simon wrote the song for Garfunkel, whose solo output Simon felt lacked "bite", and it was included on Garfunkel's album Breakaway. Contrary to popular belief, the song was not based on Simon's early life in New York City. The album is his only number 1 on the Billboard charts to date. The 18th Grammy Awards named it the Album of the Year, and his performance on it the year's Best Male Pop Vocal. The third single from the album, "50 Ways to Leave Your Lover", reached the top spot on the Billboard charts. On May 3, 1976, Simon put together a benefit show at Madison Square Garden for the New York Public Library that raised over $30,000.

=== 1977–1985: One-Trick Pony and Hearts and Bones ===
After releasing three successful studio albums, Simon worked on various projects. He wrote music for Hal Ashby's Shampoo (1975). "Slip Slidin' Away", the lead single of his 1977 compilation Greatest Hits, Etc., reached number 5 in the U.S. Simon has also had several acting roles in films and television shows. He played music producer Tony Lacey, a supporting character in Woody Allen's film Annie Hall (1977) and made a cameo appearance in the movie The Rutles: All You Need Is Cash the following year. In 1981 he appeared in an episode of The Muppet Show, the only episode of the series to use the songs of one songwriter. He appeared in several episodes of Sesame Street in the 1970s and 1980s, including in a memorable performance of "Me and Julio Down by the Schoolyard" in 1977, and a cameo appearance in the song "Put Down the Duckie!" in 1986.

In 1980, Simon released One-Trick Pony, his first album with Warner Bros. Records and his first in almost five years. The album was paired with the motion picture of the same name, which Simon wrote and starred in. The single "Late in the Evening" reached number 6 on Billboard, but the album did not sell well. In 1981, Simon & Garfunkel included eight songs from Simon's solo career in the set list of their September 19 concert in Central Park. Five were rearranged as duets and Simon performed the other three solo. The resulting live album, TV special, and videocassette (later DVD) releases were all major hits.

After the success of The Concert in Central Park, Simon & Garfunkel returned to the studio, planning to record an album of new material. This would have been their first new recordings as a duo since their "My Little Town" and their first album of new material since Bridge over Troubled Water. Simon ultimately decided to wipe Garfunkel's vocals from the mix, and in 1983, he released Hearts and Bones as a solo album. It is a polished, confessional album that was eventually viewed as one of his best works, but it achieved the lowest sales of his career. Hearts and Bones included "The Late Great Johnny Ace", a song about the deaths of American R&B singer Johnny Ace and John Lennon. It featured an orchestral coda by Philip Glass. In January 1985, Simon performed for USA for Africa and on the relief fundraising single "We Are the World".

=== 1986–1992: Graceland and The Rhythm of the Saints ===
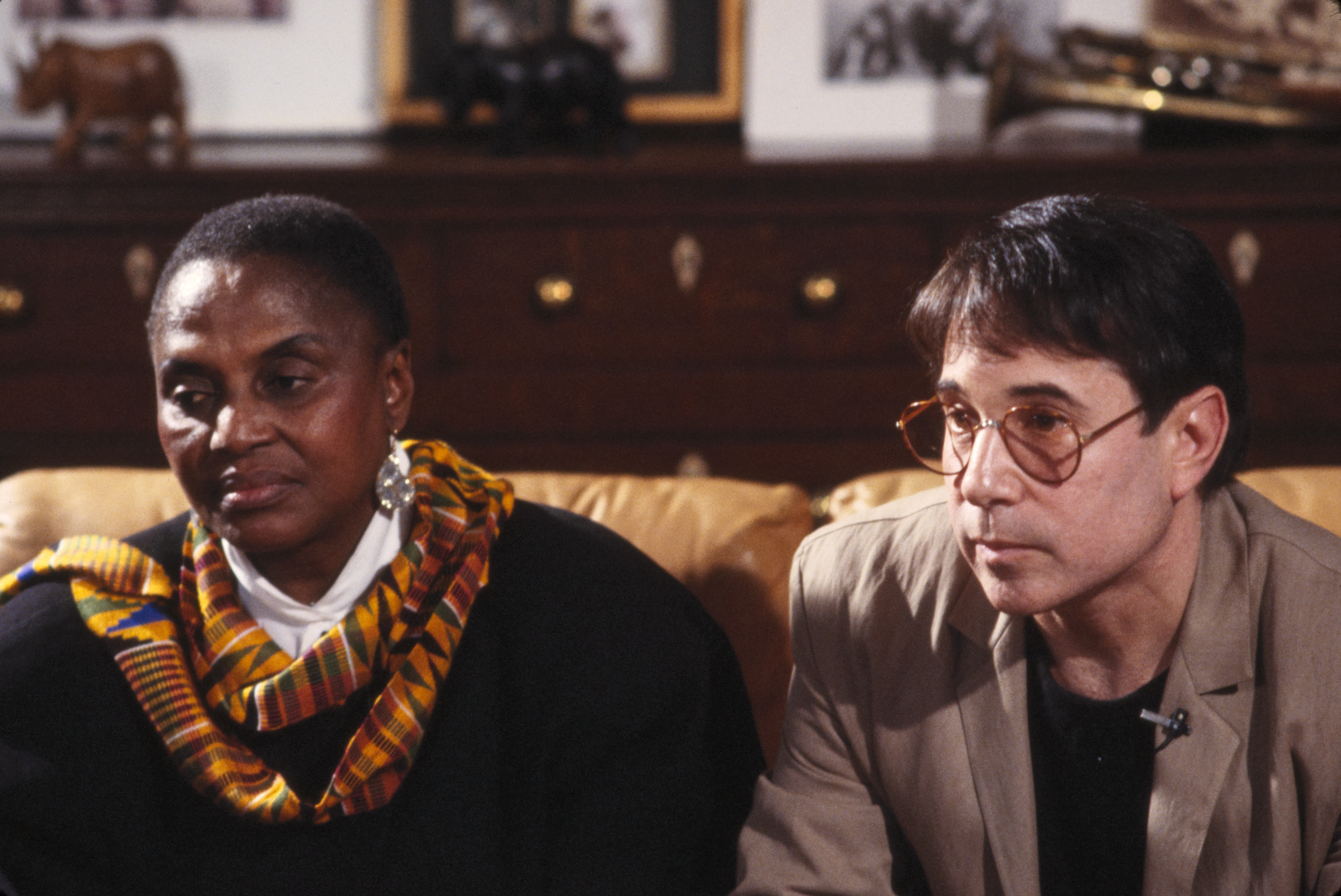
The South African singer Miriam Makeba and Simon (1986)

In 1986, Simon was awarded an Honorary Doctor of Music degree from Berklee College of Music, where he had served on the board of trustees. Simon decided to record an album of South African music after hearing a bootlegged tape of mbaqanga, South African street music, and in 1986 he traveled to Johannesburg and recorded with African musicians. Additional sessions were held in New York. The sessions featured many South African acts, notably Ladysmith Black Mambazo, and Simon also collaborated with several American artists, duetting with Linda Ronstadt on "Under African Skies" and playing with Los Lobos on "All Around the World or The Myth of Fingerprints".

The resulting album, Graceland, became Simon's most successful studio album. Simon recalled that "I improvised in two ways — by making up melodies in falsetto, and by singing any words that came to mind down in my lower and mid range. I tried not to censor the words and to keep an ear cocked to see if a phrase came out that was interesting enough to suggest that my subconscious had allowed something significant to bubble out. Though I had no intentions of writing about Elvis Presley, the word 'Graceland' came very early. While writing the lyrics, I always tried to stay true to the mood of the music, which was flowing, pleasant and easy." Stephen Holden wrote "Listening to Graceland, one gets the sense of an artist submitting to, and being swept up by, musical forces he does not totally understand. Adding a crucial extra dimension to the album is Mr. Simon's very urbane literary sensibility, which pulls against the simplicity of the music and lends the songs a kind of double vision. The music extends and enriches the language while the lyrics meditate on the music." It is estimated to have sold more than 16 million copies worldwide. Graceland won the 1987 Grammy for Album of the Year. In 2006, it was added to the United States' National Recording Registry as "culturally, historically or aesthetically important".

Simon was accused of breaking the cultural boycott imposed by the rest of the world against South Africa's apartheid regime by organizations such as Artists United Against Apartheid, anti-apartheid musicians (including Billy Bragg, Paul Weller and Jerry Dammers), and James Victor Gbeho (Ghana's Ambassador to the United Nations). Simon denied that he had gone to South Africa to "take money out of the country" and said he paid the black artists and split royalties with them and was not paid to play to a white-only audience. The United Nations Anti-Apartheid Committee supported Graceland, as it showcased black South African musicians and offered no support to the South African government, but the African National Congress protested that it was a violation of the boycott. The Congress voted to ban Simon from South Africa and he was added to the United Nations blacklist, from which he was removed in January 1987. In 1989, Simon appeared on Dion's song "Written on the Subway Wall"/"Little Star" from Yo Frankie, which peaked at number 97 in October 1990. In 1992, Simon and his band were invited to play in South Africa by Nelson Mandela.

After Graceland, Simon extended his roots with the Brazilian-flavored The Rhythm of the Saints. Sessions for the album began in December 1989 in Rio de Janeiro and New York and featured guitarist J.J. Cale and Brazilian and African musicians. The album's tone is more introspective and low-key than that of Graceland. Released in October 1990, the album received excellent reviews and sold well, peaking at number 4 in the U.S. and number 1 in the UK. The lead single, "The Obvious Child", featuring the Grupo Cultural Olodum, became Simon's last Top 20 hit in the UK and appeared near the bottom of the Billboard Hot 100. Although not as successful as Graceland, The Rhythm of the Saints received a Grammy nomination for Album of the Year. Simon's ex-wife Carrie Fisher wrote in her autobiography Wishful Drinking that the song "She Moves On" is about her: "If you can get Paul Simon to write a song about you, do it. Because he is so brilliant at it."

The success of both albums allowed Simon to stage another concert in New York. On August 15, 1991, he gave a second concert in Central Park, with African and South American bands. The concert's success surpassed all expectations, and 48,500 people are estimated to have attended. He later remembered the concert as "the most memorable moment in my career". Its success led to a live album and an Emmy-winning TV special. Simon embarked on the "Born at the Right Time" tour and promoted the album with further singles, including "Proof", which was accompanied by a humorous video featuring Chevy Chase and Steve Martin. On March 4, 1992, Simon performed on an episode of MTV Unplugged. Simon & Garfunkel were inducted into the Rock and Roll Hall of Fame in 1990.

=== 1993–1998: Paul Simon 1964/1993 and The Capeman ===
Another Simon & Garfunkel reunion took place in September 1993, and Columbia released Paul Simon 1964/1993. Originally a three-disc compilation, it became a reduced version on the two-disc album The Paul Simon Anthology one month later. In 1995, Simon appeared on The Oprah Winfrey Show and performed the song "Ten Years", which he had composed for the show's tenth anniversary. Also in 1995 he featured in the Annie Lennox version of his 1973 song "Something So Right", which appeared briefly on the UK Top 50 after it was released as a single.

Simon collaborated with poet Derek Walcott on a musical, The Capeman, that opened on January 29, 1998. He worked enthusiastically on the project for many years, and described it as "a New York Puerto Rican story based on events that happened in 1959—events that I remembered." The musical told the story of a real-life Puerto Rican youth, Salvador Agron, who wore a cape while committing two murders in New York in 1959. He became a writer while in prison. Featuring Marc Anthony as the young Agron and Rubén Blades as the older Agron, the play was not a success, receiving mixed reviews and poor box-office receipts. Clive Barnes wrote "Here is the most bewitching and bewitched Broadway score in years -- music that, in a quite different way, only Stephen Sondheim has equaled," but that "it was West Side Story particularized, de-prettified and de-balleticized. A tough call for entertainment."

Simon recorded an album of songs from the show which was released in November 1997. The album received mixed reviews. Some critics praised its combination of doo-wop, rockabilly, and Caribbean music, but Songs from The Capeman was a failure, and for the first time in Simon's career he did not reach the Top 40 of the Billboard charts. The cast album was never released on CD but eventually became available online.

=== 1999–2007: You're the One and Surprise ===
In the 1990s and 2000s, Simon played the character of Simple Simon in the Disney Channel TV movie Mother Goose Rock 'n' Rhyme, and provided cameos in Millennium and The Great Buck Howard. Due to poor reception and lack of profitability from The Capeman, Simon's career was in an unexpected crisis, but he continued to record new material. In 1999, he embarked on a three-month North American tour with Bob Dylan, in which he and Dylan alternated as the headline act with a middle section where they performed together. The collaboration was generally well-received, with just one critic, Seth Rogovoy of the Berkshire Eagle, questioning the collaboration.

In 2000, Simon wrote and recorded a new album, You're the One, very quickly. The album was released in October and consisted mostly of folk-pop writing combined with foreign musical sounds, particularly grooves from North Africa. The album received favorable reviews, reached both the British and American Top 20, and received a Grammy nomination for Album of the Year. Simon toured extensively to promote it, and one performance in Paris was released to home video. In the aftermath of the September 11 attacks in America, Simon sang "Bridge Over Troubled Water" on America: A Tribute to Heroes, a multi-network broadcast to benefit the September 11 Telethon Fund, and performed "The Boxer" at the start of the first episode of Saturday Night Live after September 11. In 2002, he wrote and recorded "Father and Daughter", the theme song for the animated family film The Wild Thornberrys Movie. The track was nominated for an Academy Award for Best Song.

In 2003, Simon and Garfunkel performed together again when they received a Grammy Lifetime Achievement Award. This reunion led to a U.S. tour, the acclaimed "Old Friends" concert series, followed by a 2004 international encore, culminating in a free concert at the Colosseum in Rome that attracted an audience of 600,000. In 2005, they sang "Mrs. Robinson" and "Homeward Bound" together, plus "Bridge Over Troubled Water" with Aaron Neville, in the benefit concert From the Big Apple to The Big Easy – The Concert for New Orleans (eventually released as a DVD) for Hurricane Katrina victims. In 2004, Simon's studio albums were re-released both individually and as a collection in a limited-edition, nine-CD boxed set, Paul Simon: The Studio Recordings 1972–2000. Simon was then working with Brian Eno on a new album, Surprise, which was released in May 2006. Most of its songs were inspired by the September 11 attacks and the Iraq War. Simon also took inspiration from having turned 60 in 2001, which he humorously referred to in "Old" from You're the One. Surprise was a commercial hit, reaching number 14 on the Billboard 200 and number 4 in the UK. Most critics praised the album. Stephen Thomas Erlewine of AllMusic wrote, "Simon doesn't achieve his comeback by reconnecting with the sound and spirit of his classic work; he has achieved it by being as restless and ambitious as he was at his popular and creative peak." The album was supported by the Surprise Tour in 2006.

In 2007, Simon was the inaugural recipient of the Library of Congress's Gershwin Prize for Popular Song, and he later performed as part of a gala of his work.

=== 2008–2013: So Beautiful or So What and touring ===
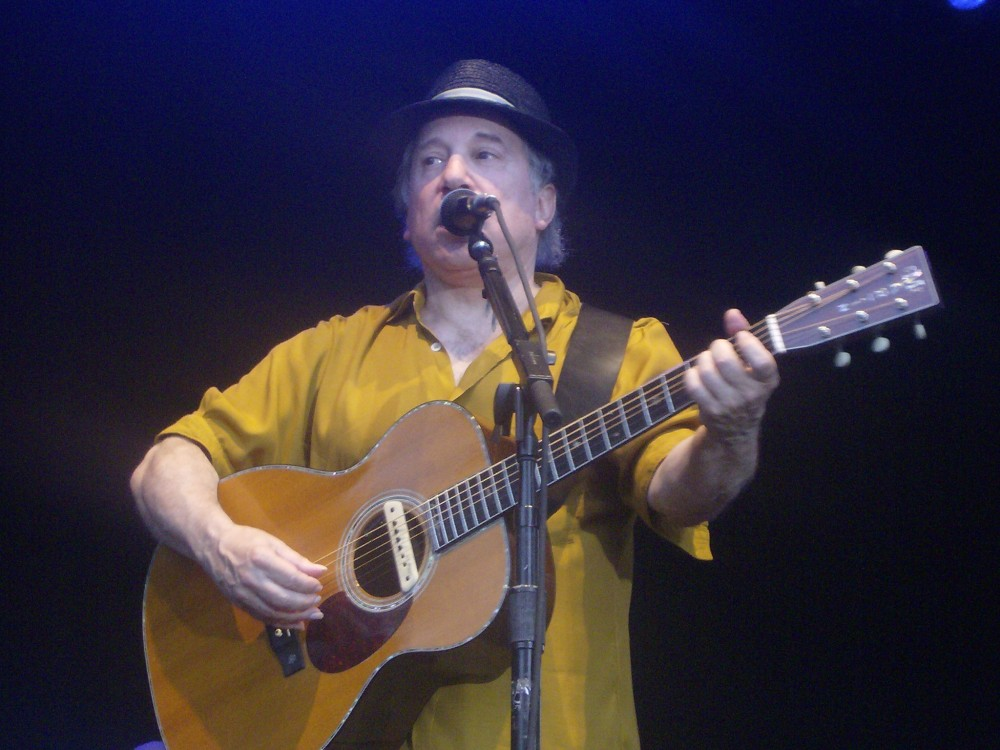
Simon performing live in Mainz, Germany, July 25, 2008

After living in Montauk, New York, for many years, Simon relocated to New Canaan, Connecticut. He is one of a small number of performers who are named as the copyright owner on their recordings (most records have the recording company as the named owner). This development followed the Bee Gees' successful $200-million lawsuit against RSO Records, the largest successful suit against a record company by an artist or group. All of Simon's solo recordings, including those originally issued by Columbia Records, are distributed by Sony Records' Legacy Recordings unit. His albums were issued by Warner Music Group until mid-2010, when Simon moved his catalog of solo work from Warner Bros. Records to Sony/Columbia Records, which holds the Simon & Garfunkel catalog.

In April 2008, Songs From the Capeman played at the Brooklyn Academy of Music with original cast members and the Spanish Harlem Orchestra. Simon appeared during the BAM shows, performing "Trailways Bus" and "Late in the Evening". In February 2009, Simon performed back-to-back shows in New York City at the recently renovated Beacon Theatre. He was joined by Garfunkel and the cast of The Capeman in the first show. The band included Graceland bassist Bakithi Kumalo. In May 2009, Simon toured with Garfunkel in Australia, New Zealand and Japan, and in October they appeared together at the 25th Anniversary Rock and Roll Hall of Fame Concerts. At that concert, Simon duetted with Dion on "The Wanderer" and with Graham Nash and David Crosby on "Here Comes the Sun". In April 2010, Simon & Garfunkel performed together again at the New Orleans Jazz & Heritage Festival. In August 2010, The Capeman was staged for three nights in the Delacorte Theatre in New York's Central Park. The production was directed by Diane Paulus and produced in conjunction with the Public Theater.

Simon released a new song, "Getting Ready for Christmas Day", on November 10, 2010. The song sampled a 1941 sermon by J. M. Gates and premiered on National Public Radio Simon performed the song on The Colbert Report on December 16, 2010. In the first show of the final season of The Oprah Winfrey Show on September 10, 2010, Simon performed a song that commemorated the show's 25 years, an update of a song he wrote for its 10th anniversary. Simon's next album, So Beautiful or So What, was released on the Concord Music Group label on April 12, 2011, and Simon said it was the best work he had done in 20 years. It was reported that he had wanted to have Bob Dylan perform on the album. At the end of his 2011 World Tour, which included the U.S., the UK, the Netherlands, Switzerland, and Germany, Simon appeared at Ramat Gan Stadium in Israel in July 2011, his first concert appearance in Israel since 1983. On the 10th anniversary of the September 11 attacks, he performed "The Sound of Silence" at the National September 11 Memorial & Museum in New York, on the site of the destroyed World Trade Center.

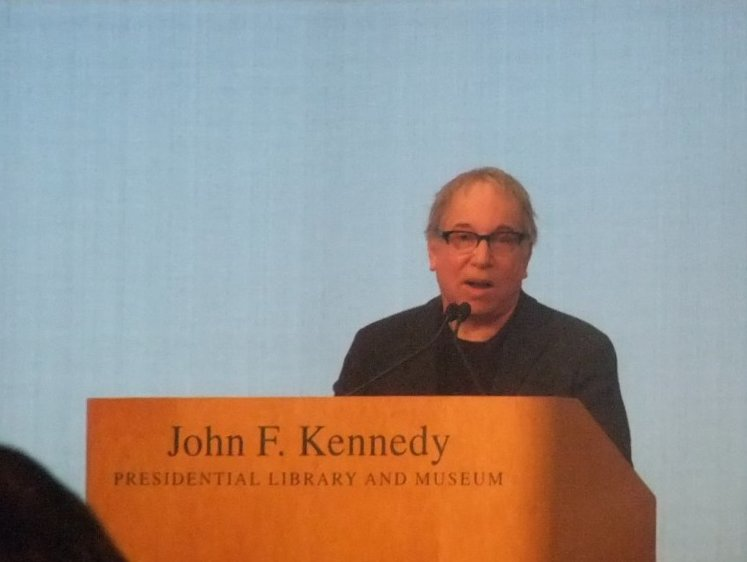
Simon paying tribute to musicians Leonard Cohen and Chuck Berry, the recipients of the first annual PEN Awards for songwriting excellence, at the John F. Kennedy Presidential Library and Museum on February 26, 2012

On February 26, 2012, Simon paid tribute to fellow musicians Chuck Berry and Leonard Cohen, who had received the first annual PEN Awards for songwriting excellence at the JFK Presidential Library. In 2012, Simon released a 25th-anniversary box set of Graceland that included a remastered edition of the original album; the 2012 documentary film Under African Skies; the original 1987 "African Concert" from Zimbabwe; an audio narrative, The Story of Graceland, related by Simon; and other interviews and memorabilia. He played a few concerts in Europe with the original musicians to commemorate the anniversary. On December 19, 2012, Simon performed at the funeral of Victoria Leigh Soto, a teacher killed in the Sandy Hook Elementary School shooting. In September 2013, he delivered the Richard Ellmann Lecture in Modern Literature at Emory University.

=== 2014–2022: Stranger to Stranger and In the Blue Light ===
In 2014, Simon embarked on a joint 21-date concert tour of North America, On Stage Together, with English musician Sting. The tour continued in 2015 with ten shows in Australia and New Zealand and 23 in Europe.

Simon made a surprise appearance in The Late Show with Stephen Colbert on September 11, 2015. He performed "Me and Julio Down by the Schoolyard" with Colbert, having been billed before the show as a Simon & Garfunkel Tribute Band. He also performed "American Tune", which was posted on the show's YouTube channel. In 2015, Dion released the single "New York Is My Home" with Simon.

Simon wrote and performed the theme song for comedian Louis C.K.'s show Horace and Pete, which debuted on January 30, 2016. The song is heard during the show's opening, intermission, and closing credits and features Simon's voice and acoustic guitar. Simon made a cameo appearance onscreen in the series' final episode. On June 3, 2016, he released his 13th solo studio album, Stranger to Stranger, on Concord Records.

In 2011, Simon was introduced to Italian electronic dance music artist Clap! Clap! by his son, Adrian, who was a fan of his work. They met in 2011 when Simon was touring So Beautiful or So What in Italy. Simon collaborated with him on three songs, and also worked with longtime friend Roy Halee, who co-produced the album. After the release of the album, Simon said he was no longer interested in showbiz and talked about retirement. He said, "I am going to see what happens if I let go". In the 2010s he appeared briefly in shows such as Portlandia, Welcome to Sweden and Horace & Pete. He appeared as an interviewee and as a musical guest on talk shows such as The Dick Cavett Show, Late Night with David Letterman, The Late Show with David Letterman, The Colbert Report, Late Night with Jimmy Fallon and The Late Show with Stephen Colbert. He was the subject of two films by Jeremy Marre on the making of Graceland and The Capeman.

Simon performed "Bridge over Troubled Water" at the 2016 Democratic National Convention on July 25, 2016. He debuted a new version of "Questions for the Angels" with jazz guitarist Bill Frisell on The Late Show with Stephen Colbert on May 24, 2017. On February 5, 2018, Simon announced his intention to retire from touring, citing time away from his family and the death of longtime guitarist Vincent Nguini. He did not rule out performing live again. He began a farewell concert tour, Homeward Bound – The Farewell Tour, in May 2018 in Vancouver, Canada, and performed shows across North America and Europe. He played his final concert in Queens, New York, on September 22, 2018.

In 2018, Simon released his 14th solo studio album, In the Blue Light, which consisted of re-recordings of lesser-known songs from his catalog, some with altered arrangements, harmonic structures and lyrics. On August 11, 2019, he returned to live performance when he closed San Francisco's Outside Lands festival in Golden Gate Park. He said he planned to donate his net proceeds to local environmental nonprofit organizations. American Songwriter honored Dion's "Song for Sam Cooke (Here in America)", featuring Simon, as the "Greatest of the Great 2020 Songs". Simon sold his music publishing catalog to Sony Music Publishing in March 2021. He was previously signed to Universal Music Publishing Group. He appeared in Ken Burns's Country Music discussing the influence of the Everly Brothers.

=== 2023–present: Seven Psalms and return to touring ===
Simon released a new album, Seven Psalms, in April 2023. A documentary of the project, In Restless Dreams: The Music of Paul Simon, was made by Alex Gibney. The album was described as 33 minutes of uninterrupted musical meditation, consisting of seven pieces performed on acoustic guitar, linked by a motif derived from "Anji", with elements of folk, blues, and jazz, and lyrics that reflect on life, death, and faith. The inspiration for the album came to Simon in 2020. He recalled, "I had a dream so vivid it made me get up in the middle of the night and write it down ... a voice said 'You are meant to be working on a piece called 'Seven Psalms'." For the next few months, isolated by the COVID-19 pandemic on a Texas ranch, Simon worked on a series of guitar pieces and added sounds like distant church bells produced by amplified upside-down wine glasses. He said, "I envisioned Seven Psalms as one long thought, combined with sounds powerful enough to make the thought come alive." In December 2023, Simon rehearsed Seven Psalms with two acoustic guitarists. He said he missed performing and hoped that it might be possible to play the album live.

Simon had planned to retire from music, but after the success of Seven Psalms, he completed another song, composed four more guitar pieces, and was planning an album of duets with his wife, singer Edie Brickell. He was also in the early stages of working on a musical. In a May 2023 interview with The Times, he said he had lost most of the hearing in his left ear. In February 2025, Simon performed "Homeward Bound" with Sabrina Carpenter at a 50th-anniversary special for Saturday Night Live. That month, he announced the Quiet Celebration Tour, comprising performances in smaller venues in 20 cities across the U.S. and Canada and multiple nights in a row in most cities. The tour began with two shows at the Saenger Theater on April 4 and 5 in New Orleans and ended with two filmed shows at McCaw Hall in Seattle on August 5 and 6, 2025. In 2026, Simon extended the tour with a European leg and a second North American leg.

== Songwriting ==
In 2012, in an interview reprinted in American Songwriter, Simon discussed the craft of songwriting and talked about the basic themes in his lyrics—love, family, social commentary, religion, spirituality, and God. He said: "The music always precedes the words. The words often come from the sound of the music and eventually evolve into coherent thoughts. Or incoherent thoughts. Rhythm plays a crucial part in the lyric-making as well. It's like a puzzle to find the right words to express what the music is saying." In 2023, Simon said his "two big influences" were New York City doo-wop and English folk music.

== Saturday Night Live ==
Simon was the host of the second episode of SNL, on October 18, 1975. Simon appeared alongside George Harrison on the Thanksgiving Day episode of SNL on November 20, 1976, and they performed "Here Comes the Sun" and "Homeward Bound" together. Simon opened the show in a comedy sketch in which he performed "Still Crazy After All These Years", in a turkey outfit, Thanksgiving being the following week. Halfway through the song, he told the band to stop playing because he was embarrassed, gave a speech to the audience and left the stage. Lorne Michaels greeted him backstage, but Simon, still acting upset, yelled at him because of the humiliating turkey outfit. This was one of SNL's most replayed sketches.

In one SNL skit from 1986, when he was promoting Graceland, Simon played himself waiting in line with a friend to get into a movie. He amazed his friend by remembering intricate details about prior meetings with passers-by, but drew a complete blank when he was approached by Art Garfunkel. When Simon hosted an SNL episode during the 1988 Democratic Party presidential primaries, Simon walked out with Illinois Senator and presidential candidate Paul Simon, and argued about which Paul Simon was supposed to have hosting duties.

On September 29, 2001, Simon played "The Boxer" as the cold open for the first episode of SNL to air after the September 11 attacks, also the first episode of its 2001-2002 season.

Simon closed the 40th anniversary SNL show on February 15, 2015, with a performance of "Still Crazy After All These Years". He played a snippet of "I've Just Seen a Face" with Sir Paul McCartney during the introductory sequence. Much of the Thanksgiving episode from 1976 was shown during this prime-time special. On October 13, 2018, he was the musical guest on his 77th birthday. His most recent SNL appearance was on February 16, 2025, Paul Simon performed "Homeward Bound" alongside Sabrina Carpenter for the opening of the Saturday Night Live 50th Anniversary Special.

== Credits ==
=== Film ===
Year	Title	Credit(s)	Role	Notes
1967	The Graduate	Songs by	—N/a	With Art Garfunkel
1975	Shampoo	Composer	—N/a	
1977	Annie Hall	Actor	Tony Lacey	Acting debut
1980	One-Trick Pony	Actor, writer, composer	Jonah Levin	
1985	The Statue of Liberty	Composer	—N/a	
1996	Mother	Composer	—N/a	Mrs. Robinson – Movie Theme Song
2002	The Wild Thornberrys Movie	Composer	—N/a	Wrote and Performed: "Father and Daughter"
2008	The Great Buck Howard	Actor	Grateful Old Performer	Actor
2014	Henry & Me	Actor	Thurman Munson	Voice; Animated film

=== Television ===
Year	Title	Credit(s)	Role	Notes
1975–2018	Saturday Night Live	Performer	Himself / Various	18 episodes
1978	All You Need Is Cash	Actor	Himself	Television film
1990	Mother Goose Rock 'n' Rhyme	Actor	Simple Simon	Television film
1999	Millennium	Actor	John Dryden	Episode: "Via Dolorosa"
2008	The Life and Times of Allen Ginsberg Deluxe Set	Composer	—N/a	Documentary
2015	Portlandia	Actor	—N/a	Episode: "You Can Call Me Al"
2015	Welcome To Sweden	Actor	—N/a	Episode: "American Club"
2015	Saturday Night Live 40th Anniversary Special	Himself	—N/a	Performed: "Still Crazy After All These Years"
2016	Horace and Pete	Composer, actor	Customer	Composed show's opening theme music
2023	In Restless Dreams: The Music of Paul Simon	Himself	—N/a	Documentary
2025	Saturday Night Live 50th Anniversary Special	Himself	—N/a	Performed: "Homeward Bound"

=== Theater ===
- Rock 'n Roll! The First 5,000 Years (1982) – revue – featured songwriter for "Mrs. Robinson"
- Asinamali! (1987) – play – co-producer
- Mike Nichols and Elaine May: Together Again on Broadway (1992) – concert – performer
- The Capeman (1998) – composer, co-lyricist and music arranger – Tony Nomination for Best Original Score
- The Graduate (2002) – play – featured songwriter

== Awards, legacy and honors ==
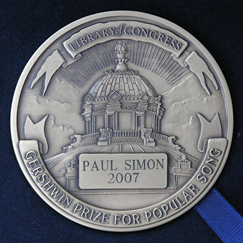
Reverse of the 2007 Library of Congress Gershwin Prize for Popular Song medal awarded to Paul Simon

Simon has earned sixteen Grammy Awards for his solo and collaborative work, including three for Album of the Year (Bridge Over Troubled Water, 1971; Still Crazy After All These Years, 1976; and Graceland, 1988), and a Lifetime Achievement Award. He is one of only eight artists to have won the Grammy Award for Album of the Year more than once as the main credited artist. In 1998, Simon was inducted into the Grammy Hall of Fame for the Simon & Garfunkel album Bridge over Troubled Water. In 2002, he received an Oscar nomination for Best Original Song for his song "Father and Daughter".

Simon has twice been inducted into the Rock and Roll Hall of Fame: in 1990 as a member of Simon & Garfunkel; and in 2001 for his solo career. In 2011, Rolling Stone named him one of the 100 greatest guitarists, and in 2015 he was ranked 8th in their list of the 100 Greatest Songwriters of All Time. In 2023, he was ranked the 246th greatest guitarist of all time by Rolling Stone. In 2001, Simon was honored as MusiCares Person of the Year. In 2002 he was one of five recipients of the annual Kennedy Center Honors, the nation's highest tribute to performing and cultural artists. In 2005, Simon was honored at the BMI Pop Awards. His songwriting catalog had earned 39 BMI Awards, including numerous citations for "Bridge over Troubled Water", "Mrs. Robinson", "Scarborough Fair" and "The Sound of Silence". (Note: By 2005, he had amassed nearly 75 million broadcast airplays, according to BMI surveys.) In 2006, he was selected by Time Magazine as one of the "100 People Who Shaped the World".

In 2007, Simon received the first annual Library of Congress Gershwin Prize for Popular Song. Named in honor of George and Ira Gershwin, this award recognized the profound and positive effect of popular music on the world's culture. Simon said, "I am grateful to be the recipient of the Gershwin Prize and doubly honored to be the first. I look forward to spending an evening in the company of artists I admire at the award ceremony in May. I can think of a few [artists] who have expressed my words and music far better than I [have]. I'm excited at the prospect of that happening again. It's a songwriter's dream come true." Among the performers who paid tribute to Simon were Stevie Wonder, Alison Krauss, Jerry Douglas, Lyle Lovett, James Taylor, Dianne Reeves, Marc Anthony, Yolanda Adams and Ladysmith Black Mambazo. The event was professionally filmed and broadcast and was released as Paul Simon and Friends. In 2012, Simon was awarded the Polar Music Prize.

== Personal life ==
=== Relationships and marriages ===
When Simon moved to England in 1964, he met Kathleen Mary "Kathy" Chitty at the first English folk club he played, the Railway Inn Folk Club in Brentwood, Essex, where Chitty worked part-time selling tickets. She was 18 and he was 22 when they began a relationship. Later that year they visited the U.S. together, mainly touring by bus. Kathy returned to England and Simon followed some weeks later. When he returned to the U.S. with the growing success of "The Sounds of Silence", Kathy, who was quite shy, wanted no part in success and fame, and they ended their relationship. She is mentioned by name in at least two of Simon's songs, "Kathy's Song" and "America". She is also referred to in "Homeward Bound" and "The Late Great Johnny Ace". A photo of Simon and Kathy is on the cover of Simon's 1965 album The Paul Simon Songbook.

==== Peggy Harper ====
Simon has been married three times, first to Peggy Harper in 1969. They had a son, Harper Simon, in 1972, and divorced in 1975, inspiring the song "50 Ways to Leave Your Lover". Simon wrote about this relationship in the song "Train in the Distance" from his 1983 album Hearts and Bones. In the late 1970s, Simon lived in New York City next door to Saturday Night Live creator Lorne Michaels, who has been described as Simon's "best friend" during the period.

==== Carrie Fisher ====
Simon met actress Shelley Duvall while filming Annie Hall in 1976. They lived together as a couple for two years until Duvall introduced him to her friend, actress Carrie Fisher. Simon and Fisher began dating in 1978, and were married from 1983 to 1984. He proposed to her after a New York Yankees game. The song "Hearts and Bones" is about their time together, and the song "Graceland" is believed to be about seeking solace from the end of the relationship by taking a road trip. A year after they divorced, Simon and Fisher resumed their relationship, which lasted several years.

==== Edie Brickell ====
Simon married singer Edie Brickell on May 30, 1992. Brickell and Simon have three children, Adrian, Lulu, and Gabriel. On April 26, 2014, Simon and Brickell were involved in a domestic dispute in which police responded to their Connecticut residence. Each was issued a summons to appear in court on disorderly conduct charges.

=== Family and interests ===
All four of his children are now adults and are musicians. Simon and his younger brother, Eddie Simon, founded the Guitar Study Center sometime before 1973. The Guitar Study Center became part of The New School in New York City, sometime before 2002.

Simon is an avid fan of the New York Rangers ice hockey team, the New York Knicks basketball team and the New York Yankees baseball team.

== Philanthropy ==
Simon is an advocate of music education for children. In 1970, after recording "Bridge Over Troubled Water", he held auditions for a young songwriters' workshop at the invitation of the NYU's Tisch School of the Arts. The auditions were advertised in The Village Voice, and brought hundreds of hopefuls to perform. Among the six teenage songwriters selected for tutelage were Melissa Manchester, Tommy Mandel and rock/beat poet Joe Linus. Maggie and Terre Roche (the Roche Sisters), who later sang back-up for Simon, joined the workshop in progress in an impromptu appearance.

Simon invited the six teenagers to experience the recording process at Columbia studios with engineer Roy Halee. During these sessions, Bob Dylan was downstairs recording his album Self-Portrait, which includes a version of Simon's "The Boxer". Violinist Isaac Stern visited the group with a CBS film crew and spoke to the young musicians about lyrics and music. Manchester later paid homage to Simon with her recorded song "Ode to Paul". Other musicians Simon mentored include Nick Laird-Clowes, who co-founded the band the Dream Academy. Laird-Clowes credited Simon with helping to shape the band's biggest hit, "Life in a Northern Town".

In 2003, Simon became a supporter of Little Kids Rock, a nonprofit organization that provided free musical instruments and free lessons to children in public schools in the U.S. He sits on the organization's board of directors as an honorary member. Simon is also a major benefactor and one of the co-founders, with Irwin Redlener, of the Children's Health Project and The Children's Health Fund which began by creating specially equipped buses to take medical care to children in medically under-served areas, both urban and rural. Their first bus was placed in the impoverished South Bronx of New York City, but the buses now operate in 12 states, including on the Gulf Coast. The project has expanded greatly and partners with major hospitals, local public schools and medical schools, and advocates policy for children's health and medical care.

In May 2012, Paul Simon performed at a benefit dinner for the Turkana Basin Institute in New York City, raising more than $2 million for Richard Leakey's research institute in Africa. For his 2019 performance at San Francisco's Outside Lands Music and Arts Festival, Simon donated his appearance fee to the San Francisco Parks Alliance and Friends of the Urban Forest. After reading Peter Singer's book The Life You Can Save, Simon became a supporter of effective altruism, a movement that uses evidence to determine where charitable giving has the greatest impact. He reflects, "You really have to know what and to whom you're giving this money. All these years I had been doing these benefit concerts with all my friends and musicians. We'd come. We'd play. We pack up our guitars. We leave. And nobody ever says, 'Where'd that money go?'" In 2015, he performed a benefit concert for the Fistula Foundation.

== Discography ==
This discography does not include compilation albums, concert albums or work with Simon & Garfunkel. Simon's solo concert albums often have songs he originally recorded with Simon & Garfunkel, and many Simon & Garfunkel concert albums contain songs Simon first recorded on solo albums.

Simon has a few songs that appear on compilation albums and nowhere else, such as "Slip Slidin' Away", which first appeared on the compilation album Greatest Hits, Etc. (1977) and has since been included in subsequent compilations such as Negotiations and Love Songs (1988).

Solo studio albums

- The Paul Simon Songbook (1965)
- Paul Simon (1972)
- There Goes Rhymin' Simon (1973)
- Still Crazy After All These Years (1975)
- One-Trick Pony (1980)
- Hearts and Bones (1983)
- Graceland (1986)
- The Rhythm of the Saints (1990)
- Songs from The Capeman (1997)
- You're the One (2000)
- Surprise (2006)
- So Beautiful or So What (2011)
- Stranger to Stranger (2016)
- In the Blue Light (2018)
- Seven Psalms (2023)

== Bibliography ==
- Kingston, Victoria (1996). Simon and Garfunkel: The Definitive Biography. London: Sidgwick & Jackson. p. 308. ISBN 9780283062674.
- Bronson, Fred (2003). The Billboard Book of Number 1 Hits. Billboard Books. ISBN 0-8230-7677-6.

== See also ==
- List of songs written by Paul Simon
- List of Queens College people
