= Late in the Evening =

Single by Paul Simon

from the album One-Trick Pony
- B-side: "How the Heart Approaches What It Yearns"
- Released: July 1980
- Genre: Pop rock; worldbeat
- Length: 4:02
- Label: Warner Bros.
- Songwriter: Paul Simon
- Producers: Paul Simon; Phil Ramone

Paul Simon singles chronology
| "Stranded in a Limousine" (1978) | "Late in the Evening" (1980) | "One-Trick Pony" (1981) |

Music video
- "Late in the Evening" on YouTube

Professional ratings
Review scores
| Source | Rating |
|---|---|
| Billboard | (favourable) |

"Late in the Evening" is a song by American singer-songwriter Paul Simon. It was the lead single from his fifth studio album, One-Trick Pony (1980), released on Warner Bros. Records. His first single release for Warner, "Late in the Evening" was released in July 1980 and became a hit on several charts worldwide. In the U.S., the song hit number six on the Billboard Hot 100. Internationally, the song was a top 20 hit in the Netherlands, Belgium, and New Zealand.

The song has received praise for Simon's lyrics, the horn interlude, and the distinctive drum part, a New York City–style Cuban Mozambique drum groove by Steve Gadd. Gadd performed the part using two pairs of drumsticks – one in each hand – in order to give the impression of two drummers playing together. Simon performed the song twice with Art Garfunkel during their 1981 reunion concert in Central Park in New York City.

== Release and reception ==
"Late in the Evening" performed on singles charts in several territories worldwide. In the U.S., the single premiered on the Billboard Hot 100 at position 46 on August 9, 1980, rising over the following weeks to a peak of number six on September 27, 1980. It spent sixteen weeks on the chart in total. It had also peaked at number seven on the magazine's Hot Adult Contemporary Tracks chart two weeks earlier, where it also spent sixteen weeks. In Canada, it first premiered on the magazine's RPM's all-genre singles chart, the RPM 100, on August 23 at number 87, eventually peaking at number 19 on October 25. It debuted on the magazine's "Adult Oriented Playlist" chart on September 6, 1980, at number 39, later peaking at number two on October 25.

In the United Kingdom, the song premiered on the UK Singles Chart on August 31, 1980, at number 74, and rose over two weeks to a peak of number 58 on September 14, 1980. It performed better in the Netherlands, peaking at number 11, in Belgium at number 15, and in New Zealand at number 19. Nearby in Australia, the song fared better than its UK performance, peaking at position 34.

Billboard described the hook consisting of a "percussive and bass duet" as being "irresistible". Record World said that it's highlighted by "spirited brass, percussion & guitars".

== Personnel ==
- Paul Simon – vocals
- Steve Gadd – drums
- Tony Levin – bass guitar
- Eric Gale – electric guitar
- Hugh McCracken – acoustic guitar
- Ralph MacDonald – cowbell, temple blocks
- Dave Grusin – horn arrangements

== Charts ==
=== Weekly charts ===
| Chart (1980) | Peak position |
|---|---|
| Australia (Kent Music Report) | 34 |
| Belgium (Ultratop 50 Flanders) | 15 |
| Canada (RPM) Top Singles | 19 |
| Canada Adult Oriented Playlist (RPM) | 2 |
| Israel (IBA) | 2 |
| Netherlands (Dutch Top 40) | 9 |
| Netherlands (Single Top 100) | 11 |
| New Zealand (Recorded Music NZ) | 19 |
| UK Singles (Official Charts) | 58 |
| UK Airplay (Record Business) | 5 |
| US Billboard Hot 100 | 6 |
| US Adult Contemporary (Billboard) | 7 |
| Zimbabwe (ZIMA) | 3 |

=== Year-end charts ===
| Chart (1980) | Position |
|---|---|
| Netherlands (Dutch Top 40) | 80 |

== Notes ==
=== Sources ===
- Bennighof, James (2007). The Words and Music of Paul Simon. Greenwood Publishing Group. ISBN 978-0-275-99163-0.
- Eliot, Marc (2010). Paul Simon: A Life. John Wiley and Sons. ISBN 978-0-470-43363-8.
- Kingston, Victoria (2000). Simon & Garfunkel: The Biography. Fromm International. ISBN 978-0-88064-246-0.
