= The Paul Simon Anthology =

Compilation album by Paul Simon
- Released: 1993
- Genre: Rock
- Label: Warner Bros.

Paul Simon chronology
Negotiations and Love Songs (1988)	The Paul Simon Anthology (1993)	Paul Simon 1964/1993 (1993)

Professional ratings
Review scores
Source	Rating
Allmusic	4/5 stars

The Paul Simon Anthology is the fourth greatest hits compilation album by American singer-songwriter Paul Simon, which was released in 1993. It featured one previously unreleased track, "Thelma".

== Track listing ==
CD 1

1. "The Sound of Silence" – 3:06
2. "Cecilia" – 2:54
3. "El Condor Pasa" – 3:06
4. "The Boxer" – 5:08
5. "Mrs. Robinson" – 3:54
6. "Bridge over Troubled Water" – 4:49
7. "Me and Julio Down by the Schoolyard" – 2:42
8. "Peace Like a River" – 3:16
9. "Mother and Child Reunion" – 2:59
10. "American Tune" – 3:44
11. "Loves Me Like a Rock" – 3:18
12. "Kodachrome" – 3:30
13. "Gone at Last" – 3:29
14. "Still Crazy After All These Years" (Live) – 3:50
15. "Something So Right" – 4:30
16. "50 Ways to Leave Your Lover" – 3:06
17. "Slip Slidin' Away" – 4:44
18. "Late in the Evening" – 3:55
19. "Hearts and Bones" – 5:38
20. "Rene and Georgette Magritte with Their Dog after the War" – 3:42

CD 2

1. "The Boy in the Bubble" – 4:01
2. "Graceland" – 4:50
3. "Under African Skies" – 3:37
4. "That was Your Mother" – 2:53
5. "Diamonds on the Soles of Her Shoes" – 5:48
6. "You Can Call Me Al" – 4:42
7. "Homeless" – 3:50
8. "Spirit Voices" – 3:58
9. "The Obvious Child" – 4:10
10. "Can't Run But" – 3:36
11. "Thelma" – 4:16
12. "Further to Fly" – 5:35
13. "She Moves On" – 4:57
14. "Born at the Right Time" (Live) – 5:08
15. "The Cool, Cool River" (Live) – 5:44
16. "The Sound of Silence" (Live) – 5:41

== Personnel ==
=== Musicians ===
- Ademola Adepoju – pedal steel guitar
- Francisco Aguabella – congas
- Artur Andres – percussion
- Mingo Araújo – castanet, conga, drums, percussion, surdo, talking drum
- Ken Ascher – organ
- Patti Austin – background vocals
- Cyro Baptista – percussion
- Barry Beckett – keyboard
- Adrian Belew – guitar
- Beloba – percussion
- Hal Blaine – conga, drums, percussion
- Michael Brecker – saxophone
- Randy Brecker – piccolo trumpet, trumpet
- Briz – background vocals
- Bob Bushnell – bass guitar
- J.J. Cale – guitar
- Pete Carr – guitar
- Anthony Carrillo – bongos
- Fred Carter Jr. – guitar
- Tony Cedras – keyboard
- Dom Chacal – bata, bongos, conga, gourd, percussion
- Wells Christy – synclavier
- Kim Cissel – trombone
- Bob Cranshaw – bass guitar
- Jorge Ferreira da Silva – percussion
- Wilson DasNeves – cowbell, percussion
- The Dixie Hummingbirds – vocal group
- Jerry Douglas – Dobro
- Pete Drake – Dobro, pedal steel guitar
- Gordon Edwards – bass guitar
- Don Elliott – vibraphone
- The Everly Brothers – vocals
- Jon Faddis – trumpet
- Babacar Faye – percussion
- Alex Foster – alto saxophone
- Steve Gadd – drums
- Alexander Gafa – guitar
- Eric Gale – electric guitar
- Earl Gardner – trumpet
- Art Garfunkel – vocals
- Russell George – bass guitar
- Florence Gnimagnon – background vocals
- Morris Goldberg – penny whistle
- Gordinho – surdo
- Al Gorgoni – guitar
- Bobby Gregg – drums
- Winston Grennan – drums
- The Harptones – vocals
- Roger Hawkins – drums
- Giovanni Hidalgo – conga
- Neville Hinds – organ
- David Hood – bass guitar
- Cissy Houston – vocals
- Johnny Hoyt – saxophone
- Anthony Jackson – bass guitar, contrabass guitar
- Jackie Jackson – bass guitar
- Alonzo Johnson – bass
- Jimmy Johnson – guitar
- Remy Kabocka – talking drum
- Vusi Khumalo – drums
- Larry Knechtel – keyboards, piano, bass
- Ladysmith Black Mambazo – vocals
- Denzil Laing – percussion
- Tony Levin – bass guitar
- Ralph MacDonald – percussion
- Makhaya Mahlangu – percussion
- Mike Mainieri – marimba, vibraphone
- Marçalzinho – percussion
- Hugh Masekela – flugelhorn
- Mazzola – chicote
- Charlie McCoy – harmonica
- Hugh McCracken – electric guitar, acoustic guitar
- Victor Montanez – drums
- Airto Moreira – percussion
- Sidinho Moreira – bongos, conga, percussion, surdu, tambourine
- Forere Motloheloa – accordion
- Rob Mounsey – synthesizer
- Isaac Mtshali – drums
- Muscle Shoals – rhythm section
- Youssou N'Dour – percussion
- Milton Nascimento – lyrics, vocals
- Vincent Nguini – guitar, claves, bass guitar
- The Oak Ridge Boys – vocal group
- Joe Osborn – bass guitar
- Dean Parks – hi-string guitar
- Greg Phillinganes – synthesizer
- Chikapa "Ray" Phiri – arranger, guitar, guitar arrangements
- Leonard Pickett – tenor saxophone
- Raphael Rabello – guitar
- Décio Ramos – percussion
- Sherman Robertson – guitar
- Linda Ronstadt – vocals
- Alan Rubin – trumpet
- Alton Rubin – drums
- Dave Rubin – washboard
- Armand Sabal-Lecco – bass guitar
- Robert Sabino – piano
- Paulinho Santos – percussion
- Paulo Sérgio Santos – chicote
- Bobby Scott – piano
- John Selolwane – guitar
- Joseph Shabalala – vocals
- Paul Simon – vocals, acoustic and electric guitar, synthesizer
- Valerie Simpson – background vocals
- Von Eva Sims – vocals
- Phoebe Snow – vocals
- Pedro Sorongo – percussion, scraper
- David Spinozza – guitar
- Renelle Stafford – vocals
- Rigo Star – guitar
- Grady Tate – drums
- Richard Tee – Fender Rhodes, keyboards, piano, synthesizer
- Assane Thaim – percussion
- John Tropea – electric guitar
- Deidre Tuck – vocals
- Uakti – percussion
- Naná Vasconcelos – conga, gourd, percussion, triangle
- Kim Wilson – harmonica

=== Production ===
- Greg Calbi – mastering
- Deborah Feingold – cover photo
- Art Garfunkel – producer
- Gregg Geller – consultant
- Philip Glass – liner notes
- Dave Grusin – horn arrangements
- Roy Halee – engineer, musical supervision, producer
- The Harptones – vocal arrangement
- Jeri Heiden – art direction, design
- Kevin Howlett – liner notes
- Bob Johnston – producer
- Quincy Jones – arranger
- Mazzola – arrangements, rhythm production
- Jorge Milchberg – arranger
- Forere Motloheloa – composer
- Muscle Shoals – producer
- Del Newman – string arrangements
- Vincent Nguini – guitar arrangements
- Chikapa "Ray" Phiri – guitar arrangements
- Phil Ramone – producer, recording supervision
- Jacob Sam – composer
- Paul Samwell-Smith – producer

Joseph Shabalala – composer, lyricist

- Paul Simon – arranger, composer, lyrics, producer
- Steven Strassman – assistant engineer
- Peter Thwaites – assistant engineer
- Russ Titelman – producer
- Richard Travali – assistant engineer
- Paul Zollo – liner notes

== Charts ==
Chart (1990)	Peak position
Australian Albums (ARIA)	14
New Zealand Albums (RMNZ)	5

== Certifications ==
Region	Certification	Certified units/sales
Australia (ARIA)	Platinum	70,000^{^}
New Zealand (RMNZ)	3× Platinum	45,000^{^}
United Kingdom (BPI)	Silver	60,000^{^}
^{^} Shipments figures based on certification alone.
