= Paul Simon's Concert in the Park =

Live album by Paul Simon
- Released: November 5, 1991
- Recorded: August 15, 1991
- Venue: Central Park (New York City)
- Genres: Pop rock; folk rock; worldbeat
- Length: 117:28
- Label: Warner Bros.
- Producer: Paul Simon

Paul Simon chronology
The Rhythm of the Saints (1990)	Paul Simon's Concert in the Park (1991)	Songs from The Capeman (1997)

Paul Simon's Concert in the Park is a live album and concert film recorded by Paul Simon as part of his 1991–92 "Born at the Right Time" Tour, with an extensive live backing band comprising top studio and touring musicians as well as a guest appearance at the start by the Brazilian percussion group Olodum. The concert took place in New York City’s Central Park on August 15, 1991, and was broadcast live on the HBO television network as well as being recorded for audio and video release.

== Recording and release ==
Paul Simon's Concert in the Park was recorded during Simon's worldwide 1991–92 "Born at the Right Time" Tour and provided a survey of his two most recent albums, Graceland and The Rhythm of the Saints, and also drew liberally from his earlier songbook including a number of tunes from the Simon & Garfunkel era. 600,000 people were initially claimed to have attended the show, which was held in New York's Central Park on August 15, 1991. Later estimates determined that the maximum number of people who could fit in the park space was 48,500. The concert was similar to The Concert in Central Park, a reunion concert for Simon and Garfunkel held ten years earlier. The concert was broadcast live on TV on the HBO channel and was reportedly recorded live through 96 microphone channels and 20 discrete stage mixers. It was then released, with minor track differences, on audio as double live-album (LP), double CD, and audiocassette, and on video as a VHS tape and LaserDisc. A DVD release was not made for many years due to contractual difficulties but finally appeared in 2018 as a PBS exclusive.

== Reception ==
Professional ratings
Review scores
Source	Rating
Allmusic	link
Christgau's Consumer Guide	(dud)

On its release, the audio version of the album reached only a "disappointing" No. 60 and stayed in the charts for just one week. However, critical reaction was good; writing in 1997, Chris Charlesworth states:

From the snap crackle and pop of the drum fanfare to the mellifluous beauty of the loveliest version of 'Sounds of Silence' you'll find anywhere, Paul Simon's Concert in the Park is the (double) album to own if you want only one Paul Simon album on your shelf ... [Simon's] meticulous attention to detail shines out in the re-arrangements of every song.

On AllMusic, William Ruhlmann gives the album four stars out of five, and writes:

Simon made such stylistically various material work together by front-loading the set with the newer stuff and rearranging some of the older solo stuff, so that "Kodachrome," for example, was refitted with a guitar line courtesy of Graceland player Ray Phiri ... Simon also toned down the Brazilian percussion that had dominated the Saints material and sang it more convincingly, so that "Born at the Right Time," for example, was far more effective than it had been in its studio version. On the whole, then, Concert in the Park managed to be an enjoyable and surprisingly cohesive career summary.

== Track listing ==
All tracks are written by Paul Simon, except as noted.

Disc 1
No.	Title	Lyrics	Music	Length
1.	"The Obvious Child"			4:38
2.	"The Boy in the Bubble"	Paul Simon	Paul Simon; Forere Motloheloa	5:59
3.	"She Moves On"			6:26
4.	"Kodachrome"			4:14
5.	"Born at the Right Time"			5:12
6.	"Train in the Distance"			4:46
7.	"Me and Julio Down by the Schoolyard"			3:14
8.	"I Know What I Know"	Paul Simon	Paul Simon; General M. D. Shiranda	4:45
9.	"The Cool, Cool River"			5:41
10.	"Bridge over Troubled Water"			5:16
11.	"Proof"			5:36
Total length:				55:47

Disc 2
No.	Title	Lyrics	Music	Length
1.	"The Coast"	Paul Simon	Paul Simon; Vincent Nguini	7:03
2.	"Graceland"			5:31
3.	"You Can Call Me Al"			5:10
4.	"Still Crazy After All These Years"			3:43
5.	"Loves Me Like a Rock"			2:54
6.	"Diamonds on the Soles of Her Shoes"			9:31
7.	"Hearts and Bones"			6:18
8.	"Late in the Evening"			4:45
9.	"America"			3:23
10.	"The Boxer"			4:19
11.	"Cecilia"			3:24
12.	"The Sound of Silence"			5:40
Total length:				61:41 117:28

== Personnel ==
- Paul Simon – vocals, acoustic guitar (electric guitar on "Late in the Evening" and "The Sound of Silence")
- Mingo Araujo – percussion
- Cyro Baptista – percussion
- Chris Botti – trumpet
- Michael Brecker – saxophones, EWI
- Tony Cedras – keyboards, accordion
- Dom Chacal – percussion
- Steve Gadd – drums
- Sidinho Moreira – percussion
- Vincent Nguini – guitar
- Ray Phiri – guitar
- Barney Rachabane – saxophone, pennywhistle
- Armand Sabal-Lecco – bass guitar
- John Selolwane – guitar
- Richard Tee – musical director, keyboards
- The Waters (Oren Waters, Maxine Waters and Julia Waters) – vocals

Guests: Briz and Grupo Cultural OLODUM for "The Obvious Child" and Chevy Chase join Paul, dancing for the second of two performances of "You Can Call Me Al".

== Formats ==
This title was released in both audio and video formats.

- As a double live-album, it was released on CD, cassette and vinyl LP.
- Both VHS and LaserDisc formats were released with "Cecilia" omitted from the VHS and both "Cecilia" and "The Coast" omitted from the LaserDisc.

In July 2011 a Facebook campaign was started to request a release of the concert on DVD and Blu-ray. It was released on DVD in 2018, through PBS membership rewards, but was only available for a limited period in the USA and had no worldwide release. The long delay could be due to the contract with Pioneer that restricted the digital release of concerts by artists signed to Warner on any future format.

In February 2025 the full concert, in its original 4:3 aspect ratio, became available for rental or purchase via streaming on Apple TV, Amazon Prime Video and Fandango. On April 19, 2025 the entire concert was broadcast in the United Kingdom for the first time on BBC2 at 9.15pm. A heavily edited version, co-produced by Dan Klores, had previously been broadcast in December 1991.

== Trivia ==
- Actor Chevy Chase made a guest appearance on stage for the song "You Can Call Me Al". Chase also starred in the official music video for the song.

== Charts ==
Chart performance for Paul Simon's Concert in the Park
Chart (1991–1992)	Peak position
Australian Albums (ARIA)	91
Dutch Albums (Album Top 100)	25
UK Albums (Official Charts)	60
US Billboard 200	74

== Certifications ==
Certifications for Paul Simon's Concert in the Park
Region	Certification	Certified units/sales
South Africa (RISA)	Gold	25,000

== See also ==
- The Concert in Central Park – Live album by Simon & Garfunkel
