= Batala (music) =

Music group

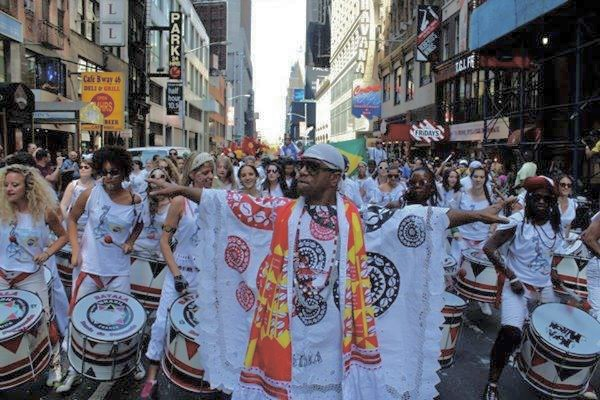
Batala founder Giba Gonçalves with members of Batala in New York City

Batalá is an international samba reggae music project. The name Batalá is a combination of the phrase "bate lá" meaning "hit there" in Portuguese and Obatalá (Oxalá), the Candomblé deity who is the father of the Orixas and of all humanity.

Batalá was founded in Paris in 1997 by Giba Gonçalves, a Bahian percussionist with links to Ilê Aiyê, Olodum, Muzenza, Male Debale, Jimmy Cliff, Tupi Nago, and Kaoma. Batala currently has over 45 groups in 17 countries and a worldwide membership of over 1,500 percussionists.

== History ==
In the 1990s, Batala founder Giba Gonçalves was living in Paris studying Composition and Bass Guitar at the Paris Conservatoire. While Gonçalves was abroad his friend Alberto Pitta, the ex-artistic director of Olodum, started the educational project Instituto Oya de Arte e Educacao in Salvador de Bahia, Brazil. This project included Bloco Cortejo Afro, a school for dance, percussion, printing, textile design, fashion design, and capoeira. Gonçalves formed Batala as an international extension of Bloco Cortejo Afro in collaboration with Alberto Pitta. Batala was officially formed in 1997, and Cortejo Afro was officially formed in 1998, but the two groups have always been closely affiliated.

== Relationship with Cortejo Afro ==
In order to maintain a connection to Cortejo Afro while simultaneously creating an independent musical group, Gonçalves adapted and changed much of their repertoire for use in Batala. As a result, Batala and Cortejo Afro share many of the same rhythms played with slight differences, and members of Batala have performed at the Salvador Carnival as part of the Cortejo Afro Bloco since 1999. (It has been estimated that members of Batala who attend the Salvador de Bahia Carnaval bring over £15,000 into the Instituto Oya de Arte e Educacao and the local Salvador economy each year over the course of their stay.)

Batala's long-standing link to Cortejo Afro combined with Gonçalves’ close relationships with numerous influential members of the Bahian music scene have enabled members of Batala to work with and learn from blocos and artists such as Ilê Aiyê, Olodum, Daniela Mercury, Magareth Menezes, Didá Banda Feminina, and the late Neguinho do Samba, who is credited with the development of samba reggae including the shallow drums used specifically in Bahian samba.

== Musical style and costumes ==
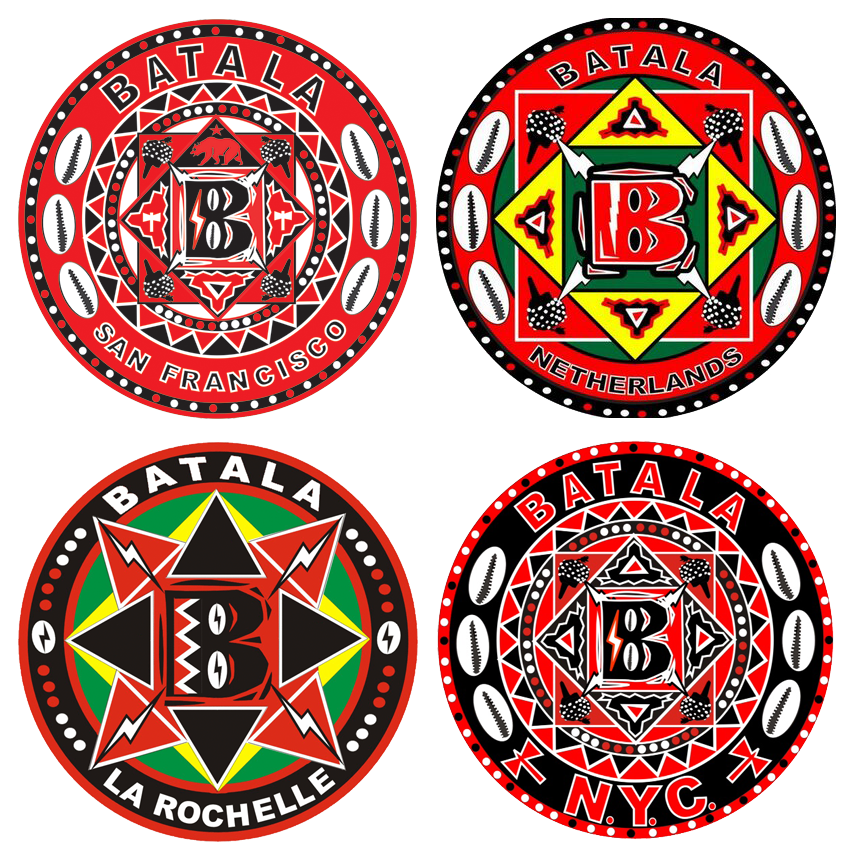
Local variations of the Batala Logo

The international Batala family shares the samba reggae musical arrangements and percussion breaks composed by Gonçalves, as well as graphics, costumes, and choreography. The band's official colours are red, black, and white, but logo variants among the groups as well as drum skins sometimes include green and yellow reflecting the Brazilian national flag.

Batala groups use drums, beaters, belts, T-shirts, and costumes that are designed and manufactured in Salvador de Bahia, Brazil. The costumes, which change every year, are designed and manufactured at Instituto Oya and Fabrica Batala in Salvador de Bahia. Individual groups design and print their own T-shirts for fans and members using the band logo and their own designs.

== Instruments ==
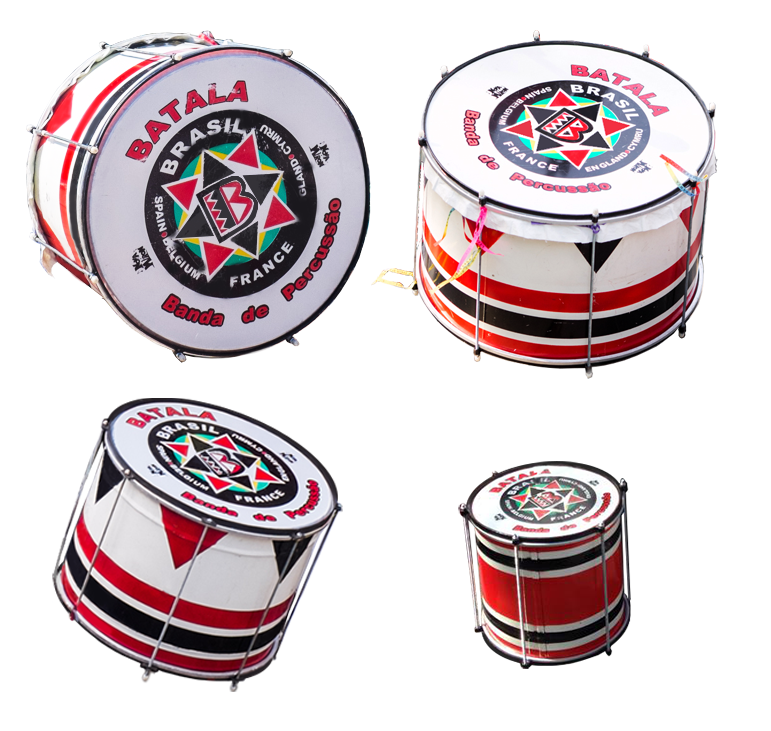
Surdo 1, Surdo 2, Dobra, and Repi drums used by members of Batala.

Batala members play four different drums: Surdos 1 and 2, Surdo 3 (referred to as Dobra), Repinique, and Snare (referred to as Caixa).

The biggest Surdo, called Primero or 1, plays on beats 1 & 3 and sets the tempo for the band. The Surdo 2, called Segundo or Reposta, is slightly smaller and plays on beats 2 and 4. Together these two drums are called Marcaçao - meaning "marking" as in "marking time" - because they mark the beat. Surdo 1 and 2 are worn around the waist and played with large-headed mallets.

The third or "small" Surdo plays the samba reggae "off beat" and other syncopated rhythms. Called the Dobra in Batala, this drum cuts in between the beats of the two larger drums with more complex rhythms and leads the dancing movements in the band. The Dobra is worn around the waist and played with medium-headed beaters.

The Repinique is a much smaller drum with a high-pitched, metallic tone that makes calls to the other drums and cues musical changes during songs. The Repinique is worn low around the waist and played with a pair of flexible plastic sticks.

The final drum, the Caixa, is referred to as the engine of the band because it keeps the music running by maintaining a constant rhythm under the beats of the other drums. It is similar to a common snare drum. The Caixa is worn around the waist and played with a set of standard wooden drum sticks.

== Membership ==
With the exception of the groups in Brasília; Mendoza, Argentina; Washington D.C.; and New York City, which are women-only, worldwide Batala groups are open to individuals of all races, genders, sexualities and religions, regardless of their musical backgrounds or drumming experience. Prospective members generally contact group leaders to find out about rehearsal times and dates in order to join the band. Because all of the groups learn the same tunes, members from different cities often perform with sister groups around the world during the course of any travels they might take, or switch groups if they move cities.

== Former Batalá chapters ==
Band	Country	Year of Formation	Encontro Host	Website
Brussels	Belgium	2002	−	
Liverpool	England	2005	2006	
Porto	Portugal	2006	−	
Tilburg	Netherlands	2010	−	
Sydney	Australia	2010	-	

== See also ==
- Samba Reggae
- Salvador, Bahia
- Olodum
- Ilê Aiyê
- Batala NYC
