= Paul Simon 1964/1993 =

Compilation album by Paul Simon
- Released: September 28, 1993
- Recorded: 1957–1993
- Genre: Rock
- Length: 200:54
- Label: Warner Bros.

Paul Simon chronology
The Paul Simon Anthology (1993)	Paul Simon 1964/1993 (1993)	Songs from The Capeman (1997)

Professional ratings
Review scores
Source	Rating
Allmusic	3/5 stars

Paul Simon 1964/1993 is a compilation album released in 1993 by Paul Simon. It contains a collection of recordings ranging from his earliest collaboration with Art Garfunkel (the 1957 release "Hey, Schoolgirl") and further Simon & Garfunkel hits to songs from his subsequent solo career. Despite carrying the title Paul Simon 1964/1993, the music on this compilation was recorded between 1957 and 1993.

The three-disc box-set was designed and edited by Simon himself and includes only three previously unreleased tracks: "Thelma" (which was left off The Rhythm of the Saints); the original demo version of "Bridge over Troubled Water"; and a live rendition of "Still Crazy After All These Years". Noteworthy omissions from the compilation are "Homeward Bound" and "I Am a Rock".

== Track listing ==
Disc 1

1. "Leaves That Are Green" (2:29)
2. "The Sound of Silence" (3:03)
3. "Kathy's Song" (Live) (3:22)
4. "America" (3:23)
5. "Cecilia" (2:52)
6. "El Condor Pasa (If I Could) (3:05)
7. "The Boxer" (5:08)
8. "Mrs. Robinson" (3:52)
9. "Bridge over Troubled Water" (Demo version) (2:33)
10. "Bridge over Troubled Water" (4:56)
11. "The Breakup" (2:15)
12. "Hey, Schoolgirl" (2:14)
13. "My Little Town" (3:49)
14. "Me and Julio Down by the Schoolyard" (2:44)
15. "Peace Like a River" (3:16)
16. "Mother and Child Reunion" (3:05)
17. "Congratulations" (3:42)
18. "Duncan" (Live) (5:04)
19. "American Tune" (3:45)

Disc 2

1. "Loves Me Like a Rock" (3:19)
2. "Tenderness" (2:52)
3. "Kodachrome" (3:29)
4. "Gone at Last" (3:28)
5. "Take Me to the Mardi Gras" (3:21)
6. "St. Judy's Comet" (3:18)
7. "Something So Right" (4:28)
8. "Still Crazy After All These Years" (Live) (3:49)
9. "Have a Good Time" (3:23)
10. "Jonah" (3:18)
11. "How the Heart Approaches What It Yearns" (2:47)
12. "50 Ways to Leave Your Lover" (3:06)
13. "Slip Slidin' Away" (4:43)
14. "Late in the Evening" (3:54)
15. "Hearts and Bones" (5:38)
16. "Rene And Georgette Magritte with Their Dog after the War" (3:42)
17. "The Late Great Johnny Ace" (4:45)

Disc 3

1. "The Boy in the Bubble" (3:58)
2. "Graceland" (4:48)
3. "Under African Skies" (3:36)
4. "That Was Your Mother" (2:52)
5. "Diamonds on the Soles of Her Shoes" (5:47)
6. "You Can Call Me Al" (4:40)
7. "Homeless" (3:47)
8. "Spirit Voices" (3:55)
9. "The Obvious Child" (4:09)
10. "Can't Run But" (3:34)
11. "Thelma" (4:11)
12. "Further to Fly" (5:32)
13. "She Moves On" (4:56)
14. "Born at the Right Time" (Live) (5:08)
15. "The Cool, Cool River" (Live) (5:44)
16. "The Sound of Silence" (Live) (5:39)

== Certifications ==
Region	Certification	Certified units/sales
United States (RIAA)	Gold	500,000^{^}
^{^} Shipments figures based on certification alone.
