= Tieta of Agreste =

1996 film

Tieta do Agreste
- Film poster
- Directed by: Carlos Diegues
- Written by: Jorge Amado (novel); Carlos Diegues
- Starring: Sônia Braga; Marília Pêra; Chico Anysio; Cláudia Abreu; Zezé Motta; Jece Valadão
- Release date: 30 August 1996
- Running time: 140 minutes
- Country: Brazil
- Language: Portuguese

Tieta of Agreste (Portuguese: Tieta do Agreste) is a 1996 Brazilian comedy film directed by Carlos Diegues. It is based on the novel Tieta by Jorge Amado. The film was selected as the Brazilian entry for the Best Foreign Language Film at the 69th Academy Awards, but was not accepted as a nominee.

== Cast ==
- Sônia Braga as Antonieta "Tieta" Esteves Cantarelli
- Marília Pêra as Perpétua Esteves Batista
  - Anna Cotrim as young Perpétua
- Chico Anysio as Zé Esteves, the Tieta's father
- Cláudia Abreu as Leonora Cantarelli
- Zezé Motta as Carmosina "Carmô"
- Jece Valadão as Commandant Dario
- Harildo Deda as coronel Artur da Tapitanga
- André Valli as Barbozinha
- Heitor Martinez as Ricardo "Cardo" Esteves Batista
- Noélia Marcondes as Tonha
- Patrícia França as Imaculada and young Tieta
- Daniel Filho as Mirko Stephano
- Virginia Rodrigues as singer
- Jorge Amado as narrator
- Leon Góes as Ascânio Trindade

== Soundtrack ==
Tieta do agreste

Soundtrack album by Caetano Veloso
- Released: 1996
- Genre: Soundtrack
- Length: 62:54
- Label: Natasha Records
- Producer: Jaques Morelenbaum

No.	Title	Length
1.	"A luz de Tieta" (Gal Costa, Caetano Veloso, Didá Banda Feminina)	5:56
2.	"Imaculada" (Cristina Braga)	1:14
3.	"O motor da luz" (Gal Costa)	4:51
4.	"Coração-pensamento" (Caetano Veloso)	2:56
5.	"Perpétua e Zé Esteves" (Didá Banda Feminina)	2:39
6.	"Tieta sorri para Perpétua (A Luz de Tieta)" (Márcio Montarroyos)	1:01
7.	"Venha cá" (Gal Costa, Didá Banda Feminina)	2:24
8.	"Ascânio no jeguinho (Coração-pensamento)" (Orquestra de Madeiras)	0:39
9.	"Zé Esteves" (Didá Banda Feminina)	0:56
10.	"Tieta e Ascânio (Coração-pensamento)" (Andrea Ernest Dias, Katia Pierre, Marcelo Martins, Cristina Braga)	3:57
11.	"Coraçãozinho" (Gal Costa, Flora Diegues)	0:55
12.	"Miragem de Carnaval" (Zezé Motta, Didá Banda Feminina)	5:19
13.	"Leonora na janela (Coração-pensamento)" (Jaques Morelenbaum, Cristina Braga)	1:53
14.	"Vento" (Gal Costa, Didá Banda Feminina)	2:59
15.	"Perpétua" (Orquestra de Madeiras)	2:52
16.	"Tieta vê Lucas (Venha cá)"	0:21
17.	"Canto das lavadeiras (O motor da luz)" (Coro das lavadeiras)	2:41
18.	"Construção da casa (Coraçãozinho)" (Oswaldinho do Acordeon, Luiz Brasil, Jaques Morelenbaum and others)	2:15
19.	"O prefeito relembra" (Orquestra de Cordas)	0:27
20.	"Festa (Vento / A luz de Tieta / Coração-pensamento / Miragem de Carnaval)" (Didá Banda Feminina)	4:02
21.	"Cardo vai embora (Imaculada / Vento)" (Caetano Veloso)	3:09
22.	"Tonha e Tieta (Zé Esteves)" (Oswaldinho do Acordeon, Cristina Braga)	1:31
23.	"Final (Vento / Coração-pensamento / O motor da luz)" (Didá Banda Feminina, Sônia Braga)	3:29
24.	"Miragem de Carnaval" (Caetano Veloso)	4:27

== See also ==
- List of submissions to the 69th Academy Awards for Best Foreign Language Film
- List of Brazilian submissions for the Academy Award for Best Foreign Language Film
