= Félix Sabal Lecco =

Félix Sabal Lecco may refer to:

- Félix Sabal Lecco (politician) (1920–2010), teacher, politician and diplomat representing Cameroon
- Félix Sabal Lecco (musician), drummer, son of the politician
