= Meneghel =

Meneghel is an Italian surname. Notable people with the surname include:

- Bruno Meneghel (born 1987), Brazilian footballer
- Germano Meneghel (c. 1962 – 2011), Brazilian musician and singer-songwriter
- Maria da Graça Meneghel (born 1963), stage name Xuxa, Brazilian entertainer
- Antonietta Meneghel (1893 – 1975), stage name Toti Dal Monte, Italian opera singer
