= Banda Didá =

Brazilian all-female percussion band

- Also known as: Didá Banda Feminina, Didá
- Origin: Salvador, Bahia, Brazil
- Genre: Samba-reggae
- Years active: 1993–present

The Didá Educational and Cultural Association (Associação Educativa e Cultural Didá) is a Brazilian cultural institution that maintains Banda Didá (also known as Didá Banda Feminina or simply Didá), an all-female percussion band from Salvador, the capital of the Brazilian state of Bahia. It was founded on 13 December 1993 by the musician Neguinho do Samba, with initial support from the singer Paul Simon. Although it was created by the founder of Olodum, Didá has no ties to that group. Writing in 2018, The New York Times observed that the arrival of Didá changed the traditions of the predominantly male environment of the Salvador carnival.

With roughly eighty members as of 2019, the association also runs social and educational programs promoting gender equality. The name "didá" is a Yoruba word meaning "the power of creation". Only women have access to the group's headquarters and activities, with an exception for boys up to ten years of age; most of its teachers are also women.

Its principal goal is to improve the living conditions of the women and children it serves through a combination of art and education, while also addressing questions of Black identity. Its headquarters occupies a large colonial townhouse on Rua João de Deus in the Pelourinho district.

== Organization and activities ==
The band, whose musical focus is the samba-reggae genre created by its founder, is formally divided into two ensembles: the "Banda Show", made up of eight percussionists, two singers, a drummer, saxophonist, trumpeter, bassist, guitarist, and keyboardist, dedicated to stage performances and touring; and the "Banda Peso", with dozens of members, dedicated to street performances such as Carnival parades and rehearsals.

The band has collaborated with numerous artists, including performing on the trio elétrico of Claudia Leitte and on the DVD Canibália: Ritmos do Brasil by Daniela Mercury, a frequent collaborator. It appeared with Anitta and Cardi B on the song "Me Gusta", performing it at the 2020 edition of the MTV MIAW Brasil awards, and with Marília Mendonça and Léo Santana on the song "Apaixonadinha" from the album Todos os Cantos.

At its headquarters, Didá offers courses in singing, dance, percussion, capoeira, foreign languages, and sewing, and maintains a small shop selling Didá-branded goods. The institution has received occasional corporate support, including from Walmart, but has at times struggled financially to maintain its operations.

== History ==
Antônio Luís Alves de Souza, known as Neguinho do Samba, was troubled by the absence of women in Salvador's percussion scene and had made unsuccessful earlier attempts to bring women into the field, which he attributed to social pressures on the participants, including opposition and violence from partners and family members.

After Neguinho contributed to the success of Paul Simon's 1990 album The Rhythm of the Saints, Simon offered to give him an imported car as a gift. Neguinho refused, telling Simon instead of his wish to create a "headquarters for women" where they could be introduced to his percussion work, and pointed out an old ruined townhouse in Pelourinho. Simon purchased the building, which became the permanent headquarters of Didá, founded as a non-governmental organization that gave rise to the band. Once the three-story building was renovated, Neguinho was able to realize his project. The New York Times described his vision as a long-term one: an all-female percussion group sustained by free instrument-making workshops and music classes for local women and children.

The band made its first public appearance during the 1994 Lavagem do Bonfim festival, performing at the Mercado Modelo, where it was met with curiosity, surprise, admiration, and some prejudiced commentary. The debut marked a milestone in the history of women in Bahian percussion. In Adriana Portela, the group also had the first woman to conduct a bloco afro in the history of Salvador. Portela, who has been with the group since its formation and helped Neguinho conceive it, recalled that the band initially borrowed its instruments from Olodum, and that the project faced hostility from the start, with critics telling Neguinho that working with women would only bring trouble. In 1997 the group made its national debut accompanying a tour by Caetano Veloso, Gilberto Gil, and Gal Costa.

At the closing ceremony of the 2014 FIFA World Cup, the band performed alongside Shakira and Carlinhos Brown. During the Brazilian television broadcast of the Brazil–Jamaica match at the 2019 FIFA Women's World Cup, a commentator, unaware of the group's history, referred to them as a "female Olodum"; the group's director and public relations officer, Viviam Caroline de Jesus Queirós, responded by stressing the group's complete independence and describing Didá as a social project that had been fostering women's empowerment for 25 years. Queirós, Neguinho do Samba's widow, said on another occasion that keeping the project alive after his death had been the group's greatest challenge. Neguinho's eldest daughter, Débora Souza, who presides over the association and has taken part since its founding, said in 2021 that the comparison to Olodum made the group's members feel undervalued, emphasizing that Didá has its own history distinct from that of the group her father co-founded.

In 2011, when Didá performed with Claudia Leitte's trio elétrico, one of the group's singers, Carla Lis, spoke of the band as the place where she discovered her relationship with Black music; she had been nominated in 2010 for the Troféu Dodô e Osmar as best bloco afro singer, and trained in singing, dance, and percussion to perform with Didá.

In December 2019, the band held a concert celebrating its 26th anniversary featuring Bahian music stars Margareth Menezes and Saulo Fernandes, and adopted the theme "Mãe Natureza Guerreira. Natureza Mãe Mulher" ("Warrior Mother Nature, Nature Mother Woman") for the 2020 Carnival.
