= Adolphe Moudiki =

Cameroonian political figure (born 1938)

Director-General of the Société nationale des hydrocarbures
- Incumbent
- Assumed office 1993
- Preceded by: Jean Assoumou

Minister of Justice of Cameroon
- In office 13 April 1989 – 26 April 1991
- Succeeded by: Douala Moutomé

Director of the Civil Cabinet of the Presidency
- In office 16 May 1988 – 13 April 1989

Minister of Labour and Social Insurance
- In office 23 January 1987 – 16 May 1988

Personal details
- Born: 10 December 1938 (age 87) Yaoundé, Cameroon
- Occupation: Politician

Adolphe Moudiki (born 10 December 1938) is a Cameroonian political figure who has been Director-General of the National Hydrocarbons Company (Société nationale des hydrocarbures, SNH), the state oil company of Cameroon, since 1993. A long-time associate of President Paul Biya, Moudiki was Minister of Labor from 1987 to 1988, Director of the Civil Cabinet of the Presidency from 1988 to 1989, and Minister of Justice from 1989 to 1991.

== Political career ==
Born in Yaoundé, Moudiki studied law and was vice-president of the Yaoundé Court of Appeals from February 1968 to August 1970. He worked as deputy director of Legislation at the Ministry of Justice from November 1972 to March 1973, as Attorney-General at the Garoua Court of Appeals from March 1973 to April 1974, and as Attorney-General at the Douala Court of Appeals from April 1974 to 1975. Afterward Moudiki worked under Prime Minister Paul Biya; he was appointed Technical Adviser to the Prime Minister's Office in 1975 and was Secretary-General of the Prime Minister's Office from 1976 to 1982.

Prime Minister Biya succeeded Ahmadou Ahidjo as President of Cameroon in November 1982 and promptly instituted an administrative reshuffle that affected Moudiki. In his fourth and fifth presidential decrees, Biya moved Moudiki out of the Prime Minister's Office and into the Presidency, assigning him the new post of Technical Adviser to the Presidency. However, Moudiki only remained in that post until December 1982; he then served as Director-General of the Cameroon Railways Authority (Régie des chemins de fer du Cameroun, commonly known as Regifercam) from 1982 to 1987.

Moudiki was first appointed to the government of Cameroon as Minister of Labor and Social Insurance on 23 January 1987. He was instead appointed Director of the Civil Cabinet of the Presidency of the Republic on 16 May 1988 and then as Minister of Justice on 13 April 1989.

In a 1990 address to judicial court presidents, Moudiki called for greater leniency in sentencing. He said that it was important to strictly respect the rights of individuals and suggested that prison sentences were being applied too broadly, pointing to the serious problem of overcrowded conditions at prisons. After two years as Minister of Justice, he was dismissed from the government on 26 April 1991, when Douala Moutomé was appointed to replace him at the Justice Ministry.

== Director-General of the SNH ==
In early 1993, following the death of Jean Assoumou, President Biya appointed Moudiki as Director-General of the SNH. The appointment of Moudiki, one of Biya's long-time associates, to head the SNH was a clear example of Biya's practice of maintaining a firm grip on the oil sector. Later in 1993, Moudiki announced plans for "a new management lineup and a re-energising programme" at the SNH in 1993–1994. A lack of transparency associated with the oil industry in Cameroon is said to have continued during Moudiki's tenure at the SNH.

As Director-General of the SNH, Moudiki represents Cameroon on the Council of Ministers of the African Petroleum Producers Association (Association des producteurs de pétrole africains, APPA). He was President-in-Office of APPA from June 2007 until Jean-Baptiste Tati Loutard, Congo-Brazzaville's Minister of State for Hydrocarbons, was elected to succeed him on 25–28 March 2008.
