= Claude Jeter =

American singer (1914–2009)

Claude A. Jeter (October 26, 1914 – January 6, 2009) was an American gospel music singer. Originally a coal miner from Kentucky, Jeter formed the group that would eventually become one of the most popular gospel quartets of the post-war era – the Swan Silvertones. He was also, at one time, a member of the Dixie Hummingbirds.

== Early life ==
Jeter was born in Montgomery, Alabama on October 26, 1914. Jeter's father died when he was eight-years-old and he moved to Kentucky with his family, where he later found work in the coal mines in West Virginia as a teenager.

== Career ==
=== Swan Silvertones ===
He formed the Four Harmony Kings in 1938 with his brother and two fellow coal miners, which was later renamed as the Silvertone Singers. After the group was hired by a radio program based in Knoxville, Tennessee that was sponsored by the local Swan Bakery, they were renamed as the Swan Silvertones.

Jeter was best known for his falsetto with the Swan Silvertones in which his graceful high melodies served in contrast to the rougher voices of the group's other members. The group recorded for several different labels, but never achieved financial success, despite its widespread influence.

During the 1950s the group was popular and many of the elements of the group's style resembled the then-prevalent rhythm and blues vocal group style. Jeter received many offers to perform R&B or rock and roll, but rejected them all, citing a commitment he had made to his mother that he would always sing for the Lord.

=== Influence on other singers ===
Elements of his performances in songs such as "Careless Soul" and "Saviour Pass Me Not" were picked up by later singers such as Al Green and Eddie Kendricks of The Temptations. "I'll be your bridge over deep water if you trust in my name", a line from his 1959 rendition of the Negro spiritual "Mary Don't You Weep" served as Paul Simon's inspiration to write his 1970 song "Bridge over Troubled Water". Jeter said that the line had been based on a paraphrase of a Biblical verse.

Paul Simon hired Jeter to sing on the 1973 studio album There Goes Rhymin' Simon - specifically the falsetto background vocal on "Loves Me Like a Rock" and Take Me to the Mardi Gras- and gave Jeter a check for $1,000 for inspiring Simon to write "Bridge over Troubled Water".

=== Solo album ===
In 1971, Anthony Heilbut wrote the book The Gospel Sound: Good News and Hard Times, and later produced Yesterday and Today, a 1991 album that was Jeter's only solo project.

== Later life ==
Jeter lived in New York's Harlem neighborhood at 202 W. 118th St., just to the east of the Cecil Hotel. When a fire under his apartment made it unsafe to live there he was moved to Northern Manhattan Nursing and Rehabilitation Center on E. 125th Street. Despite his lack of mobility, he attended local gospel programs at Lagree Baptist Church and First Corinthian Baptist Church with the assistance of a friend, musician Spencer Jarrett. The two traveled to Birmingham, Alabama, in 2005 where Reverend Jeter received a lifetime achievement award from Rev. George W. Stewart and the American Gospel Quartet Convention. During his final years in Harlem Rev. Jeter would continue to be visited by longtime friends including Anthony Heilbut, the promoter and radio personality Virginia Cotton, Deacon John Faison of the Fantastic Soulernaires, Ira Tucker and the Dixie Hummingbirds, Paul Simon, and others.

== Death and legacy ==
Jeter died at age 94 on January 6, 2009, at the Daughters of Jacob Nursing Home in the Bronx.

In May 2009, Jerry Lawson (former lead singer of The Persuasions) and singer/songwriter James Power released a tribute to Jeter entitled "The Man in Room 1009". The song pays homage to Jeter's musical contribution and legacy using his final home (Room 1009 at the Daughters of Jacob Nursing Home in the Bronx) as the song's setting.

== Discography ==
Albums

- What Is This (1970)
- Singing In My Soul (1972)
- The Little Wooden Church On The Hill (1975)
- Mary Don't You Weep (1976)
- The Greatest Hits of Reverend Claude Jeter (1977)
- Our Greatest Hits (1977) with Evangelist Shirley Caesar
- Swan Silvertones Featuring Reverend Claude Jeter - Our Greatest Hits (1977)
- Yesterday And Today (1988)
- I Thank You Lord (unknown)
- Inspirations! (unknown) with Shirley Caesar

Singles

- Mary Don't You Weep (unknown) with Shirley Caesar and The Caesar Singers
- In Memory Of Dr. Martin Luther King / When I've Gone The Last Mile Of The Way (unknown)
- Only Believe / Christmas In Heaven (unknown)
