= Ministry of Justice of Cameroon =

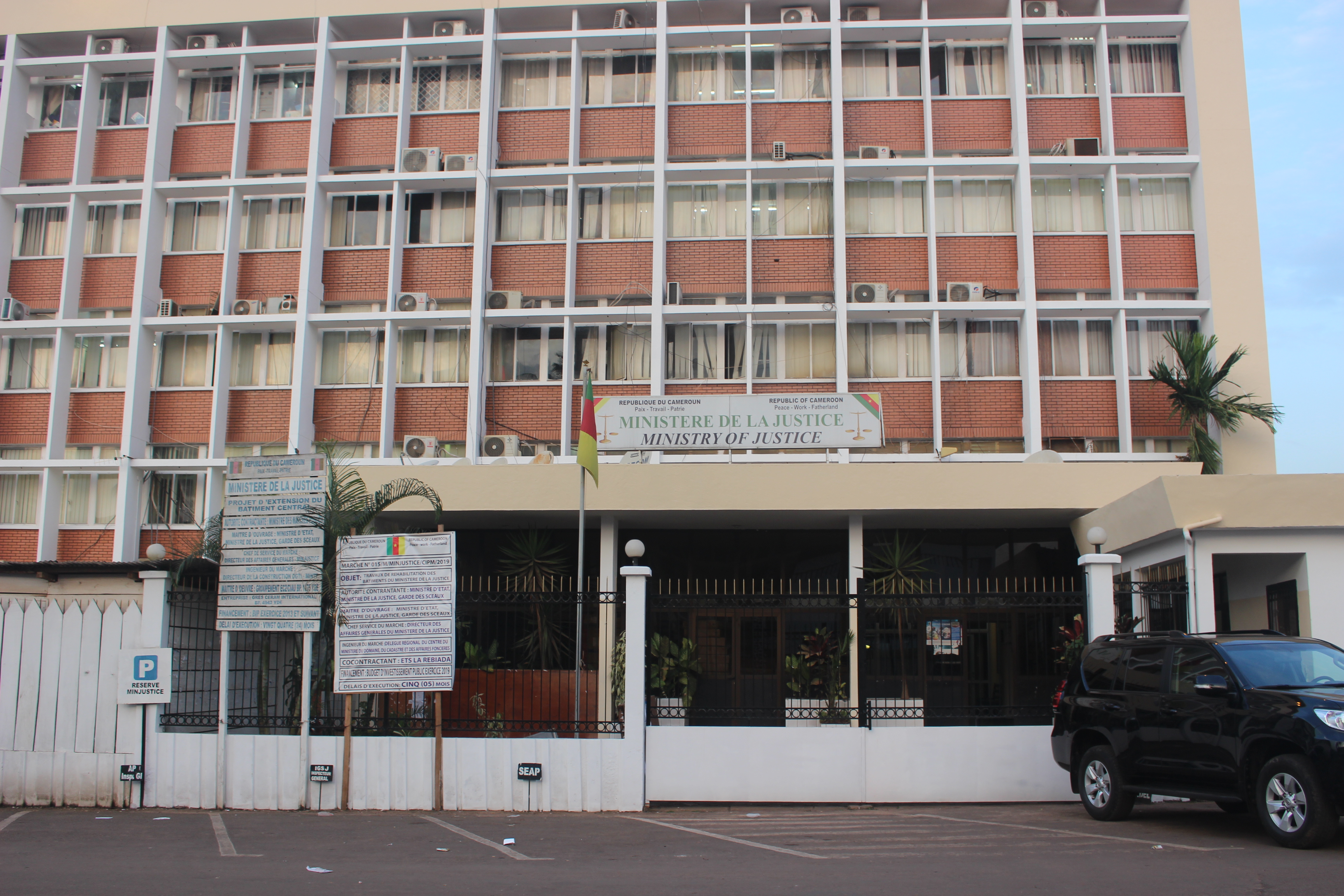
The ministry in Yaoundé

The Ministry of Justice of Cameroon is the Department responsible for administering the Cameroon justice system. As of May 2004, the Minister of State for Justice was Amadou Ali. The legal system in the Cameroon is complex with a constitution developed in 1972 and revised in 1996 as well as elements of the Code Napoleon, Common Law and customary law. In early 2005, the Ministry of Justice became responsible for administering the prison system due to unrest in the prisons. The Ministry of Justice also has a shared responsibility for administering human rights in the Cameroon. There have been serious allegations about use of torture by police and military officials in the Cameroon.

== Administration of Justice ==
The Constitution of Cameroon provides that the Supreme Court of Cameroon is the highest court existing in the country. In addition, the country has appeal courts, circuit courts and magistrates courts. The Supreme Court is located in Yaoundé as is the Cameroon High Court of Justice consisting of nine titular judges and six surrogate judges and the Constitutional Council of Cameroon, consisting of eleven Judges with three nominated by the President of Cameroon, three nominated by the President of the Senate, three others nominated by the Speaker of the National Assembly and two by the Higher Judicial Council. All of these nominations are forwarded to the President of the republic who appoints them by decree. Other courts are located throughout the country.

The constitution provides for a Constitutional Council responsible for ensuring the Constitutionality of laws. The Supreme Court carried out this duty before its creation in 2018. Cameroon claims that the judiciary is independent from the executive and the legislature. However, the US State Department claims that the judiciary is subordinate to the Ministry of Justice and that the Supreme Court can only consider a constitutional matter when referred to it by the President of Cameroon, 1/3 of the Members of the Cameroonian National Assembly or 1/3 of the Members of the Senate of Cameroon. The Supreme Court is responsible for adjudicating disputes between the president and the National Assembly.

The President of the Cameroon in his capacity as President of the Higher Judicial Council of Cameroon is responsible for appointing judges and also has the power to dismiss them. The Higher Judicial Council of Cameroon advises him on the nomination of judges and magistrates and has responsibility for judicial discipline.

The Parliamentary Court of Justice is responsible for judging acts by the President in cases where he or she has been accused of high treason. This Court also has responsibility for judging acts by the Prime Minister of the Cameroon, other members of the Government and other senior officials in cases relevant to state security.

== Legal traditions ==
Prior to independence, jurisdiction over Cameroon was shared between the United Kingdom and France under a League of Nations mandate issued in 1919. The northern part of the British area became part of Nigeria while the Christian southern part joined with the French area. As a consequence, the country inherited a dual legal system including parts of the Code Napoleon and the common law. However, on 12 July 2005 the National Assembly (Assemblé Nationale) approved a law to harmonize the country's criminal procedure code.

In addition, traditional courts still play a significant role in domestic, property and probate. The court system honours tribal laws and customs when these do not conflict with national laws.

== Prison system ==
The Ministry of Justice became responsible for administering the prison system at the beginning of 2005 taking over responsibility from the Ministry of Territorial Administration of Cameroon. This follows disturbances caused by overcrowding of prisons and long stays in detention without charges of prisons.

There were 15,903 people in the prison system as of 1997 representing 115 per 100,000 population. However, the population of the prisons has grown rapidly in recent years. The New Bell prison in Douala was meant to hold 800 inmates but holds 3,100. The International Centre for Prison Studies estimates that Cameroon has the second highest occupancy rate in the world after Barbados with approximately half awaiting trial.

The Government has built two new prisons but has not provided enough staff resulting in the establishment of "anti-gangs" of inmates to preserve order.

== Human rights ==
The preamble of the constitution adopted in 1996 incorporates parts of the Universal Declaration of Human Rights and the African Charter on Human and Peoples' Rights. The Ministry of Justice shares responsibility for administering human rights with the Ministry of Territorial Administration.

A person who considers that their rights may have been violated may take their case either to the statutory courts or to the traditional courts. They may also petition the National Committee on Human Rights and Freedoms established in 1990. They may also seek compensation through the courts. If a person is acquitted, discharged or has been wrongfully held in custody, they are not entitled to compensation unless they can prove that the judge was wrong or the system did not function properly.

The United Nations Commission on Human Rights held hearings in 2003 into allegations of torture by the police and the military. The major area of concern was the prison network although it has been acknowledged that Cameroon had made some progress in improving its human rights performance.

== List of ministers ==
- Charles Okala (1959-1960)
- Victor Kanga (1960-1961)
- Emmanuel Egbe Tabi (1961-1968), co-minister
- Mohaman Lamine (1961), co-minister
- Arouna Njoya (1961-1965)
- Sanda Oumarou (1965-1971)
- Félix Sabal Lecco (1971-1972)
- Simon Achidi Achu (1972-1975)
- Joseph Charles Doumba (1975-1979)
- Gilbert Andze Tchoungui (1979-1983)
- André Ngongang Ouandji (1983-1985)
- Benjamin Itoe (1985-1989)
- Adolphe Moudiki (1989-1991)
- Kuntz Douala Moutome (1991-1996)
- Laurent Esso (1996-2000)
- Robert Mbella Mbappe (2000-2001)
- Amadou Ali (2001-2011)
- Laurent Esso (2011–present)
