= Batala NYC =

Batala NYC was a New York-based all-women, percussion ensemble, playing Batala music. It later developed into two groups; Batalá New York, whose music and costumes are primarily from Salvador da Bahia in Brazil, and Fogo Azul NYC, a Samba Reggae marching band.

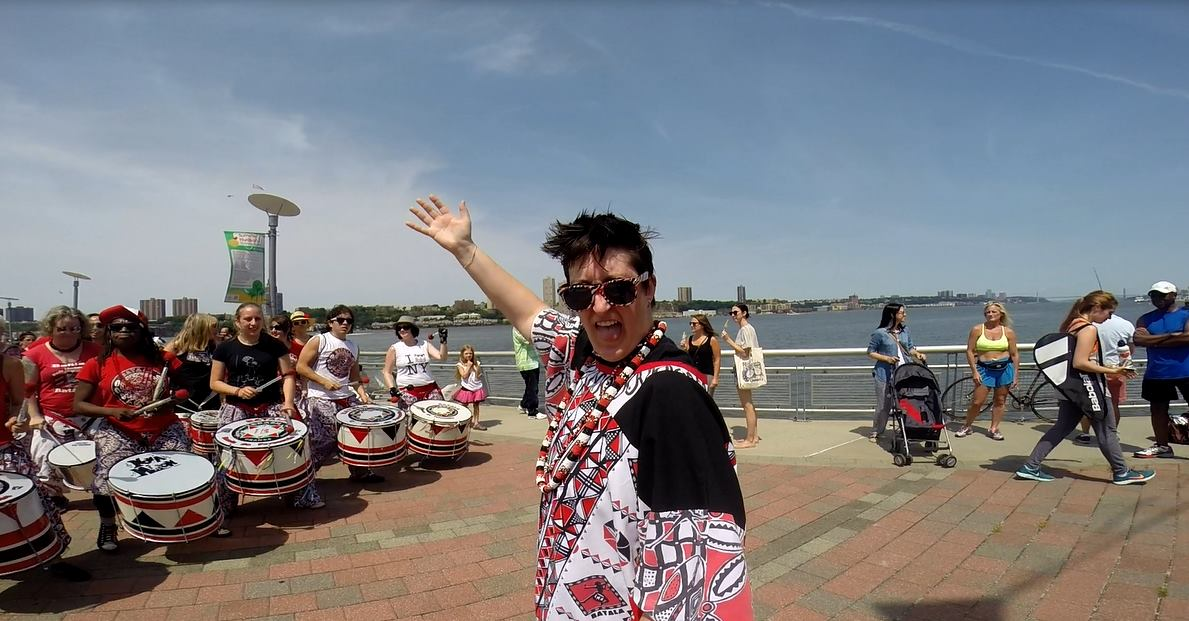

== History ==
Founder and Artistic Director Stacy Kovacs first encountered members of Batalá Mundo performing in the 2011 Brazil Day celebration in New York City while she was performing with Manhattan Samba. Following this introduction to Batalá and a desire to form her own drumming band, Kovacs traveled to Brazil in 2012 for that year's Carnaval in Salvador da Bahia with Bloco Afro Cortejo Afro. Kovacs brought back 35 drums, and Batalá NYC had their first rehearsal in March 2012. Batala NYC (there was no accent on the last "a" in Kovacs' Batala band) proceeded to grow to 90+ members over a 4.5 year period performing in over 100 events per year in the greater New York City area.

Batalá NYC dissolved in July, 2016. Most of its members then created Batalá New York, a continuation of the original band: an all-female, female-led banda de percussão (percussion-based band) that promotes Afro-Brazilian culture and women's empowerment. Batalá New York plays from the same repertoire of northeastern Brazilian songs that Batalá NYC was assigned to play by their Mestre, Giba Goncalves.

Fogo Azul NYC Drumline at NYC Dyke March 2022

Kovacs, together with 17 members of the original Batalá NYC, founded a new musical entity named Fogo Azul NYC, and joining the Marcus Santos' music education network Grooversity. Fogo Azul NYC now has 125 women, transgender, and non-binary drummers who are there to drum and enjoy the music of Grooversity and Brazil. The band takes individuals of all musical levels, and teaches them to drum. Fogo Azul means Blue Fire in Portuguese.

== Performances ==
Batalá NYC performed with notable acts such as The Rolling Stones, participated in many events including New York's Village Halloween Parade, and took part in benefit concerts for One Billion Rising. The band was also featured on the cover of Issue 11 of Tom Tom Magazine.

In 2024, Batalá New York runs weekend events throughout the city. Fogo Azul NYC takes bookings for events.
