= Raid on Kolofata (2014) =

- Part of Boko Haram insurgency
Date	July 27, 2014
Location	Kolofata, Far North Region, Cameroon
Result	Boko Haram victory: Boko Haram able to leave with hostages; Cameroonian Army retains control of Kolofata

Belligerents
Cameroon	Boko Haram

Strength
Unknown	200

Casualties and losses
3 killed	9 killed
- 4+ civilians killed 17+ civilians taken hostage

On July 27, 2014, militants from Boko Haram attacked the town of Kolofata, Cameroon, targeting important local and federal government officials. At least four civilians were killed and seventeen were taken prisoner.

== Background ==
Boko Haram emerged in 2009 as a jihadist social and political movement in a failed rebellion in northeast Nigeria. Throughout the following years, Abubakar Shekau unified militant Islamist groups in the region and continued to foment the rebellion against the Nigerian government, conducting terrorist attacks and bombings in cities and communities across the region. Since the start of 2014, the group had carried out 40 attacks leaving 700 people dead.

The group, since 2011, has expanded into the Lake Chad basin in Cameroon and Chad, with the first attacks in Cameroonian territory beginning in March 2014. The jihadists targeted the Far North Region, a historically impoverished and neglected region. In late May, the Cameroonian government deployed 3,000 troops to the far north to protect against Boko Haram incursions. In early June, Boko Haram attacked the town of Gorsi Tourou, displacing thousands of civilians.

== Raid ==
At around 5am local time, two groups of Boko Haram militants attacked the town of Kolofata, targeting the palace of Sultan of Kolofata Seiny Boukar Lamine and against the house of Deputy Prime Minister Amadou Ali. The militants entered Kolofata wearing Cameroonian Army uniforms, and their vehicles had been painted with Cameroonian government regalia to mimic official vehicles.

In the attack on the Sultan's palace, the militants killed four people, including the Sultan's brother. Sultan Lamine was captured along with his wife and five children. The attack on Ali's residence cost the lives of two gendarmes, with several others taken prisoner including Ali's wife, the mayor of Kolofata, and his wife and two daughters. The jihadists also arrived at a hospital where they knew two Western women worked, but this was in vain as the women were on vacation.

Government spokesman Issa Tchiroma said that over 200 fighters took part in the battle. The Cameroonian army deployed soldiers from the elite Rapid Intervention Battalion (BIR) to Kolofata, and the air force conducted bombing raids nearby.

Cameroonian officials said that 16 people were killed in the raid. A gendarme told AFP that two gendarmes and a BIR soldier were among those killed. The militants were able to withdraw from Kolofata, taking around 20 prisoners.

== Aftermath ==
Following the raid, President Paul Biya sanctioned and replaced several senior officers and expanded the army's presence in Far North Region. The hostages were released by Boko Haram on October 11.
