= Another World (John Patitucci album) =

Studio album by John Patitucci
- Released: 1993
- Genre: Jazz
- Length: 52:07
- Label: GRP
- Producer: John Patitucci

John Patitucci chronology
Heart of the Bass (1992)	Another World (1993)	Mistura Fina (1995)

Professional ratings
Review scores
Source	Rating
Allmusic	4/5 stars

Another World is the fifth album by American jazz bassist John Patitucci. It was released in 1993.

== Track listing ==
All tracks are written by John Patitucci except where noted.

No.	Title	Writer(s)	Length
1.	"Ivory Coast, Part I"		1:20
2.	"Ivory Coast, Part II"		4:50
3.	"Another World"	Patitucci, Armand Sabal-Lecco	4:56
4.	"My Summer Vacation"	John Beasley	5:33
5.	"Soho Steel"		3:49
6.	"I Saw You"		4:25
7.	"Hold That Thought"	Patitucci, Jeff Beal	4:53
8.	"Norwegian Sun"		3:58
9.	"The Griot"	Sabal-Lecco	4:05
10.	"Showtime"	Sabal-Lecco	3:30
11.	"Peace Prayer"		3:18
12.	"Shanachie"	Beal	4:57
13.	"Until Then"		2:33

== Personnel ==
- John Patitucci – double bass, synthesizer, backing vocals
- Jeff Beal – trumpet, keyboards, programming
- Michael Brecker – tenor saxophone
- Steve Tavaglione – tenor saxophone, EWI
- Armand Sabal-Lecco – bass, piccolo bass, tenor bass, backing vocals
- John Beasley – keyboards, percussion, programming, backing vocals
- Andy Narell – steel pan
- Alex Acuña – African drums, percussion, backing vocals,
- William Kennedy – drums, percussion, backing vocals
- Dave Weckl – drums, percussion
- Luis Conte – percussion, backing vocals

Production

- Dave Grusin – producer
- Larry Rosen – producer
- Bernie Kirsh – engineer, mixing
- Darren Mora – assistant engineer
- Robert Read – assistant engineer
- Larry Mah – assistant engineer
- Bernie Grundman – mastering
- Joseph Doughney – mastering
- Michael Landy – mastering
- Adam Zelinka – mastering
