= Take Me to the Mardi Gras =

Single by Paul Simon

from the album There Goes Rhymin' Simon
- B-side: "Something So Right"
- Released: 1973
- Recorded: 1972
- Studio: Muscle Shoals Sound Studio, Muscle Shoals, Alabama
- Genre: Pop rock; Dixieland
- Length: 3:31
- Label: Columbia
- Songwriter: Paul Simon
- Producers: Paul Simon; Muscle Shoals Rhythm Section

Paul Simon singles chronology
"American Tune" (1973)	"Take Me to the Mardi Gras" (1973)	"The Sound of Silence (Live)" (1974)

Official audio
- "Take Me to the Mardi Gras" on YouTube

"Take Me to the Mardi Gras" is a song by the American singer-songwriter Paul Simon. It was the fourth single from his third studio album, There Goes Rhymin' Simon (1973), released on Columbia Records.

Smooth jazz keyboardist Bob James made an instrumental cover of the song for his 1975 album Two, whose intro has since become a widely recognized drum break.

== Chart performance ==
The song only charted in the United Kingdom. It debuted on the UK Singles Chart on June 10, 1973, at number 36, rising over several weeks to a peak of number seven on July 8. In total, it spent eleven weeks on the chart. It is usually missing from UK hits compilations in favour of "Kodachrome", which was the flip side to this. "Kodachrome" was the A-side in the US, but the BBC would not play it in the UK because of its policy against advertising or product names in song titles.

== Personnel ==
- Paul Simon – vocals, acoustic guitar
- Jimmy Johnson, Pete Carr – electric guitars
- David Hood – bass guitar
- Roger Hawkins – drums
- Barry Beckett – Wurlitzer electronic piano, Hammond organ
- The Onward Brass Band – brass
- Rev. Claude Jeter – bridge vocals

== Charts ==
Chart (1973)	Peak position
South Africa Top 20 (Springbok/Radio Orion)	1
UK Singles (OCC)	7
Zimbabwe (ZIMA)	3
