= Félix Sabal Lecco (musician) =

Cameroonian drummer (1959–2024)

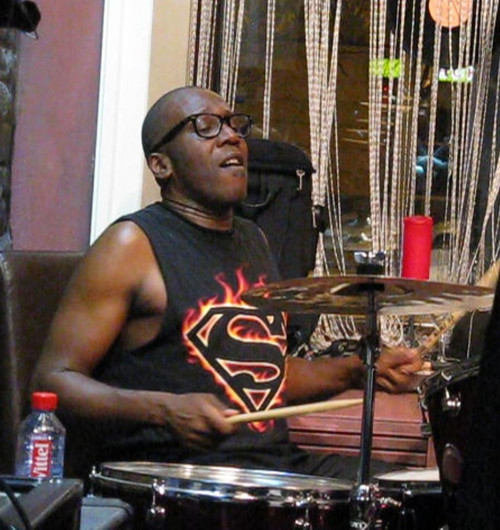
- Sabal Lecco in 2010

Background information
- Born: 1959; Yaoundé, French Cameroon
- Origin: Cameroon
- Died: 3 March 2024 (aged 64–65); Paris, France
- Occupation: Musician
- Instrument: Drums
- Years active: 1988–2024

Félix Sabal Lecco (1959 – 3 March 2024) was a Cameroonian drummer.

== Early life and background ==
Born in Yaoundé in 1959, Sabal Lecco came from a diplomatic family. His father, Félix Sabal Lecco, was a minister in the government of Ahmadou Ahidjo, and was later appointed ambassador to Italy and France.

== Career ==
Sabal Lecco played with world-famous musicians such as Jeff Beck, Prince, Peter Gabriel, Herbie Hancock, Snoop Dogg, Janet Jackson, Lenny Kravitz, Shawn Lane, Jonas Hellborg, with African artists such as Youssou Ndour, Salif Keita and Manu Dibango, with the Celtic musician Alan Stivell, to name a few. He was featured as a drummer on The Rhythm of the Saints, the eighth studio album of Paul Simon, released in 1990. His brother, Armand Sabal-Lecco, played the bass on this album.

Félix Sabal Lecco taught at the Conservatoire d'Amiens. He also tried a career in acting, with Tismée by Bruno Fougnies.

== Death ==
Félix Sabal-Lecco died in Paris, on the night of 3 March 2024.

== Discography ==
Albums on which Félix Sabal Lecco performed include:

Date	Album	Format	Label	Notes
1988	La Fête A Manu		Buda Musique	
1989	Négropolitaines Vol 1	LP	Soul Paris Records	
1990	Paul Simon - The Rhythm Of The Saints		Warner Bros. Records, Columbia House	Track: Born At The Right Time
1992	Manu Dibango Featuring MC Mell 'O		Bellaphon	
1994	Wakafrika	CD, Album	Giant Records	
1995	Dance With Manu Dibango	CD, Album	Solo	
2005	Everybody	CD, Maxi	Universal Licensing Music (ULM)	
2006	Ministry of Sound - The Annual 2006	2xCD	Universal Music (México)	Track: Everybody
2007	Tout Ira Bien	CD, Album	Sketis Music, Veronika Bulycheva	
2010	The Essential Paul Simon	2xCD, Comp	Sony Music, Legacy	
	Mauvais Chasseur	LP	Kanibal Records	

== Filmography ==
Sabal Lecco's music was featured on several documentaries:

- 2004 The Enigma of the Black Caiman (TV documentary)
- 2006 Au commencement était la vase (TV documentary)
- 2007 Voyage en eau trouble (documentary)
- 2007 Nyaman' gouacou (Viande de ta mère) (short)
