= There Goes Rhymin' Simon =

Studio album by Paul Simon
- Released: May 5, 1973
- Recorded: September 1972 – January 1973
- Studios: Columbia Studios, New York City, A&R Recording, New York City, Malaco Recording Studios, Jackson, Mississippi, Muscle Shoals Sound Studio, Sheffield, Alabama; Morgan Studios, London
- Genre: Pop rock
- Length: 35:19
- Labels: Columbia, Warner Bros.
- Producers: Paul Simon, Phil Ramone, Muscle Shoals Rhythm Section, Paul Samwell-Smith, Roy Halee

Paul Simon chronology
Paul Simon (1972)	There Goes Rhymin' Simon (1973)	Paul Simon in Concert: Live Rhymin' (1974)

Singles from There Goes Rhymin' Simon
- 1. "Kodachrome" Released: May 1973; 2. "Loves Me Like a Rock" Released: July 17, 1973; 3. "American Tune" Released: November 8, 1973; 4. "Take Me to the Mardi Gras" Released: 1973; 5. "Something So Right" Released: 1973; 6. "St. Judy's Comet" Released: 1973

There Goes Rhymin' Simon is the third solo studio album by American musician Paul Simon, released in May 1973. It contains songs spanning several styles and genres, such as gospel ("Loves Me Like a Rock") and Dixieland ("Take Me to the Mardi Gras"). It received two nominations at the Grammy Awards of 1974, which were for Best Pop Vocal Performance, Male and Album of the Year.

As foreshadowed by the lead single "Kodachrome" (which reached No. 2 on the Billboard charts, behind Billy Preston's "Will It Go Round in Circles"), There Goes Rhymin' Simon was a bigger hit than its predecessor in the US, reaching No. 2 on the Billboard 200 chart (behind George Harrison's Living in the Material World) and No. 1 on Cashbox for one week from June 30, 1973. In the United Kingdom, the album peaked at No. 4. Subsequent singles were also the No. 2 single "Loves Me Like a Rock" (kept out of the top spot by Cher's "Half-Breed" but reaching No. 1 on Cashbox on September 29, 1973) and the Top 40 hit "American Tune". Also, "Take Me to the Mardi Gras" was released in the UK, reaching the Top 10.

The song "Kodachrome" is named after the Kodak photographic film of the same name. Kodak required the album to note that Kodachrome is a trademark. The song was not released as a single in the UK, where it could not be played on BBC radio due to its trademarked name, but appeared as the B-side to "Take Me to the Mardi Gras" there.

== Reception ==
Retrospective professional ratings
Review scores
Source	Rating
AllMusic	5/5 stars
Blender	4/5 stars
Chicago Tribune	4/4 stars
Christgau's Record Guide	B+
The Encyclopedia of Popular Music	5/5 stars
Entertainment Weekly	A−
The Guardian	5/5 stars
Record Collector	5/5 stars
The Rolling Stone Album Guide	4/5 stars
Uncut	5/5 stars

Critics praised the album. The Denver Post's Jared Johnson called it "a brilliantly executed masterpiece, and surely the finest album in three years", citing such 1970 releases as Bridge Over Troubled Water and After the Gold Rush. Robert Hilburn of the Los Angeles Times said, "Combining a variety of musical textures (from a touch of gospel to an infectious trace of Jamaican rhythm to a hint of the old Simon and Garfunkel grandeur), Simon's new album firmly establishes him as one of our most valuable and accessible artists." Stephen Holden of Rolling Stone praised the album as "a rich and moving song cycle, one in which each cut reflects on every other to create an ever-widening series of refractions."

However, Stereo Review's Noel Coppage, while giving the album an "excellent" rating, nonetheless felt that it was "deficient in spontaneity, excitement, strain", calling its arrangements "clean and sensible" but "oddly predictable".

In 2003, the album was ranked number 267 on Rolling Stone magazine's list of the 500 greatest albums of all time.

In 2000 it was voted number 421 in Colin Larkin's All Time Top 1000 Albums.

== Track listing ==
All tracks written by Paul Simon.

Side one
No.	Title	Length
1.	"Kodachrome"	3:32
2.	"Tenderness"	2:53
3.	"Take Me to the Mardi Gras"	3:27
4.	"Something So Right"	4:33
5.	"One Man's Ceiling Is Another Man's Floor"	3:46
Total length:		18:11

Side two
No.	Title	Length
6.	"American Tune"	3:43
7.	"Was a Sunny Day"	3:41
8.	"Learn How to Fall"	2:44
9.	"St. Judy's Comet"	3:19
10.	"Loves Me Like a Rock"	3:31
Total length:		16:58 35:09

2004 remastered reissue bonus tracks
No.	Title	Length
11.	"Let Me Live in Your City" (work in progress)	4:21
12.	"Take Me to the Mardi Gras" (acoustic demo)	2:31
13.	"American Tune" (unfinished demo)	4:03
14.	"Loves Me Like a Rock" (acoustic demo)	3:24
Total length:		14:19 49:28

== Personnel ==
- Paul Simon – vocals, acoustic guitar (1, 3, 4, 6–10)
- Barry Beckett – keyboards (1, 3, 9), acoustic piano (5), vibraphone (9)
- Paul Griffin – acoustic piano (2)
- Bob James – keyboards (4, 6)
- Bobby Scott – acoustic piano (4)
- Carson Whitsett – Hammond organ (8)
- Pete Carr – acoustic guitar (1), electric guitar (3, 5, 9)
- Jimmy Johnson – electric guitar (1, 3)
- Cornell Dupree – electric guitar (2)
- Al Gafa – guitar (4)
- David Spinozza – guitar (4)
- Jerry Puckett – electric guitar (8)
- David Hood – bass guitar (1, 3, 5, 9, 10)
- Gordon Edwards – bass guitar (2)
- Bob Cranshaw – bass guitar (4, 6, 7)
- Richard Davis – double bass (4)
- Verne Robbins – bass guitar (8)
- Roger Hawkins – drums (1, 3, 5, 10), percussion (9)
- Rick Marotta – drums (2)
- James Stroud – drums (8)
- Grady Tate – drums (4, 6)
- Don Elliott – vibraphone (4)
- Airto Moreira – percussion (7)
- Uncredited – horns (1, 8), Hammond organ (2), strings (3), flute (4), shaker (4), choir (5)
- Onward Brass Band – horns (3)
- Allen Toussaint – horn arrangements (2)
- Quincy Jones – string arrangements (4)
- Del Newman – string arrangements (6)
- The Dixie Hummingbirds – group vocals (2, 10)
- Claude Jeter – falsetto vocals (3)
- Maggie and Terre Roche – backing vocals (7)

== Production ==
- Paul Simon – producer, arrangements
- The Muscle Shoals Rhythm Section – co-producers (1, 3, 5, 9, 10)
- Roy Halee – co-producer (2, 7), engineer (2, 7)
- Paul Samwell-Smith – co-producer (6)
- Jerry Masters – supervising engineer, engineer (1, 3, 5, 7, 9, 10)
- Phil Ramone – supervising engineer, engineer (2, 4–7, 10), co-producer (4, 7, 8, 10)
- Roger Quested – engineer (6)
- Gerald Stephenson – engineer (8)
- Richard Blakin – assistant engineer
- Milton Glaser – cover design

== Charts ==
=== Weekly charts ===
Chart (1973)	Position
Australian Kent Music Report Albums Chart	7
Canadian Albums Chart	3
Finnish Albums Chart	17
French SNEP Albums Chart	5
Japanese Oricon Albums Chart	10
Norwegian VG-lista Albums Chart	6
Spanish Albums Chart	1
Swedish Albums Chart	1
UK Albums Chart	4
United States Billboard Pop Albums	2

=== Year-end charts ===
Chart (1973)	Position
French Albums Chart	38
US Billboard Top Pop Albums	42
Chart (1974)	Position
Australian Albums Chart	77

== Certifications ==
Region	Certification	Certified units/sales
United Kingdom (BPI)	Gold	100,000^{^}
United States (RIAA)	Platinum	1,000,000^{^}
^{^} Shipments figures based on certification alone.
