= Proof (Paul Simon song) =

Single by Paul Simon

from the album The Rhythm of the Saints
- B-side: "The Coast"
- Released: February 1991
- Genre: Bikutsi
- Length: 4:39
- Label: Warner Bros.
- Songwriter(s): Paul Simon
- Producer(s): Paul Simon

Paul Simon singles chronology
"The Obvious Child" (1990)	"Proof" (1991)	"Born at the Right Time" (1991)

"Proof" is a song by the American singer-songwriter Paul Simon. It was the second single from his eighth studio album, The Rhythm of the Saints (1990), released on Warner Bros. Records. The song possesses a fast tempo and is built around a triplet feel that follows the conventions of Bikutsi music.

== Personnel ==
- Paul Simon – lead and backing vocals
- Martin Atangana – electric guitar
- George Seba – electric guitar
- Bakithi Kumalo – bass guitar
- Andre Manga – bass guitar
- Justin Tchounou – synthesizer
- Jimmy McDonald – accordion
- Steve Gadd – drums
- Mingo Araujo – bass drum, cymbal, talking drum
- Don Chacal – bongos
- Sidinho Moreira – water bowl
- Madeleine Yayodele Nelson – shekere
- Alain Hatot – saxophone
- Jacques Bolognesi – trombone
- Phillipe Slominski – trumpet
- Briz – backing vocals
- Elolongue Mbango Catherine – background vocals
- Djana'd – background vocals
- Florence Gnimagnon – background vocals
- Charlotte Mbango – backing vocals

== Music video ==
The music video features Simon along with Chevy Chase and Steve Martin on a parade float during the annual Christmas Parade in Richmond, Virginia performing the song.

== Charts ==
Chart performance for "Proof"
Chart (1991)	Peak position
Australia (ARIA)	134
Ireland (IRMA)	23
UK Singles (OCC)	89
UK Airplay (Music Week)	34

== Notes ==
=== Sources ===
- Bennighof, James (2007). The Words and Music of Paul Simon. Greenwood Publishing Group. ISBN 978-0-275-99163-0.
- Eliot, Marc (2010). Paul Simon: A Life. John Wiley and Sons. ISBN 978-0-470-43363-8.
