= Amadou Ali =

Cameroonian politician (1943–2022)

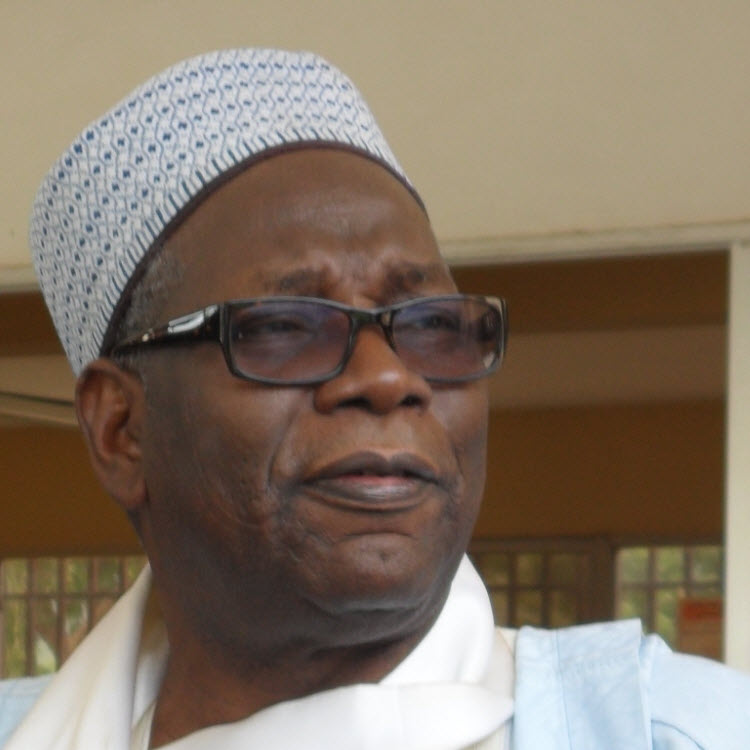
- Amadou ali, Cameroonian politician
- Born: 1943
- Died: 27 September 2022 (aged 78–79)
- Citizenship: Cameroon
- Education: National School of Magistracy and Administration (ENAM)
- Occupation: Politician
- Title: Vice Prime minister, Minister of Justice
- Political party: Cameroon People's Democratic Movement

Amadou Ali (1943 – 27 September 2022) was a Cameroonian politician, born in Kolofata.

== Biography ==
Born in 1943, AMADOU ALI, the native of Kolofata, Mayo-Sava, Far north region is a Civil Administrator and pure product of the Cameroon highspheres of administration. AMADoU ALI attended primary school in Mora. He later moved to Garoua where he completed his secondary education at Lycée de Garoua.

== Education ==
He is a graduate of the national School of Magistracy and Administration. He also studied in France at Institut International d’Administration publique de Paris-IIAP.

== Career ==
He was Minister of Justice since 2001 and a Deputy Prime Minister since 2004. He served as Deputy Prime Minister, Minister Delegate at the presidency in charge of Relations with the Parliament.

From 1974 to 1982 he served as Secretary General of the Ministry of Public Service. From 1982 to 1983, he held the position of Delegate General of Tourism. From 1983 to 1985 he was appointed Delegate General of the National Gendarmerie. He was appointed Secretary of State at the Ministry of Defence on 24 August 1985, and retained the post for 12 years. From 19 September 1996 to 7 December 1997, he held the post of Secretary General at the Presidency cumulatively with his functions as Secretary of State at the Ministry of Defence. He was later appointed Minister Delegate at the Presidency in charge of Defence, serving from 7 December 1997 to 21 April 2001. From 21 April 2001 to 8 December 2004, he held the position of Minister of Justice, with the rank of Minister of State. He was promoted to the position of Vice Prime Minister, while conserving his duties as justice minister, in December 2004. From 2011, he held the position of Deputy Prime Minister, Minister Delegate at the presidency in charge of Relations with the Parliament.

== Politics ==
Ali's home in Kolofata was attacked by members of Boko Haram, a violent Islamist group based in northern Nigeria, in late July 2014, and his wife Francoise Agnes Moukouri was abducted. However, a statement from President Paul Biya's office confirmed she was released alongside 27 others, including 10 Chinese construction workers in October 2014.

== Death ==
Amadou Ali had been ill for several years and died on 27 September 2022, aged 79 in Yaoundé. He was buried in Kolofata in the Far North Region. Before his demise, he had withdrew himself from public life . But his last appearance was on April 15 where he had traveled to D'jamena to deliver a letter from the head of state to the President of the Transitional Military council (CMT), Mahamat Idriss Déby Itno. On that day he was dressed in blue. He gave his last media address on the steps on the Chadian Presidential palace, praising the " peaceful accession' to power of the son of the late Idriss Déby Itno.
