= Germano Meneghel =

Brazilian musician and singer-songwriter

- Born: 1961
- Died: June 13, 2011 (aged 49) Salvador, Brazil
- Formerly of: Olodum

Germano Meneghel (1961 – June 13, 2011) was a Brazilian musician and singer-songwriter. Meneghel was a lead vocalist of Olodum, an internationally-known cultural and musical group based in Salvador, Brazil.

Meneghel was responsible for writing some of Olodum's most well known songs, including "Avisa Lá" and "Alegria Geral".

Meneghel suffered from health problems, including hypertension and had complained of chest pains shortly before his death in 2011. Meneghel died at his home in the Pero Vaz neighborhood of Salvador, Brazil, on June 13, 2011, at the age of 49.
