= Cristina Braga =

Brazilian harpist

Cristina Braga is a Brazilian harpist. Working with various styles of both classical and popular music, she has released fourteen recorded works, two of them also released in the United States, one released in Japan, and one in Korea. She also performs regularly as soloist with many Symphony Orchestras, has won several prizes and is currently principal harpist at the Theatro Municipal do Rio de Janeiro Symphony Orchestra, as well as teacher at the School of Music at the Federal University of Rio de Janeiro.

From 1990 until 1993 she was a member of the Board of Directors of the World Harp Congress, and made several tours of Europe along with concerts in Israel and USA. She studied with Acácia Brazil at the Universidade Federal do Rio de Janeiro, where she graduated with a Gold Medal Award. She also studied with Susann McDonald at Indiana University Bloomington.

In 2002 she was re-elected as director of the WHC-Geneva, organizing a workshop on Brazilian rhythms on the harp and performing in a show at the prestigious Victoria Hall. She also performed in Zurich and Montreux. She was the first harpist from Latin America to teach and perform at the Munique Music School, and at the Mozarteum in Salzburg, invited by Professor Helga Storck.

In Brazil, she was the first harpist to record a Samba CD in which the harp is responsible for the whole harmonic base. She also played with the rock band Titãs, in their successful unplugged live album.

Since 2003 she has been the organizer of the "Festival Vale do Café", a festival of music, history and nature, in the mountains of the south of the state of Rio de Janeiro. In 2006 the festival included the 5th Latin-American Harp Festival, with musicians from all over Latin-America.

Cristina has also performed with many leading Brazilian singers such as Nara Leão, Angela Maria, Peri Ribeiro, Moreira da Silva, Zizi Possi and Quarteto em Cy, among others.

In 2008 she released the CD Paisagem, a collaboration with American cellist Eugene Friesen, in which she interprets many of the most important songs of all time in the Brazilian Popular Repertoire. The CD was released by Biscoito Fino in Brasil and by Musimedi in Europe.

In 2010 she released with Enja Records the CD Harpa Bossa, in many concerts in Europe. She has already performed in many of the most prestigious Jazz Houses in Germany, including the Unterfahrt in Munich, the Birdland in Neuburg, the Jazztone in Loerach, the B-flat in Berlin.
