= Vincent Nguini =

- Born: July 1952; Obala, Cameroon
- Died: December 8, 2017 (aged 65) Abadiânia, Brazil
- Genres: Jazz; blues; folk-pop; salsa; samba; bikutsi; makossa; highlife; juju; soukous; mbaqanga
- Occupation: Musician
- Instruments: Guitar

Vincent Nguini (July 1952 – December 8, 2017) was a Cameroonian musician and guitarist. Nguini was best known for his work with American singer-songwriter Paul Simon, with whom he recorded and toured for 30 years.

== Biography ==
Nguini was born in July 1952 in Obala, Cameroon. He grew up interested in music through African music as well as American rock and jazz artists. He relocated to Paris in 1978 and began working as a session musician. He became the musical director for Manu Dibango in the late 1970s and subsequently lived in Washington, D.C.

In 1987, he joined Paul Simon's band, first contributing to his 1990 album The Rhythm of the Saints. On that album, he received a co-writing credit for the song "The Coast". Throughout the next two decades, Nguini recorded with artists like Peter Gabriel and Jimmy Buffett, while releasing his own albums on his own label, Nguini Records. He continued working with Simon as well, contributing to his albums and touring with him into his final years.

== Death ==
Nguini died of liver cancer at age 65 on December 8, 2017, in Abadiânia, Brazil.
