= Félix Sabal Lecco (politician) =

Minister of Justice
- In office 1971–1972
- Preceded by: Sanda Oumarou
- Succeeded by: Simon Achidi Achu

Minister of Public Service
- In office June 1972 – 1974

Personal details
- Born: 1918
- Died: 23 October 2010 (aged 91) Yaoundé
- Citizenship: Cameroun
- Profession: Teacher

Félix Sabal Lecco (1918 – 23 October 2010) was a teacher, politician and diplomat representing Cameroon. His son, also called Félix Sabal Lecco, is a well-known drummer. Two other sons, Armand and Roger both became bass players.

== Early years ==
Sabal Lecco was born in 1918 in Lena, in the Eastern Region of Cameroun. He attended primary school in Bertoua and Doumé, then went to the Yaoundé School of Administration, where he earned a diploma. From 1938 to 1957 he worked in the Education Service as a teacher and chief of examinations.

== Political career ==
Entering the government, Sabal Lecco was appointed deputy prefect and then prefect in Lom-et-Djerem at Batouri. Later he was prefect of Moungo. Between September 1965 and September 1969 Sabal Lecco was both Federal Inspector of Administration (e.g. Governor) for the Littoral Region and Prefect for the Wouri Division. He then briefly held the position of Secretary of State for Rural Development in the East Cameroun government.

Sabal Lecco was appointed Federal Minister of Justice from 1971 to 1972. He was Minister of Public Service from 1972 to 1974, when he was appointed chairman of the Economic and Social Council. In these positions, he was associated with the repressive government of Ahmadou Ahidjo. For many years he was secretary of the Cameroon National Union (CNU), the single party in Cameroon. He held the position of political secretary of the CNU until 1984.

== Later career ==
Paul Biya succeeded Ahmadou Ahidjo as President in 1982. There was an unsuccessful military coup attempt on 6 April 1984, and Biya promised that heads would roll. On 24 May 1984, at the first meeting of the UNC central committee following the attempted putsch, Sabal Lecco and Victor Ayissi Mvodo were dismissed from the UNC's Bureau politique. In 1984 Sabal Lecco was named Ambassador to Italy. Sabal Lecco later represented Cameroon as Ambassador to France. On 21 June 1992 he was appointed the first president of the National Council of Communication by Paul Biya. Félix Sabal Lecco died at the age of 90 on 23 October 2010 in Yaoundé after a protracted illness.

== Bibliography ==
- Sabal-Lecco, Félix; de Maison, Valery (2007). Toute une vie, tant de souvenirs. Éditions CLÉ. p. 175. ISBN 978-9956090822.
