= Charlotte Mbango =

Carmeroonian Makossa singer (1960–2009)

Charlotte Mbango Samè (April 15, 1960, in Douala – June 2, 2009, in Paris) was a Cameroonian Makossa singer.

== Biography ==
Mbango was born in Douala in 1960 in a family of musicians. She was from the family of Eboa Lotin, icon of Cameroonian music. She started a career in music at the age of nine in a choir and became the lead singer at the age of thirteen. She played in several bands before leaving for Europe in 1979 to pursue studies. She later joined the group Negro spirituals of Paris. After marketing studies, Mbango joined the company of Cameroonian singer Sissi Dipoko. This was debuted to the African public by the program Afrique Étoile.

Her first album, Nostalgie, was released in 1987. The Konkai album, released in 1988, was a huge international success and enabled her to win her first Gold Record, which was presented to her by couturier Paco Rabane. Her next album, Maloko, was released in 1991, followed five years later by Malea, released in 1996. In 1998, she released Combines Religieuses, then Sans Papier, and finally My Fight, her last album, in 2002. She died in June 2009 at the age of 49 following a diagnosis of liver cancer, leaving a daughter and a granddaughter.

== Discography ==
- 1987: Nostalgia
- 1988: Konkai
- 1991: Maloko
- 1996: Malea
- 1998: Combine Religious
- 1998: Without Papers
- 2002: My Fight
- 2008: Best of Konkai Makossa

== Awards and recognition ==
- 1988: Gold record
- 2003: Gold Tamani in Bamako in 2003
