= Société Nationale des Hydrocarbures =

National oil and gas company in Cameroon

- Type: state owned
- Founded: 1980
- Headquarters: Yaoundé, Cameroon
- Revenue: 1,275,400,000 United States dollar (2022)
- Number of employees: 295
- Website: www.snh.cm

Société Nationale des Hydrocarbures (SNH) is a national oil and gas company of Cameroon. The company was established on 12 March 1980. SNH operates in partnership with international oil companies and it is responsible for selling the government's share of oil output. It holds a minor stake in projects operated by international partners.

In cooperation with GDF Suez, SNH is planning to build a liquefied natural gas plant.
