= Neguinho do Samba =

Brazilian musician

- Born: 1954 or 1955
- Died: October 31, 2009 (Age 54)
- Citizenship: Brazilian

Neguinho do Samba (1954 or 1955 – October 31, 2009), born Antonio Luis Alves de Souza, was a Brazilian percussionist and musician. Samba was the founder of Olodum, an internationally known cultural group based in Salvador, Brazil. Samba, a resident of Pelourinho, was considered to be the "father" of samba reggae in Bahia.

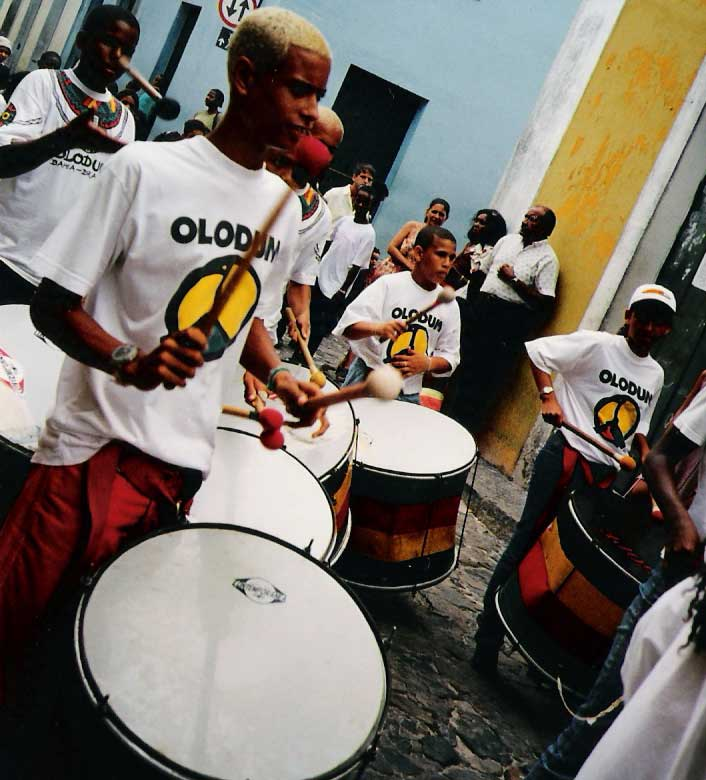
Drummers of Olodum, the group founded by Neguinho do Samba

In 1990, Samba appeared as a musician on Paul Simon's album, The Rhythm of the Saints. In 1996, Olodum appeared in the music video for Michael Jackson's single "They Don't Care About Us".

Neguinho do Samba died of heart failure on October 31, 2009, at the age of 54. Samba was buried in the Jardim da Saudade cemetery in Salvador.
