= Armand Sabal-Lecco =

- Origin: Cameroon
- Occupation: Musician
- Instrument: Bass guitar

Armand Sabal-Lecco is a Cameroonian bass guitarist, composer and multi-instrumentalist best known for playing bass guitar on Paul Simon's "The Rhythm of the Saints" tour in 1991/2. Sabal-Lecco has worked with Paul Simon, the Brecker Brothers, Herbie Hancock, Stanley Clarke, John Patitucci, Vanessa Williams and many others.

== Early years ==
Armand Sabal-Lecco was born in Cameroon. Armand Sabal-Lecco's father, Félix Sabal Lecco, was a minister in the government of Ahmadou Ahidjo, and was later appointed ambassador to Italy and France. His father played the guitar as a young man, and two of his brothers are also musicians: Félix was a drummer and Roger is a bass player. Armand began playing the guitar when he was six, then took up drumming, and eventually settled on the bass, although he is not limited to that instrument. According to Armand, his older brother Roger would often be late for rehearsals and shows, and Armand began standing in for him as bass player. He decided the bass was more convenient than drums, easier to pack up, so he had more chance of picking up girls before they left after the show. When he was fifteen, his father sent him to Paris to live with one of his sisters.

== Career ==
In Cameroon, Armand Sabal-Lecco had played funk, rock and straight-ahead jazz. It was only after moving to Europe that he started introducing African elements to his music. In the early 1980s he co-founded the Ogogoro Gang, an Afro Funk band, and began playing clubs on Europe. After a year the group was voted the number one "Jeune espoir francais". He also developed his skills as a composer during this period. Armand and his brother Félix formed the African fusion band Xamahal, performing together at the 1986 European Jazz Festival. Later he joined the Manu Dibango Band, led by Cameroonian saxophone and vibraphone player Manu Dibango. He toured with this band around the world and played on several of their albums.

In 1989 Armand Sabal-Lecco was invited to New York by Paul Simon to play bass on Simon's eighth studio album, The Rhythm of the Saints, released in 1990. His brother, Félix, plays drums on this album. This was followed by a 14-month world tour. On 15 August 1991 he performed with Paul Simon to an audience of over 750,000 people in New York's Central Park. In 1993 he was invited to Washington D.C. to play with Paul Simon at President Bill Clinton's inauguration festivities. Sabal-Lecco played on Stanley Clarke's 1993 album East River Drive, and often played with Clarke in the years that followed. He became an official member of the Stanley Clarke band in 2002. In 2004 he played at the Bahamas Jazz Festival as a member of this band.

A sample of other artists with whom he has played includes Vanessa Williams, Maxi Priest, the Brecker Brothers, Herbie Hancock, Manu Dibango, Ladysmith Black Mambazo, Jonathan Butler, Sting and Ray Charles. He is also known for composing, singing, arranging and producing. He composed two songs and co-authored the cover song for John Patitucci's 1993 Another World, later nominated for a Grammy Award. As a composer he has written for Carole King, Jeff Beck, Robin Thicke, Stewart Copeland, John Patitucci and Don Grusin. His album Positive Army, which also features his brother Felix, was due to be released in June 2012. He plays a range of instruments on this album.

== Discography ==
Albums on which Armand Sabal-Lecco has performed include:

Date	Album	Format	Main artists
1990	The Rhythm of the Saints	CD	Paul Simon
1991	Paul Simon's Concert in the Park	CD	Paul Simon
1992	Return of the Brecker Brothers	CD	Brecker Brothers
1993	East River Drive	CD	Stanley Clarke
1993	Another World	CD	John Patitucci
1993	Native Land	CD	Don Grusin
1994	Mistura Fina	CD	John Patitucci
1994	Kindred Way	2 CD	Jon Strider
1994	Banana Fish	CD	Don Grusin
1994	Classical Soul	CD	Marc Antoine
1994	Out of the Loop	CD	Brecker Brothers
1994	Wakafrika	CD	Manu Dibango
1996	Freedom	CD	Michael English
1998	C'est La Vie	CD	Henri Dikongué
1998	How to Write Love Songs	CD	Mass Mental
1999	Flamenco A Go-Go	CD	Steve Stevens
1999	I Wanna Be Santa Claus	CD	Ringo Starr
1999	Jordan Knight	CD	Jordan Knight
1999	Priceless Jazz	CD	Brecker Brothers
1999	Slowing Down the World	CD	Chris Botti
2001	Love Makes the World	CD	Carole King
2001	Blue Planet	CD	Robin DiMaggio
2001	MTV Unplugged	CD	Alejandro Sanz
2002	Maia Sharp	CD	Maia Sharp
2002	The Paul Simon Anthology	2 CD	Paul Simon
2003	Very Best of Marc Antoine	CD	Marc Antoine
2003	1, 2, to the Bass	CD	Stanley Clarke
2004	The Futurist	CD	Robert Downey Jr.
2006	Kinesthetics	CD	Scott Kinsey
2007	The Stewart Copeland Anthology	CD	Stewart Copeland
2010	The Stanley Clarke Band	CD	Stanley Clarke
2016	CIDER ~ Hard & Sweet ~	CD	Senri Kawaguchi
2018	Mankind Woman	CD, LP	Brant Bjork
2023	Police Deranged for Orchestra	CD, LP	Stewart Copeland
