= American Tune =

1973 single by Paul Simon

Single by Paul Simon

from the album There Goes Rhymin' Simon
- B-side: "One Man's Ceiling Is Another Man's Floor"
- Released: November 9, 1973
- Recorded: 1972
- Studio: Morgan Studios, London
- Genre: Soft rock; folk
- Length: 3:45
- Label: Columbia
- Songwriters: Paul Simon; Hans Leo Hassler (melody)
- Producers: Paul Simon; Paul Samwell-Smith (co-producer)

Paul Simon singles chronology
"Loves Me Like a Rock" (1973)	"American Tune" (1973)	"Take Me to the Mardi Gras" (1974)

"American Tune" is a song by the American singer-songwriter Paul Simon. It was the third single from his third studio album, There Goes Rhymin' Simon (1973), released on Columbia Records. The song, a meditation on the American experience, is based on the melody of the hymn "O Sacred Head, Now Wounded" and bears a striking resemblance to J. S. Bach’s “Erkenne mich, mein Hüter“. The song reached number 35 on the Billboard Hot 100.

== Lyrics ==
In an interview with Tom Moon in 2011, Paul Simon was asked about political references in his songs, and he said: "I don’t write overtly political songs, although 'American Tune' comes pretty close, as it was written just after Nixon was elected."

== Reception ==
Billboard described it as a "discourse on inner security while being far from home". Cash Box called it a "gorgeous, haunting, highly lyrical track" and said that the "soft vocal performance is heightened by sweet string section." Record World said that it "should touch the hearts and ears of many Americans" with a "beautiful melody wrapped around meaningful lyrics."

It is ranked number 262 on Rolling Stone's list of The 500 Greatest Songs of All Time.

Years after the song's release, the Los Angeles Times wrote "It does not ring with the loud anger that runs through our time. It is mournful, as if unspooling in the candlelight of a day’s end", and praised the song for its tender, timeless nature, noting it as a "visceral [reminder] of our history".

In June 2026, CBS News included the song in its list of the 250 essential American songs of the past 250 years.

== Music ==
The tune is based on the melody of the hymn "O Sacred Head, Now Wounded" (German: "O Haupt voll Blut und Wunden", text by Paul Gerhardt). The common name for this hymn tune is "Passion Chorale". The well-known hymn is itself a reworking of an earlier secular song, "Mein G'müt ist mir verwirret", composed by Hans Leo Hassler.

== Personnel ==
- Paul Simon – vocals, acoustic guitar
- Bob James – keyboards
- Bob Cranshaw – bass guitar
- Grady Tate – drums
- Del Newman – string arrangement

== Live performances ==
"American Tune" became a concert favorite, both for Simon and in reunion concerts with Simon's former singing partner, Art Garfunkel. The song appears on several of Simon's solo live albums and on Simon & Garfunkel's post-breakup live albums, most famously The Concert in Central Park. A live version with a string quartet appeared on Simon's 1977 album Greatest Hits, Etc. Simon performed the song live on November 18, 2008, during the airing of The Colbert Report, and on September 11, 2015, to close out the last show of the first week of The Late Show with Stephen Colbert. In his surprise appearance at the 2022 Newport Folk Festival, Simon introduced Rhiannon Giddens to sing the song, with lyrics adjusted to include the lines, "We didn't come here on the Mayflower / We came on a ship in a blood red moon". Giddens backed the song with banjo, while Simon accompanied on guitar.

== Cover versions ==
The song has been covered by many artists, notably Rhiannon Giddens, Willie Nelson, Eva Cassidy, Ann Wilson, Shawn Colvin, Allen Toussaint, Gretchen Peters, Indigo Girls, Starland Vocal Band, Dave Matthews, Trey Anastasio, John Boutté, Keane, Glen Phillips, Jerry Douglas, Kurt Elling, Curtis Stigers, Darrell Scott, Storyhill, and Stacey Kent. Mandy Patinkin covered the song in Yiddish on his 1998 album Mamaloshen.

In 2017, Elvis Costello released a non-album single version under the pseudonym "The Imposter". In 2020, Dave Matthews performed "American Tune" for Jimmy Kimmel Live! during the COVID-19 pandemic. In 2023, Rufus Wainwright performed "American Tune" on his tour with the Amsterdam Sinfonietta through the Netherlands.

Simon's own unfinished demo recording, with incomplete lyrics, was released as a bonus track on the 2004 CD reissue of There Goes Rhymin' Simon.

== Use and references in popular culture ==
The song has been featured in the television series The Wonder Years, and used as the opening and closing song to Ken Burns' documentary The Statue of Liberty. A cover version by Crooked Still was used for the closing credits of the final episode of the 2022 series The English.

Simon performed the song at the pre-inaugural concert for Jimmy Carter, held at the Kennedy Center in Washington on January 19, 1977, the evening before Carter's swearing-in as president.

In late October 2008, the progressive advocacy group Progressive Future produced a 60-second television ad featuring "American Tune" in support of Senator Barack Obama's presidential campaign. The "what's gone wrong" line underscored a photo of President George W. Bush and Obama's opponent John McCain standing close together.

== Charts ==
Chart (1973–74)	Peak position
Canada (RPM)	35
Canada Pop Music Playlist (RPM)	5
US Easy Listening (Billboard)	8
US Billboard Hot 100	35
