= Olodum =

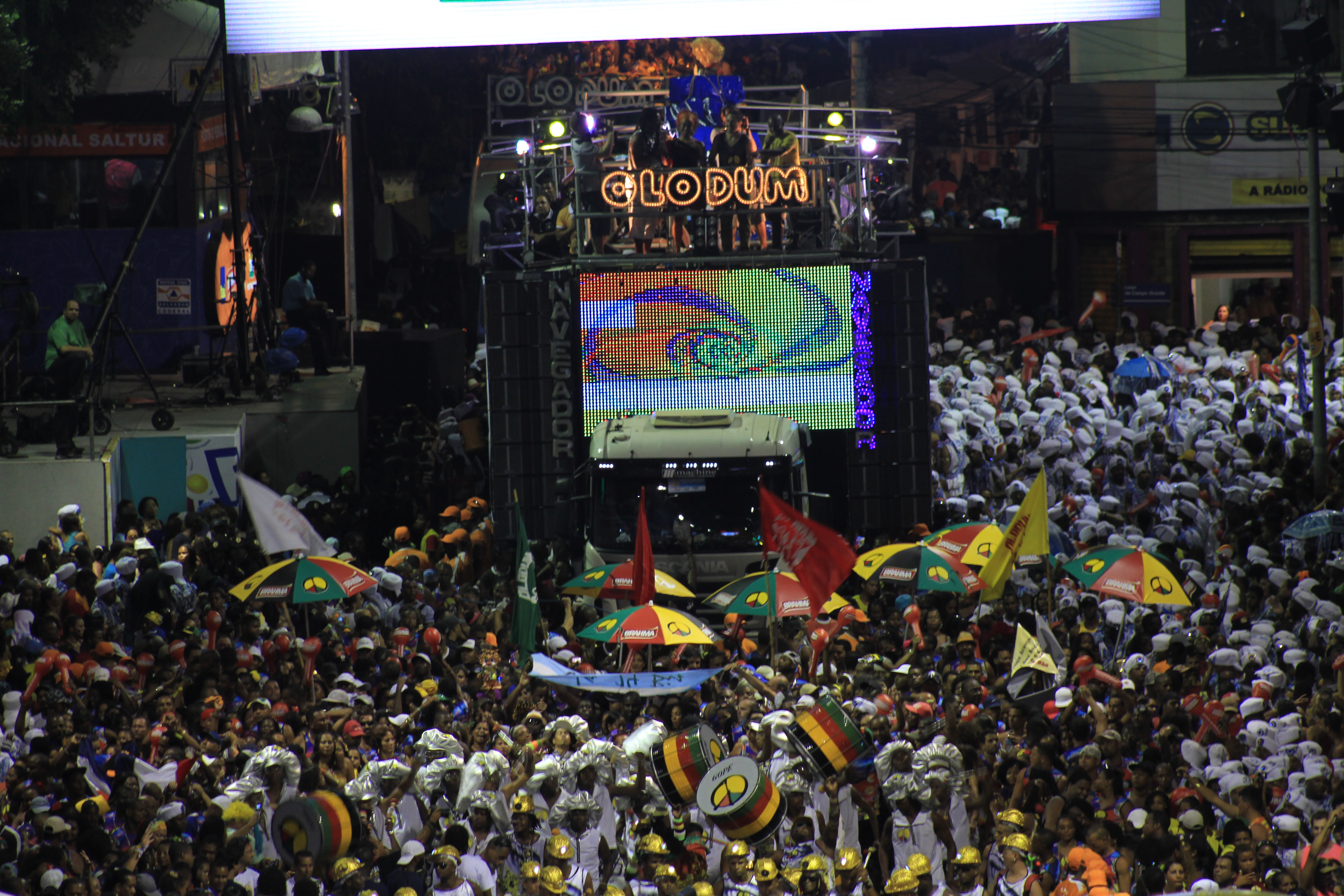
- Olodum in Circuito Dodô, Salvador, Bahia.

Background information
- Origin: Salvador, BA
- Genres: Samba reggae
- Occupation: Group or Banda.
- Years active: 1979–present

Olodum is a bloco-afro from Salvador's carnival, in Bahia, Brazil. It was founded by the percussionist Neguinho do Samba. The musical group's album Pela Vida (meaning "For Life" in Portuguese) was nominated for Best Brazilian Roots/Regional Album at the 4th Annual Latin Grammy Awards in 2003.

== Banda Olodum (Olodum's Band) ==
The name comes from the Yoruba word Olodumare. Olodum is widely credited with developing the music style known as samba reggae and for its active participation in carnaval each year. Neguinho do Samba, the lead percussionist, created a mix of the traditional Brazilian samba beat with merengue, salsa, and reggae rhythms for the Bahian Carnival of 1986; this became known as samba reggae. This "bloco afro" music is closely tied to its African roots, as seen through its percussion instruments, participatory dancing and unique rhythm. It also directly draws from many Caribbean cultures, like Cuba and Puerto Rico. Olodum gained worldwide notoriety as an African-Brazilian percussive group and performed in Europe, Japan, and almost all of South America. Olodum's performing band (or Banda) has released records in its own right and has been featured on recordings by Brazilian stars such as Simone and Daniela Mercury. In 1988, Simone recorded "Me ama mô" live, in Pelourinho, featuring Neguinho do Samba and Olodum, for Simone's album, Simone.

In 1990, Olodum performed on Paul Simon's album The Rhythm of the Saints, appearing on the song "The Obvious Child," as well as in its accompanying music video. On November 17 of that year, they performed the song with Simon on the American variety show Saturday Night Live, and subsequently appeared in Simon's Central Park concert the following year.

In 1996, the band appeared on heavy metal band Sepultura's album Roots. Later that year, they participated in the music video and music for "They Don't Care About Us" Michael Jackson's, from his ninth studio album HIStory: Past, Present and Future, Book I. The first video clip was recorded in Pelourinho and featured Jackson collaborating with the 200 members of Olodum, who played music in the video. The media interest surrounding the video exposed Olodum to 140 countries around the world, bringing them worldwide fame and increasing their credibility in Brazil. After this, Olodum recorded with famous artists from Brazil and abroad, such as Wayne Shorter, Jimmy Cliff, Herbie Hancock, Pet Shop Boys and Caetano Veloso.

In 2013, the band played live with Kimbra on Rock in Rio's sunset stage, performing a cover of "They Don't Care About Us". The following year, they participated in "We Are One (Ole Ola)," the official song of the FIFA World Cup 2014, with rapper Pitbull and singers Jennifer Lopez and Claudia Leitte. On June 12, they performed the song at the 2014 FIFA World Cup opening ceremony, along with Pitbull, Lopez and Leitte, in Arena Corinthians, São Paulo, prior to the Brazil v. Croatia match.

== Causes (Olodum School) ==
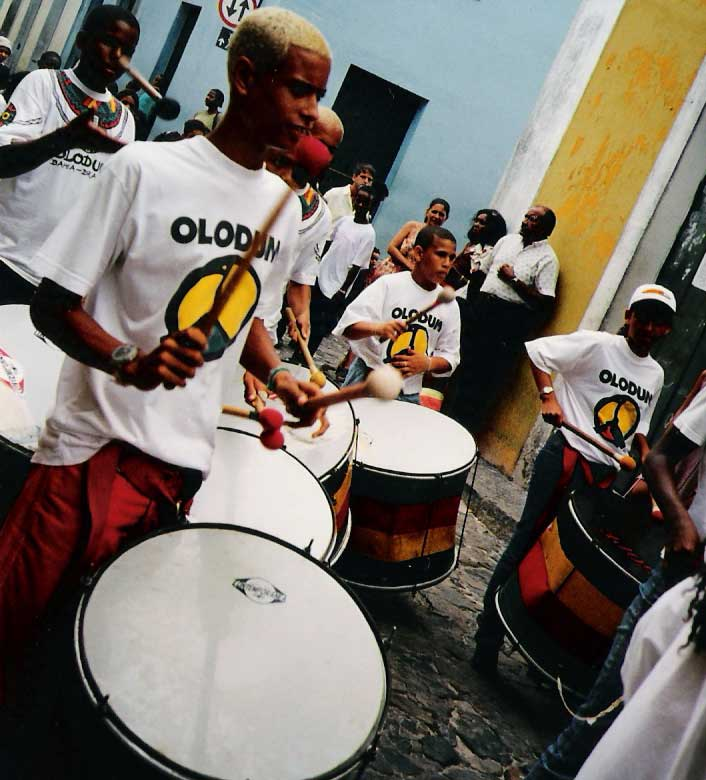
Members of Olodum performing.

Olodum develops activism to combat social discrimination, boost the self-esteem and pride of Afro-Brazilians, and defend and fight to secure civil and human rights for marginalized people in Bahia and Brazil. It developed a social project called Escola Olodum (Olodum School).

Annually, since 1980, in Salvador's Bahian Carnival, Olodum discusses topics related to the importance of African culture in the construction of society, as in the 2014 carnival theme, "Ashanti - The Golden Throne and the Queen Yaa Asantewaa." The theme song is chosen in a songwriter competition called FEMADUM (in English, Olodum's Music and Arts Festival).

== Notable deaths ==
Olodum percussionist Neguinho do Samba died of heart failure on October 31, 2009, at the age of 54. On June 13, 2011, Olodum's ex-vocalist and songwriter Germano Meneghel, author of hits like "Avisa lá," "Vem, Meu Amor," "Alegria Geral," and the posthumous "Várias Queixas," was found dead in his home at age 49; the cause of death is still unknown.

== Discography ==
=== Studio albums ===
- Egito Madagáscar (1987)
- Núbia Axum Etiópia (1989)
- Da Atlântida à Bahia (1991)
- Movimento (1993)
- Menino Dourado (1994)
- Filhos do Sol (1995)
- Roma Negra (1996)
- Liberdade (1997)
- Olodum Pela Vida (2002)

=== Live albums ===
- Live at the Montreux Jazz Festival (1995)
- 25 Anos de Samba Reggae: Ao Vivo (2005)

=== Collections ===
- 10 Anos - Do Deserto do Saara ao Nordeste Brasileiro (1989)
- Popularidade (1999)
- A Música do Olodum - 20 Anos (2000)
- Nova Série - Olodum (2008)
