= The Obvious Child =

Song by Paul Simon and Olodum

Single by Paul Simon

from the album The Rhythm of the Saints
- Released: September 1990
- Recorded: Various: 1990; The Hit Factory, New York City; Estúdio Transamérica, Rio de Janeiro; Impressao Digital Studios, Vinhedo, Brazil; Studio Guillaume Tell, Suresnes, France
- Genre: Samba-reggae; worldbeat
- Length: 4:10
- Label: Warner Bros.
- Songwriter: Paul Simon
- Producer: Paul Simon

Paul Simon singles chronology
| "Under African Skies" (1987) | "The Obvious Child" (1990) | "Proof" (1991) |

"The Obvious Child" is a song recorded by American singer-songwriter Paul Simon. It was the lead single from his eighth studio album, The Rhythm of the Saints (1990), released by Warner Bros. Records. Written by Simon, its lyrics explore mortality and aging. The song is accompanied by a performance from Brazilian drumming collective Olodum in a live recording.

The single, released in September 1990, was commercially successful, performing well on charts worldwide. In the United States, it was mainly successful on the Album Rock Tracks chart, where it peaked at number 21. Outside the US, "The Obvious Child" was a top 15 hit in the United Kingdom and the Netherlands. The song received highly positive reviews upon its release. Simon promoted the song alongside Olodum in a performance on Saturday Night Live. The song also influenced popular culture; it is the namesake of the 2014 film Obvious Child.

== Background ==
The rhythm tracks are performed by Grupo Cultural Olodum, a drumming collective ("bloco afro") directed by "Neguinho do Samba" (Alves de Souza) and also signed to Warner Bros. It, like many songs on The Rhythm of the Saints, was recorded live in the streets of Pelourinho Square of Salvador, Brazil in February 1988. Simon recalled that his encounter with Grupo Cultural Olodum was "almost accidental". He learned that the ensemble would be rehearsing within the city and traveled with some of his friends to hear them play. Upon hearing them, Simon recalled that he was "blown away by the sound" of the ensemble.

A few days after his initial encounter with Grupo Cultural Olodum, Simon brought an eight-track machine from Rio de Janeiro to the streets of Salvador to record the ensemble. He decided to record them in the streets as he felt that it would have been unfeasible to fit all ten members of Grupo Cultural Olodum in a conventional recording studio. Microphones were hung from windows or on telephone poles to capture the performances. According to Simon, "Hundreds of people gathered. It was an amazing day — an amazing recording experience." The vocal track was recorded at the Hit Factory in New York City.

== Composition ==
"The Obvious Child"
The song is based around the rhythm of drumming by Olodum, which was recorded live in the streets of Pelourinho Square of Salvador, Brazil.

The song's drum introduction is indebted to "Madagascar", a song by Olodum from their 1987 LP Egito Madagáscar. Writer Steve Sullivan writes that the figure is a "standard device" for the group, who also employ abbreviated versions of it elsewhere on the album: "Salvador Nao Inerte" and "Vinheta Cuba-Brasil". Following this, the song breaks into an instrumental fragment that, according to Stephen Holden of The New York Times, echoes the Silhouettes' 1957 doo-wop hit, "Get a Job". Holden also compared the song's conclusion to another doo-wop song, the Charts' "Desirie" (1957).

The song's lyrics thematically relate to a fear of aging and leaving behind the "boldness of youth", according to Sullivan. Holden considered it a story of an everyman pondering the uncertainty of life whilst navigating his high school yearbook. Rolling Stone's John Mcalley too found it an everyman battling the fact that his "days have become defined by their limitations and dogged ordinariness." For The Rhythm of the Saints, Simon was inspired by poet Derek Walcott, and would base first-draft lyrics on his poems. Simon attempted to match the rhythmic quality of the composition with his lyrics, whether that meant a lyric was meaningless or not. A lyric relating to "the cross is in the ballpark", for example, has no meaning; Simon said, "I found [it] to be a satisfying rhythmic phrase against the drums."

== Chart performance ==
In the United States, "The Obvious Child" reached a peak of number 92 on the Billboard Hot 100 on January 5, 1991; it spent five weeks on the chart as a whole. It performed better on the magazine's Mainstream Rock Tracks chart, where it placed at number 21 on November 10, 1990, and on the Modern Rock Tracks chart, where it reached a peak of number 24 a week earlier on November 3. It had more longevity on the former chart, where it spent ten weeks total. In Canada, the song debuted on the RPM 100 on October 20, 1990, at position 98. It peaked at number 28 during the week of December 8, 1990, and remained at that peak for two weeks.

Internationally, the single performed better. In the United Kingdom, the song premiered on the UK Singles Chart on September 30, 1990, at number 61, and rose over the following weeks to a peak of number fifteen on November 4, 1990. It charted best in the Netherlands' Nationale Top 100, where it reached a peak of number 12. On Belgium's Ultratop 50, it hit number 29. In Australasian territories, it charted right outside the top 40: in Australia, the song reached number 42, and in New Zealand, it peaked at number 46.

== Reception ==
Upon its release, "The Obvious Child" received positive reviews from music critics of the time. Stephen Holden of The New York Times was perhaps the most effusive:

The song "The Obvious Child" [...] sounds like nothing else in contemporary pop. With its juxtaposition of early rock-and-roll and South American percussion that echoes the martial drumbeats on Mr. Simon's 1975 hit, "Fifty Ways to Leave Your Lover", it telescopes pop fragments that span more than three decades and three continents into an allusive musical reverie that is beyond generic designation. Even more than on his 1986 masterpiece, the album Graceland, Mr. Simon has melded, reshaped and refined the roots music of divergent cultures into a studio art song of layered textures and wistful, mysterious poetry.

Greg Sandow of Entertainment Weekly praised the song's "confident drums that resound with special exuberant zing". The pan-European magazine Music & Media thought that the drumming on "The Obvious Child" gave the "fragile song a solid body". A reviewer for People felt that "the more exotic musical elements are subsumed by Simon's pretty pop structures [...] You never get the impression that Paul has truly gone native or even considered it. He's more like a kid camping under the stars in his own backyard." Billboard described the song as an "ingenious mixture of African tribal percussion and rockabilly melodies".

Reviews have remained very positive over time. Writer Steve Sullivan, in his book Encyclopedia of Great Popular Song Recordings, Volume 1 (2013), calls the song "an extraordinary work that surpasses any individual song Paul Simon had ever produced as a solo artist." Cameron Scheetz, in a 2014 article for The A.V. Club, examined the song; he called it "the perfect confluence of the wild, frenetic drumming and Simon's folksy melodies."

== Promotion and use in media ==
Simon performed the song, accompanied by Olodum and Neguinho do Samba, on Saturday Night Live on November 17, 1990.

The song is the namesake for the 2014 film Obvious Child; it appears in a scene in which two characters drunkenly dance together. Director Gillian Robespierre titled the film with hope that its meaning would be ambiguous.

== Formats and track listing ==
All songs written by Paul Simon, except where noted.

CD single (W9549CD)

1. "The Obvious Child" – 4:14
2. "The Rhythm of the Saints" – 4:21
3. "You Can Call Me Al" – 4:39
4. "The Boy in the Bubble" (Simon, Forere Motloheloa) – 3:58

7" single (W9549)

1. "The Obvious Child" (Single Mix) – 4:10
2. "The Rhythm of the Saints" – 4:19

12" single (W9549T)

1. "The Obvious Child" (Single Mix) – 4:10
2. "The Rhythm of the Saints" – 4:19
3. "You Can Call Me Al" – 4:40

== Charts ==
=== Weekly charts ===
| Chart (1990–91) | Peak position |
|---|---|
| Australia (ARIA) | 42 |
| Belgium (Ultratop 50 Flanders) | 29 |
| Canada (RPM) | 28 |
| Europe (Eurochart Hot 100) | 41 |
| Israel (IBA) | 9 |
| Netherlands (Dutch Top 40) | 12 |
| Netherlands (Single Top 100) | 12 |
| New Zealand (Recorded Music NZ) | 46 |
| UK Singles (Official Charts) | 15 |
| UK Airplay (Music & Media) | 3 |
| US Billboard Hot 100 | 92 |
| US Album Rock Tracks (Billboard) | 21 |
| US Modern Rock Tracks (Billboard) | 24 |

=== Year-end charts ===
| Chart (1990) | Position |
|---|---|
| Netherlands (Dutch Top 40) | 89 |
| Netherlands (Single Top 100) | 91 |

== Notes ==
=== Sources ===
- Bennighof, James (2007). The Words and Music of Paul Simon. Greenwood Publishing Group. ISBN 978-0-275-99163-0.
- Eliot, Marc (2010). Paul Simon: A Life. John Wiley and Sons. ISBN 978-0-470-43363-8.
- Kingston, Victoria (2000). Simon & Garfunkel: The Biography. Fromm International. ISBN 978-0-88064-246-0.
