= Kodachrome (song) =

1973 single by Paul Simon

Single by Paul Simon

from the album There Goes Rhymin' Simon
- B-side: "Tenderness"
- Released: May 19, 1973
- Genre: Pop
- Length: 3:32
- Label: Columbia
- Songwriter: Paul Simon
- Producers: Paul Simon; Phil Ramone

Paul Simon singles chronology
"Duncan" (1972)	"Kodachrome" (1973)	"Loves Me Like a Rock" (1973)

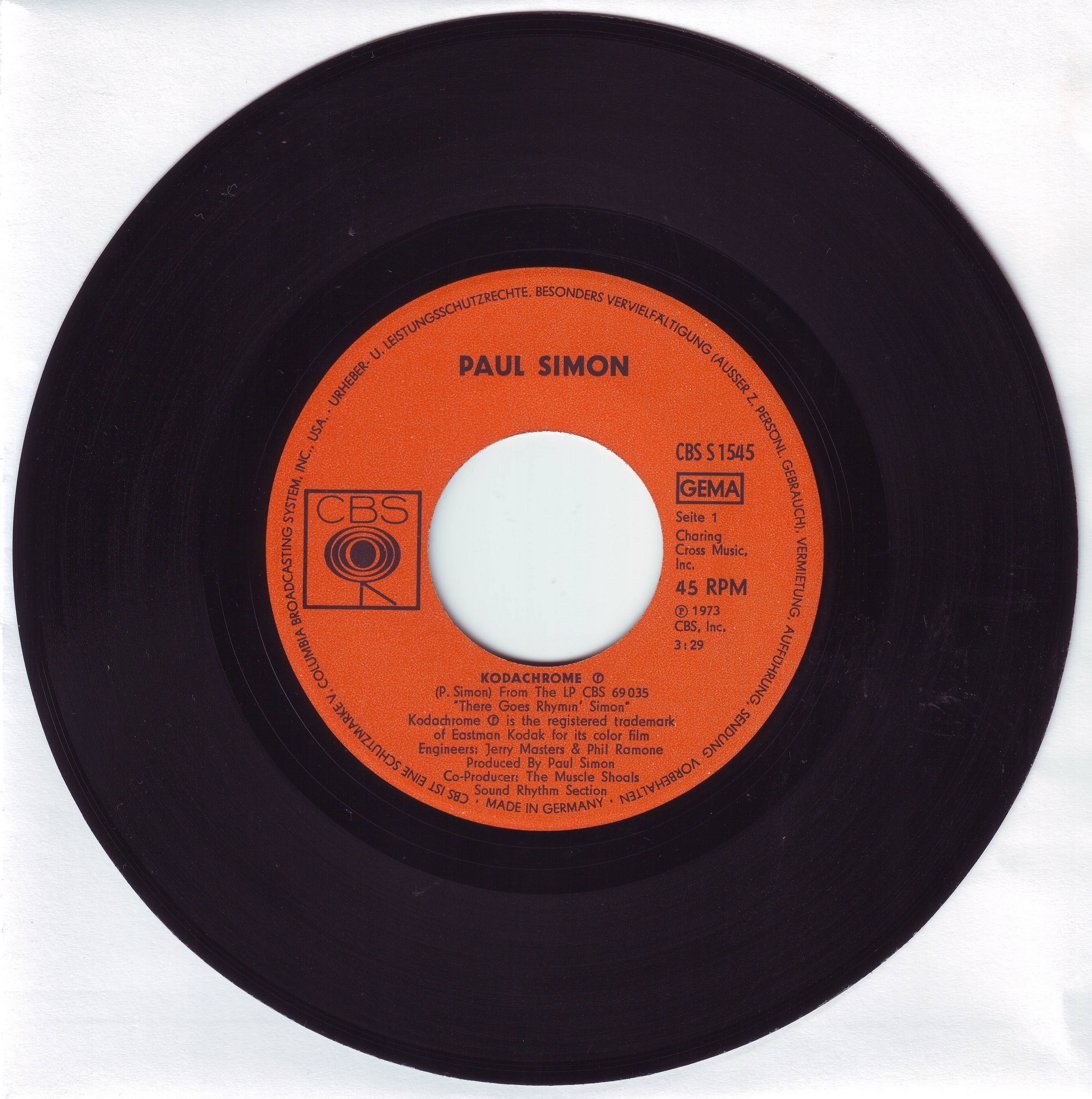
Kodachrome 45 rpm single vinyl record

"Kodachrome" is a song by the American singer-songwriter Paul Simon. It was the lead single from his third studio album, There Goes Rhymin' Simon (1973), released on Columbia Records. The song is named after Kodak's now-discontinued reversal film brand, Kodachrome.

== Description ==
After a review in Billboard's May 12 issue praising its "cheerfully antisocial lyrics", the song debuted at No. 82 in the Hot 100 on the week-ending May 19, 1973. That same week, Record World labelled the song as "another Simon masterpiece" that was "one of many potential single smashes" on his There Goes Rhymin' Simon album.

The lyrics of the song on There Goes Rhymin' Simon differed from those on The Concert in Central Park (1982) and Paul Simon's Concert in the Park, August 15, 1991 albums. The lyrics of the original album version were, "everything looks worse in black and white" but, on the live albums, Simon sang "everything looks better in black and white". Simon said, "I can't remember which way I originally wrote it – 'better' or 'worse' – but I always change it.... 'Kodachrome' was a song that was originally called 'Goin' Home.'"

Record World called it "another Simon masterpiece" and said that "perfect fare for springtime-summer radio will be hummed and whistled by millions".

== Development ==
In an interview conducted in November 2008, Simon said that what he had in mind when writing the song was to call it "Going Home". However, finding that would have been "too conventional", he came up with "Kodachrome", because of its similar sound and larger innovative potential. He also referred to its first line as the "most interesting" part of the song. That first line is: "When I think back on all the crap I learned in high school/It's a wonder I can think at all".

== Chart performance ==
Four weeks after its debut on the Hot 100, the song moved to No. 9, sandwiched ahead of "Tie a Yellow Ribbon Round the Ole Oak Tree" by Dawn featuring Tony Orlando, and behind May 19, 1973, Hot 100 top debut (No. 59) "Give Me Love (Give Me Peace on Earth)" by George Harrison.

Two weeks later, "Kodachrome" peaked at No. 2 on the Billboard Hot 100, behind "Will It Go Round in Circles" by Billy Preston. It peaked at No. 2 the Billboard adult contemporary chart as well. In the United Kingdom, the song was marketed as the B-side to "Take Me to the Mardi Gras" (CBS 1578). The song was banned by both the BBC and the Federation of Australian Radio Broadcasters, due to its trademarked title.

=== Weekly charts ===
Chart (1973)	Peak position
Australia (Go-Set)	20
Canada (RPM) Top Singles	2
Canada Adult Contemporary (RPM)	3
France (SNEP)	8
Israel (IBA)	6
Netherlands (Single Top 100)	15
New Zealand (Listener)	2
Spain (PROMUSICAE)	17
US Easy Listening (Billboard)	2
US Billboard Hot 100	2
US Cash Box Top 100	2
US Record World Top 100	1

=== Year-end charts ===
Chart (1973)	Rank
Canada RPM Top Singles	35
US Billboard Hot 100	74
US Cash Box	64

== Certifications ==
Region	Certification	Certified units/sales
New Zealand (RMNZ)	Gold	15,000^{‡}
^{‡} Sales+streaming figures based on certification alone.

== Personnel ==
The musicians on this session were the Muscle Shoals Rhythm Section.

- Paul Simon – vocals, acoustic guitar
- Pete Carr – acoustic guitar
- Jimmy Johnson – electric guitars
- David Hood – bass guitar
- Roger Hawkins – double-tracked drums
- Barry Beckett – Wurlitzer electronic piano, Hammond organ, tack piano
- Uncredited – horns

== Notes ==
=== Sources ===
- Bennighof, James (2007). The Words and Music of Paul Simon. Greenwood Publishing Group. ISBN 978-0-275-99163-0.
- Eliot, Marc (2010). Paul Simon: A Life. John Wiley and Sons. ISBN 978-0-470-43363-8.
