= The Rhythm of the Saints =

Studio album by Paul Simon
- Released: October 16, 1990
- Recorded: December 1989 – June 1990
- Genres: Pop; rock; worldbeat
- Length: 44:49
- Label: Warner Bros.
- Producer: Paul Simon

Paul Simon chronology
Negotiations and Love Songs (1988)	The Rhythm of the Saints (1990)	Paul Simon's Concert in the Park (1991)

Singles from The Rhythm of the Saints
- 1. "The Obvious Child" Released: September 1990; 2. "Proof" Released: February 1991; 3. "Born at the Right Time" Released: 1991

The Rhythm of the Saints is the eighth solo studio album by American singer-songwriter Paul Simon, released on October 16, 1990, by Warner Bros. In much the same way that Simon's previous album, Graceland, released in 1986, drew upon South African music, this album was inspired by Brazilian musical traditions. Like its predecessor, the album was commercially successful and received mostly favorable reviews from critics.

In 1992, The Rhythm of the Saints earned two nominations for the 34th Grammy Awards – Album of the Year and Producer of the Year.

== Background ==
Simon had traveled to Brazil on five different occasions between 1988 and 1989, taking particular interest in the sounds coming from various street musicians that he encountered. He was encouraged to visit Brazil after Eddie Palmieri told him that "the journey of the drum goes with the slave trade, from West Africa to Brazil, then up the Caribbean." During his time in the city of Salvador, Bahia, he encountered the music ensemble Grupo Cultural Olodum after hearing that they were rehearsing there. Simon was impressed with their playing and recorded the ensemble two days later for "The Obvious Child", which became the opening track to Rhythm of the Saints.

On Rhythm of the Saints, Simon decided to build many of the tracks around polyrhythmic percussion patterns. He said that the rhythms influenced some of the melodies and lyrics that later accompanied the compositions. Simon constructed chord changes around these rhythms and described the chord progressions on Rhythm of the Saints as "more adventurous" than the work on his previous album, Graceland.

Simon began to promote Rhythm of the Saints in August 1990 by inviting members of the press to the recording studio, where he sang material from his forthcoming album over the existing instrumentation, which had yet to be finalized at this stage. The album release date was originally set for September 1990, although Simon pushed the release date back over his belief that the mixes and track sequencing were not satisfactory, having made the decision less than three days before the album was planned for distribution to retail stores. Simon also used this time to redo some of the vocals; he told Billboard that "if you gave me the record for another week, I could take it up a pretty good notch." On November 15, Simon announced on the Saturday Night Live sound stage that he would be embarking on his Born At The Right Time world tour with a 17-piece touring band beginning on January 4, 1991, in Tacoma, Washington.

== Reception ==
Professional ratings
Review scores
Source	Rating
AllMusic	4/5 stars
Blender	4/5 stars
Chicago Sun-Times	4/4 stars
Chicago Tribune	4/4 stars
Entertainment Weekly	A+
The Guardian	2/5 stars
Los Angeles Times	4/5 stars
NME	6/10
Q	4/5 stars
Rolling Stone	4/5 stars

The Rhythm of the Saints peaked at No. 4 on the US album chart, while Graceland had peaked at No. 3, ranking them both among Simon's most commercially successful albums. The album was also successful across the Atlantic, reaching No. 1 on the UK album chart. However, with the exception of "The Obvious Child", none of its three singles—including "Proof" and "Born at the Right Time"—charted or received substantial radio play in the US. "The Obvious Child" also failed to reach the US top 40 of the Billboard Hot 100, where it peaked at No. 92, although it reached No. 15 in the UK and remained on the singles charts for ten weeks. "Proof" was a minor hit in the UK and Ireland where it reached no. 89 and 23, respectively. Within one month of its release, Rhythm of the Saints had sold over 1.3 million copies.

Certain radio stations declined to give the album substantial airplay, with a DJ from KLOS commenting that "we played it once, but we abandoned it when we got to that drum thing". Casey Keating from KPLZ-FM opted not to play the album, expressing their belief that strong album sales and concert attendance did not guarantee airplay on the radio. On the difficulties of achieving airplay with Rhythm of the Saints, Simon recounted the reasons he heard from radio programmers on their reluctance to play the album. "They say, more apologetically now – we can't program it. They say it's 'too exotic' for AOR, it's 'too hard' for AC, it 'doesn't sound like the format' of CHR." He also reckoned that he heard Simon & Garfunkel music on the radio more consistently than his material from Rhythm of the Saints.

In their review of Rhythm of the Saints, Music & Media wrote that the album "continues [Simon's] expedition into the headlands of world music" and that the album is "spiced up with Brazilian style elements".

== Central Park concert ==
Alongside various musicians, Simon performed live versions of many of the songs from the album at a free concert in Central Park, New York City on August 15, 1991, in front of an audience of around 500,000 people. The performance was recorded and later released as the album Paul Simon's Concert in the Park.

== Track listing ==
All tracks composed by Paul Simon, except "The Coast" (music by Simon and Vincent Nguini) and "Spirit Voices" (Portuguese lyrics by Milton Nascimento).

No.	Title	Length
1.	"The Obvious Child"	4:10
2.	"Can't Run But"	3:36
3.	"The Coast"	5:04
4.	"Proof"	4:39
5.	"Further to Fly"	5:36
6.	"She Moves On"	5:03
7.	"Born at the Right Time"	3:48
8.	"The Cool, Cool River"	4:33
9.	"Spirit Voices"	3:56
10.	"The Rhythm of the Saints"	4:12
Total length:		44:37

Bonus tracks (2004 reissue)

No.	Title	Length
1.	"Born at the Right Time (acoustic demo)"	3:50
2.	"Thelma (outtake)"	4:14
3.	"The Coast (work-in-progress version)"	5:13
4.	"Spirit Voices (work-in-progress version)"	3:49
Total length:		17:06 61:43

Notes:

- "Thelma" previously appeared on Paul Simon 1964/1993.
- According to Robert J. Reina of Stereophile magazine, Simon's original track sequence was changed when "the boys in Warners' front office insisted the album's lead single, 'The Obvious Child' be given pride of place." To hear Simon's preferred track order, the current release would have to be re-sequenced as 3-6-4-7-8-1-2-9-5-10. At least two sleeves reflecting this track listing are known to exist.

== Personnel ==
- Paul Simon – vocals, guitars (1, 3, 7, 8, 9), horn arrangements (3, 5, 6, 8), guitar arrangements (1, 5–8), backing vocals (4)

with

Keyboards

- Greg Phillinganes – synthesizers (3, 4, 5, 8)
- Justin Tchounou – synthesizers (4)
- Jimmy McDonald – accordion (4)
- C. J. Chenier – accordion (7)
- João Severo Da Silva – accordion (10)

Guitars and bass

- J. J. Cale – guitars (2, 7)
- Vincent Nguini – guitars (3, 5–10, 12), guitar arrangements (3, 5, 6, 8, 9), horn arrangements (4), bass (5, 8), claves (9)
- Martin Atangana and Georges Seba – electric guitar and guitar arrangements (4)
- Rigo Star – guitars (5) [Liner notes erroneously credit him as "Ringo Star"]
- Raphael Rabello – classical guitar (5)
- Ray Phiri – guitars and guitar arrangements (6)
- Adrian Belew – guitar synthesizer (9), guitars (12)
- Kofi Electrik – guitars and guitar arrangements (10)
- Tommy Bilson-Ogoe – guitars (10)
- Armando Macedo – baiana (10)
- Jerry Douglas – dobro (12)
- Bakithi Kumalo – bass (3, 4, 7, 9)
- André Manga – bass (4)
- Armand Sabal-Lecco – bass (6, 7, 9, 10, 12)

Drums and percussion

- Grupo Cultural Olodum – drums (1)
- Steve Gadd – drums (2, 4, 12)
- Felix Sabal-Lecco – drums (7)
- Naná Vasconcelos – percussion (2, 10, 12), gourd (3, 5, 8, 9), voice (3), berimbau (8), congas and triangle (9)
- Mingo Araujo – castanets (2), talking drum (2, 4), triangle (2, 8), shaker and African bells (3), bass drum (4, 9), cymbals (4), percussion (5), congas (6, 7, 8, 12), agogo bells (7), surdo (12)
- Uakti – percussion (2, 10), percussion effects (8)
  - Marco Antōnio Guimarães – basic track arrangements (2)
- Paulo Sérgio Santos and Mazzola – chicote (2)
- Remi Kabaka – talking drum (2)
- Dom Chacal – bongos (4, 6, 12), congas (5, 7), batá drum (5, 12), gourd (9)
- Madeleine Yayodele Nelson – shekere (4, 7)
- Sidinho Moreira – water bowl (4), congas (5, 6, 7, 9), bongos (5), bass drum and bottles (7), tambourine (9), surdo (12)
- Wilson das Neves – percussion (5), cowbell (6)
- Beloba, Wilson Canegal, Jorginho do Pandeiro, Marçalzinho and Roberto "Luna" Bastros Pinheiro – additional percussion effects (5)
- Pedro Sorongo – additional percussion effects (5), scraper (6)
- Antenor "Gordinho" Marques Filho – surdo (6)
- Isaac Okyerema Asante – cajón (8)
- Anthony Carrillo – bongos (9)
- Giovanni Hidalgo and Francisco Aguabella – congas (9)

Reed and brass instruments

- Kim Wilson – harmonica (1)
- Michael Brecker – Akai EWI controller (1, 3, 5, 8, 12), saxophone (6)
- Charles Doherty – alto saxophone (3, 8), tenor saxophone (8)
- Jude Bethel – tenor saxophone (3)
- Errol Ince and Clyde Mitchell – trumpet (3, 8)
- Clifton Anderson – trombone (3, 8)
- Alain Hatot – saxophones (4)
- Phillipe Slominski – trumpet (4)
- Jacques Bolognesi – trombone (4)
- Randy Brecker – trumpet (5), piccolo trumpet (6)
- Dave Bargeron – euphonium (5)

Vocals

- Briz – backing vocals (1)
- Ladysmith Black Mambazo, Karen Bernod, Kia Jeffries, Myrna Lynn Gomila – backing vocals (3)
- Charlotte Mbango, Djana'd, Elolongue Mbango Catherine, Florence Gnimagnon – backing vocals (6, 7)
- Milton Nascimento – vocals (9)
- Uncredited – backing vocals (10)

== Production ==
- Paul Simon – producer
- Marco Mazzola – basic rhythm track production (2–10)
- Phil Ramone – original Olodum recording supervisor (1), Transamerica sessions supervisor (2, 3, 5, 8, 10)
- Roy Halee – engineer
- Rich Travali – assistant engineer
- Luiz "Mequinho" Felipe – assistant engineer (1)
- Vanderley Loureiro – assistant engineer (2–10)
- Geraldo Tazares – assistant engineer (2–10)
- Bruce Keen – assistant engineer (4, 7)
- Greg Calbi – mastering at Sterling Sound (New York City, New York)
- Danny Harrison – album coordinator
- Marc Silag – album coordinator
- Dolores Lusitana – associate coordinator
- Yolanda Cuomo – art direction, design
- Miguel Rio Branco – front cover photography
- Bruno Barbey – back cover photography
- Sylvia Plachy – photograph of Paul Simon

== Charts ==
=== Weekly charts ===
Weekly chart performance for The Rhythm of the Saints by Paul Simon
Chart (1990–91)	Peak position
Australian ARIA Albums Chart	3
Austrian Albums Chart	4
Belgian Albums Chart	6
Canadian Albums Chart	1
Dutch Mega Albums Chart	2
European Top 100 Albums	1
Finnish Albums Chart	7
French SNEP Albums Chart	22
German Media Control Albums Chart	11
Hungarian Albums Chart	13
Japanese Oricon Albums Chart	87
Norwegian VG-lista Albums Chart	6
New Zealand Albums Chart	6
Spanish Albums Chart	17
Swedish Albums Chart	8
Swiss Albums Chart	3
UK Albums Chart	1
US Billboard 200	4
Zimbabwean Albums Chart	5

=== Year-end charts ===
Chart (1990)	Position
Australian Albums Chart	36
Canadian Albums Chart	26
Dutch Albums Chart	29
European Albums Charts	94
UK Albums Chart	13

Chart (1991)	Position
Canadian Albums Chart	22
U.S. Billboard 200	22

== Certifications and sales ==
Region	Certification	Certified units/sales
Australia (ARIA)	Platinum	70,000^{^}
Austria (IFPI Austria)	Gold	25,000^{*}
Belgium	—	25,000
Canada (Music Canada)	2× Platinum	200,000^{^}
Germany (BVMI)	Gold	250,000^{^}
Netherlands (NVPI)	Platinum	100,000^{^}
New Zealand (RMNZ)	Platinum	15,000^{^}
South Africa (RISA)	Gold	25,000
Spain (Promusicae)	Gold	50,000^{^}
Switzerland (IFPI Switzerland)	Gold	25,000^{^}
United Kingdom (BPI)	2× Platinum	600,000^{^}
United States (RIAA)	2× Platinum	2,000,000^{^}
^{*} Sales figures based on certification alone.^{^} Shipments figures based on certification alone.
