= Loves Me Like a Rock =

- Single cover (Netherlands release)

Single by Paul Simon

from the album There Goes Rhymin' Simon
- B-side: "Learn How to Fall"
- Released: July 17, 1973
- Recorded: 1972
- Studio: Muscle Shoals (Sheffield, Alabama)
- Genre: Pop rock; gospel
- Length: 3:32
- Label: Columbia
- Songwriter: Paul Simon
- Producers: Paul Simon; Phil Ramone; The Muscle Shoals Sound Rhythm Section

Paul Simon singles chronology
"Kodachrome" (1973)	"Loves Me Like a Rock" (1973)	"American Tune" (1973)

Official audio
- "Loves Me Like a Rock" on YouTube

"Loves Me Like a Rock" is a song by the American singer-songwriter Paul Simon. It was the second single from his third studio album, There Goes Rhymin' Simon (1973), released on Columbia Records. It features background vocals from the Dixie Hummingbirds, a Southern black gospel group. Although the lyrics are not typically associated with gospel music, the Dixie Hummingbirds were eager to record the song with Simon, and they recorded their own version soon after for their 1973 album We Love You Like a Rock/Every Day and Every Hour.

The song peaked at number two on the Billboard Hot 100; it was also a top five hit in Canada. It was certified gold by the Recording Industry Association of America for sales of over one million copies.

== Lyrics and music ==
According to Billboard magazine, the lyrics of "Loves Me Like a Rock" describe "how a mother loved her son, even when he became the president" and the music has a quasi-gospel flavor. Cash Box said that the song combines "the grace of Simon with a touch of gospel".

== Chart performance ==
Paul Simon's version of "Loves Me Like a Rock" peaked at number two on the Billboard Hot 100 chart the week of October 6, 1973, kept from the summit by Cher's "Half-Breed". It remained in the Top 40 for 14 weeks and was certified a gold record. It also spent two weeks atop the Billboard easy listening chart in September 1973. It reached the Top 40 in the United Kingdom, peaking at number 39 on the UK Singles Chart. The gospel version of "Loves Me Like a Rock" by the Dixie Hummingbirds reached number 72 on the Billboard R&B chart and won the group a Grammy for Best Soul Gospel performance in 1974.

== Charts ==
=== Weekly charts ===
Chart (1973)	Peak position
Australia (Go-Set)	19
Canada (RPM) Top Singles	5
Canada Pop Music Playlist (RPM)	1
Israel (IBA)	2
Netherlands (Single Top 100)	27
UK Singles (Official Charts Company)	39
US Easy Listening (Billboard)	1
US Billboard Hot 100	2

=== Year-end charts ===
Chart (1973)	Rank
Canada 100 RPM	50
US Billboard Hot 100	27
US Cash Box Top 100	22

== Certifications ==
Region	Certification	Certified units/sales
United States (RIAA)	Gold	1,000,000^{^}
^{^} Shipments figures based on certification alone.

== Personnel ==
- Paul Simon – vocals, 6 and 12-string acoustic guitars
- David Hood – bass
- Roger Hawkins – brushed drums, tambourine
- The Dixie Hummingbirds – backing vocals

== Appearances in other media ==
Paul Simon made a promotional appearance on The Muppet Show in 1980 in support of his movie and album One-Trick Pony. The show ended with a performance of "Loves Me Like a Rock" featuring the Muppets.

The song was featured in the end credits of the 2005 film Zathura: A Space Adventure.

Christian rock band Third Day covered the song on their 2017 album Revival.

The B-side song "Learn How To Fall" was featured in the last scene of the 2003 film Something's Gotta Give.

== See also ==
- List of number-one adult contemporary singles of 1973 (U.S.)
