= The Essential Paul Simon =

Compilation album by Paul Simon
- Released: June 26, 2007
- Recorded: 1971–2006
- Genres: Rock, pop
- Length: 148:23
- Labels: Warner Bros. (original release); Legacy (re-issue)
- Producers: Paul Simon; Phil Ramone; Roy Halee

Paul Simon chronology
Surprise (2006)	The Essential Paul Simon (2007)	So Beautiful or So What (2011)

The Essential Paul Simon
- 2010 Re-issued Cover (Sony Music Australia)

The Essential Paul Simon is a compilation album of Paul Simon's songs from the years 1971–2006 and released in 2007. An edition exists with a DVD featuring performances from The Dick Cavett Show and Saturday Night Live. It was re-released in 2010 in Australia through Sony BMG a part of The Essential series.

== Reception ==
Professional ratings
Review scores
Source	Rating
AllMusic	4.5/5 stars

Stephen Thomas Erlewine from Allmusic calls the compilation "efficient, picking up after the parting of ways with Garfunkel and running straight through until 2006's Surprise." He believes "some might argue that there's too heavy of a Graceland presence here – a whopping six tracks, over half the album – but it is his biggest album and functions as a nice transition between his better-known '70s hits and the more esoteric but frequently compelling work that he's done since."

== Personnel ==
From the 2-CD Legacy 88697 78679 2 release liner notes

=== Disc 1 ===
- Ken Asher - organ (6)
- Patti Austin - vocal background (6)
- Barry Beckett - electric piano (19), keyboard (5)
- Michael Boddicker - synthesizer (18)
- Michael Brecker - saxophone (16), saxophone solo (19)
- Randy Brecker - trumpet (16)
- Hux Brown (listed as "Hucks Brown") - lead guitar (1)
- Pete Carr - electric guitar (12), guitar (5)
- Bob Cranshaw - bass (14), electric bass (9)
- Richard Davis - acoustic bass (9)
- Lou Delgado - saxophone (16)
- Gordon Edwards - bass (8,16)
- Don Elliott - vibes (9)
- Steve Gadd - drums (6,7,10,11,18), percussion (16)
- Alexander Gafa - guitar (9)
- Eric Gale - electric guitar (10)
- Russel George - bass (3)
- Peter Gordon - french horn (17)
- Winston Grennan - drums (1)
- Roger Hawkins - drums (2,5,12,19)
- Neville Hinds - organ (1)
- David Hood - bass (2,5,12,19)
- Cissy Houston - singer (1)
- Johnny Hoyt - saxophone (13)
- Los Incas - charango, flutes, percussion (4)
- Anthony Jackson - bass (7), contrabass guitar (11,17)
- Jackie Jackson - bass (1)
- Bob James - keyboards (9,13)
- Rev. Claude Jeter - falsetto voice (12)
- Alonzo Johnson - bass (13)
- Jimmy Johnson - electric guitar (5,12)
- Larry Knechtel - piano (1)
- Denzil Laing - percussion (1)
- Tony Levin - bass (6,10)
- Jess Levy - cello (17)
- Michael Mainieri - marimba (11), vibes (11,17)
- Irwin Markowitz - trumpet (16)
- Hugh McCracken - acoustic guitar (10), electric guitar (6)
- Ralph MacDonald - percussion (6-8,10)
- Sid McGinnis - electric guitar (18)
- Marcus Miller - bass (17)
- Victor Montanez - drums (15)
- Airto Moreira - percussion (3,11,17)
- Joe Osborn - bass (15)
- Dean Parks - electric guitar (17,18), hi-string guitar (11)
- Greg Phillinganes - fender rhodes (18)
- Jeff Porcaro - drums (17)
- Mark Rivera - alto sax (17)
- Sherman Robertson - guitar (13)
- Alton Rubin, Jr. - drums (13)
- Alton Rubin, Sr. (Dopsie) - accordion (13)
- David Rubin - washboard (13)
- David Sanborn - saxophone (16)
- Bobby Scott - piano (9)
- Von Eva Simms (listed as "Von Eva Sims") - singer (1)
- Paul Simon - acoustic guitar (6,11,18), background vocals (10), guitar (2-5,7,9,12,14-16), vocals (8,10,19)
- Valerie Simpson - vocal background (6)
- Phoebe Snow - vocal background (6), vocals (8)
- David Spinozza - guitar (3,9)
- Renelle Stafford - singer (1)
- Marvin Stamm - trumpet (16)
- Grady Tate - drums (8,9,14)
- Richard Tee - fender rhodes (11,17), piano (7,8,16)
- The Dixie Hummingbirds - vocal group (2)
- The Jessy Dixon Singers - background vocals (8)
- The Oak Ridge Boys - vocal group (7)
- The Onward Brass Band - horns (12)
- John Tropea - electric guitar (6)
- Deirde Tuck - singer (1)
- Wallace Wilson - rhythm guitar (1)

=== Disc 2 ===
- Demola Adepoju - pedal steel (1)
- Mingo Araújo - congas (7), go go bells (7), percussion (8)
- David W. Bageron - trombone (4)
- Cyro Baptista - percussion (8)
- Adrian Belew - guitar (5), synthesizer guitar (3,4)
- Michael Brecker - Akai Ewi synthesizer (6)
- Randy Brecker - trumpet (4)
- Bobby Bright - background vocals (12)
- Briz - background vocals (6)
- J.J. Cale - guitar (7)
- Clifford Carter - celeste (13,14), keyboard Glockenspiel (14)
- Elolongue Mbango Catherine - background vocals (7)
- Tony Cedras - keyboards (8)
- Dom Chacal - congas (7), percussion (8)
- C.J. Chenier - accordion (7)
- Kim Allan Cissel - trombone (4)
- Richard Crooks - drums (12)
- Ronald E Cuber - bass sax & baritone sax (4)
- Robin DiMaggio - drums (16,17)
- Dan Duggan - hammer dulcimer (14)
- Jay Elfenbein - vihuela (13)
- Chris Eminizer - tenor saxophone (12)
- Brian Eno - electronics (16,17)
- John Faddis - trumpet (4)
- Babacar Faye - percussion (2)
- Alex Foster - alto sax (2)
- Felicite Fouda - background vocals (7)
- Steve Gadd - drums (8,13-15,17)
- Earl Gardner - trumpet (2)
- Florence Gnimganon - background vocals (7)
- Morris Goldberg - pennywhistle solo (4)
- Gil Goldstein - keyboards (17)
- Myrna Gomila - background and duo vocals (12)
- Paul Griffin - piano (12)
- Grupo Cultural OLODUM - drums (6)
- Jamey Haddad - percussion (13,14)
- Herbie Hancock - piano (17)
- Jessy Dixon Singers - choir (17)
- Bakithi Kumalo (listed as "Bagithi Khumalo") - bass (1-5,7,13)
- Vusi Khumalo - drums (1,3)
- Abraham Laboriel - bass (14,15)
- Lady Blacksmith Mambazo - vocals (2)
- Jay Leonhart - bass (12)
- Makhaya Mahlangu - percussion (1,3)
- Ralph MacDonald - percussion (4,5)
- Charlotte Mbango - background vocals (7)
- Forere Motloheloa - accordion (3)
- Rob Mounsey - synthesizer (3,4)
- Isaac Mtshali - drums (2,4,5)
- Youssou N'Dour - percussion (2)
- Frankie Negrón (listed as "Frank Negron") - flasetto lead vocal (12)
- Madeleine Yayodele Nelson (listed as "Ya Yo de la Nelson") - chakeire (7)
- Vincent Nguini - acoustic guitar (14), acoustic rhythm guitar (15), electric guitar (13,14), guitar (7,8)
- Pino Palladino - bass (16,17)
- Chikapa "Ray" Phiri - guitar (1,2,4,5,8)
- Leonard Pickett - tenor sax (2)
- Sean Pulley - background vocals (12)
- Wallace Richardson - guitar (12)
- Teana Rodriguez - background and duo vocals (12)
- Linda Ronstadt - vocals (5)
- Alan Rubin - trumpet (4)
- Armand Sabal-Lecco - bass (7,8)
- Felix Sabal-Lecco - drums (7)
- Jimmy Sabater - conga (12), cowbell (12)
- John Selolwane - guitar (8)
- Sidinho - bass drum (7), bottles (7), congas (7), percussion (8)
- Adrian Simon - additional vocal (15)
- Paul Simon - acoustic guitar (3,14,15), background vocals (1-4,12), electric guitar (13-15), guitar (2,5,6-8,16,17), lead vocal (12), nylon string guitar (15), six-string electric bass (4), vocals (1,5)
- Steve Shehan - percussion (13,14)
- Lew Soloff (listed as "Lewis Michale Soloff" - trumpet (4)
- Mark Stewart - banjo (14), cello (13), electric guitar (13)
- Dionte Sutton - background vocals (12)
- Trent Sutton - background vocals (12)
- Richard Tee - keyboards (8)
- The Everly Brothers - vocals (1)
- The Waters (Julia, Maxine, Oren) - background vocals (8)
- Assane Thiam - percussion (2)
- Kim Wilson - harmonica (6)

== Track listing ==
All tracks are written by Paul Simon except as noted.

=== Disc 1 ===
1. "Mother and Child Reunion" – 3:04
2. "Loves Me Like a Rock" – 3:32
3. "Me and Julio Down by the Schoolyard" – 2:44
4. "Duncan" (Early fade-out) – 4:29
5. "Kodachrome" – 3:33
6. "50 Ways to Leave Your Lover" – 3:28
7. "Slip Slidin' Away" – 4:45
8. "Gone at Last" – 3:38
9. "Something So Right" – 4:32
10. "Late in the Evening" – 4:02
11. "Hearts and Bones" – 5:39
12. "Take Me to the Mardi Gras" – 3:26
13. "That Was Your Mother" – 2:54
14. "American Tune" – 3:45
15. "Peace Like a River" – 3:18
16. "Stranded in a Limousine" – 3:07
17. "Train in the Distance" (Edited version) – 4:22
18. "The Late Great Johnny Ace" – 4:47
19. "Still Crazy After All These Years" – 3:25

=== Disc 2 ===
1. "Graceland" – 4:46
2. "Diamonds on the Soles of Her Shoes" (Simon, Joseph Shabalala) – 5:38
3. "The Boy in the Bubble" (Simon, Forere Motloheloa) – 3:58
4. "You Can Call Me Al" – 4:36
5. "Under African Skies" – 3:35
6. "The Obvious Child" – 4:08
7. "Born at the Right Time" – 3:48
8. "The Cool, Cool River" – 4:31
9. "Spirit Voices" (Simon, Milton Nascimento) – 3:54
10. "Adios Hermanos" (Simon, Derek Walcott) – 4:43
11. "Born in Puerto Rico" (Simon, Walcott) – 4:55
12. "Quality" (Simon, Walcott) – 4:12
13. "Darling Lorraine" – 6:36
14. "Hurricane Eye" – 4:13
15. "Father and Daughter" – 4:10
16. "Outrageous" (Simon, Brian Eno) – 3:22
17. "Wartime Prayers" – 4:48

=== DVD bonus ===
Videos

1. "Me and Julio Down by the School Yard" – Directed by Gary Weis, 1988 (video includes 25 second rap intro) – 3:12
2. "You Can Call Me Al" – Directed by Gary Weis, 1986 – 4:40
3. "The Boy in the Bubble" – Directed by Jim Blashfield, 1986 – 4:03
4. "Diamonds on the Soles of Her Shoes" – Directed by Ethan Russell, 1987 – 5:50
5. "The Obvious Child" – Directed by Ruy Guerra, 1990 – 4:33
6. "Father and Daughter" (from The Wild Thornberrys Movie, 2002) – Directed by Wayne Isham, 2002 – 4:08

TV Appearances

1. "Mrs. Robinson" (Excerpt from The Dick Cavett Show, April 4, 1970) – 4:14
2. "Loves Me Like a Rock" (Excerpt from Saturday Night Live, October 18, 1975) – 3:20
3. "Sweeney Sisters" (Excerpt from Saturday Night Live, December 19, 1987) – 6:15
4. "Homeward Bound" (with George Harrison) (Excerpt from Saturday Night Live, November 20, 1976) – 3:33

== Charts ==
Chart (2007–08)	Peak position
Dutch (Album Top 100)	26
New Zealand (Recorded Music NZ)	29
US (Billboard 200)	42
United Kingdom (UK Albums Chart)	12

== Certifications ==
Region	Certification	Certified units/sales
United Kingdom (BPI)	Gold	100,000^{‡}
^{‡} Sales+streaming figures based on certification alone.

== Release history ==
Country	Date	Label	Format	Catalog
Australia	2010	Sony Music Australia, Legacy Records	CD, music download	88697 78679 2
