= List of awards and nominations received by Paul Simon =

Paul Simon awards and nominations
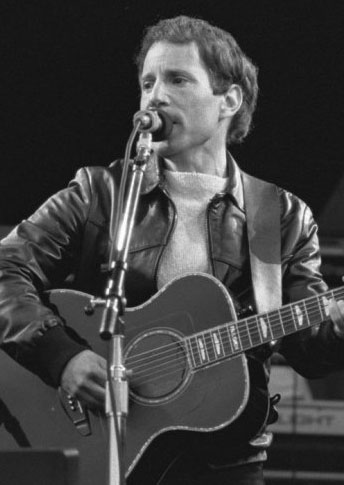
- Simon performing in 1982
Awards and nominations
Award	Wins	Nominations
Academy Awards	0	1
Emmy Awards	1	3
Golden Globes	0	1
Grammy Awards	12	28

Totals (Note: Certain award groups do not simply award one winner. They acknowledge several different recipients, have runners-up, and have third place. Since this is a specific recognition and is different from losing an award, runner-up mentions are considered wins in this award tally. For simplification and to avoid errors, each award in this list has been presumed to have had a prior nomination.)
- Wins: 18
- Nominations: 42

Paul Simon is an American musician, singer-songwriter and guitarist. He is known for his solo work and his collaborations with Art Garfunkel. He has received various accolades including twelve Grammy Awards, two Brit Awards, and a Primetime Emmy Award as well as nominations for an Academy Award and a Golden Globe Award. Over his career he has received various honors an induction into the Rock and Roll Hall of Fame, the Kennedy Center Honors in 2001 and the Library of Congress's Gershwin Prize in 2007. Two of his works, Sounds of Silence (1966) (as part of Simon & Garfunkel) and Graceland, were inducted into the National Recording Registry for their cultural significance.

For his breakout song, "Mrs. Robinson", used in the coming-of-age dramedy The Graduate (1967), he won three Grammy Awards for Record of the Year, Best Pop Performance by a Duo or Group with Vocals, and Best Soundtrack for Visual Media. For his fifth studio album, Bridge over Troubled Water (1970) he won the Grammy Award for Album of the Year. For the song, "Bridge over Troubled Water" he won four Grammy Awards (Record of the Year, Song of the Year, Best Arrangement, Instrumental and Vocals, and Best Contemporary Song). For his fourth solo album, Still Crazy After All These Years (1975) he won two Grammys (Album of the Year, and Best Male Pop Vocal Performance). For his seventh solo album, Graceland (1986) he won the Grammy Award for Album of the Year. For the song "Graceland" he won the Grammy Award for Record of the Year.

On television, he won the Outstanding Writing in a Comedy-Variety or Music Special for The Paul Simon Special (1978). For his song, "Father and Daughter" written for the animated family adventure film The Wild Thornberrys Movie (2002), he was nominated for the Academy Award for Best Original Song, the Golden Globe Award for Best Original Song, and the Critics' Choice Movie Award for Best Song.

== Major associations ==
=== Academy Awards ===
Year	Category	Nominated work	Result	Ref.
2002	Best Original Song	"Father and Daughter" (from The Wild Thornberrys Movie)	Nominated	

=== Emmy Awards ===
Year	Category	Nominated work	Result	Ref.
Primetime Emmy Awards
1976	Outstanding Writing in a Comedy-Variety or Music Special	The Paul Simon Special	Won	
Daytime Emmy Awards
1996	Outstanding Original Song	The Oprah Winfrey Show	Nominated	
New York Emmy Awards
2016	Arts: Program/Special	The Game 365	Nominated	

=== Golden Globe Awards ===
Year	Category	Nominated work	Result	Ref.
2002	Best Original Song	"Father and Daughter" (from The Wild Thornberrys Movie)	Nominated	

=== Grammy Awards ===
Year	Category	Nominated work	Result	Ref.
1969	Album of the Year	Bookends	Nominated	
1969	Record of the Year	"Mrs. Robinson"	Won	
1969	Song of the Year	"Mrs. Robinson"	Nominated	
1969	Best Pop Performance by a Duo or Group with Vocals	"Mrs. Robinson"	Won	
1969	Best Score Soundtrack for Visual Media	The Graduate	Won	
1971	Album of the Year	Bridge over Troubled Water	Won	
1971	Best Pop Performance by a Duo or Group with Vocals	Bridge over Troubled Water	Nominated	
1971	Record of the Year	"Bridge over Troubled Water"	Won	
1971	Song of the Year	"Bridge over Troubled Water"	Won	
1971	Best Arrangement, Instrumental and Vocals	"Bridge over Troubled Water"	Won	
1971	Best Contemporary Song	"Bridge over Troubled Water"	Won	
1974	Album of the Year	There Goes Rhymin' Simon	Nominated	
1974	Best Male Pop Vocal Performance	There Goes Rhymin' Simon	Nominated	
1976	Album of the Year	Still Crazy After All These Years	Won	
1976	Best Male Pop Vocal Performance	Still Crazy After All These Years	Won	
1976	Best Pop Performance by a Duo or Group with Vocals	"My Little Town"	Nominated	
1977	Record of the Year	"50 Ways to Leave Your Lover"	Nominated	
1981	Best Male Pop Vocal Performance	"Late in the Evening"	Nominated	
1981	Best Score Soundtrack for Visual Media	One-Trick Pony	Nominated	
1987	Album of the Year	Graceland	Won	
1987	Best Male Pop Vocal Performance	Graceland	Nominated	
1987	Producer of the Year, Non-Classical	Himself	Nominated	
1987	Song of the Year	"Graceland"	Nominated	
1988	Record of the Year	"Graceland"	Won	
1992	Album of the Year	The Rhythm of the Saints	Nominated	
1992	Producer of the Year, Non-Classical	Himself	Nominated	
2001	Album of the Year	You're the One	Nominated	
2024	Best Folk Album	Seven Psalms	Nominated	

== Miscellaneous awards ==
Organizations	Year	Category	Nominated work	Result	Ref.
American Music Awards	1988	Favorite Pop/Rock Male Artist	Himself	Won	
American Music Awards	1988	Favorite Pop/Rock Album	Himself	Won	
Brit Awards	1977	International Album	Bridge over Troubled Water	Won	
Brit Awards	1987	International Solo Artist	Paul Simon	Won	
Brit Awards	1991	International Male Solo Artist	Paul Simon	Nominated	
Critics' Choice Movie Awards	2002	Best Song	"Father and Daughter" (from The Wild Thornberrys Movie)	Nominated	
MTV Video Music Awards	1987	Best Male Video	Paul Simon: You Can Call Me Al	Nominated	
MTV Video Music Awards	1987	Video of the Year	Paul Simon: The Boy in the Bubble	Nominated	
MTV Video Music Awards	1987	Most Experimental Video	Paul Simon: The Boy in the Bubble	Nominated	
MTV Video Music Awards	1987	Viewer's Choice	Paul Simon: The Boy in the Bubble	Nominated	
TV Land Awards	2008	Most Memorable SNL Musical Guest	Saturday Night Live	Won	

== Honorary awards ==
Organization	Year	Honor	Result	Ref.
Rock and Roll Hall of Fame	1990	Induction as part of Simon & Garfunkel	Honored	
Rock and Roll Hall of Fame	2001	Induction as a solo performer	Honored	
MusiCares	2001	Person of the Year	Honored	
John F. Kennedy Center for the Performing Arts	2002	Kennedy Center Honors	Honored	
BMI Pop Awards	2005	BMI Pop Icon (Note: His songwriting catalog had earned 39 BMI Awards, including numerous citations for "Bridge over Troubled Water", "Mrs. Robinson", "Scarborough Fair" and "The Sound of Silence". By 2005, he had amassed nearly 75 million broadcast airplays, according to BMI surveys)	Honored	
Time Magazine	2006	"100 People Who Shaped the World"	Honored	
Library of Congress	2007	Gershwin Prize (Note: George and Ira Gershwin, this award recognized the profound and positive effect of popular music on the world's culture. Simon said, "I am grateful to be the recipient of the Gershwin Prize and doubly honored to be the first. I look forward to spending an evening in the company of artists I admire at the award ceremony in May. I can think of a few [artists] who have expressed my words and music far better than I [have]. I'm excited at the prospect of that happening again. It's a songwriter's dream come true.")	Honored	
Stig Anderson Music Award Foundation	2012	Polar Music Prize	Honored	
Rolling Stone	2011	Named him one of the 100 greatest guitarists	Honored	
Rolling Stone	2015	Simon was ranked 8th out of the 100 Greatest Songwriters	Honored	
Rolling Stone	2023	Simon was ranked the 246th greatest guitarist of all time	Honored	
