= Surprise (Paul Simon album) =

Studio album by Paul Simon
- Released: May 10, 2006
- Recorded: Summer 2002, early 2003–2004, late 2004–early 2006
- Studios: Mayfair Studios (London); Lansdowne Studios (London); Ocean Way Recording (Nashville); Capitol Studios (Hollywood); The Hit Factory (New York); Clinton Studios (New York); Sony (New York); Right Track Recording (New York)
- Genre: Soft rock
- Length: 45:16
- Label: Warner Bros.
- Producer: Paul Simon

Paul Simon chronology
You're the One (2000)	Surprise (2006)	The Essential Paul Simon (2007)

Surprise is the eleventh solo studio album by American musician Paul Simon, released on May 9, 2006. It peaked at number 14 on the Billboard 200 and was his final studio album for his long-time label Warner Bros. Records.

== History ==
After the relative success of You're the One, which was released in late 2000 finding Simon back to the Top 20 of the American charts after ten years of absence and also receiving a Grammy nomination for Album of the Year, Simon spent most of the following two years promoting the album. In 2002, he took a year off, and during 2003 and 2004 had a widely documented reunion with Art Garfunkel. This was followed by a Simon & Garfunkel Old Friends Reunion Tour from October–December 2003, as well as June and July 2004, where the duo extensively toured America and Europe and the concerts in New York in December 2003 were registered on both a live album and video that was released by the end of the year. Also in December 2004, Paul Simon's studio albums were re-released in remastered issues, as well as re-promoted.

At this point, Simon was fully involved in the writing and recording of a new studio album. He was introduced to Brian Eno, producer of Talking Heads and U2 among others.

According to Simon, one of the first songs written for the album was "Wartime Prayers", which became one of the most celebrated tracks of the album and later a concert favorite. Simon commented that, in some kind of premonition, the song was written even before the Iraq invasion in 2003. Soon after, early recording for the album began. The album was recorded in London, New York and Nashville. Simon first met with Brian Eno in London to discuss a collaboration between Eno's electronic production and Simon's classic guitar folk-rock. As Simon said, "We spent some time in his studio and decided to combine our visions. It took about two years. The actual time I spent with Brian was 20 days, split into four periods. We found we could really work intensely for five days, and after that it was a bit of a burnout."

== Inspiration ==
In personal terms, Simon was inspired by the fact of being over sixty years old – an age that he turned in 2001 and that he had humorously referred to already on his single "Old", from the You're the One album. Simon also cited being affected by the terrorist attacks of September 11, which occurred one month earlier.

In the way of the songs were written, Simon stated – "I start with the rhythm. It's drums first, then I go to key to sound to guitar to the form of the song to the beginning of the melody. As the melody begins, so do the words. That's how it's been since Graceland. I write backward." Simon was particularly grateful with the results of the songs written considering of his age.

I'm much more judgmental these days. Finishing a song is more satisfying now because I'm grateful, whereas when I was 28, I expected it. Now if I find something to say, and I say it in a way that I think is artful and true, I'm relieved I wasn't frustrated or stymied. When I was younger, I just said whatever I had to say. I ask myself now: Do I deeply believe that? Will anybody get it? Am I just talking to myself? You have to put that aside because it's not very helpful. [...] I'm trying to be as honest as I can expressing myself musically and lyrically, editing out what might be considered obscure but not trying to oversimplify or be condescending. And then I have to let go, even if I don't immediately understand the words. What I meant eventually reveals itself. You can be too familiar with the process, which I've been doing since I was 15. Sometimes, instead of manipulating the craft, you have to just be the vessel through which some sort of inspiration will flow. With this record, it took me a while to map out a path.

— Paul Simon,

Simon showed special care about the musical venture he traveled since 1986's Graceland. As he put it, "Once you go away for a bit, you wonder who people think you are. If they don't know what you're up to, they just go by your history. I'm so often described as this person that went to other cultures, which is true, but I never thought of it that way. I suspect people are thinking, 'What culture did you go to?' But this record is straight-ahead American."

The digital sounds of the 2000s also reportedly inspired Simon. "I wondered, 'Is this an appropriate context to express various thoughts, given the way people listen now and the way music is exposed to the world?' Pop music, as it's constantly evolving, is completely different from the value system and aesthetic I grew up with and contributed to." Simon stated that he wasn't demonizing technological shifts. "The Internet is opening things up", he said. "At first it caused the record business to implode, but now it's making life easier. It's broken the stranglehold that radio had. Downloading has made people more eclectic in their tastes, and I'd guess eventually that will redirect radio to loosen up, because it will have to compete. When that happens, you can say whatever you want, and there will be a place for it."

Eno was not credited as producer but as provider of "sonic landscape". Simon expressed gratitude with the album – "Working with Brian Eno opens the door to a world of sonic possibilities; plus he's just a great guy to hang with in the studio, or for that matter in life. I had a really good time."

== Singles ==
Surprise gained attention for spawning an unusual number of singles for a later Simon album, something that did not happen with either Songs From the Capeman or You're the One.

"Father and Daughter" was released in Europe on May 29, 2006, as a CD single backed with "Another Galaxy". It managed to reach number 31 in the UK, becoming Simon's only appearance as a solo artist on the British singles charts after 1990. On August 21, "That's Me" was released as the second single of the album, with the classic "You Can Call Me Al" as the B-side. It failed to appear on any national charts.

Finally, "Outrageous", one of the most promoted and particularly distinctive songs from the album, was released as the third single of Surprise on November 13. The B-side for the CD single was the American number-one hit "50 Ways to Leave Your Lover", while the B-side for the coloured vinyl 7" single was the Top 5 smash "Slip Slidin' Away". "Outrageous" was also promoted with a music video specifically made for the song. It also, however, failed to become a hit.

== Critical reception ==
Professional ratings
Aggregate scores
Source	Rating
Metacritic	78/100
Review scores
Source	Rating
AllMusic	4.5/5 stars
Entertainment Weekly	A−
The Guardian	3/5 stars
The Irish Times	4/5 stars
NME	8/10
The Observer	5/5 stars
Pitchfork	5.1/10
Q	4/5 stars
Rolling Stone	3.5/5 stars
Uncut	4/5 stars

Surprise was positively received by most critics. It gained a score of 78 out of 100 on Metacritic, based on 23 professional reviews. The Observer reviewer Neil Spencer praised both Simon's and Eno's work: "Simon offers no easy answers to the questions sprayed out in his memorable lines, alternating dreamy idylls with grumpy dissatisfaction while Eno's production ebbs and flows like a digitalised Greek chorus." He called the album "a thrilling return to form". Entertainment Weekly's Chris Willman stated that "patience is rewarded with moments of stellar songwriting", in an allusion to the high anticipation of the release of the album. Willman praised particularly Brian Eno's work: "If Surprise seduces a wider audience than the placid-sounding You're the One, thank co-producer Brian Eno, whose sonic upgrade makes his subject's musings more ear-tickling and appropriately tense. [...] Eno finds smart ways to accent Simon's worry lines." Stephen Thomas Erlewine from AllMusic was also very positive with the album, calling the album a "comeback": "Simon doesn't achieve his comeback by reconnecting with the sound and spirit of his classic work; he has achieved it by being as restless and ambitious as he was at his popular and creative peak, which makes Surprise all the more remarkable."

Both Billboard and Rolling Stone were more reserved in their praise, with Billboard stating that "Surprise falls shy of a masterpiece, but it is consistently engaging and offers some of Simon's most creative songs in two decades". Rolling Stone wrote that "despite the album's shiny surface, Simon sounds like Simon".

== Commercial performance ==
Simon promoted the album extensively, making television appearances, signing copies of the album and later launching a transatlantic tour in support of Surprise.

On May 7, he appeared on Sunday Morning where he was interviewed by Harry Smith. On May 12, three days after the release of the album, he appeared on Good Morning America. On May 13, Simon performed "How Can You Live in the Northeast?" and "Outrageous" on Saturday Night Live. Promotion in the UK was next, with Simon performing "Outrageous", "Father and Daughter" and "Graceland" on Later... with Jools Holland. That show also featured performances by David Gilmour with David Crosby and Graham Nash, Elvis Costello and Allen Toussaint, the Streets and Nação Zumbi.

The hype surrounding the release of the album was followed by a positive commercial reception. With Surprise, Paul Simon achieved his greatest week of sales during the Soundscan era, when the album debuted at number 14 on the Billboard 200 (with sales of over 61,000 copies slightly surpassing the 60,000 units sold by You're the One back in 2000). Surprise was also Simon's highest chart position in his homeland since The Rhythm of the Saints landed at number 4 in 1990. Surprise has sold 296,000 copies in the US.

In the UK, reaction was even stronger, with the album debuting at number 4, and then becoming his best chart position also since The Rhythm of the Saints was number 1 in 1990. During its second week, Surprise notably stayed at number 4, and then slipped down to number 20 during its third week, disappearing quickly from the charts.

== Track listing ==
All tracks are written by Paul Simon, except where noted.

No.	Title	Writer(s)	Length
1.	"How Can You Live in the Northeast?"		3:42
2.	"Everything About It Is a Love Song"		3:57
3.	"Outrageous"	Paul Simon, Brian Eno	3:24
4.	"Sure Don't Feel Like Love"		3:57
5.	"Wartime Prayers"		4:49
6.	"Beautiful"		3:07
7.	"I Don't Believe"		4:09
8.	"Another Galaxy"	Simon, Eno	5:22
9.	"Once Upon a Time There Was an Ocean"	Simon, Eno	3:55
10.	"That's Me"		4:43
11.	"Father and Daughter"		4:11

== Personnel ==
- Paul Simon – vocals, acoustic guitar, electric guitars
- Andy Smith – programming
- Brian Eno – electronics and sonic landscape (1–10)
- Gil Goldstein – harmonium (1, 7), keyboards (5)
- Herbie Hancock – acoustic piano (5)
- Bill Frisell – electric guitars (2)
- Vincent Nguini – rhythm guitar (11)
- Pino Palladino – bass (1, 3, 5, 6, 8, 10)
- Abraham Laboriel – bass (2, 7, 11)
- Alex Al – bass (4)
- Leo Abrahams – fretless bass (9)
- Steve Gadd – drums (1, 2, 4–11)
- Robin DiMaggio – drums (1, 3, 5, 7, 10)
- Jamey Haddad – percussion (9)
- Jessy Dixon Singers – choir (5)
- Adrian Simon – vocals (11)

== Production ==
- Paul Simon – producer
- Jeffrey Kramer and Eddie Simon – A&R
- Andy Smith – recording
- Laurence Brazil, Jim Briggs, Dan Bucchi, Daniel Gross, Scrap Marshall, Zach McNees, Claudius Mittendorfer, Derek Moffatt, Charlie Paakkari, Steve Pelluet, Mike Peters, Bryan Russell, Ryan Simms, Bryan Smith and Chris Testa – sound engineers
- Nika Aldrich, Gerard Fiocca, Troy Germano, Wade Goeke, Brent Spear and Zoe Thrall – technical support
- Tchad Blake – mixing
- Bob Ludwig – mastering at Gateway Mastering (Portland, Maine)
- Mike Burns, Chris Testa, Marlon Weyeneth and Tommy Willis – instrument technicians
- Jeffrey Kent Ayeroff – art direction
- Chip Kidd – art direction, design
- Geoff Spear – front cover photography, back cover photography, photos on pages 2 & 3
- Loreto Caceres, Mark Dennis, Erika Larsen, Laurent Millet, Jason Todd, Paul Treacy, Michael Vitti, Foster Witt and Peter Zander – photography

== The Surprise Tour ==
The Surprise Tour covered the United States, Canada and parts of Europe between June and November 2006. It consisted on 27 shows, including a performance on a sold-out Wembley Arena on November 10. Below is a typical set list from The Surprise Tour.

Main Set

1. "Gumboots"
2. "The Boy in the Bubble"
3. "Outrageous"
4. "Slip Slidin' Away"
5. "You're the One"
6. "Me and Julio Down by the Schoolyard"
7. "How Can You Live in the Northeast"
8. "Mrs. Robinson"
9. "Loves Me Like a Rock"
10. "That Was Your Mother"
11. "Duncan"
12. "Graceland"
13. "Father and Daughter"
14. "Diamonds on the Soles of Her Shoes"
15. "Still Crazy After All These Years"
16. "Cecilia"

First Encore

1. "You Can Call Me Al"
2. "The Only Living Boy in New York"
3. "The Boxer" (featuring Jerry Douglas on Dobro)

Second Encore

1. "Wartime Prayers"
2. "Bridge Over Troubled Water"

== Tour dates ==
Date	City	Country	Venue
North America and Promotional Performances
May 7, 2006	New Orleans	United States	New Orleans Fairgrounds
May 12, 2006	New York City	United States	Good Morning America
May 13, 2006	New York City	United States	Saturday Night Live
May 18, 2006	Los Angeles	United States	The Ellen DeGeneres Show (Taped earlier)
May 26, 2006	London	England	Later with Jools Holland
North America
June 28, 2006	Columbus	United States	Value City Arena
June 29, 2006	Cleveland	United States	Plain Dealer Pavilion
July 1, 2006	Milwaukee	United States	Summerfest
July 2, 2006	Toledo	United States	Toledo Zoo Amphitheater
July 4, 2006	Cooperstown	United States	Doubleday Field
July 5, 2006	Montreal	Canada	Salle Wilfrid-Pelletier
July 7, 2006	Essex Junction	United States	Champlain Valley Exposition
July 8, 2006	Manchester	United States	Verizon Wireless Arena
July 9, 2006	Uncasville	United States	Mohegan Sun Arena
July 12, 2006	Columbia	United States	Merriweather Post Pavilion
July 15, 2006	Atlantic City	United States	Borgata Events Center
July 16, 2006	Holmdel	United States	PNC Bank Arts Center
July 19, 2006	Atlanta	United States	Chastain Park Amphitheatre
July 21, 2006	Grand Prairie	United States	Verizon Theatre at Grand Prairie
July 22, 2006	The Woodlands	United States	Cynthia Woods Mitchell Pavilion
July 24, 2006	San Antonio	United States	San Antonio Municipal Auditorium
July 26, 2006	Phoenix	United States	Maricopa Events Center
July 28, 2006	Costa Mesa	United States	Orange County Fair
July 29, 2006	Paso Robles	United States	California Mid-State Fair
July 30, 2006	Lake Tahoe	United States	Lake Tahoe Outdoor Arena
North America Fall
September 2, 2006	Atlantic City	United States	Borgata Events Center
September 26, 2006	Vancouver	Canada	Orpheum Theatre
September 27, 2006	Vancouver	Canada	Orpheum Theatre
September 29, 2006	Seattle	United States	KeyArena
September 30, 2006	Portland	United States	Rose Garden
October 3, 2006	San Diego	United States	Embarcadero Marina Park South
October 4, 2006	Los Angeles	United States	Greek Theatre
October 6, 2006	Berkeley	United States	Greek Theatre
October 7, 2006	Santa Barbara	United States	Santa Barbara Bowl
October 10, 2006	Denver	United States	Magness Arena
October 12, 2006	Minneapolis	United States	Northrop Auditorium
October 16, 2006	Rosemont	United States	Rosemont Theater
October 17, 2006	Detroit	United States	Fox Theatre
October 18, 2006	Toronto	Canada	Hummingbird Centre
October 21, 2006	New York City	United States	Radio City Music Hall
October 22, 2006	Boston	United States	Agganis Arena

- Note: The September 2, 2006 show was originally scheduled for July 14 but had to be postponed due to artist's illness.
- Note: The set listed above is in the order performed at Merriweather Post Pavilion, Columbia, Maryland, July 12, 2006.

An October 2006 performance during a tour stop at the Tower Theater outside Philadelphia was recorded and aired as part of National Public Radio's Live Concert Series. The concert recording featured 24 tracks from Paul Simon's 5-decade career.

== Charts ==
Chart performance for Surprise
Chart (2006)	Position
Australian ARIA Albums Chart	73
Austrian Albums Chart	72
Belgian Albums Chart (Flanders)	37
Belgian Albums Chart (Wallonia)	78
Danish Albums Chart	12
French SNEP Albums Chart	102
German Media Control Albums Chart	37
Irish Albums Chart	8
Italian Albums Chart	21
Japanese Oricon Albums Chart	126
Netherlands Mega Albums Chart	20
Norwegian VG-lista Albums Chart	20
Scottish Albums Chart	4
Swedish Albums Chart	10
Swiss Albums Chart	55
UK Albums Chart	4
US Billboard 200	14

== Certifications ==
Region	Certification	Certified units/sales
Ireland (IRMA)	Gold	7,500^{^}
United Kingdom (BPI)	Gold	100,000^{^}
^{^} Shipments figures based on certification alone.
