= The Ultimate Collection (Paul Simon album) =

Greatest hits album by Paul Simon
- Released: April 12, 2015
- Genres: Pop, rock, folk
- Length: 67:03
- Label: Sony
- Producer: Paul Simon

Paul Simon chronology
Over The Bridge Of Time (2013)	The Ultimate Collection (2015)	Stranger to Stranger (2016)

The Ultimate Collection is a greatest hits album by American folk singer Paul Simon. The album debuted at number one the UK Albums Chart and the Scottish Albums Chart, giving Simon his first UK chart topper since 1990. It was incorrectly marketed as the first album to include a selection of Simon & Garfunkel's best-known songs as well as the biggest hits of Simon's own solo career with the first compilation to do that being 2013's Over The Bridge Of Time: A Paul Simon Retrospective (1964-2011).

== Critical reception ==
Professional ratings
Review scores
Source	Rating
AllMusic	4/5 stars

In a review for AllMusic, Timothy Monger wrote: "Though billed as a Paul Simon anthology, Sony's 19-song Ultimate Collection features nearly as much Simon & Garfunkel material as it does his solo work" and the collection displays "his range equally as a singer...and a songwriter", concluding that "while it would be nice to see some representation of Simon's excellent solo releases of the late '90s and early 21st century, it's tough to argue with the selections offered here."

== Chart performance ==
The Ultimate Collection debuted at number one on the UK Albums Chart on April 19, 2015, after selling 15,487 copies in its first week, marking Simon's sixth UK chart-topper and his first in 25 years. It also made Simon, at 73 years, six months and seven days old, the second oldest male soloist ever to have a number-one album, trailing only Bob Dylan who was two months and nine days older when his album, Shadows in the Night, topped the chart two months earlier. However, the album's sales were the lowest for a UK number-one album since Rihanna's album Talk That Talk returned to number one in August 2012 on sales of 9,578.

== Track listing ==
Standard edition
No.	Title	Writer(s)	Producer(s)	Length
1.	"You Can Call Me Al"	Paul Simon	Paul Simon	4:41
2.	"Graceland"	Paul Simon	Paul Simon	4:50
3.	"Mrs. Robinson"	Paul Simon	Paul Simon, Art Garfunkel, Roy Halee	4:00
4.	"The Boxer"	Paul Simon	Roy Halee, Paul Simon, Art Garfunkel	5:08
5.	"Diamonds on the Soles of Her Shoes"	Paul Simon, Joseph Shabalala	Paul Simon	5:50
6.	"50 Ways to Leave Your Lover"	Paul Simon	Paul Simon, Phil Ramone	3:38
7.	"Cecilia"	Paul Simon	Roy Halee, Paul Simon, Art Garfunkel	2:56
8.	"Me and Julio Down by the Schoolyard"	Paul Simon	Roy Halee, Paul Simon	2:44
9.	"The Boy in the Bubble"	Paul Simon, Forere Motloheloa	Paul Simon	4:01
10.	"The Only Living Boy in New York"	Paul Simon	Paul Simon, Art Garfunkel, Roy Halee	3:58
11.	"Mother and Child Reunion"	Paul Simon	Roy Halee, Paul Simon	3:06
12.	"Late in the Evening"	Paul Simon	Paul Simon, Phil Ramone	4:03
13.	"Father and Daughter"	Paul Simon	Paul Simon	4:12
14.	"The Obvious Child"	Paul Simon	Paul Simon	4:11
15.	"Slip Slidin' Away"	Paul Simon	Paul Simon, Phil Ramone	4:46
16.	"America"	Paul Simon	Paul Simon, Art Garfunkel, Roy Halee	3:35
17.	"The Sound of Silence"	Paul Simon	Roy Halee, Paul Simon, Art Garfunkel	3:06
18.	"Still Crazy After All These Years"	Paul Simon	Paul Simon, Phil Ramone	3:26
19.	"Bridge over Troubled Water"	Paul Simon	Roy Halee, Paul Simon, Art Garfunkel	4:52
Total length:				77:15

== Charts and certifications ==
=== Weekly charts ===
Chart (2015)	Peak position
Australian Albums (ARIA)	38
New Zealand Albums (RMNZ)	9
Scottish Albums (Official Charts)	1
UK Albums (Official Charts)	1

=== Year-end charts ===
Chart (2015)	Position
UK Albums (OCC)	27

=== Certifications ===
Region	Certification	Certified units/sales
United Kingdom (BPI)	2× Platinum	600,000^{‡}
^{‡} Sales+streaming figures based on certification alone.
