= Mr. Jambo =

Song by Kyle Gordon

from the album Kyle Gordon Is Everywhere
- Released: June 17, 2026
- Genre: Parody
- Length: 2:54
- Label: BMG
- Songwriter: Kyle Gordon: Sam Gordon
- Producer: Jamie Siegel

"Mr. Jambo" is a song by American comedy musician Kyle Gordon on his album Kyle Gordon Is Everywhere.

== Production ==
The song is about American tourist Barry Bergen visiting Africa and bothering a local he calls Mr. Jambo. (Note: Jambo is hello in Swahili.) In the introduction to the song on the album, narrator Daniel Radcliffe explains that the song was released in 1985 and won a Pulitzer Prize.

The song is a tribute and parody of Paul Simon's Graceland. Gordon was heavily influened by artists such as Johnny Clegg, Talking Heads, and Peter Gabriel, and songs like Under African Skies, The Lion Sleeps Tonight and Africa.

Gordon wrote the song in the fall of 2025. "Mr. Jambo" was recorded in South Africa and Eswatini in April, with the trip being self-financed by Gordon. The music video was recorded the same month, being influenced by Paul's music video for Diamonds on the Soles of Her Shoes and his Saturday Night Live performance with Ladysmith Black Mambazo. Gordon took Zulu lessons so he could communicate the purpose of the video with the cast.

In the music video, Mr. Jambo is played by Mandla Dlamini, who was a local friend of the music video's producer Myxo Mdluli. The choir was sung by Phindile Nqana and Phindile Mathonsi, and the cast was a local group in Eswatini.

== Personnel ==
- Kyle Gordon – vocals, lyricist, composer
- Sam Gordon – lyricist
- Jamie Siegel – producer, mixer
- Scott Hull – mastering engineer
- Zev Shearn-Nance – drums, percussion
- Matt Rubano – bass
- Jack Broza – guitar
- Jamie Lawrence – flute, keys, melodica
- Phindile Mathonsi - vocals
- Phindile Nqana - vocals

== Reception ==
American critic Jason Zinoman wrote in The New York Times that the song was "infectiously catching", and that it was the "[first] satire of American cultural tourism [..] since the The Book of Mormon mocked The Lion King".
