= Darling Lorraine =

Song by Paul Simon

from the album You're the One
- Written: Spring 1999
- Released: October 3, 2000
- Length: 6:39
- Label: Warner Bros.
- Songwriter: Simon
- Producer: Simon

"Darling Lorraine" is a song by the American musician Paul Simon, released as the second track on his tenth studio album You're the One (2000).

== Overview ==
Named after a song from the 1950s by the Knockouts, and written in the Spring of 1999, "Darling Lorraine" is a story of puppy love, marriage arguments and death and after the wife's death, the husband leaves to buy her candy for an unspecified reason. Simon had wrote the song on top of an instrumentation that was already made, as he told Robert Hilburn, "I started off with this line 'The first time I saw her, I couldn't be sure,' and I remembered a phrase in my notes 'the sin of importance,' and that seemed interesting." He called the protagonist Frank because his doorman in New York was named Frank, and also so he could make a joke about Frank being from "New York, New York", a Frank Sinatra song, which he called funny since no one says they are from "New York, New York".

== Release and reception ==
In SonicNet, Jeff Nesin called it a "long, extremely refined scenes-from-a-marriage song, has another global pastiche gurgling under a graceful melody, with a conversational, self-aware lyric layered on top ("What? You don't like the way I chew?/ Hey, let me tell you"), which metamorphoses into tragedy and tender fantasy without losing its way." Anthony DeCurtis of Rolling Stone believed that "what the singer calls love is really a desperate hedge against his inner fears" on the track, commenting that it "may well be his murderous rage." For the A.V. Club, Keith Phipps wrote that the lyrics "undermine[ ]a beautifully realized portrait of a marriage with a bit of melodrama only a few steps removed from Bobby Goldsboro's 'Honey.'" Wall of Sound critic Russell Hall likened it to bassist Sting, calling it a "jazz-tinged" track. Grunge.com writer Steven Luna thought Simon took a "more literary approach" on the song, noting that it "is a complex work that should be studied in a college course dissecting Simon's work for its artistic value. It also happens to be a heart-wrenching cinematic tune for young listeners who love depth in their music." The Toronto Star writer Vit Wagner called it the best track in a review for one of Simon's concerts, calling it an "aching ballad about a conventional marriage soured by complacency" believing that it "was stripped by Simon's insistence on underlining the narrative with demonstrative gestures and telegraphic facial expressions." It was included on the 2007 compilation The Essential Paul Simon. A rerecording appears on Simon's fourteenth studio album In the Blue Light.

== Personnel ==
According to the liner notes of You're the One:

- Paul Simon – vocals, electric guitar
- Vincent Nguini – electric guitar
- Mark Stewart – cello, electric guitar
- Bakithi Kumalo – bass
- Steve Gadd – drums
- Jamey Haddad – percussion
- Steve Shehan – percussion
- Jay Elfenbein – vihuela
- Clifford Carter – celeste
