= Over the Bridge of Time: A Paul Simon Retrospective (1964–2011) =

Over The Bridge Of Time: A Paul Simon Retrospective (1964–2011)

Greatest hits album by Paul Simon
- Released: October 15, 2013
- Genre: Folk; pop; rock; world
- Label: Legacy Recordings (a division of Sony Music)

Paul Simon chronology
So Beautiful or So What (2011)	Over The Bridge Of Time: A Paul Simon Retrospective (1964–2011) (2013)	The Ultimate Collection (2015)

Over the Bridge of Time: A Paul Simon Retrospective (1964–2011) is a compilation album of 20 chronologically sequenced songs by American folk singer Paul Simon. It is the first single CD collection to include a selection of Simon & Garfunkel's songs as well as songs from Paul Simon's solo career.

The album cover's photo is of the upper level of the Queensboro Bridge.

== Critical reception ==
Professional ratings
Review scores
Source	Rating
AllMusic	3.5/5 stars

Stephen Thomas Erlewine, writing for AllMusic, said: "Other compilations dig deeper and individual albums are necessary, but as a full-career overview, this does its job." Erlewine noted that "Mrs. Robinson", "Kodachrome", "Loves Me Like a Rock", and "The Obvious Child" are major songs that are missing but continues to write that "Over the Bridge doesn't quite feel as if anything is missing because it does paint a nice overall picture of Simon's career and does have many major songs".

== Track listing ==
1. "The Sound of Silence"
2. "America"
3. "The Boxer"
4. "Cecilia"
5. "The Only Living Boy in New York"
6. "Bridge Over Troubled Water"
7. "Me and Julio Down by the Schoolyard"
8. "Mother and Child Reunion"
9. "American Tune"
10. "50 Ways to Leave Your Lover"
11. "Still Crazy After All These Years"
12. "Slip Slidin' Away"
13. "Late in the Evening"
14. "Hearts and Bones"
15. "Diamonds on the Soles of Her Shoes"
16. "You Can Call Me Al"
17. "Spirit Voices"
18. "That's Where I Belong"
19. "Everything About It Is a Love Song"
20. "Love and Hard Times"

== Certifications ==
Certifications for Over the Bridge of Time: A Paul Simon Retrospective (1964–2011)
Region	Certification	Certified units/sales
New Zealand (RMNZ)	Gold	7,500^{‡}
^{‡} Sales+streaming figures based on certification alone.
