= Under African Skies =

Single by Paul Simon and Linda Ronstadt

from the album Graceland
- B-side: "I Know What I Know"
- Released: August 1987
- Recorded: April 1986
- Genre: Pop rock; worldbeat
- Length: 3:37
- Label: Warner Bros.
- Songwriter: Paul Simon
- Producer: Paul Simon

Paul Simon singles chronology
"Diamonds on the Soles of Her Shoes" (1987)	"Under African Skies" (1987)	"The Obvious Child" (1990)

"Under African Skies" is a song by the American singer-songwriter Paul Simon. It was the fifth and final single from his seventh studio album, Graceland (1986), released on Warner Bros. Records. The song features guest vocals from singer Linda Ronstadt.

== Background ==
"Under African Skies" originated in later recording sessions for Graceland. Simon flew over several South African musicians to New York to complete the record three months after the original sessions in Johannesburg, paying them triple union rates in order to lure them to record, as many did not know who he was. He also offered writer's royalties to those who he felt had contributed particularly to the song's compositions. These sessions also resulted in the lead single, "You Can Call Me Al".

Cash Box said that "Ronstadt provides angelic harmonies to Simon's inimitable vocal stylings."

== Personnel ==
- Paul Simon – lead vocals, guitar
- Linda Ronstadt – additional vocals
- Ray Phiri, Adrian Belew – guitar
- Bakithi Kumalo – bass
- Isaac Mtshali – drums
- Ralph MacDonald, James Guyatt – percussion
