= Ratau Mike Makhalemele =

Ratau Mike Makhalemele was a South African saxophonist, active since the 1960s. He was a member of the soul-jazz group The Drive during the 1970s. He died in 2000, aged 58.

His album Searching for the Truth received a South African Music Award (SAMA) for Best Traditional Jazz Performance in 2000.

He has worked as a session musician with a wide range of musicians, including performance on Paul Simon's 1986 album Graceland. In 1990, he released an EP of John Lennon covers called Mind Games recorded in 1986 and produced by Trevor Rabin from the bands Yes and Rabbitt.

His niece is former Miss South Africa and television personality Basetsane Makhalemele.
