= Step on the Bass Line =

Studio album by Bakithi Khumalo
- Released: 1988
- Length: 28:15
- Label: CCP
- Producer: Bakithi Khumalo, Richard Mitchell

Professional ratings
Review scores
Source	Rating
AllMusic	3/5 stars

Step on the Bass Line is an album by Bakithi Khumalo.

== Track listing ==
1. "Step on the Bass Line" – 4:26
2. "Talago" – 3:29
3. "Street Corner" – 5:02
4. "Bright Lights" – 6:04
5. "Takumba" – 4:57
6. "What's Going On" – 4:17
