= Morris Goldberg =

South African musician

Morris Goldberg is a South African saxophonist who is recognised as one of the early pioneers of Cape Jazz, along with Dollar Brand, Merton Barrow, Winston Mankunku Ngozi and Chris McGregor.

== Biography ==
Born in Cape Town, Goldberg grew up in Observatory, a suburb of Cape Town. He left South Africa in the apartheid years to study at the Manhattan School of Music, where he received both bachelor's and master's degrees. Now based in New York City, he is also a virtuoso clarinet and flute player. He has recorded a number of his own albums and is known as a member of the Harry Belafonte band and for his work with Paul Simon. He also played in the band on The Rosie O'Donnell Show.

Goldberg has toured and recorded albums with his own band, Ojoyo. He calls their sound safrojazz, presenting the music as a combination of South African and American jazz music.

== Discography ==
- Jazz in Transit (2006)
- Forward Motion (2003)
- Played on Tony Bird's Sorry Africa (1990)
- Uptownship (1989) with Hugh Masekela
- Played on Paul Simon's "You Can Call Me Al" (1986)
- Played on Dollar Brand's "Mannenberg" (1974)
