= Father and Daughter =

2002 single by Paul Simon

Single by Paul Simon

from the album The Wild Thornberrys Movie Soundtrack and Surprise
- Released: October 28, 2002
- Length: 4:12
- Label: Jive; Nick
- Songwriter: Paul Simon
- Producer: Paul Simon

Paul Simon singles chronology
| "You're the One" (2000) | "Father and Daughter" (2002) | "Father and Daughter" / "Another Galaxy" (2006) |

"Father and Daughter" is a song by American singer-songwriter Paul Simon. The song, written for the animated family film The Wild Thornberrys Movie, was released as a single in October 2002. An alternate version later appeared on Simon's 11th solo album, Surprise (2006). When re-released as a single in 2006, the song became a top-40 hit in the UK, giving Simon his most recent hit. The song is a ballad in which Simon expresses his love for his daughter, Lulu. "Father and Daughter" was nominated for an Academy Award for Best Original Song, as well as the Golden Globe Award for Best Original Song.

== Background ==
The song expresses the singer's hopes and dreams for his daughter. Simon wrote the song as an ode to his daughter, Lulu, who was seven at the time it was completed. Simon's son, Adrian, sings harmony on the song's choruses; he was 10 years old at the time of recording. He had heard his son singing along to it while driving and encouraged him to contribute to it.

The song was written for the animated family film The Wild Thornberrys Movie and released in 2002. The song also appeared on the movie soundtrack album, and a different mix of the same performance was used for Simon's 2006 release, Surprise, and the 2007 compilation, The Essential Paul Simon.

== Reception ==
The song received a favorable response from critics. Scott Mervis, writing for the Pittsburgh Post-Gazette, considered it "the best pop song he's written in years", while Claudia Puig of USA Today dubbed it "classic Simon". Heather Phares of AllMusic felt it "mellow [and] amiable".

== Music video ==
The music video for the song was directed by Wayne Isham and features Simon performing the song in a child's bedroom, intercut with clips from The Wild Thornberrys Movie, as well as live action clips of wild animals (which were used in the end credits of the film).

== Track listings ==
2002 CD single

1. "Father and Daughter" (album version) – 4:12
2. "Father and Daughter" (instrumental) – 4:12
3. "Father and Daughter" (video)

2006 CD single

1. "Father and Daughter" – 4:11
2. "Another Galaxy" – 5:22

== Personnel ==
- Paul Simon – vocals, electric guitar, nylon-string acoustic guitar, high-string acoustic guitar
- Vincent Nguini – acoustic guitar
- Steve Gadd – drums
- Abe Laboriel – bass
- Adrian Simon – vocals

== Charts ==
=== Weekly charts ===
| Chart (2002–2003) | Peak position |
|---|---|
| US Adult Alternative Airplay (Billboard) | 5 |
| US Adult Contemporary (Billboard) | 20 |

| Chart (2006) | Peak position |
|---|---|
| UK Singles (OCC) | 31 |
| UK Airplay (Music Week) | 20 |

=== Year-end charts ===
| Chart (2003) | Position |
|---|---|
| US Triple-A (Billboard) | 23 |

== Release history ==
| Region | Date | Format(s) | Label(s) | Ref. |
|---|---|---|---|---|
| United States | October 28, 2002 | Adult contemporary; hot adult contemporary; triple A radio | Jive; Nick | |
| United Kingdom | May 29, 2006 | CD | Warner Bros. | |
