= The Wild Thornberrys Movie =

2002 American animated adventure film

- Theatrical release poster
- Directed by: Jeff McGrath; Cathy Malkasian
- Written by: Kate Boutilier
- Based on: The Wild Thornberrys by Arlene Klasky; Gábor Csupó; Steve Pepoon; David Silverman; Stephen Sustarsic
- Produced by: Arlene Klasky; Gábor Csupó
- Starring: Lacey Chabert; Tom Kane; Danielle Harris; Jodi Carlisle; Tim Curry; Lynn Redgrave; Rupert Everett; Marisa Tomei; Flea
- Edited by: John Bryant
- Music by: Drew Neumann
- Production companies: Nickelodeon Movies; Klasky Csupo
- Distributed by: Paramount Pictures
- Release date: December 20, 2002
- Running time: 85 minutes
- Country: United States
- Language: English
- Budget: $25 million
- Box office: $60.7 million

The Wild Thornberrys Movie is a 2002 American animated adventure film based on the eponymous animated series created by Arlene Klasky, Gábor Csupó, Steve Pepoon, David Sliverman, and Stephen Sustarsic. Produced by Nickelodeon Movies and Klasky Csupo, it was directed by Jeff McGrath and Cathy Malkasian from a screenplay by Kate Boutilier, and features the voices of Lacey Chabert, Tom Kane, Danielle Harris, Jodi Carlisle, Tim Curry, Lynn Redgrave, Rupert Everett, Marisa Tomei, and Flea. The film follows Eliza Thornberry, as she goes on a quest to save a cheetah cub from ruthless poachers. It is the first installment in The Wild Thornberrys film series. The film's music score was written by series composer Drew Neumann.

The Wild Thornberrys Movie was released on December 20, 2002, by Paramount Pictures. It received positive reviews and grossed $61 million worldwide. The film was nominated for Best Original Song at the 75th Academy Awards for Paul Simon's "Father and Daughter". A standalone sequel and crossover with characters from Rugrats, titled Rugrats Go Wild, was released in 2003.

== Plot ==
Eliza Thornberry plays with a family of cheetahs in Kenya after being left in charge of the cubs by their mother Akela. When Eliza strays far from the cheetahs' home, one of the cheetah cubs Tally is kidnapped by poachers in a helicopter. Eliza is determined to save the cub, which prompts her strict grandmother Cordelia to bring her to a boarding school in London as punishment for sneaking out to meet some wild animals. Upon arriving, Eliza discovers that her pet chimpanzee, Darwin, stowed away in her suitcase. He attempts to blend in but gets both him and Eliza in trouble.

After having a dream in which Shaman Mnyambo tells her to save Tally, Eliza and Darwin decide to return to Kenya. While taking a train from Nairobi, they encounter an injured male rhinoceros, who was shot at the river by the same poachers who kidnapped Tally. They save the rhino with the help of veterinarians Sloan and Bree Blackburn. Meanwhile, Eliza's older sister Debbie is left alone with her constantly feral adoptive younger brother Donnie at their RV, the Comvee, while their parents, Nigel and Marianne, go to film a solar eclipse at Tembo Valley. Eliza returns to the Comvee for supplies; after a small confrontation, Debbie pursues her, Darwin, and Donnie. Cordelia and her husband, Colonel Radcliffe, meet up with Nigel and Marianne to inform them of Eliza's escape, and they also begin searching for Eliza to force her back to school.

Darwin, Eliza, and Donnie meet a gorilla who mentions seeing people setting up a fence across Tembo Valley. Then, they run into the Blackburns again. Eliza concludes that the poachers are targeting an elephant herd traveling through the valley. Later, the trio finds Tally in the Blackburns' RV, exposing their true nature as the poachers. The Blackburns capture them and reveal the fence is electrified. Meanwhile, Debbie meets a local Mbuti boy named Boko, who is sent by his village elders to assist her. The two reach the Blackburns' RV, but Sloan holds Debbie hostage after she reveals she is Eliza's sister. When Sloan threatens to kill Debbie if Eliza doesn't tell him how she found out their decision, Eliza admits it was because of her ability to talk to animals. A storm arrives and takes away Eliza's powers while the Blackburns flee.

They reach Tembo Valley in time to see the elephant herd heading for the electric fence. When Eliza becomes doubtful of herself, Debbie reminds her that she has been helping animals long before gaining her powers, restoring her confidence. The Blackburns, riding their helicopter, order their men to set off explosives, scaring the elephants and making them charge toward the fence. Eliza triggers the fence's electricity prematurely, causing the herd to stop temporarily, and then convinces the lead elephant to turn around. Infuriated by this, Sloan throws Eliza into a river. He then attempts to shoot the elephants, but they pull the Blackburns' copter out of the air by its rope ladder and destroy it, causing him and Bree to fall. They survive the fall, but are apprehended by park rangers soon after as the eclipse ends. Eliza nearly drowns until she is saved by Shaman Mnyambo, who tells her she saved the elephants using her heart instead of her powers. As a reward, he gives her back her powers.

Eliza reunites with her family, who decide to lift Eliza's punishment and not to send her back to boarding school, while Boko returns to his village, keeping Debbie's watch as a memento. The Thornberrys return to the savanna, where Eliza reunites Tally with his family. Debbie is angered when Eliza tells her that she will turn into a baboon if she reveals her secret and, in the process, frightens a group of olive baboons Nigel and Marianne are filming. One of them activates the radio, which plays music that the Thornberrys and the primates dance to.

== Voice cast ==
- Lacey Chabert as Elizabeth "Eliza" Thornberry, a 12-year-old girl who talks to animals.
- Tim Curry as:
  - Sir Nigel Thornberry, the world famous host of nature program Nigel Thornberry's Animal World and the husband of Marianne, father of Debbie, Eliza and Donnie, and son of Cordelia and Col. Radcliffe Thornberry.
  - Col. Radcliffe Thornberry, the father of Nigel Thornberry, the father-in-law of Marianne and the grandfather of Debbie, Eliza and Donnie.
- Jodi Carlisle as Marianne Thornberry, the wife of Nigel, mother of Debbie, Eliza and Donnie and the camera operator/editor of their nature show.
- Danielle Harris as Deborah "Debbie" Thornberry, Eliza's 16-year-old older sister.
- Flea as Donald Michael "Donnie" Thornberry, a feral boy who does not talk much.
- Tom Kane as Darwin Thornberry, The Thornberry's pet chimpanzee and Eliza's best friend.
- Lynn Redgrave as Cordelia Jasmin McGold Thornberry, Col. Radcliffe Thornberry's wife, Marianne's mother-in-law, Nigel's mother and Debbie, Eliza and Donnie's grandmother.
- Rupert Everett as Sloan Blackburn, a British poacher posing as a veterinarian and the main villain of the film. He and his wife Bree are willing to kill various animals.
- Marisa Tomei as Bree Blackburn, Sloan's wife and a female poacher posing as a veterinarian and the secondary villain. She is willing to kill various animals alongside her husband.
- Brock Peters as Jomo Umbelli, a safari park ranger and Nigel's best friend. This was Peters' final film before his death in 2005.
- Alfre Woodard as Akela, the female cheetah who lost her cub Tally to the Blackburns.
- Kimberly Brooks as Tally, a cheetah cub who is abducted by the Blackburns.
- Cree Summer as Phaedra, the elephant Eliza is riding at the start of the film.
- Brenda Blethyn as Mrs. Alice June Fairgood, the headmistress of Lady Beatrice's boarding school in London.
- Obba Babatundé as Boko, a Mbuti boy.
- Kevin Michael Richardson as Shaman Mnyambo, a witch doctor.
- Melissa Greenspan as Sarah Wellington, Eliza's snobby roommate.
- Alexandra Boyd as Victoria, one of Sarah's friends.
- Moira Quirk as Jane, one of Sarah's friends.
- Tara Strong, Hynden Walch, and Mae Whitman as The Schoolgirls, three British preteen schoolgirls.
- Roger L. Jackson as:
  - Reggie, a red squirrel.
  - Thunder, a Scottish-accented Clydesdale horse.
- Jeff Coopwood as Park Ranger Tim, a park ranger that the Thornberrys met.
- Billy Brown as the male black rhinoceros who was shot at the river by the Blackburns
- Keith Szarabajka as a poacher working for the Blackburns
- Earl Boen as the gorilla.

== Reception ==
=== Box office ===
The film opened in the U.S. box office on December 20, 2002, and finished at #6 for the weekend, with $6 million for 3,012 theaters, for an average of $1,997 per venue. The film ended up with a modest $40 million domestically, partly because the film released two days after The Lord of the Rings: The Two Towers. Despite this, in light of generally favorable reviews, it managed to out-gross competing animated feature Treasure Planet, which grossed about $38 million domestically.

It is one of a limited number of feature films to be released in over 3,000 theaters, and still improve on its box office performance in its second weekend, increasing 22.5% from $6 million to $7.4 million.

=== Critical response ===
Rotten Tomatoes, a review aggregator, reports that 80% of 87 critics gave the film a positive review; the average rating is 6.7/10. The site's consensus states: "The Wild Thornberrys Movie brings its beloved clan to the big screen for an animated adventure that should prove entertaining for all ages." On Metacritic the film has a weighted average score of 69 out of 100, based on 25 critics, indicating "generally favorable reviews". Audiences polled by CinemaScore gave the film an average grade of "A" on an A+ to F scale. Roger Ebert and Richard Roeper both praised the film and gave it “Two Thumbs Up” on their television show.

Kevin Thomas of the Los Angeles Times called it "a witty and delightful Christmas present for the entire family". Thomas said it "balances some honest heart-tugging with a sophisticated sense of humor", making it rare among children's films. Writing for The New York Times, Dave Kehr described it as an "extended Saturday morning cartoon" that is "bland but harmless", comparing it negatively to Disney's The Lion King. In USA Today, Claudia Puig rated it 3/4 stars and wrote, "The Wild Thornberrys will no doubt brighten the day of parents looking for family activities during the holidays." It was also reviewed by Boston.com and Film4.

=== Accolades ===
The film was nominated for an Academy Award for Best Original Song for "Father and Daughter" by Paul Simon, but lost to "Lose Yourself" by Eminem for 8 Mile.

== Home media ==
Paramount Home Entertainment released the film on VHS and DVD on April 1, 2003.

== Video game ==
A video game based on the movie was released by THQ for the Game Boy Advance and PC. The game's story mode puts players in the role of Eliza in scenarios loosely based on the events of the movie, and contains mini-games that allow the player to control other members of the Thornberrys.

== Music ==
=== Soundtrack ===
The Wild Thornberrys Movie: Music from the Motion Picture

Soundtrack album by Various Artists
- Released: November 26, 2002
- Recorded: 2002
- Genres: Hip hop, world music, teen pop, rock
- Length: 58:07
- Labels: Jive Records; Nick Records; Zomba Music
- Producer: Various Artists

Singles from The Wild Thornberrys Movie: Music from the Motion Picture
- 1. "Father and Daughter" Released: 2002; 2. "Dance with Us" Released: 2002; 3. "Happy" Released: 2002

An original soundtrack for the film was released on November 26, 2002, on compact disc and audio cassette by Zomba Music, Jive Records, and Nick Records. The executive producer was George Acogny. Paul Simon's "Father and Daughter", written for the film, was released as a single. It went on to be nominated for an Academy Award for Best Original Song and a Golden Globe Award for Best Original Song.

Professional ratings
Review scores
Source	Rating
Allmusic	4/5 stars

No.	Title	Artist(s)	Length
1.	"Father and Daughter"	Paul Simon	4:10
2.	"Iwoya"	Angélique Kidjo featuring Dave Matthews	3:47
3.	"Dance with Us"	P. Diddy and Brandy featuring Bow Wow	4:56
4.	"Animal Nation"	Peter Gabriel	7:20
5.	"Happy"	Sita	4:06
6.	"Motla Le Pula (The Rainmaker)"	Hugh Masekela	5:35
7.	"Monkey Man"	Reel Big Fish	2:36
8.	"Don't Walk Away"	Youssou N'Dour featuring Sting	4:42
9.	"Accident"	Baha Men	2:48
10.	"End of Forever"	Nick Carter	4:05
11.	"Shaking the Tree ('02 Remix)"	Peter Gabriel and Youssou N'Dour featuring Shaggy	5:08
12.	"Get Out of London"	The Pretenders	3:11
13.	"Africa (Ila Ra Waisco)"	Las Hijas del Sol	3:56
14.	"Awa Awa"	Wes	4:27
Total length:			58:07

=== Score ===
The Wild Thornberrys Movie: Original Motion Picture Score

Soundtrack album by Drew Neumann
- Released: April 8, 2003
- Recorded: 2002
- Genre: Soundtrack
- Label: Silverline Records/Nick Records

The score was released by Silverline Records on April 8, 2003, and includes the theme song "Bridge to the Stars", which was composed by Randy Kerber (who composed the additional music for the score) and J. Peter Robinson, with lyrics by Maribeth Derry and performed by Tracey Amos and Lisa McClowry. The album is currently out of print.

== Crossover sequel ==
A crossover sequel featuring characters from Rugrats (another series from Klasky Csupo), titled Rugrats Go Wild, was released on June 13, 2003.

== See also ==
- List of films featuring eclipses
