= Graceland (song) =

Single by Paul Simon

from the album Graceland
- B-side: "Hearts and Bones"
- Released: November 1986
- Recorded: November 1985
- Genre: Folk rock; worldbeat
- Length: 4:48
- Label: Warner Bros.
- Songwriter: Paul Simon
- Producer: Paul Simon

Paul Simon singles chronology
"You Can Call Me Al" (1986)	"Graceland" (1986)	"The Boy in the Bubble" (1987)

"Graceland" is the title song of the album Graceland, released in 1986 by Paul Simon. The song features vocals by the Everly Brothers. The lyrics follow the singer's thoughts during a road trip to Graceland after the failure of his marriage. Actress and author Carrie Fisher, Simon's ex-wife, said that the song referred in part to their relationship. An acoustic version of the song was included as a track on The Unplugged Collection, Volume One.

A cover by Willie Nelson peaked at number 70 on the Billboard Hot Country Singles & Tracks chart in 1993.

== Reception ==
Billboard said that "Remarkable supporting players from his South Africa sessions make Simon's multiple-meaning musings into something subtly exotic." Cashbox called it a "sparse, thin and taut" title track and praised Simon's lyricism on the song.

The song won the 1988 Grammy Award for Record of the Year. It was the lowest-charting song on any of the world music charts to win Record of the Year until the Robert Plant and Alison Krauss US non-charting song "Please Read the Letter" won the same award in 2009. In 2004, it was listed at number 485 on Rolling Stone's 500 Greatest Songs. In June 2026, CBS News included the song in its list of the 250 essential American songs of the past 250 years.

== Personnel ==
- Paul Simon – lead vocals, background vocals, acoustic guitar (uncredited)
- Ray Phiri – guitar
- Demola Adepoju – pedal steel
- Bakithi Kumalo – fretless bass
- Vusi Khumalo – drums
- Makhaya Mahlangu – percussion
- The Everly Brothers – guitars, additional vocals

== Charts ==
Chart (1986–87)	Peak position
Australia (Kent Music Report)	62
Belgium (Ultratop 50 Flanders)	35
Canada (RPM)	70
Canada Adult Contemporary (RPM)	14
Ireland (IRMA)	27
Netherlands (Single Top 100)	79
New Zealand (Recorded Music NZ)	37
UK Singles (OCC)	98
US Album Rock Tracks (Billboard)	38
US Billboard Hot 100	81

== Certifications ==
Region	Certification	Certified units/sales
New Zealand (RMNZ)	Platinum	30,000^{‡}
United Kingdom (BPI) Sales since 2010	Gold	400,000^{‡}
^{‡} Sales+streaming figures based on certification alone.
