= Graceland (album) =

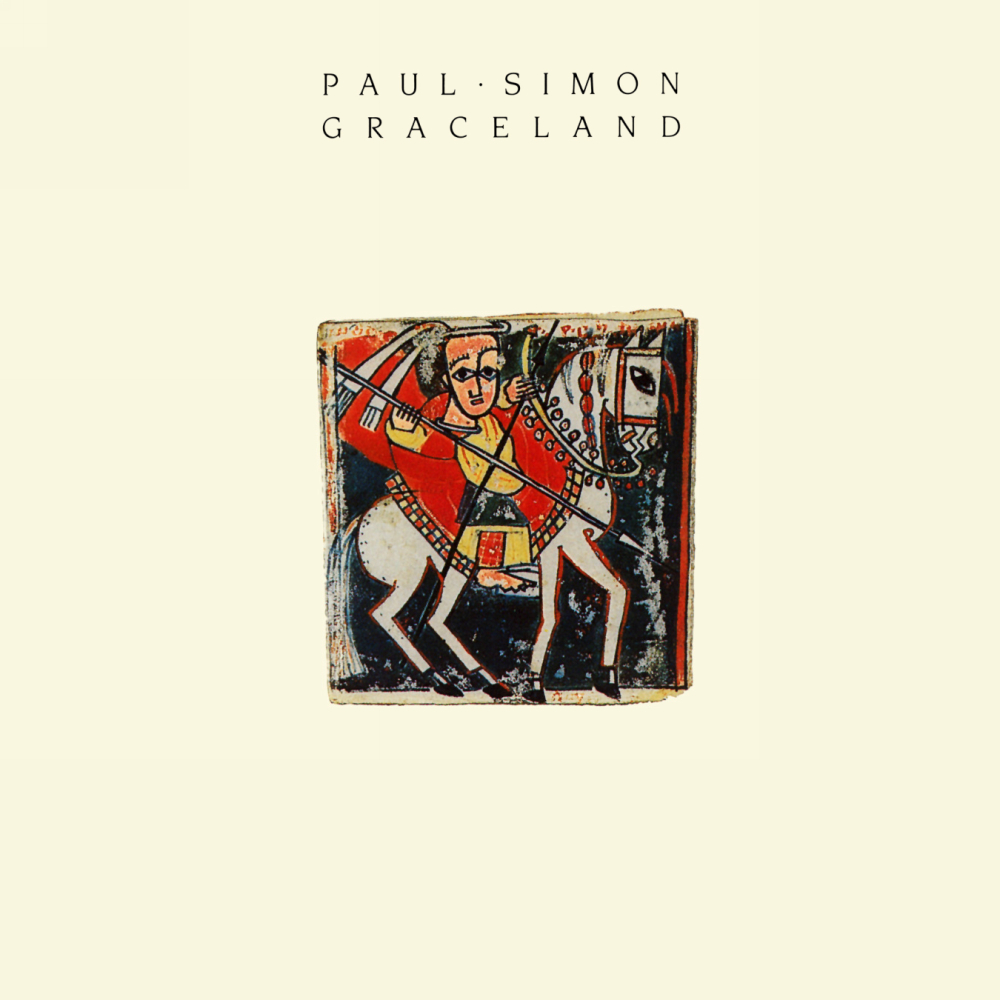

Studio album by Paul Simon
- Released: August 25, 1986
- Recorded: October 1985 – June 1986
- Studios: The Hit Factory (New York City); (London); (Los Angeles); (Louisiana); (South Africa)
- Genres: Worldbeat; pop; rock; folk; Afropop
- Length: 43:18
- Label: Warner Bros.
- Producer: Paul Simon

Paul Simon chronology
Hearts and Bones (1983)	Graceland (1986)	Negotiations and Love Songs (1988)

Singles from Graceland
- 1. "You Can Call Me Al" Released: July 1986; 2. "Graceland" Released: November 1986; 3. "The Boy in the Bubble" Released: February 17, 1987; 4. "Diamonds on the Soles of Her Shoes" Released: April 1987; 5. "Under African Skies" Released: August 1987

Graceland is the seventh solo studio album by the American singer-songwriter Paul Simon. It was produced by Simon, engineered by Roy Halee, and released on August 25, 1986, by Warner Bros. Records. It incorporates multiple genres, including pop, rock, a cappella, zydeco, and South African styles such as isicathamiya and mbaqanga.

In the early 1980s, Simon's relationship with his former musical partner Art Garfunkel had deteriorated, his marriage to the actress Carrie Fisher had collapsed, and his previous record, Hearts and Bones (1983), had been a commercial failure. In 1984, after a period of depression, Simon became fascinated by a bootleg cassette of mbaqanga, South African street music. He and Halee spent two weeks in Johannesburg recording with South African musicians. Further recordings were held in the US with American musicians, including Linda Ronstadt, the Everly Brothers, Rockin' Dopsie and the Twisters, and Los Lobos. Simon toured with South African musicians, performing their music and songs from Graceland.

Graceland became Simon's most successful album and his highest-charting album in over a decade, with estimated sales of more than 16 million copies worldwide. It won the 1987 Grammy for Album of the Year and is frequently cited as one of the best albums in history. In 2006, it was added to the US National Recording Registry as "culturally, historically, or aesthetically important".

Organizations such as Artists United Against Apartheid criticized Simon for breaking the cultural boycott on South Africa imposed for its policy of apartheid, while others accused him of appropriating the music of another culture. Simon responded that Graceland was a political statement that showcased collaboration between black and white people and raised international awareness of apartheid. Some praised him for helping popularize African music in the West.

== Background ==
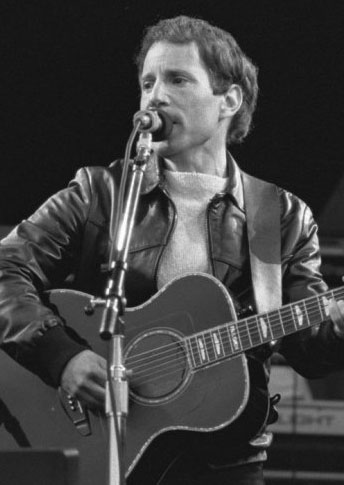
Paul Simon, seen here in 1982, underwent a personal and commercial downturn in the early 1980s.

Following a series of hit records released in the 1970s, Simon's career declined. His relationship with his former musical partner Art Garfunkel had again deteriorated; his sixth solo studio album, Hearts and Bones (1983), achieved the lowest sales of his career; and his marriage to the actress Carrie Fisher collapsed. He recalled: "I had a personal blow, a career setback, and the combination of the two put me into a tailspin".

In 1984, Simon agreed to produce an album by the Norwegian multi-instrumentalist Heidi Berg, who had played in the house band for Saturday Night Live and been the bandleader for the short-lived TV series The New Show. Berg was drawn to the cheerful accordion sound in mbaqanga, the Black African street music from Johannesburg's Soweto township, and wanted to fuse Western and African music. Without hearing the music, Simon advised Berg to travel to South Africa and contact local musicians. Berg had been inspired by a bootleg cassette mixtape of obscure South African songs, and lent the cassette to Simon. Berg stipulated that Simon return the tape in a week, as it was a continual source of ideas for her, but Simon kept it. He first listened to it on a drive to Montauk, New York, where he was having a summer home built. He called the tape "very good summer music, happy music" that reminded him of 1950s rhythm and blues. He began improvising melodies over it as he listened in his car, and decided to use it to make his own album.

Simon asked his contacts at his label, Warner, to identify the artists on the tape. Through the South African record producer Hilton Rosenthal, Warner confirmed that the music was South African and played by the Boyoyo Boys. (Note: According to some sources, this artist was Ladysmith Black Mambazo, but other sources, including the album's original liner notes and Simon himself, credit the Boyoyo Boys.) Simon considered buying the rights to his favorite song on the tape, "Gumboots", and using it to write his own song, as he had with the song "El Condor Pasa" in the 1960s. Instead, Rosenthal suggested that Simon record an album of South African music, and sent him dozens of records from South African artists.

In the 1980s, recording in South Africa was dangerous, and the United Nations had imposed a cultural boycott for its policy of apartheid, or forced racial segregation. The boycott forced states to "prevent all cultural, academic, sporting and other exchanges" with South Africa, and ordered writers, artists, musicians and "other personalities" to boycott it. Simon later told The New York Times: "I knew I would be criticized if I went, even though I wasn't going to record for the government ... or to perform for segregated audiences. I was following my musical instincts in wanting to work with people whose music I greatly admired."

Before leaving for Johannesburg, Simon contributed to "We Are the World", a charity single benefiting African famine relief. Simon discussed recording in South Africa with the "We Are the World" producers Quincy Jones and Harry Belafonte, who both encouraged him to go. Belafonte said he should first gain the approval of the African National Congress (ANC) to prevent trouble with apartheid concerns, but Simon said he did not want to make the project a political issue. The South African black musicians' union voted to let Simon come, as the exposure could benefit their music by placing it on an international stage. When Simon told Berg of his plans to record an album inspired by the tape she had lent him, their working relationship ended. She felt that Simon had taken her idea and left her with nothing.

== Recording ==
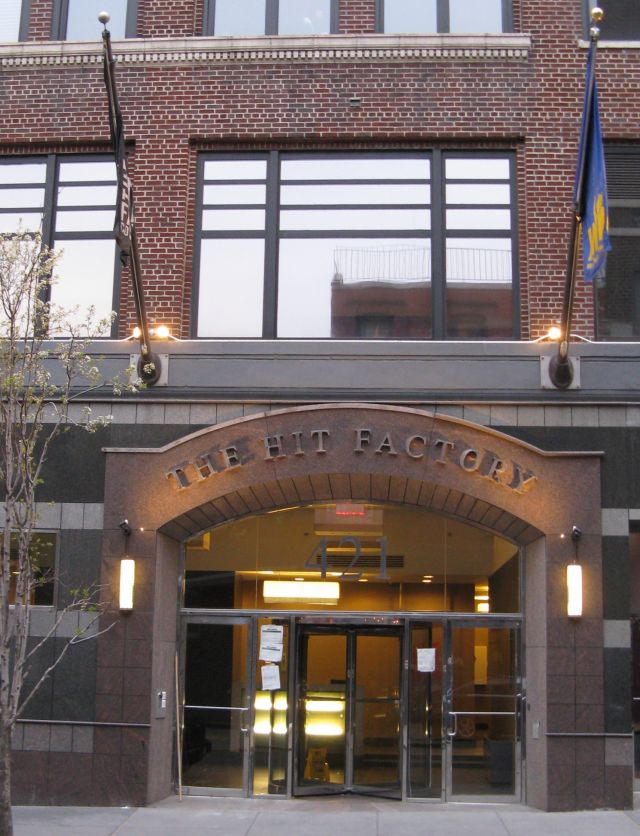
Later recordings and mixing took place at the Hit Factory in New York City.

In February 1985, Simon and his longtime engineer, Roy Halee, flew to Johannesburg, intending their visit to be secret. The Warner executives were uninterested in the project, viewing Simon as a bad investment due to the failure of his previous two solo albums. Simon felt their indifference worked in his favor, as it gave him more freedom. Halee believed the executives viewed him and Simon as "crazy".

Rosenthal used his connections to assemble musicians who had inspired Simon, including Lulu Masilela, Tao Ea Matsekha, General M. D. Shirinda and the Gaza Sisters and the Boyoyo Boys Band. Though musicians in Johannesburg were typically paid $15 an hour, Simon arranged to pay them $200 an hour, around triple the rate for top players in New York City. Simon said he "wanted to be as above board as I could possibly be", as many of the musicians did not know who he was and would not be lured by the promise of royalties alone. He also offered royalties to those he felt had contributed to composing songs.

Recording sessions took place at Ovation Studios. Halee worried the studio would be a "horror show" but was surprised to find it "very comfortable". He likened it to a garage, which Halee feared would be a problem for recording, and none of the musicians wore headphones. Jam sessions ranged from 10 to 30 minutes, and Simon and Halee intended to assemble an album from the recordings on their return home. Though the playing was technically simple, Simon found it difficult to mimic. Outside the studio, the public was hostile toward Simon, but the Musician's Union received him warmly.

Though Simon described the recording sessions as "euphoric", he recalled "tension below the surface" due to the effects of apartheid. The musicians would become anxious when recording continued into the evening, since they were prohibited from using public transportation or being on the streets after curfew. Simon recalled, "In the middle of the euphoric feeling in the studio, you would have reminders that you're living in an incredibly tense racial environment, where the law of the land was apartheid."

At the end of the two-week trip, Simon felt a relief from his personal turmoil and a revitalized passion for music. He and Halee returned to the Hit Factory studio in New York City to edit the material. Simon flew several South African musicians to New York to complete the record three months after the Johannesburg sessions. The sessions resulted in "You Can Call Me Al" and "Under African Skies". Simon began writing lyrics at his home in Montauk, New York, while listening to the recordings. The process was slow, but he determined he had sufficient material to begin rerecording. He played the tracks backward to "enhance their sound", interspersing gibberish to complete the rhythms.

Simon involved guest musicians, including the American singer Linda Ronstadt and his childhood heroes the Everly Brothers. During a trip to Louisiana with Richard "Dickie" Landry, Simon saw a performance by the Lafayette zydeco band Good Rockin' Dopsie and the Twisters, and recorded "That Was Your Mother" with them in a small studio behind a music store. He felt that the accordion, central to zydeco, would make a pleasing transition back to his own culture. Afterward, he contacted the Mexican-American band Los Lobos, with which he recorded "All Around the World or The Myth of Fingerprints" in Los Angeles.

Halee edited the album with new digital technology, transferring analog tape recordings to the digital workspace countless times. He said, "The amount of editing that went into that album was unbelievable ... without the facility to edit digital, I don't think we could have done that project." He used tape echo and delay on every song, and paid particular attention to the bass, saying, "The bassline is what the album is all about. It's the essence of everything that happened." Each song was mixed in about two days at the Hit Factory, where most of the vocal overdubs were recorded.

== Music ==
My typical style of songwriting in the past has been to sit with a guitar and write a song, finish it, go into the studio, book the musicians, lay out the song and the chords, and then try to make a track. With these musicians, I was doing it the other way around. The tracks preceded the songs. We worked improvisationally. While a group was playing in the studio, I would sing melodies and words—anything that fit the scale they were playing in.

— Paul Simon, 1986

Graceland incorporates genres including pop, rock, a cappella, zydeco, isicathamiya and mbaqanga. Mbaqanga, or "township jive", originated as the street music of Soweto, South Africa. The album was influenced by the work of the South African musicians Johnny Clegg and Sipho Mchunu, and their band Juluka's Zulu-Western pop crossover music. Juluka was South Africa's first integrated pop band. Simon includes thanks to Clegg, Juluka, and Juluka's producer Hilton Rosenthal in the liner notes. He included American "roots" influences with tracks featuring zydeco musicians such as Rockin' Dopsie and Tex-Mex musicians.

Graceland alternates between playful and more serious songs. Simon thought of it as like a play: "As in a play, the mood should keep changing. A serious song may lead into an abstract song, which may be followed by a humorous song." On many songs, Simon and Halee employ a Synclavier to "enhance" the acoustic instruments, creating an electronic "shadow".

"The Boy in the Bubble" is a collaboration with the Lesotho group Tau Ea Matsekha. "Graceland" features the bassist Bakithi Kumalo and the guitarist Ray Phiri. Simon wrote in the original liner notes that it reminded him of American country music, and wrote: "After the recording session, Ray told me that he'd used a relative minor chord—something not often heard in South African music—because he said he thought it was more like the chord changes he'd heard in my music." The steel guitarist Demola Adepoju contributed to the track some months after its completion. "I Know What I Know" is based on music from an album by General M. D. Shirinda and the Gaza Sisters. Simon was attracted to their work due to the unusual style of guitar playing, as well as the "distinctive sound" of the women's voices. "Gumboots" is a re-recording (with additional saxophone solos) of the song with which Simon first found himself enamored from the cassette tape that spawned Graceland.

"Graceland"
Graceland audio sample

Joseph Shabalala also contributed to "Diamonds on the Soles of Her Shoes", with Ladysmith Black Mambazo and the Senegalese singer-percussionist Youssou N'Dour. It was recorded a week following their appearance on Saturday Night Live. The pennywhistle solo featured on "You Can Call Me Al" was performed by Morris Goldberg, a white South African living in New York. "Homeless" was written jointly by Simon and Shabalala, the lead singer of Ladysmith Black Mambazo, to a melody from a traditional Zulu wedding song. In the song "Under African Skies", "the figure of Joseph becomes the dual image of a dispossessed African black man and the New Testament Joseph." For the song, Simon sent Shabalala a cassette demo, and the two later met at Abbey Road Studios in London, where the rest of the song was completed. "Crazy Love" features music from Stimela, Phiri's group that was very successful in South Africa.

== Lyrics ==
To write lyrics, Simon listened to the recordings made during his time in Johannesburg, identifying patterns in the music to fit to verses. He said:

It was very difficult, because patterns that seemed as though they should fit together often didn't. I realized that in African music, the rhythms are always shifting slightly and that the shape of a melody was often dictated by the bassline rather than the guitar. Harmonically, African music consists essentially of three major chords—that's why it sounds so happy—so I could write almost any melody I wanted in a major scale. I improvised in two ways—by making up melodies in falsetto, and by singing any words that came to mind down in my lower and mid range.

Simon told The Village Voice's Robert Christgau in 1986 that he was bad at writing about politics, and felt his strength was writing about relationships and introspection. In contrast to Hearts and Bones, Graceland's subject matter is more upbeat. Simon made an effort to write simply without compromising the language. Composing more personal songs took him significantly longer, as it involved "a lot of avoidance going on". Rewrites were necessary as Simon ended up using overcomplicated words. A perfectionist, Simon rewrote songs only to scrap the newer versions. Songs such as "Graceland" and "The Boy in the Bubble" took three to four months, while others, such as "All Around the World" and "Crazy Love", came together quickly.

"The Boy in the Bubble" discusses starvation and terrorism, but mixes this with wit and optimism. Simon concurred with this assessment: "Hope and dread—that's right. That's the way I see the world, a balance between the two, but coming down on the side of hope." The song retains a variation of the only lyric Simon composed on his South African trip: "The way the camera follows him in slo-mo, the way he smiled at us all." The imagery was inspired by the assassination of John F. Kennedy and the attempted assassination of Ronald Reagan. "Homeless" discusses poverty within the black majority in South Africa. According to Simon's ex-wife Carrie Fisher, the "Graceland" lines "She's come back to tell me she's gone / As if I didn't know that, as if I didn't know my own bed / As if I'd never noticed the way she brushed her hair from her forehead" refer to her. She confirmed she had a habit of brushing her hair from her forehead, and said she felt privileged to be in one of Simon's songs.

Throughout the recording process, Simon remained unsure of the album's thematic connection. He kept dozens of yellow legal pads with random words and phrases he would combine in an attempt to define the album. He derived the album title from the phrase "driving through Wasteland", which he changed to "going to Graceland", a reference to Elvis Presley's Memphis home. Simon believed it represented a spiritual direction: just as he had embarked on a physical journey to collect ideas in Africa, he would spiritually journey to the home of the rock "forefather" to revitalize his love for music.

== Allegations of plagiarism ==
"That Was Your Mother" features the American zydeco band Rockin' Dopsie and the Zydeco Twisters. The band leader, Alton Jay Rubin, felt Simon had derived it from his song "My Baby, She's Gone", but decided not to take legal action.

The American group Los Lobos appears on the track "All Around the World or the Myth of Fingerprints". The Los Lobos saxophone player, Steve Berlin, said Simon "stole" the song from them: "We go into the studio, and he had quite literally nothing. I mean, he had no ideas, no concepts, and said, "Well, let's just jam." ... Paul goes, "Hey, what's that?" We start playing what we have of it, and it is exactly what you hear on the record." He said Los Lobos had never received a song credit or payment.

According to Berlin, when he contacted Simon about the lack of credit, Simon responded, "Sue me. See what happens." Simon denied this, and said, "The album came out and we heard nothing. Then six months passed and Graceland had become a hit and the first thing I heard about the problem was when my manager got a lawyer's letter. I was shocked."

== Release ==
I don't like the idea that people who aren't adolescents make records. Adolescents make the best records. Except for Paul Simon. Except for Graceland. He's hit a new plateau there, but he's writing to his own age group. Graceland is something new. That song to his son is just as good as "Blue Suede Shoes": "Before you were born dude, when life was great." That's just as good as "Blue Suede Shoes," and that is a new dimension.

— Joe Strummer, in an interview with Richard Cromelin for the Los Angeles Times on January 31, 1988

Graceland was released by Warner Bros. with little promotion in August 1986. Before its release, Simon speculated that he was no longer "a viable commercial force in popular music".

By July 1987, Graceland had sold six million copies worldwide. That year, Rolling Stone's David Fricke said the album had become "a daily soundtrack in urban yuppie condos and suburban living rooms and on radio airwaves from Australia to Zimbabwe". In South Africa, it was the best-selling release since Michael Jackson's Thriller (1982). It sold 150,000 copies in Australia in 1988, and had sold 470,000 copies there by January 1989. As of 2014, Graceland was estimated to have sold more than 16 million copies.

In 2004, Graceland was reissued with three previously unreleased demo tracks. In 2011, it was reissued in a 25th-anniversary edition with further demos, a live concert DVD, and a documentary. In June 2018, Sony Music and Legacy Records issued Graceland: The Remixes, featuring remixes of Graceland songs by artists including Paul Oakenfold, Groove Armada, and Thievery Corporation.

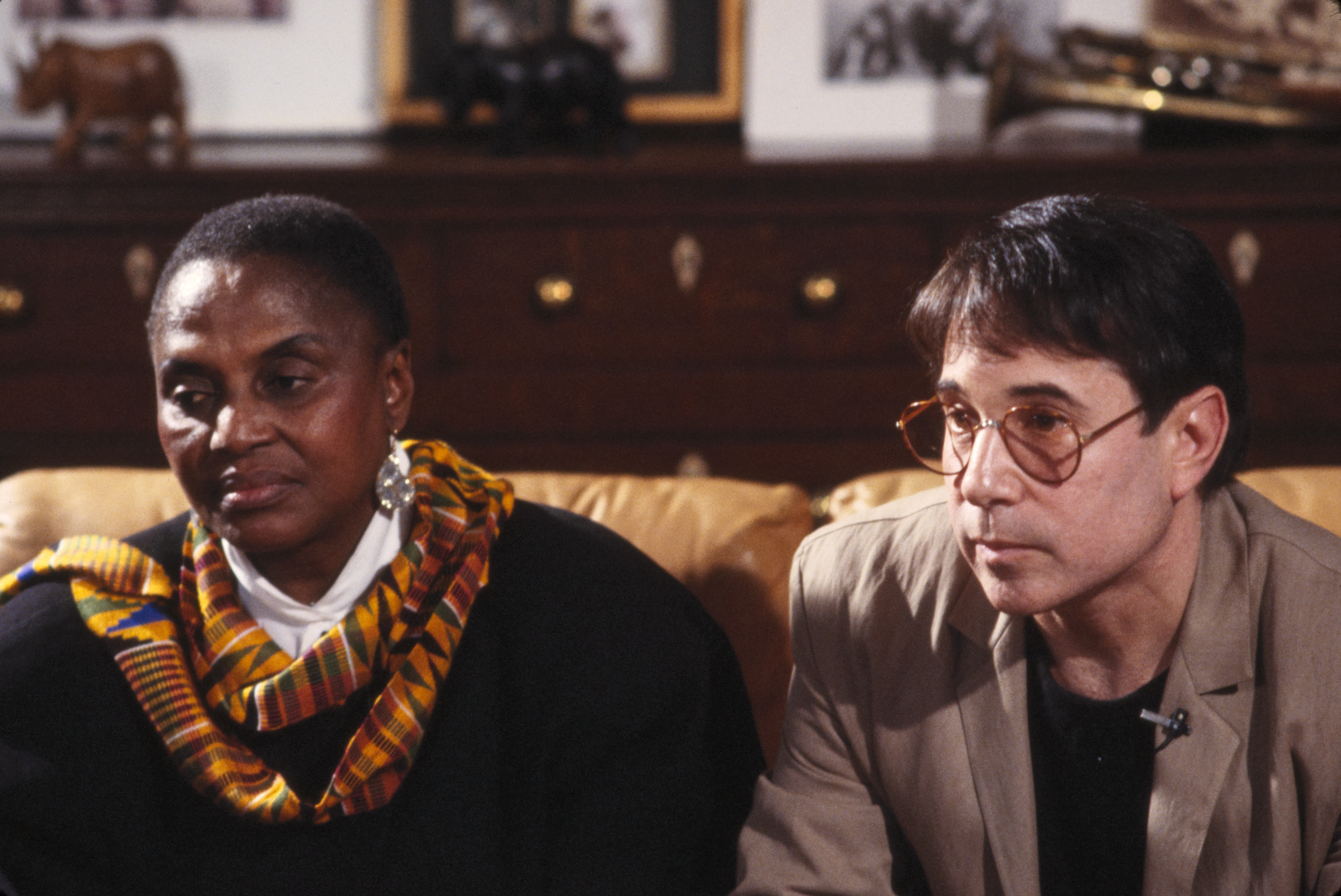
Miriam Makeba and Simon (1986)

== Tour ==
The Graceland tour began on February 1, 1987. Simon was accompanied by an ensemble of 24 black South Africans, including the singer Miriam Makeba, the trumpeter Hugh Masekela, the guitarist Ray Phiri, and Ladysmith Black Mambazo. To ensure the musicians were paid well, Simon took no payment, saying "the show breaks even as long as I don't get paid". The tour ended with two concerts in Harare, Zimbabwe, which were filmed for release as Graceland: The African Concert. Showtime aired these performances for a TV special and financed most of the costs associated with gear transportation, sound reinforcement, and recording.

== Critical reception ==
Retrospective professional ratings
Review scores
Source	Rating
AllMusic	5/5 stars
American Songwriter	5/5 stars
Blender	5/5 stars
Christgau's Record Guide	A
Entertainment Weekly	A
The Independent	5/5 stars
Pitchfork	9.2/10
Rolling Stone	5/5 stars
The Rolling Stone Album Guide	5/5 stars
Uncut	10/10

Graceland received widespread acclaim upon release. Rolling Stone's Rob Tannenbaum characterized it as "lovely, daring and accomplished". Stephen Holden of The New York Times wrote: "With his characteristic refinement, Mr. Simon has fashioned that event into the rock album equivalent of a work of literature." In The Village Voice, Robert Christgau deemed it Simon's best record since his 1972 self-titled album, as well as "a tremendously engaging and inspired piece of work". It went on to top The Village Voice's Pazz & Jop critics' poll for that year (1986).

Retrospective reviews have remained favorable. According to AllMusic's William Ruhlmann, "Graceland became the standard against which subsequent musical experiments by major artists were measured." Joe Tangari of Pitchfork wrote that "its songs transcend the context as listening experiences. These songs are astute and exciting, spit-shined with the gloss of production that bears a lot of hallmarks of the era but somehow has refused to age. Taken as a whole, the album offers tremendous insight into how we live in our world and how that changes as we get older." Patrick Humphries of BBC Music wrote that "it may well stand as the pinnacle of his remarkable half-century career ... Simon fashioned a record which was truly, blindingly original, and – listening to it a quarter of a century on – modern and timeless." Andy Gill of The Independent wrote: "The character of the base music here is overwhelming: complex, ebullient and life-affirming, and in yoking this intricate dance music to his sophisticated New Yorker sensibility, Simon created a transatlantic bridge that neither pandered to nor patronised either culture."

=== Accolades ===
Graceland earned Simon the Best International Solo Artist award at the 1987 Brit Awards. It was ranked No. 84 in a 2005 survey by British television's Channel 4 to determine the 100 greatest albums of all time.

Graceland was ranked 81st on the 2003 list of Rolling Stone magazine's 500 Greatest Albums of All Time, as "an album about isolation and redemption that transcended 'world music' to become the whole world's soundtrack." The ranking increased to 71st in the 2012 revision and 46th in the 2020 list. In 2000 it was voted number 43 in Colin Larkin's All Time Top 1000 Albums. The song "Graceland" was named #485 in the 2004 list of Rolling Stone's 500 Greatest Songs of All Time. In 2006, Graceland was added to the US National Recording Registry as "culturally, historically, or aesthetically important".

Year	Publication	Country	Rank	List
1986
1986	Rolling Stone	US	*	The Year In Records
1986	The Village Voice	US	1	Albums of the Year
1986	New Musical Express	UK	6	Albums of the Year
1986	Q	UK	*	Albums of the Year
1987	Stereo Review	US	*	Record of the Year Awards
1987	Rolling Stone	US	56	The Best Albums of the Last Twenty Years
1989	Rolling Stone	US	5	The 100 Best Albums of the Eighties
1993	Entertainment Weekly	US	4	The 100 Greatest CDs of All Time
1997	The Guardian	UK	69	The 100 Best Albums Ever
1999	NPR	US	*	The 300 Most Important American Records of the 20th Century
2002	Blender	US	60	The 100 Greatest American Albums of All-Time
2002	Pitchfork	US	85	Top 100 Favorite Records of the 1980s
2003	USA Today	US	26	Top 40 Albums of All Time
2003	Rolling Stone	US	81	The 500 Greatest Albums of All Time
2006	Q	UK	39	The 80 Best Records of the 80s.
2006	Time	US	*	All-Time 100 Albums
2012	Slant Magazine	US	19	Best Albums of the 1980s
2020	Rolling Stone	US	46	The 500 Greatest Albums of All Time

=== Grammy Awards ===
Year	Nominee / work	Award	Result
1987	Graceland	Album of the Year	Won
1987	Graceland	Best Pop Vocal Performance, Male	Nominated
1987	"Graceland"	Song of the Year	Nominated
1988	"Graceland"	Record of the Year	Won

== Criticism from anti-apartheid movement ==
"What was unusual about Graceland is that it was on the surface apolitical, but what it represented was the essence of the anti-apartheid in that it was a collaboration between blacks and whites to make music that people everywhere enjoyed. It was completely the opposite from what the apartheid regime said, which is that one group of people were inferior. Here, there were no inferiors or superiors, just an acknowledgement of everybody's work as a musician. It was a powerful statement."

— Simon

After Graceland's success, Simon was criticized by organizations such as Artists United Against Apartheid, anti-apartheid musicians including Billy Bragg, Paul Weller and Jerry Dammers, and James Victor Gbeho, the Ghanaian Ambassador to the United Nations. They condemned him for having potentially damaged anti-apartheid solidarity by breaking the cultural boycott against apartheid in South Africa.

Before going to South Africa, Simon sought advice from Harry Belafonte, with whom he had recently collaborated on "We Are the World". Belafonte had mixed feelings and advised him to discuss the matter with the African National Congress (ANC). At a launch party for Graceland, Simon said of the criticism: "I'm with the artists. I didn't ask the permission of the ANC. I didn't ask permission of Buthelezi, or Desmond Tutu, or the Pretoria government. And to tell you the truth, I have a feeling that when there are radical transfers of power on either the left or the right, the artists always get screwed."

James Victor Gbeho, the former Ghanaian ambassador to the UN, was critical, saying: "When he goes to South Africa, Paul Simon bows to apartheid. He lives in designated hotels for whites. He spends money the way whites have made it possible to spend money there. The money he spends goes to look after white society, not to the townships." Simon denied that he went to South Africa to "take money out of the country", saying he paid the black artists well and split royalties with them, and was not paid to play to a white audience. The South African guitarist Ray Phiri said: "We used Paul as much as Paul used us. There was no abuse. He came at the right time and he was what we needed to bring our music into the mainstream."

Some criticized Simon for not addressing apartheid in his lyrics. Simon responded: "Was I supposed to solve things in a song?" He said he was not good at writing protest songs in the vein of Bob Dylan or Bob Geldof, and felt that although it was not overtly political, Graceland was its own political statement: "I still think it's the most powerful form of politics, more powerful than saying it right on the money, in which case you're usually preaching to the converted. People get attracted to the music, and once they hear what's going on within it, they say, 'What? They're doing that to these people?'"

The United Nations Anti-Apartheid Committee supported Graceland, as it showcased black South African musicians and offered no support to the South African government, but the ANC protested it as a violation of the boycott. The ANC voted to ban Simon from South Africa and he was added to the United Nations blacklist. He was removed from the blacklist in January 1987, and announced that he had been cleared by the ANC, but the Artists Against Apartheid founder, Dali Tambo, denied this. The Graceland concert at London's Royal Albert Hall prompted protests from Dammers, Weller and Bragg. In 2012, the controversy was revived when Simon returned to London for a 25th-anniversary concert.

Graceland introduced some of the musicians, especially Ladysmith Black Mambazo, to global audiences. Hugh Masekela, one of South Africa's most prominent musicians and an exiled opponent of apartheid, praised Simon for encouraging black South African music. The South African jazz musician Jonas Gwangwa criticized the notion that Simon deserved praise: "So, it has taken another white man to discover my people?"

Some critics viewed Graceland as colonialist, with Simon appropriating the music of another culture to bring to the global market. The Star-Ledger reporter Tris McCall wrote in 2012: "Does it complicate matters to realize that these musicians were second-class citizens in their own country, one groaning under the weight of apartheid? How could Simon approach them as equal partners when their own government demanded that they treat him as a superior?" In 2012, Andrew Mueller of Uncut wrote: "Apartheid was of course a monstrosity, but it would be absurd to suggest that Simon's introduction of South Africa's music to the world prolonged it and quite plausible to suggest that it did some small amount to hasten its undoing."

=== Linda Ronstadt ===
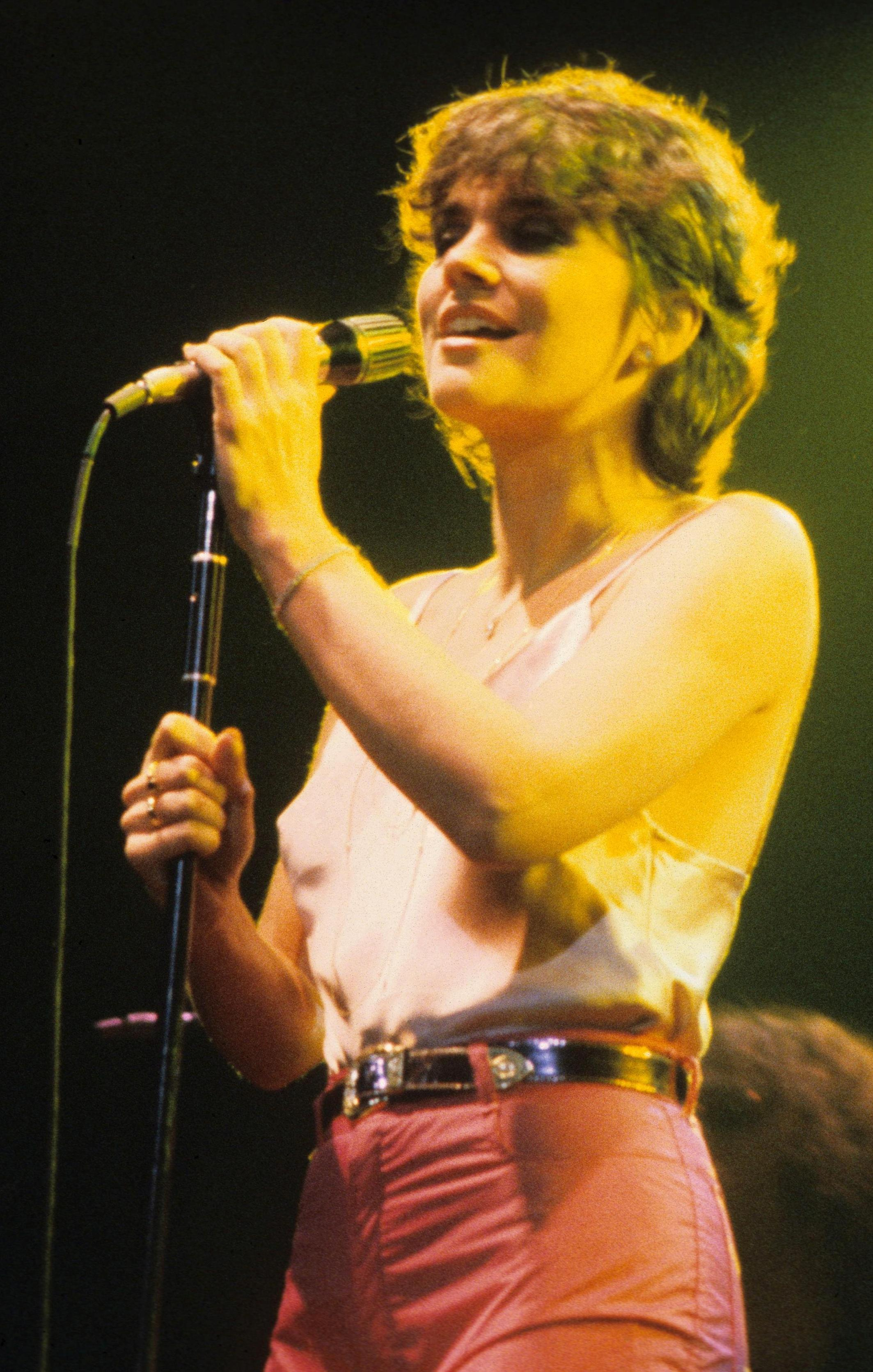
Simon was criticized for working with Linda Ronstadt (pictured in the 1970s), as she had performed in South Africa.

Simon's choice to feature the American singer Linda Ronstadt on "Under African Skies" was criticized, as three years earlier she had accepted $500,000 to perform at Sun City, a South African luxury resort. Nelson George of Billboard said her inclusion on Graceland was like "using gasoline to put out birthday candles", and Robert Christgau wrote: "Even if the lyric called for total US divestiture, Ronstadt's presence on Graceland would be a slap in the face to the world anti-apartheid movement."

Simon defended Ronstadt, saying: "I know that her intention was never to support the government there ... She made a mistake. She's extremely liberal in her political thinking and unquestionably anti-apartheid." He told Spin he did not think Ronstadt would play at Sun City again, and did not think she was "incompatible" with the record.

Simon had refused to perform on the 1985 anti-apartheid single "Sun City", as the demo had included a list of names shaming artists who had performed at the resort, including Ronstadt's, and as he felt Graceland would be "my own statement". He said he had refused two offers to perform at Sun City, and drew a distinction between going to South Africa to perform for a segregated audience, which he felt was unacceptable, and going to record.

=== Threats against Simon ===
The cultural boycott against South Africa was lifted in 1991, five years after Graceland's release. At the invitation of the anti-apartheid activist Nelson Mandela and with the support of the African National Congress, Simon and his band played five shows, beginning at Ellis Park Stadium in Johannesburg. Before the first concert, hand grenades were thrown into the office of the promoter, Attie van Wyk, who had booked the shows. A sect of the militant Azanian People's Organisation (AZAPO) claimed responsibility for the attack, which destroyed the office but caused no injuries.

Simon held a clandestine meeting with AZAPO representatives, offering them proceeds from the tour, but no agreement was reached. At a press conference, AZAPO said there was "potential for violence" if the show proceeded. Though hundreds of protesters threatened violence at one concert, it was protected by 800 policemen and proceeded without incident.

According to the guitarist Steven Van Zandt, who was involved in the anti-apartheid movement and met with AZAPO representatives, Simon had been "at the top" of AZAPO's assassination list. Van Zandt said he persuaded them that murdering Simon would not help them achieve their goals, and mollified them by saying he was attempting to unite the music community against apartheid.

== Legacy ==
The New York Times writer Jon Pareles said Graceland popularized African rock in the west, alongside albums such as Peter Gabriel's So (1986) and Talking Heads' Remain in Light (1980). A 2012 documentary film, Under African Skies, was directed by Joe Berlinger for the album's 25th anniversary, and includes archival footage, interviews, discussion of the controversy, and coverage of an anniversary reunion concert.

Advocates for Graceland feel its music transcends the racial and cultural barriers of its production. Andrew Leahey of American Songwriter wrote that "Graceland was never just a collection of songs, after all; it was a bridge between cultures, genres and continents, not to mention a global launching pad for the musicians whose popularity had been suppressed under South Africa's white-run apartheid rule." Presenting the album in a modern context, Tris McCall of the Star-Ledger wrote: "In a sense, Simon was ahead of his time: the curatorial approach he took to assembling full tracks from scraps of songs and pre-existing recordings is closer in execution to that of Kanye West than it is to any of his contemporaries." In 2012, Rolling Stone wrote that it was "hard to even remember the charges of cultural imperialism that greeted Graceland when it was released". Pitchfork wrote that "it was unique in its total, and totally natural, synthesis of musical strains that turned out to be not nearly as different from each other as its listeners might have expected, and the result resonated strongly around the world and across generations".

The album has influenced musicians including Regina Spektor, Bombay Bicycle Club, Gabby Young, Casiokids, the Very Best, Givers, Lorde and Vampire Weekend. Vampire Weekend faced criticism that their 2008 debut album was too similar to Graceland, due to its origins in African music. Simon defended them, saying: "In a way, we were on the same pursuit, but I don't think you're lifting from me, and anyway, you're welcome to it, because everybody's lifting all the time. That's the way music grows and is shaped."

Simon said in 2013:

There was the almost mystical affection and strange familiarity I felt when I first heard South African music. Later, there was the visceral thrill of collaborating with South African musicians onstage. Add to this potent mix the new friendships I made with my band mates, and the experience becomes one of the most vital in my life.

== Track listing ==
All tracks written by Paul Simon, except where noted.

Side one
No.	Title	Writer(s)	Length
1.	"The Boy in the Bubble"	Forere Motloheloa, Simon	3:59
2.	"Graceland"		4:48
3.	"I Know What I Know" (with General MD Shirinda and the Gaza Sisters)	General MD Shirinda, Simon	3:13
4.	"Gumboots" (with the Boyoyo Boys)	Lulu Masilela, Jonhjon Mkhalali, Simon	2:44
5.	"Diamonds on the Soles of Her Shoes" (with Ladysmith Black Mambazo)	Joseph Shabalala, Simon	5:45
Total length:			20:29

Side two
No.	Title	Writer(s)	Length
6.	"You Can Call Me Al"		4:39
7.	"Under African Skies"		3:37
8.	"Homeless" (with Ladysmith Black Mambazo)	Shabalala, Simon	3:48
9.	"Crazy Love, Vol. II" (with Stimela)		4:18
10.	"That Was Your Mother" (with Good Rockin' Dopsie and the Twisters)		2:52
11.	"All Around the World or the Myth of Fingerprints" (with Los Lobos)		3:15
Total length:			22:29 42:58

== Personnel ==
Track numbering refers to CD and digital releases of this album.

- Paul Simon – lead vocals; backing vocals (1, 2, 4, 6, 9), acoustic guitar (1, 2, 11), Synclavier (3, 4), guitars (3, 5, 7), six-string bass (6)

Additional musicians

- Bakithi Kumalo – bass (1, 2, 5, 6, 7)
- Adrian Belew – guitar synthesizer (1, 6, 9), guitars (7)
- Rob Mounsey – synthesizers (1, 6), horn arrangements (6) [uncredited on album]
- Vusi Khumalo – drums (1, 2)
- Makhaya Mahlangu – percussion (1, 2)
- Forere Motloheloa – accordion (1)
- Ray Phiri – guitars (2, 5, 6, 7, 9)
- Demola Adepoju – pedal steel guitar (2)
- The Everly Brothers – vocals (2)
- The Gaza Sisters – vocals (3)
- Ralph MacDonald – percussion (4, 6, 7, 11)
- The Boyoyo Boys
  - Jonhjon Mkhalali – accordion (4)
  - Daniel Xilakazi – lead and rhythm guitar (4)
  - Petrus Manile – drums (4)
  - Lulu Masilela – tambourine (4)
  - Barney Rachabane – saxophone (4)
  - Mike Makhalemele – saxophone (4)
  - Teaspoon Ndelu – saxophone (4)
- Michelle Cobbs – vocals (4)
- Diane Garisto – vocals (4)
- Isaac Mtshali – drums (5, 6, 7, 9)
- Ladysmith Black Mambazo – vocals (5, 6, 8)
- Youssou N'Dour – percussion (5)
- Babacar Faye – percussion (5)
- Assane Thiam – percussion (5)
- Alex Foster – alto saxophone (5)
- Lenny Pickett – tenor saxophone (5)
- Earl Gardner – trumpet (5)
- Ronnie Cuber – baritone and bass saxophones (6)
- Morris Goldberg – penny whistle (6), soprano saxophone (9)
- Dave Bargeron – trombone (6)
- Kim Allan Cissel – trombone (6)
- Randy Brecker – trumpet (6)
- Jon Faddis – trumpet (6)
- Alan Rubin – trumpet (6)
- Lew Soloff – trumpet (6)
- Linda Ronstadt – lead vocals (7)
- Joseph Shabalala – lead vocals (8)
- Lloyd Lelosa – bass (9)
- Good Rockin' Dopsie and the Twisters
  - Alton Rubin Sr. – accordion (10)
  - Sherman Robertson – guitars (10)
  - Alonzo Johnson – bass (10)
  - Alton Rubin Jr. – drums (10)
  - Johnny Hoyt – saxophone (10)
  - David Rubin – washboard (10)
- Los Lobos
  - David Hidalgo – accordion, guitars, vocals (11)
  - César Rosas– guitars, vocals (11)
  - Conrad Lozano – bass (11)
  - Louie Pérez – drums (11)
  - Steve Berlin – saxophone (11)
- Steve Gadd – additional drums (11)

Technical

- Paul Simon – producer, arrangements, liner notes
- Ray Phiri – co-arrangements
- Roy Halee – engineer
- Mark Cobrin – assistant engineer (1–7, 9, 11)
- Peter Thwaites – assistant engineer (1–4, 9)
- Steven Strassman – assistant engineer (2, 7, 11)
- Andrew Fraser – assistant engineer (8)
- Greg Calbi – mastering at Sterling Sound (New York City, New York)
- Jeffrey Kent Ayeroff – art direction
- Jeri McManus – art direction
- Kim Champagne – design
- Mark Sexton – front cover photography
- Gary Heery – back cover photography

== Charts ==
=== Weekly charts ===
Original release
Chart (1986–87)	Position
Australian Kent Music Report Chart	1
Austrian Albums Chart	3
Canadian Albums Chart	1
Dutch Albums Chart	1
European Top 100 Albums	1
Finnish Albums Chart	6
French Albums Chart	1
Japanese Albums Chart	46
New Zealand Albums Chart	1
Norwegian Albums Chart	13
Spanish Albums Chart	15
Swedish Albums Chart	13
Swiss Albums Chart	1
UK Albums Chart	1
US Billboard Pop Albums	3
West German Albums Chart	2
Zimbabwean Albums Chart	1

25th Anniversary Edition
Chart (2012)	Position
Australian Albums Chart	12
Belgian Albums Chart (Flanders)	43
Belgian Albums Chart (Wallonia)	31
Croatian Albums Chart	29
Danish Albums Chart	24
Dutch Albums Chart	4
German Albums Chart	91
Irish Albums Chart	3
Japanese Albums Chart	167
New Zealand Albums Chart	15
Norwegian Albums Chart	6
Spanish Albums Chart	37
Swedish Albums Chart	4
UK Albums Chart	4
US Billboard 200	51
US Billboard Top Catalog Albums	3

=== Year-end charts ===
Chart (1986)	Position
Australian Albums Chart	22
Dutch Albums Chart	14
Canadian Albums Chart	21
New Zealand Albums (RMNZ)	20
UK Albums Chart	4
Chart (1987)	Position
Australian Albums Chart	4
Austrian Albums Chart	12
Canadian Albums Chart	4
Dutch Albums Chart	2
French Albums Chart	19
New Zealand Albums (RMNZ)	2
Swiss Albums Chart	3
UK Albums Chart	14
US Albums Chart	2
Chart (2012)	Position
Dutch Albums Chart	89
Swedish Albums Chart	84

=== Decade-end charts ===
Chart (1980–89)	Position
Australian Albums Chart	11
UK Albums Chart	13

== Certifications and sales ==
Region	Certification	Certified units/sales
Australia (ARIA)	8× Platinum	560,000^{^}
Brazil	—	100,000
Denmark (IFPI Danmark)	Gold	10,000^{‡}
France (SNEP)	Platinum	300,000^{*}
Germany (BVMI)	3× Gold	750,000^{^}
Hong Kong (IFPI Hong Kong)	Gold	10,000^{*}
Italy (AFI)	Gold	100,000
Netherlands (NVPI)	Platinum	100,000^{^}
New Zealand (RMNZ)	2× Platinum	30,000^{‡}
South Africa (RISA)	3× Platinum	150,000
Spain (Promusicae)	Platinum	100,000^{^}
Switzerland (IFPI Switzerland)	Platinum	50,000^{^}
United Kingdom (BPI)	9× Platinum	2,700,000^{‡}
United States (RIAA)	5× Platinum	5,000,000^{^}
Summaries
Worldwide	—	14,000,000
^{*} Sales figures based on certification alone.^{^} Shipments figures based on certification alone.^{‡} Sales+streaming figures based on certification alone.
