= You're the One (Paul Simon album) =

- Cover art by Lynn Goldsmith

Studio album by Paul Simon
- Released: October 3, 2000
- Recorded: 1999–2000
- Studio: The Hit Factory (New York City)
- Genres: Pop, folk rock, worldbeat
- Length: 44:09
- Label: Warner Bros.
- Producer: Paul Simon

Paul Simon chronology
Greatest Hits: Shining Like a National Guitar (2000)	You're the One (2000)	The Paul Simon Collection: On My Way, Don't Know Where I'm Goin' (2002)

Professional ratings
Review scores
Source	Rating
AllMusic	3/5 stars
Robert Christgau	(choice cut)
Rolling Stone	4/5 stars
Q	(Nov 2000 p.109)

You're the One is the tenth solo studio album by the American singer-songwriter Paul Simon, released in 2000 by Warner Bros. Records. The album was nominated for a Grammy Award for Album of the Year in 2001, and Simon become the first artist to be nominated in that category in five consecutive decades (1960s–2000s). (In 2006, Paul McCartney became the only other artist to match this feat with Chaos and Creation in the Backyard.)

You're the One was also considered a comeback after the failure of Simon's Broadway musical, The Capeman, and concept album for the musical, Songs from The Capeman, which peaked at No. 42 on the Billboard 200.

== Track listing ==
All songs written and arranged by Paul Simon.

1. "That's Where I Belong" – 3:12
2. "Darling Lorraine" – 6:39
3. "Old" – 2:20
4. "You're the One" – 4:28
5. "The Teacher" – 3:36
6. "Look at That" – 3:54
7. "Señorita with a Necklace of Tears" – 3:42
8. "Love" – 3:50
9. "Pigs, Sheep and Wolves" – 3:59
10. "Hurricane Eye" – 4:12
11. "Quiet" – 4:17

== Personnel ==
Credits adapted from CD liner notes.

Musicians

- Paul Simon – electric guitar (1–4, 6–8, 10), acoustic guitar (7–8, 10), sitar guitar (8)
- Vincent Nguini – electric guitar (1–4, 6, 8–10), acoustic guitar (10)
- Bakithi Kumalo – bass guitar (1–4, 7–9)
- Steve Gadd – drums (1–7, 9–10)
- Jamey Haddad – percussion (1–10)
- Steve Shehan – percussion (1–10)
- Alain Mallet – Wurlitzer piano (1), pump reed organ (4, 7, 11)
- Evan Ziporyn – bass clarinet (1, 5), tenor saxophone (2, 4), soprano saxophone (3)
- Steve Gorn – bamboo flute (1, 5–6, 8)
- Jay Elfenbein – vihuela (1–2, 11), vielle (1)
- Mark Stewart – cello (2), electric guitar (2), dobro (7, 9), sitar guitar (7), pedal steel gong (9), banjo (10), tromba doo (11)
- Clifford Carter – celeste (2, 6, 10), keyboard glockenspiel (10)
- Peter Herbert – upright bass (4, 11)
- Larry Campbell – pedal steel guitar (5, 6)
- Abraham Laboriel – bass guitar (5–6, 10)
- Howard Levy – harmonica (5)
- Skip LaPlante – 96-tone harp (7, 11), whirly pipe (11), rubbed steel bowl (11)
- Dan Duggan – hammer dulcimer (10)
- Andy Snitzer – tenor saxophone (2, 4), soprano saxophone (3)

Technical

- Paul Simon – producer, arrangements
- Andy Smith – engineer, mixing
- Claudius Mittendorfer – second engineer
- Rob Murphy – second engineer
- Steve Schweidel – second engineer
- Bob Ludwig – mastering
- Stanley Silverman – French horn arrangements (2, 5)
- Lynn Goldsmith – photography, art direction
- Greg Foley – design

== Charts and certifications ==
=== Weekly charts ===
Chart performance for You're the One
Chart (2000)	Peak position
Australian Albums (ARIA)	134
Austrian Albums (Ö3 Austria)	30
Belgian Albums (Ultratop Flanders)	27
Canada Top Albums/CDs (RPM)	8
Dutch Albums (Album Top 100)	41
French Albums (SNEP)	73
German Albums (Offizielle Top 100)	17
Irish Albums (IRMA)	27
Italian Albums (FIMI)	30
Japanese Albums (Oricon)	9
Norwegian Albums (VG-lista)	9
Scottish Albums (Official Charts)	25
Swedish Albums (Sverigetopplistan)	24
Swiss Albums (Schweizer Hitparade)	40
UK Albums (Official Charts)	20
US Billboard 200	19

=== Certifications ===
Certifications for You're the One
Region	Certification	Certified units/sales
Australia (ARIA)	Gold	7,500^{^}
United Kingdom (BPI)	Silver	60,000^{^}
United States (RIAA)	Gold	500,000^{^}
^{^} Shipments figures based on certification alone.
