= The Boy in the Bubble =

Single by Paul Simon

from the album Graceland
- Released: February 17, 1987
- Recorded: October 1985
- Genre: Pop rock; folk rock; worldbeat; Afropop
- Length: 4:00
- Label: Warner Bros.
- Composers: Paul Simon; Forere Motloheloa
- Lyricist: Paul Simon
- Producer: Paul Simon

Paul Simon singles chronology
"Graceland" (1986)	"The Boy in the Bubble" (1987)	"Diamonds on the Soles of Her Shoes" (1987)

"The Boy in the Bubble" is a song by the American singer-songwriter Paul Simon. It was the third single from his seventh studio album, Graceland (1986), released on Warner Bros. Records. Written by Simon and Forere Motloheloa (an accordionist from Lesotho), its lyrics explore starvation and terrorism, juxtaposed with wit and optimism.

The single—released in February 1987—performed well on charts worldwide. In the United States, it was mainly successful on the Album Rock Tracks chart, where it peaked at No. 15. Outside the U.S., "The Boy in the Bubble" was a top 20 hit in the Netherlands, and top 30 in the United Kingdom and Belgium.

== Background ==
The song retains the only lyric Simon managed to compose on his South African trip: "The way the camera follows us in slo-mo, the way we look to us all." The imagery in the video, directed by Jim Blashfield, was inspired by film clips of the John F. Kennedy assassination, as well as Ronald Reagan's attempted assassination. Adrian Belew was asked to play guitar synthesizer on the song and recalled that Simon only had a few lyrics complete by the time he met with Belew.

The song's title was inspired by the medical cases of David Vetter and Ted DeVita. Similar to "Graceland", "The Boy in the Bubble" took between three and four months to complete.

== Critical reception ==
Cash Box said it was "another brilliant cross-cultural gem. African rhythms, zydeco spice and Simon's intelligent, penetrating lyrics are near perfection." In its review of the 25th anniversary edition of Graceland, Pitchfork wrote that the song was "a thriller that ties together threads of technological progress, medicine, terrorism, surveillance, pop music, inequality, and superstition with little more than a series of sentence fragments, all tossed off in the same deadpan delivery."

== Personnel ==
- Paul Simon – lead vocals, acoustic guitar
- Ladysmith Black Mambazo – background vocals
- Rob Mounsey – synthesizer
- Adrian Belew – guitar synthesizer
- Forere Motloheloa – accordion
- Bakithi Kumalo – bass
- Vusi Khumalo – drums
- Jacob Childress – percussion

== Chart performance ==
"The Boy in the Bubble" charted in several territories worldwide. In the U.S., the song reached a peak of No. 86 on the Billboard Hot 100 on March 21, 1987; it spent four weeks on the chart as a whole. It performed better on the magazine's Album Rock Tracks chart, where it placed at No. 15 on March 28, 1987, and spent nine weeks total on the listing.

In the United Kingdom, the song premiered on the UK Singles Chart on November 30, 1986, at number 81, and rose over the following weeks to a peak of No. 26 on January 11, 1987. On the Dutch Nationale Top 100, it reached a peak of No. 16. On Belgium's Ultratop 50, it hit No. 28, and in New Zealand, it peaked at No. 43.

== Charts ==
Chart (1987)	Peak position
Australia (Kent Music Report)	46
Belgium (Ultratop 50 Flanders)	28
Netherlands (Single Top 100)	16
New Zealand (Recorded Music NZ)	33
UK Singles (Official Charts)	26
UK Airplay (Music & Media)	2
US Billboard Hot 100	86
US Album Rock Tracks (Billboard)	15

== Notes ==
=== Sources ===
- Bennighof, James (2007). The Words and Music of Paul Simon. Greenwood Publishing Group. ISBN 978-0-275-99163-0.
- Eliot, Marc (2010). Paul Simon: A Life. John Wiley and Sons. ISBN 978-0-470-43363-8.
- Kingston, Victoria (2000). Simon & Garfunkel: The Biography. Fromm International. ISBN 978-0-88064-246-0.
