= Diamonds on the Soles of Her Shoes =

1987 worldbeat single by Paul Simon

Single by Paul Simon

from the album Graceland
- B-side: "I Know What I Know"
- Released: April 1987
- Genre: Worldbeat
- Length: 5:45
- Label: Warner Bros.
- Songwriters: Joseph Shabalala; Paul Simon
- Producer: Paul Simon

Paul Simon singles chronology
"The Boy in the Bubble" (1987)	"Diamonds on the Soles of Her Shoes" (1987)	"Under African Skies" (1987)

"Diamonds on the Soles of Her Shoes" is a song by the American singer-songwriter Paul Simon. It was the fourth single from his seventh studio album, Graceland (1986), released on Warner Bros. Records. The song features guest vocals from the South African male choral group Ladysmith Black Mambazo.

== Background ==
"Diamonds on the Soles of Her Shoes" was written when Simon went to South Africa. While he was there, he gathered various music from locals. Upon returning to New York, Simon finished the album with the artists he brought back from South Africa, according to Simon's account in the Classic Albums documentary on the making of Graceland.

Simon recalled that "Diamonds" was not originally planned for inclusion on Graceland. When Simon, Ladysmith Black Mambazo, and several of the South African studio musicians arrived in New York to perform on the May 10th episode of Saturday Night Live, which Simon was set to host, his label, Warner Bros., decided to release the album in the fall instead of the originally planned release that July. Simon and engineer Roy Halee then decided, with most of the major players involved in the recordings in town, to record "Diamonds", and to include it on the album.

Simon and Ladysmith Black Mambazo performed the song live during their second appearance on Saturday Night Live on November 22, 1986. During the performance, Simon sang live to the backing instrumental track featured on the album while Ladysmith mimed their parts. Ladysmith Black Mambazo sing in Zulu on the studio track. Their refrain roughly translates to: "It's not usual but in our days we see those things happen. They are women, they can take care of themselves."

"Diamonds on the Soles of Her Shoes" and "Homeless" were both rerecorded by Ladysmith Black Mambazo for the 2006 album Long Walk to Freedom.

Cashbox called "Diamonds on the Soles of Her Shoes" a "sweet, ethnic and graceful tune" and said that "Simon’s loaded lyrical political blast is laced, unsuspectingly, across the song by its placid melody."

== Personnel ==
- Paul Simon – lead vocals, guitar
- Ray Phiri – guitar
- Bakithi Kumalo – bass
- Isaac Mtshali – drums
- Youssou N'Dour, Babacar Faye, Assane Thaim, James Guyatt – percussion
- Lenny Pickett – tenor saxophone
- Earl Gardner – trumpet
- Alex Foster – alto saxophone
- Ladysmith Black Mambazo – vocals

== Covers ==
The song has been covered by the Soweto String Quartet and features on their greatest hits collection.

Olivia Dean released a cover of the song on her Apple Music Nashville Sessions in November 2025.

== Charts ==
Chart (1987)	Peak position
Australia (Kent Music Report)	69
Canada Adult Contemporary (RPM)	2
Belgium (Ultratop 50 Flanders)	28
Netherlands (Single Top 100)	85
UK Singles (OCC)	77
UK Airplay (Music & Media)	4

== Certifications ==
Region	Certification	Certified units/sales
New Zealand (RMNZ)	Platinum	30,000^{‡}
United Kingdom (BPI)	Silver	200,000^{‡}
^{‡} Sales+streaming figures based on certification alone.

== Notes ==
=== Sources ===
- Bennighof, James (2007). The Words and Music of Paul Simon. Greenwood Publishing Group. ISBN 978-0-275-99163-0.
- Eliot, Marc (2010). Paul Simon: A Life. John Wiley and Sons. ISBN 978-0-470-43363-8.
