= You Can Call Me Al =

1986 single by Paul Simon

Single by Paul Simon

from the album Graceland
- B-side: "Gumboots"
- Released: July 1986
- Recorded: April 1986
- Studio: The Hit Factory (New York City)
- Genre: Pop rock; folk-pop; new wave; synth-pop; worldbeat; afropop
- Length: 4:40
- Label: Warner Bros.
- Songwriter: Paul Simon
- Producer: Paul Simon

Paul Simon singles chronology
"Think Too Much" (1984)	"You Can Call Me Al" (1986)	"Graceland" (1986)

Music video
- "You Can Call Me Al" on YouTube

"You Can Call Me Al" is a song by the American singer-songwriter Paul Simon. It was the lead single from his seventh studio album, Graceland (1986), released on Warner Bros. Records. Written by Simon, its lyrics follow an individual seemingly experiencing a midlife crisis. Its lyrics were partially inspired by Simon's trip to South Africa and experience with its culture. Released in July 1986, "You Can Call Me Al" became one of Simon's biggest solo hits, reaching the top five in seven countries.

== Background and composition ==
The names in the song came from an incident at a party that Simon went to with his then-wife Peggy Harper. French composer and conductor Pierre Boulez, who was attending the same party, mistakenly referred to Paul as "Al" and to Peggy as "Betty", inspiring Simon to write a song.

Jon Pareles noted that the lyrics can be interpreted as describing a man experiencing a midlife crisis ("Where's my wife and family? What if I die here? Who'll be my role model?"). However, as Simon himself explained during the Graceland episode of the Classic Albums documentary series, by the third verse the lyrics move from a generic portrait-like perspective to a personal and autobiographical one, as he describes his journey to South Africa which inspired the entire album.

The song opens simply, with its protagonist wondering aloud why his life is difficult, amid other questions. Simon structured the song's lyrics in a way that listeners would be given the simplest information first, before getting abstract with his imagery in the song's third verse: "Because there's been a structure, [...] those abstract images, they will come down and fall into one of the slots that the mind has already made up about the structure of the song."

== Recording and production ==
"You Can Call Me Al" was recorded entirely at The Hit Factory in New York City in April 1986; it differs from much of Graceland in that regard, as most of the songs on the album were recorded in numerous locales worldwide.

Some of the saxophone textures heard on "You Can Call Me Al" were created by Adrian Belew on a guitar synthesizer: "I had written a variety of saxophone emulations from baritone to alto which had a realistic yet unorthodox quality. [Simon] spelled out each part exactly as he wanted them for the iconic beginning of the song. They may have added real saxophones later but my synthesized saxophones are definitely there as well. I’m sure very few people realize that."

Synthesizer player Rob Mounsey arranged and conducted the horn section of eight brass instruments and a bass saxophone, and contributed heavily to the track's arrangement and groove. The song features a bass run performed by Bakithi Kumalo who recorded one measure of descending notes. To extend that for the song's break, the tape was reversed to create an ascending measure. The decision to reverse the recording was made by Simon's long-time engineer Roy Halee, who noted in a later interview that this type of experimentation was common in order to make the songs more interesting. The penny whistle solo was performed by jazz musician Morris Goldberg.

After the song's completion, it was mixed at The Hit Factory alongside the rest of Graceland, at an average of two days per song. The fast pace of Simon's vocals made them difficult to mix over the numerous instruments in the backing track. After much work on the track, Halee used tape delays feeding separately into the two audio channels, which made the vocals clear.

== Reception ==
Billboard praised Simon's lyrics and vocal performance, and said that "the melody moves along to beguiling Afro-Caribbean polyrhythms."

== Chart performance ==
In the United States, "You Can Call Me Al" initially fared poorly, reaching number 44 on the Billboard Hot 100 in September 1986. However, as sales and acclaim for Graceland grew, culminating in a win for Album of the Year at the 29th Annual Grammy Awards in February 1987, the single experienced a resurgence in sales and airplay. After making a second entry on the Billboard Hot 100 in March, the song rose to a peak of number 23 in May 1987. The song reached the top 10 of several European charts. In the UK, it became Simon's biggest solo hit, spending five weeks in the top 10 and peaking at number four in October 1986. It has since been certified quadruple platinum in the UK.

== Music videos ==
Simon did not like the original music video for the song, which was a performance of the song Simon gave during the monologue when he hosted Saturday Night Live in the perspective of a video monitor. A replacement video directed by Gary Weis was conceived partly by Saturday Night Live creator Lorne Michaels, in which Simon's friend and Saturday Night Live alumnus Chevy Chase lip-synced Simon's vocals as Simon lip-synced to the backing vocals and brought in various instruments to mime playing when they respectively appear in the song. The height difference between the 6 ft 4 in (193 cm) Chase and the 5 ft 3 in (160 cm) Simon serves as a comical juxtaposition.

== Personnel ==
- Paul Simon – lead vocals, backing vocals, 6-string electric bass
- Rob Mounsey – synthesizer, horn arrangements (uncredited on album)
- Adrian Belew – guitar synthesizer
- Ray Phiri – guitar
- Bakithi Kumalo – fretless bass
- Isaac Mtshali – drums
- Ralph MacDonald – percussion
- James Guyatt – percussion
- Ronnie Cuber – baritone saxophone, bass saxophone
- Dave Bargeron – trombone
- Kim Allan Cissel – trombone
- Randy Brecker – trumpet
- Jon Faddis – trumpet
- Alan Rubin – trumpet
- Lew Soloff – trumpet
- Morris Goldberg – penny whistle
- Ladysmith Black Mambazo – backing vocals (uncredited)

== Charts ==
=== Weekly charts ===
Chart (1986–1987)	Peak position
Australia (Kent Music Report)	2
Belgium (Ultratop 50 Flanders)	2
Canada Top Singles (RPM)	11
Canada Adult Contemporary (RPM)	3
Europe (Eurochart Hot 100)	20
Finland (Suomen virallinen lista)	9
Ireland (IRMA)	2
Israel (IBA)	3
Netherlands (Dutch Top 40)	2
Netherlands (Single Top 100)	5
New Zealand (Recorded Music NZ)	6
South Africa (Springbok Radio)	2
UK Singles (Official Charts)	4
UK Airplay (Music & Media)	1
US Billboard Hot 100	23
US Adult Contemporary (Billboard)	15
US Mainstream Rock Airplay (Billboard)	42

=== Year-end charts ===
Chart (1986)	Position
Australia (Kent Music Report)	21
Belgium (Ultratop 50 Flanders)	14
Netherlands (Dutch Top 40)	18
Netherlands (Single Top 100)	25
UK Singles (OCC)	40

Chart (1987)	Position
Australia (Kent Music Report)	100

== Certifications ==
Certifications for "You Can Call Me Al"
Region	Certification	Certified units/sales
Denmark (IFPI Danmark)	Platinum	90,000^{‡}
New Zealand (RMNZ)	4× Platinum	120,000^{‡}
United Kingdom (BPI)	4× Platinum	2,400,000^{‡}
^{‡} Sales+streaming figures based on certification alone.

== In popular culture ==
- The song is performed in a 2015 episode of Portlandia, Season 5, Episode 9, "You Can Call Me Al". The performance features an appearance by Simon himself.
- The music video is parodied in Mikal Cronin's 2015 music video, "Say".
- The song appears in the 2025 Netflix film A Merry Little Ex-Mas. The characters Everett and Beth jokingly call each other "Al" and "Betty", referencing the song's title, and the track plays as the film closes out.
- The music video heavily inspired The Strokes's 2026 music video, "Going Shopping".

== Bibliography ==
- Bennighof, James (2007). The Words and Music of Paul Simon. Greenwood Publishing Group. ISBN 978-0-275-99163-0.
- Kingston, Victoria (2000). Simon & Garfunkel: The Biography. Fromm International. ISBN 978-0-88064-246-0.
