= Ray Phiri =

South African guitarist (1947–2017)

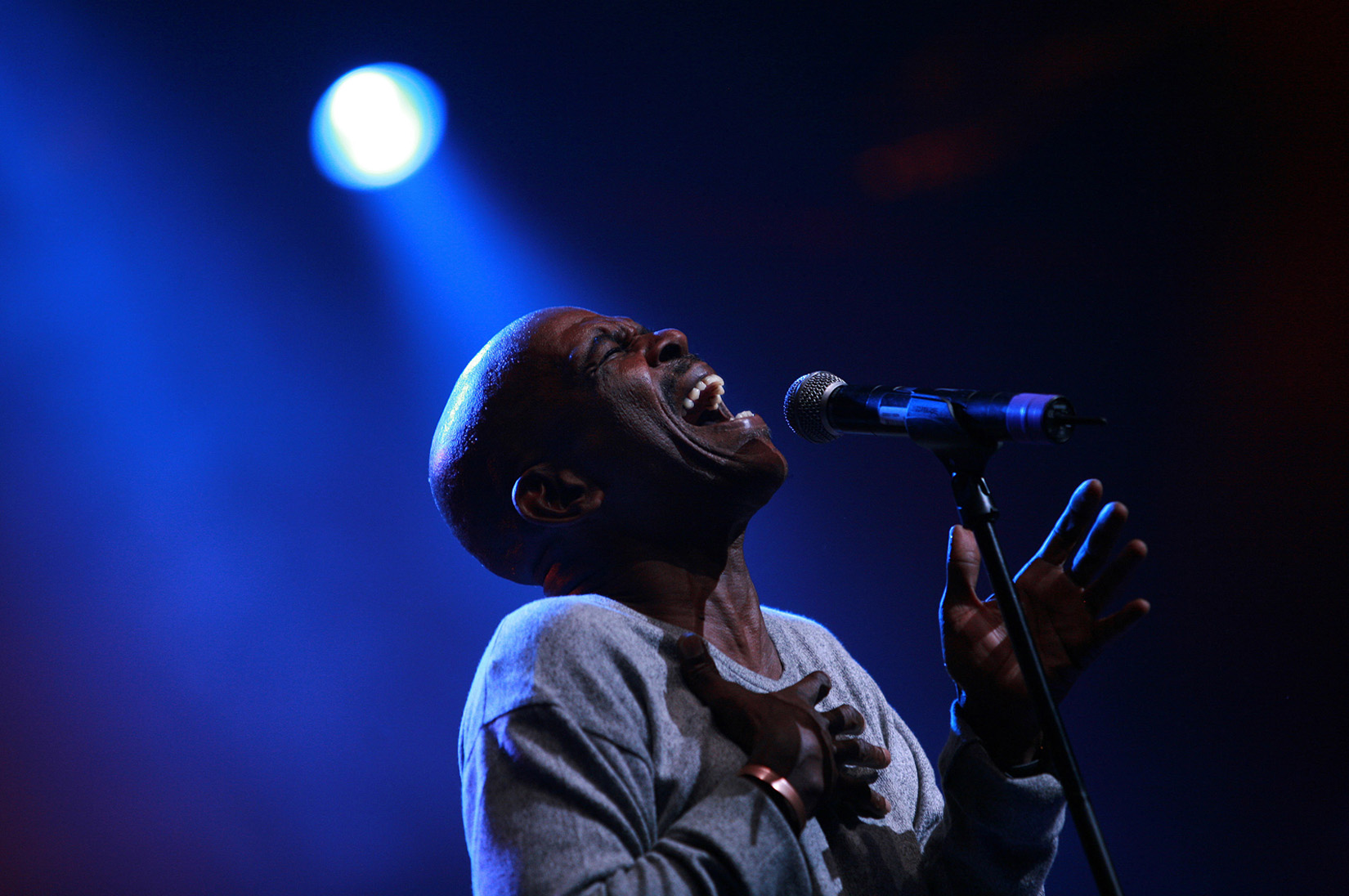
- Phiri performing in 2007
- Born: Raymond Chikapa Phiri; 23 March 1947; Nelspruit, South Africa
- Died: 12 July 2017 (aged 70); Nelspruit, South Africa
- Occupations: Recording artist, jazz fusion
- Years active: 1970–2017
- Spouse: Daphney Phiri (deceased)
- Children: 3 sons, 5 daughters
- Musical career
- Genres: Jazz, jazz fusion, reggae, mbaqanga
- Instruments: Vocals, guitar (Fender Stratocaster)
- Labels: Gallo, Barclay

Raymond Chikapa Enock Phiri (23 March 1947 – 12 July 2017) was a South African jazz, fusion and mbaqanga musician born in Mpumalanga to Thabethe Phiri, a Malawian immigrant worker, and South African guitarist nicknamed "Just Now" Phiri. He was a founding member of the Cannibals in the 1970s. When the Cannibals disbanded Ray founded Stimela, with whom he conceived gold and platinum-selling albums like Fire, Passion and Ecstacy (1984), Look, Listen and Decide (1986). He collaborated with Paul Simon and Ladysmith Black Mambazo on Simon's Graceland (1986) album.

== Career ==
Ray Phiri was born near Nelspruit in the then Eastern Transvaal, now Mpumalanga Province, in South Africa. In 1985, Paul Simon asked Ray along with Ladysmith Black Mambazo and other South African musicians to join his Graceland (1986) project, which was successful and also helped the South African musicians to make names for themselves abroad.

Phiri went on to collaborate with Simon again on Simon's Rhythm of the Saints (1990), which saw him perform in over 30 nations during 1990 and 1991, including in Paul Simon's Concert in the Park (1991) and at New York's Madison Square Garden, as well as appearing on Saturday Night Live and other top television shows in the United States. The tour concluded in early 1992 with concerts staged in South Africa at venues in Johannesburg, Cape Town, Port Elizabeth and Durban.

In a 2011 interview with The Sunday Times Phiri said that there was "bad blood" between him and Simon. Phiri maintained that Simon never gave him credit for the songs he had written for Graceland, and that Ladysmith Black Mambazo "hardly got any royalties". But he added: "maybe I wouldn't have been able to handle all that wealth. I sleep at night, I have my sanity and I enjoy living. The big rock 'n' roll machine did not munch me."

In 2012, Simon organised a European Graceland 25th Anniversary Tour in which Phiri also contributed his voice, guitar and leadership.

== Personal life and death ==
Phiri was involved in a series of car accidents which affected his personal life and musical career. In 1987 he was badly injured in a crash that claimed the lives of his band manager and six others. In 2003, his wife was killed in a car accident, but Ray escaped serious injury. Phiri was diagnosed with lung cancer and died at the age of 70 on 12 July 2017 at a Nelspruit hospital. A memorial service for Phiri was held at the Mbombela Stadium in Nelspruit on 20 July, and the funeral service took place at the same venue two days later.

== Achievements ==
Phiri has received many awards in recognition for his contribution in the music industry, one of these is the Order of Ikhamanga in Silver awarded to him by the South African president. This was to honor his sterling contribution to the South African music industry and the successful use of arts as an instrument of social transformation.

In 2024 the University of South Africa posthumously conferred Phiri with a doctor of philosophy in music.

== Discography ==
=== With Mpharanyana and the Cannibals ===
- 1976: Zion Soul
- 1977: Disco Bump
- 1978: Nka Nako Ho Motseba
- 1979: Ulunywa Izinja

=== With The Cannibals ===
- 1979: Get Funky
- 1980: Total Rejection
- 1981: I'm Tired of the Past
- 1981: Put Your Dancing Shoes On

=== With Stimela ===
- 1982: Mama Wami
- 1982: Stimela
- 1984: Fire, Passion and Ecstasy
- 1985: Shadows, Fear and Pain
- 1986: Look, Listen and Decide
- 1986: Rewind (released due to popular demand after Look, Listen and Decide)
- 1987: Unfinished Story
- 1988: Live!
- 1989: Trouble in the Land of Plenty
- 1990: The Second Half (Live)
- 1991: Siyaya
- 1994: Don't Ask Why
- 2003: Steam Tracks ("Best of" compilation)
- 2010: A Lifetime...
- 2010: Live in Concert 25 Years

=== Solo ===
- 1992: People Don't Talk, So Let's Talk
- 1999: How
- 2000: Chikapa's 11 Years

== See also ==
- Dan Tshanda
