= Bakithi Kumalo =

- Born: 10 May 1956 (age 70); Alexandra, Gauteng, South Africa
- Occupation: Musician
- Instrument: Bass guitar

Baghiti Khumalo (/bɑːˈɡiːˈtiː kuːˈmɑːloʊ/; born 10 May 1956) is a South African bassist, composer, and vocalist. Kumalo is best known for his fretless bass playing on Paul Simon's 1986 album Graceland, in particular the bass run on "You Can Call Me Al".

== Biography and career ==
Bakithi Kumalo was born in the Johannesburg township of Soweto, surrounded by relatives who loved music and actively performed. He got his first job at the age of seven filling in for his uncle's bass player. Kumalo worked as a session musician in South Africa during the 1970s and early 1980s, eventually becoming a top session bassist and accompanying international performers during their South African tours.

In 1985, Kumalo was introduced to Paul Simon by producer Hendrick Lebone during the sessions for Simon's Graceland album. Kumalo traveled with Simon to New York City to finish the sessions, and after the accompanying concert tour, "spent several years commuting between Soweto and New York City" before permanently settling in the United States. Kumalo has toured regularly with Simon since then. He has also released several solo records, and continued to perform as a session musician with artists such as Joan Baez, Cyndi Lauper, Herbie Hancock, Tedeschi Trucks Band, Randy Brecker, Grover Washington Jr., and Mickey Hart.

== Playing style ==
Kumalo's playing combines elements of American Motown and jazz styles with traditional South African music. His lines "typically feature inverted broken arpeggios, quick pentatonic lines, and counter melodies," using techniques such as slap bass, dead notes, "octave 'hiccups,' anticipated downbeats, triplets, and double stops." He cites Jaco Pastorius, Alphonso Johnson, and James Jamerson as important early influences.

He purchased his first fretless bass, a Washburn B-40 model, because "it was the cheapest bass in the store . . . nobody wanted to play it." Paul Simon has described Kumalo's sound on this instrument as "enormous . . . almost like a horn, but so primal." As of 2014, he also plays a signature model Kala U-Bass.

== Discography ==
- Graceland (1986)
- Paradise in Gazankulu (1988)
- Step on the Bass Line (1988)
- A Night To Remember (1989)
- Sanibonani (1998)
- Supralingua – Mickey Hart and Planet Drum (1998)
- In Front of My Eyes (2000)
- You're the One (2000)
- This Is Me (2005)
- Transmigration (2006)
- Change (2009)
- Something Good (2010)
- Stranger to Stranger (2016)
- Kama Sutra Rodeo (2016)
- What You Hear is What You See (2021)
