= Afterlife (disambiguation) =

The afterlife refers to a belief in life after death.

Afterlife or after life may also refer to:

== Literature ==
- Afterlife, a 1985 book on psychic research by Colin Wilson
- Afterlife (comics), a 2006 manga by Stormcrow Hayes and Rob Steen
- Afterlife (play), a 2008 play by Michael Frayn on the life of Max Reinhardt, founder of the Salzburg Festival
- "Afterlife" (short story), a 2013 short story by Stephen King
- After Life (play), a 2021 play by Jack Thorne based on the 1998 Japanese film (see below)

=== Novels ===
- Afterlife, a 1990 novel by Paul Monette
- The Afterlife, a 2005 novel by Gary Soto
- Afterlife, a 2009 novel by Sean O'Brien
- Afterlife (Gray novel), a 2011 novel in the Evernight series by Claudia Gray
- Afterlife, a 2014 novel by Dee Shulman
- Afterlife, a 2020 novel by Julia Alvarez

== Film and TV ==
=== Film ===
- Afterlife (1978 film), an animated short by Ishu Patel
- After Life (film), a 1998 Japanese drama film
- AfterLife (film), a 2003 UK drama film
- After.Life, a 2009 American psychological horror film
- Resident Evil: Afterlife, a 2010 horror film
- Afterlife (2014 film), a Hungarian film directed by Virág Zomborácz
- Ghostbusters: Afterlife, a 2021 American supernatural comedy film

=== Television ===
- Afterlife (TV series), a 2005 British television drama series
- The Afterlife with Suzane Northrop, or The Afterlife, a 2008 Canadian documentary television series
- After Life (TV series), a 2019–2022 British streaming television series

==== Episodes ====
- "After Life" (Buffy the Vampire Slayer)
- "After Life" (St. Elsewhere)
- "Afterlife" (The Outer Limits)
- "Afterlife" (Agents of S.H.I.E.L.D.)
- "The Afterlife" (Traders)
- "After Life", an episode of Night Visions
- "The Afterlife", an episode of Sci Fi Investigates

== Video games ==
- Afterlife (video game), a 1996 simulation game by LucasArts
- Wraith: The Oblivion – Afterlife, a 2021 horror game by Fast Travel Games

== Music ==
=== Albums ===
- Afterlife (Joe Jackson album), 2004
- Afterlife (Nocturnal Rites album), or the title song, 2000
- Afterlife, by Disco Ensemble, 2017
- Afterlife, by DJ Rashad, 2016
- Afterlife, by Light Years, 2018
- Afterlife, by R. Stevie Moore, 2019
- AfterLife (album), by Five Finger Death Punch, or the title song (below), 2022
- The Afterlife, by the Comet Is Coming, 2019
- Afterlyfe, by Yeat, 2023

=== EPs ===
- Afterlife (EP), by Global Goon, or the title song, 1997
- After Life, by Tchami, or the title song, 2015

=== Songs ===
- "Afterlife" (Arcade Fire song), 2013
- "Afterlife" (Avenged Sevenfold song), 2007
- "Afterlife" (Bush song), 2010
- "Afterlife" (Evanescence song), 2025
- "Afterlife" (Hailee Steinfeld song), 2019
- "The Afterlife", by Paul Simon, 2011
- "AfterLife" (song), by Five Finger Death Punch, 2022
- "Afterlife", by Ad Infinitum from Chapter II: Legacy, 2013
- "Afterlife", by Amaranthe from The Nexus, 2013
- "Afterlife", by The Amity Affliction from House of Cards, 2026
- "Afterlife", by Betraying the Martyrs from Phantom, 2014
- "Afterlife", by Bleed from Within from Era, 2018
- "Afterlife", by Chris Brown from 11:11 (Deluxe), 2024
- "Afterlife", by Dream Theater from When Dream and Day Unite, 1989
- "Afterlife", by Front Line Assembly from Improvised Electronic Device, 2010
- "Afterlife", by Future and Juice Wrld from Wrld on Drugs, 2018
- "Afterlife", by Gothminister from Utopia, 2013
- "Afterlife", by Greyson Chance from Somewhere Over My Head, 2016
- "Afterlife", by Ingrid Michaelson from Lights Out, 2014
- "Afterlife", by Iron Fire from Metalmorphosized, 2020
- "Afterlife", by Lost Society from Hell Is a State of Mind, 2026
- "Afterlife", by Metalite from Heroes in Time, 2017
- "Afterlife", by Mutoid Man from War Moans, 2017
- "Afterlife", by Nemesea from The Quiet Resistance, 2011
- "Afterlife", by Nothing but Thieves from Broken Machine, 2017
- "Afterlife", by Primal Fear from Metal Commando, 2020
- "Afterlife", by Switchfoot from Vice Verses, 2011
- "Afterlife", by Testament from The Formation of Damnation, 2008
- "Afterlife", by Unleash the Archers from Abyss, 2020
- "After Life", by Band-Maid from Unseen World, 2021
- "The Afterlife", by Borealis from World of Silence, 2008

== See also ==
- Afterlives
- After death (disambiguation)
- Life after death (disambiguation)
- Life After Life (disambiguation)
- Resurrection of the dead
- World to come
