= Hereafter (disambiguation) =

The term hereafter or afterlife as described in one or more religions involves the continuation of something after physical death of the body.

Hereafter may also refer to:

- Hereafter (film), a 2010 film by Clint Eastwood
- Here After (2021 film), a film by Harry Greenberger
- Here After (2024 film), a supernatural horror drama film
- "Hereafter" (NCIS), a 2013 episode of NCIS
- "Hereafter", a 2003 episode of Justice League
- Hereafter (album), a 2007 album by Romanian heavy metal band Magica

== See also ==
- Here in After, a 1996 album by Immolation
- Hereafter, and After, a fantasy novella by Richard Parks
- Afterlife (disambiguation)
- After death (disambiguation)
- The Sweet Hereafter (disambiguation)
