= Life After Life =

Life After Life may refer to:

== Film ==
- Life After Life (再生人), a 1981 film Hong Kong film; see 2nd Hong Kong Film Awards
- Chances Are (film), a 1989 film that was known while under production as Life After Life
- Life After Life, a 1992 film by Peter Shockey
- Life After Life, a 1995 Screen Two TV film
- Iyore (a.k.a. The Return: Life After Life), a 2014 Nigerian drama film
- Life After Life, a 2015 film student film; see Hong Kong International Film Festival

== Literature ==
- Life After Life (Moody book), a 1975 book about near-death experiences by Raymond Moody
- Life After Life, a 2006 book about prison release by Norman Parker
- Life After Life (novel), a 2013 novel by Kate Atkinson

== Music ==
- Life After Life (band), a 1990s punk band
- Life after Life (生生世世), a 1995 album by Sun Nan
- Life After Life (Жизнь после жизни), a 1996 album by AVIA
- "Life After Life", a 1978 song by Mark Perry
- "Life After Life", a 1994 song by Ronnie Montrose off the album Music from Here
- "Life After Life", a 2001 song from Dracula, the Musical
- "Life After Life", a 2014 song by The Pains of Being Pure at Heart off the album Days of Abandon

== Television ==
- Life After Life (TV series), a 2022 series based on the Kate Atkinson novel of the same name
- Life after life (Zendegi Pas Az Zendegi), an Iranian television program
- "Life After Life", a 1980 episode of the TV series In Search of...
- "Life After Life", a 2014 episode of Holby City

== Other uses ==
- Life After Life, a 2011 radio drama by Toby Swift

== See also ==
- Life after death (disambiguation)
- after death (disambiguation)
- afterlife (disambiguation)
- Life Before Life a 2005 book by Jim B. Tucker
