= Tchami discography =

- Studio albums: 1
- EPs: 3
- Singles: 21
- Music videos: 2

This is the discography of French DJ Tchami.

== Albums ==
List of studio albums
Title	Details
Year Zero	Released: 23 October 2020; Label: Confession; Formats: Digital download

== Extended plays ==
Title	Details
After Life	Released : 22 December 2015; Label : Confession; Format : Digital download
Revelations	Released : 25 August 2017; Label : Confession; Format : Digital download
No Redemption	Released : 4 April 2018; Label : Confession; Format : Digital download
Aurra / Shades	Released : 4 October 2018; Label : Confession; Format : Digital download

== Singles ==
Title	Year	Artists	Albums	Labels
As lead artist
"Promesses"	2013	Tchami feat. Kaleem Taylor	Promesses	Fool's Gold Records
"Shot Caller"	2013	Tchami	Promesses	Fool's Gold Records
"Untrue"	2014	Tchami	Non-album single	Spinnin' Records
"After Life"	2015	Tchami feat. Stacy Barthe	After Life EP	Confession
"Missing You"	2015	Tchami feat. AC Slater & Kaleem Taylor	After Life EP	Confession
"Freakin"	2015	Tchami & Dombresky	After Life EP	Confession
"Alone"	2015	Tchami & Illangelo feat. Chuck Ellis	After Life EP	Confession
"Superlativ"	2015	Tchami	After Life EP	Confession
"Prophecy"	2016	Tchami & Malaa	Non-album single	Confession
"Adieu"	2017	Tchami	Revelations EP	Confession
"World To Me"	2017	Tchami feat. Luke James	Revelations EP	Confession
"Godspell"	2017	Tchami feat. Taiki Nulight	Revelations EP	Confession
"Don't Let Me Down"	2017	Tchami feat. Kaelyn Behr	Revelations EP	Confession
"Zeal"	2017	Tchami	Revelations EP	Confession
"Adieu, Pt. II"	2017	Tchami	Revelations EP	Confession
"Love Language"	2017	Tchami & Angelz	Alchemy II	Confession
"Summer 99'"	2017	Tchami & Malaa	No Redemption EP	Confession
"The Sermon"	2017	Tchami & Malaa	No Redemption EP	Confession
"Kurupt"	2018	Tchami & Malaa	No Redemption EP	Confession
"My Place"	2018	Tchami & Brohug feat. Reece	Non-album singles	Confession
"Omega"	2019	Tchami feat. Ibranovski	Non-album singles	Confession
"Rainforest"	2019	Tchami	Non-album singles	Confession
"Proud"	2020	Tchami feat. Daecolm	Year Zero	Confession
"Ghosts"	2020	Tchami feat. Hana	Year Zero	Confession
"Born Again"	2020	Tchami	Year Zero	Confession
"Buenos Aires"	2020	Tchami	Year Zero	Confession
"Faith"	2020	Tchami feat. Marlena Shaw	Year Zero	Confession
"Praise"	2020	Tchami feat. Gunna	Year Zero	Confession
"Make Amends"	2021	Curbi & Tchami feat. Kyan Palmer	Non-album singles	Spinnin' Records
"Eternity"	2021	Tchami & Habstrakt feat. Lena Leon	Non-album singles	Confession
"Tonight"	2022	Snakehips & Tchami	Non-album singles	Never Worry Records
"The Calling"	2022	Tchami & MARTEN HØRGER	Non-album singles	Confession
"LOW"	2022	Oliver Heldens, Tchami, & Anabel Englund	Non-album singles	Heldeep Records
As featured artist
"Dealer"	2017	AC Slater feat. Tchami & Rome Fortune	Non-album single	OWSLA
"Feel Again"	2025	San Holo feat. Tchami		

== Guest appearances ==
List of non-single guest appearances, with other performing artists, showing year released and album name
Title	Year	Other artist(s)	Album
"Made in France"	2019	DJ Snake, Malaa, & Mercer	Carte Blanche
"Discipline"	2022	Malaa	Don Malaa

== Remixes ==
Title	Year	Artists
"Go Deep"	2013	Janet Jackson
"MYB"	2013	Oliver
"Turn It Up"	2014	Mercer
"Wizard"	2014	Martin Garrix & Jay Hardway
"Not Coming Down"	2014	Candyland & Zak Waters
"Move Your Body"	2014	Marshall Jefferson
"Pushing On"	2014	Oliver $ & Jimi Jules
"Stressed Out"	2014	A Tribe Called Quest
"It Takes Two"	2014	Rob Base and DJ E-Z Rock
"Take Ü There"	2014	Jack Ü feat. Kiesza
"You Know You Like It" (DJ Snake Remix)	2014	AlunaGeorge
"Timeless"	2015	Caroline Koch
"17"	2017	MK
"JustYourSoul"	2020	Valentino Khan & Diplo
"Stay"	2020	Justin Martin feat. Dalilah
"Freefall"	2021	Whethan feat. Oliver Tree
"Sweet Savage"(with Movenchy)	2021	Tchami feat. Ant Clemons
"Heartbreak Anthem"	2021	Galantis, David Guetta & Little Mix
"Say Nothing"	2022	Flume feat. May-a

== Productions credits ==
Title	Year	Artist	Albums	Credit(s)
"Sexxx Dreams"	2013	Lady Gaga	Artpop	Composition
"Do What U Want"	2013	Lady Gaga feat. R. Kelly	Artpop	Composition
"Applause"	2013	Lady Gaga	Artpop	Composition
"Turn Down for What"	2013	DJ Snake & Lil Jon	Non-album singles	Co-producer
"Get Low"	2014	Dillon Francis & DJ Snake	Money Sucks, Friends Rule	Co-producer
"You Know You Like It"	2014	DJ Snake & AlunaGeorge	Non-album singles	Co-producer
"Rien à Envier"	2014	David Carreira	Non-album singles	Co-producer
"Deviens Génial"	2018	Vald	XEU	Co-producer
"Shameless"	2019	Camila Cabello	Romance	Co-producer
"Stupid Love"	2020	Lady Gaga	Chromatica	Producer
"Rain on Me"	2020	Lady Gaga & Ariana Grande	Chromatica	Additional Producer
"1000 Doves"	2020	Lady Gaga	Chromatica	Producer
"Babylon"	2020	Lady Gaga	Chromatica	Additional Producer

== Music videos ==
- 2015 : Tchami feat. Stacy Barthe - "After Life"
- 2017 : Tchami feat. Luke James - "World To Me"
- 2020 : Tchami feat. Gunna - "Praise"
