= Norman Parker =

Norman Parker may refer to:

- Norman Parker (speedway rider) (1908–1999), British international speedway rider
- Norman Parker (author) (born 1944), convicted killer, author and journalist
- Murray Parker (cricketer) (Norman Murray Parker, born 1948), former New Zealand cricketer
