= Mutatis mutandis (disambiguation) =

Mutatis mutandis is a Medieval Latin phrase meaning "the necessary changes having been made" or "once the necessary changes have been made".

Mutatis mutandis may also refer to:

- Mutatis Mutandis (album), a 1991 album by Ronnie Montrose
- Mutatis Mutandis, a 2005 album by Juliette
