= Discovery (Metalite album) =

Studio album by Metalite
- Released: 25 September 2026
- Genre: Power metal
- Length: 46:31
- Label: Reigning Phoenix Music
- Producer: Edwin Premberg

Metalite chronology
Expedition One (2024)	Discovery (2026)

Singles from Discovery
- 1. "Our Time Has Come" Released: 26 February 2026; 2. "Starchild" Released: 24 April 2026; 3. "In Case of Emergency" Released: 29 May 2026; 4. "Echoes of You" Released: 24 July 2026; 5. "The Metal Elite" Released: 11 September 2026; 6. "Neon Rain" Released: 30 September 2026

Professional ratings
Review scores
Source	Rating
Dead Rhetoric	8.5/10
Powermetal.de	9/10

Discovery is the fifth studio album by Swedish power metal band Metalite, released on 25 September 2026. The album was preceded by several singles including "Our Time Has Come", "Starchild", "In Case of Emergency", and "Echoes of You".

== Track listing ==
No.	Title	Length
1.	"Our Time Has Come"	4:02
2.	"In Case of Emergency"	4:33
3.	"Into the Maze"	3:56
4.	"Cyberspace"	3:20
5.	"The Metal Elite"	3:58
6.	"Neon Rain"	4:12
7.	"Echoes of You"	3:01
8.	"Starchild"	3:07
9.	"Wings of Fire"	3:21
10.	"Captive in the Past"	4:11
11.	"Supremacy of One"	4:32
12.	"Triforce"	4:18

== Personnel ==
- Erica Ohlsson – vocals
- Robert Örnesved – guitars
- Edwin Premberg – guitars, keyboards, additional vocals, production
- Robert Majd – bass
- Erik Juntilla – drums
