= Biomechanicals =

Studio album by Metalite
- Released: 25 October 2019
- Genre: Symphonic power metal
- Length: 48:52
- Label: AFM Records
- Producers: Edwin Premberg, Jacob Hansen

Metalite chronology
| Heroes in Time (2017) | Biomechanicals (2019) | A Virtual World (2021) |

Professional ratings
Review scores
| Source | Rating |
|---|---|
| Metal.de | 3/10 |
| Powermetal.de | 8/10 |
| Rock Hard | 5/10 |
| Soundscape Magazine | 8/10 |

Biomechanicals is the second studio album by Swedish power metal band Metalite, released on 25 October 2019. Their first album with AFM Records, it was produced by Jacob Hansen, known for his production work with Volbeat and Amaranthe.

== Track listing ==
All lyrics are written by Edwin Premberg, except "Victory or Death" which is written by Ulf Roos; all music is composed by Edwin Premberg.

| No. | Title | Length |
|---|---|---|
| 1. | "Far from the Sanctuary" | 4:17 |
| 2. | "Apocalypse" | 4:22 |
| 3. | "Biomechanicals" | 4:46 |
| 4. | "Warrior" | 4:30 |
| 5. | "Mind of a Monster" | 4:05 |
| 6. | "World on Fire" | 5:05 |
| 7. | "Eye of the Storm" | 3:59 |
| 8. | "Breakaway" | 4:40 |
| 9. | "Social Butterflies" | 5:07 |
| 10. | "Rise of the Phoenix" | 3:43 |
| 11. | "Victory or Death" | 4:18 |
| Total length: | | 48:52 |

Japanese edition bonus track
| No. | Title | Length |
|---|---|---|
| 12. | "Riders of the Storm" | 4:18 |
| Total length: | | 53:10 |

== Personnel ==
- Erica Ohlsson – vocals
- Robert Örnesved – guitars
- Edwin Premberg – guitars, keyboards, additional vocals, production
- Robert Majd – bass
- Lea Larsson – drums
