= Metalite =

Swedish power metal band

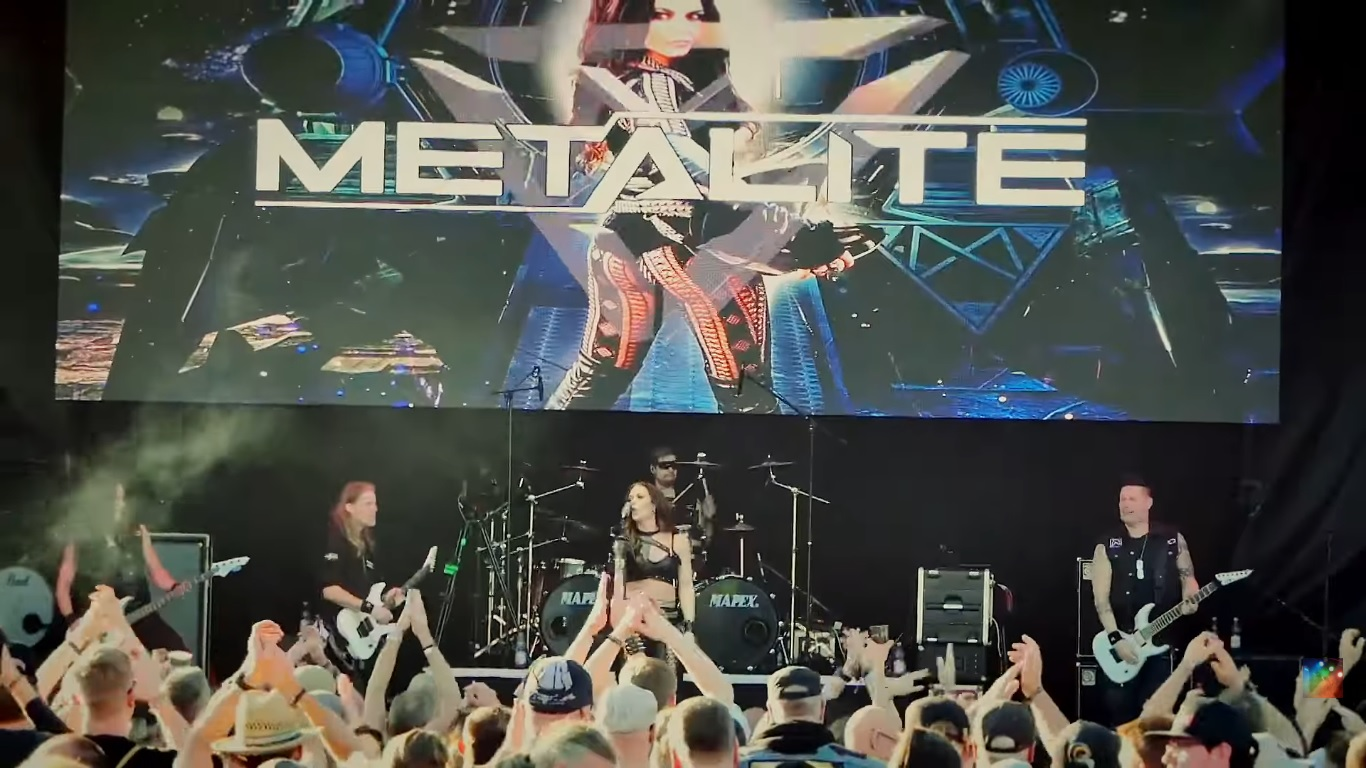
- Metalite at the Rautheim Festival, 2025

Background information
- Origin: Stockholm, Sweden
- Genres: Power metal, symphonic metal
- Years active: 2015–present
- Label: AFM Records
- Members: Edwin Premberg; Robert Örnesved; Robert Majd; Erica Ohlsson; Erik Junttila
- Past members: Emma Bensing; Lea Larsson
- Website: www.metalite.se

Metalite is a Swedish power metal band from Stockholm, led by Edwin Premberg. They released their debut album on Innerwound Recordings and then they released three albums for AFM Records.

== History ==
Metalite is a band from Stockholm. Edwin Premberg (guitars) and Emma Bensing (vocals) met in 2015 and shared their ideas for a music band. The band was completed in 2016 with Lea Larsson (drums), Robert Örnesved (guitar), and Robert Majd (bass). They signed a deal with Inner Wound Recordings and released their first album, Heroes in Time, in October 2017. Emma left the band in 2019, being replaced by Erica Ohlsson. Erica was a worker at the Wallmans Group and had never even heard heavy metal music, Edwin met her during a concert and proposed to her to be their new singer. The band signed a new deal with AFM Records and released their second album, Biomechanicals.

All live shows and tours were canceled in 2020 as a result of the COVID-19 pandemic in Sweden. This included several concerts that the band had arranged, although some of them could be rushed and made before the lockdown. The band switched to digital promotion and social media sites as a replacement, and saw an increase in their streamed music and viewed videos. Besides that, they used the time to write new songs, practice and prepare future concerts. The band would release their next two albums, A Virtual World in 2021 and Expedition One in 2024, the latter preceded by four singles, "Disciples of the Stars", "Blazing Skies", "New Generation", and "Aurora". Expedition One received several mediocre reviews, but also decent reviews such as 7 out of 10 from Powermetal.de.

After the release the band toured across Europe with Leaves' Eyes, Northtale and Catalyst Crime. The tour included their first visit to the UK, one of the intended tours cancelled by the COVID pandemic, and they visited the cities of Birmingham, Glasgow, London, and Manchester. Lea Larsson left the band, amid conflicts with the other members. Joel Kollberg temporarily replaced her during the tour, but the band is not considering him a permanent replacement. He is the drummer of Majestica, he would not be able to play in two bands, and Metalite refuses to deprive the band of their drummer. The band finally chose Erik Junttila as the new drummer in 2025, and started a European tour with Nighthawk. Metalite released a new single, "We Stand Tall", in May 2025.

== Influences ==
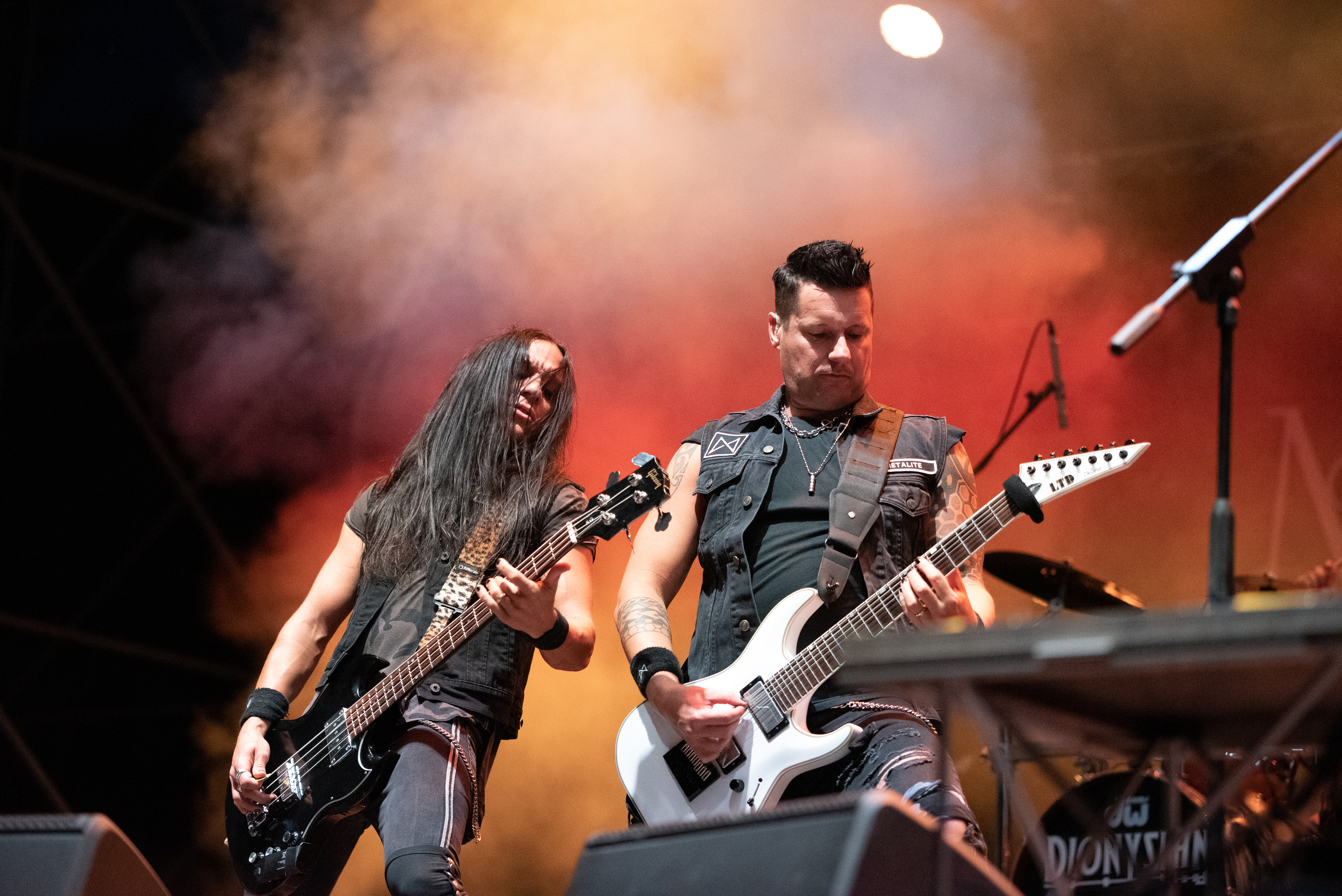
Metalite performing in 2023

Edwin Premberg has stated that he is influenced by European pop music, and that he plays power metal because it is the only subgenre of heavy metal that he finds compatible with pop. The band is also described to have a symphonic metal sound.

Premberg has also stated that he would consider the band's style "modern metal because I mix a lot of different metal styles like power metal, heavy metal, metalcore, thrash metal, hair metal, symphonic metal etc. Mixing these styles together with a lot of modern elements like keyboards, effects etc makes the sound of Metalite. I have heard people say dance metal, Euro-metal, pop metal, electronic metal; but I don’t have a word for it. It’s just...modern metal."

== Band members ==
Current

- Edwin Premberg – guitars, keyboards (2015–present)
- Robert Örnesved – guitars (2016–present)
- Robert Majd – bass (2016–present)
- Erica Ohlsson – vocals (2019–present)
- Erik Junttila – drums (2024–present)

Former

- Emma Bensing – vocals (2015–2018)
- Lea Larsson – drums (2016–2024)

== Discography ==
- Heroes in Time (2017)
- Biomechanicals (2019)
- A Virtual World (2021)
- Expedition One (2024)
- Discovery (2026)
