= Clap! Clap! =

Italian producer and DJ

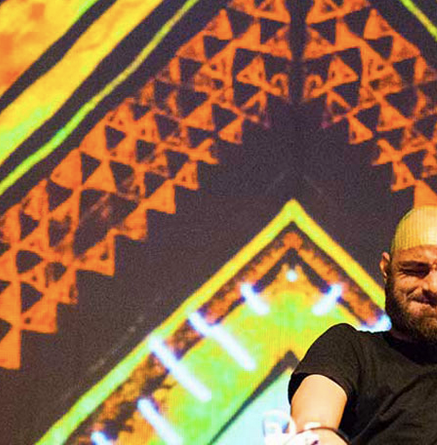
Clap! Clap!

Cristiano Crisci, commonly known by stage name Clap! Clap!, is an Italian producer and DJ. He is a long time jazz musician and previously worked under the alias Digi G'Alessio.

== Career ==
Crisci's first release on Origami Sound in 2013 entitled Gwidingwi Dema marked his arrival onto the electronic music scene as Clap! Clap! Since then he has had numerous critically acclaimed releases on Bristol-based label Black Acre. His inaugural Album Tayi Bebba, supported by Gilles Peterson, was hailed as one of Okay Africa's 'Best Albums of 2014', and was on Bleep.com's 'End of Year Roundup 2014'. The track "Viarejo" was featured on the soundtrack of Grand Theft Auto V for Microsoft Windows and current-gen consoles.

Crisci's musical style is eclectic and draws from many influences. His productions feature his own field recordings mixed with West African percussions and Latin soca influences, but also draw on contemporary electronic music movements, with his use of staccato found in Chicago 'Footwork', and Italian folk rhythms and melodies.

Clap! Clap! provided additional production on three of the tracks in Paul Simon's album Stranger to Stranger. "The Werewolf", "Street Angel" and "Wristband" include 'Beats by Clap! Clap!' and use African sounds with a modern electronic dance twist, providing both fans of Paul Simon and Clap! Clap! with an entirely new listening experience. In an interview with NPR's All Songs Considered, Simon called Clap! Clap!'s album Tayi Bebba a masterpiece.

Following on from Tayi Bebba, Crisci's second album A Thousand Skies was released on Black Acre in February 2017, marks the artist's progression sonically and visually. Compared to previous releases, A Thousand skies is softer, with the new record serving as an eclectic mix of Crisci's career to date by combining samples and live instrumentation with collaborators such as South African folk singer Bongeziwe Mabandla, John Wizards, and ØY. As with his debut, the album is anchored by a story — this time of a young girl's journey through the stars — which completes the work. "I like to write what the music gives me when I listen to it," Crisci explains. Nguwe, featuring Bongeziwe Mabandla, to date has been featured in Okay Africa, with an album announcement in Resident Advisor and fellow Italian animator Jonathan Calugi providing a whimsical visual accompaniment for Hope. 'Ar-Raqis' was featured on the 2019 Pro Evo Soccer Soundtrack.

In 2017, Clap! Clap! contributed to the soundtrack for the award-winning film Liyana based in Eswatini, which went on to win several awards. He then went to collaborate with the Italian composter Vittorio Cosma, on the soundtrack for the feature-length documentary I Am The Revolution, directed by Benedetta Argentieri.

== Discography ==
- Tayi Bebba (2014)
- A Thousand Skies (2016)
- Liquid Portraits (2020)
