= So Beautiful or So What =

Studio album by Paul Simon
- Released: April 8, 2011
- Studio: Simon's cottage (New Canaan); Simon's summer home (Montauk)
- Genre: Folk rock
- Length: 38:15
- Label: Hear Music
- Producer: Phil Ramone, Paul Simon

Paul Simon chronology
Surprise (2006)	So Beautiful or So What (2011)	The Ultimate Collection (2016)

Singles from So Beautiful or So What
- 1. "Getting Ready for Christmas Day" Released: November 22, 2010; 2. "The Afterlife" Released: February 25, 2011

So Beautiful or So What is the twelfth solo studio album by American folk rock singer-songwriter Paul Simon. It was released on April 8, 2011, by Hear Music.

The album found Simon reuniting with former collaborator and record producer Phil Ramone. Having experimented with rhythm-based textures for much of the previous two decades, the singer returned to composing songs in a more traditional manner using only his acoustic guitar. These songs were further augmented by experimental recording practices in the studio. The album was largely recorded in a small cottage at Simon's home in New Canaan, Connecticut.

The music of So Beautiful or So What features West African blues-inspired guitar playing, Indian-style percussion, and experimentation with samples, which ranged from an excerpt from a 1941 sermon to nighttime ambience in Kenya. The songs were recorded with little bass but with a very large presence of bells. Much of Simon's lyrics touch on themes of spirituality and mortality, which Simon said was unintentional and resulted naturally in his songwriting process for the album.

So Beautiful or So What received widespread acclaim from critics, many of whom considered it Simon's best work in two decades. It later appeared on many year-end lists of the year's best records. The album also became his highest US chart debut at the time, reaching No. 4 on the Billboard 200, and charted within the top ten in nine other countries.

== Recording and production ==
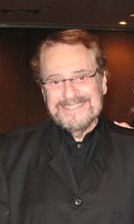
So Beautiful or So What was co-produced by Phil Ramone (pictured in 2009).

For So Beautiful or So What, Simon reunited with record producer and former collaborator Phil Ramone, who previously worked with him on Simon & Garfunkel's 1982 live album The Concert in Central Park. According to Simon, the reunion came casually; he told Ramone when they met each other that he was beginning to work on a new album and, as Ramone lived in the next town, they decided it would be easy to work together again. Simon recorded the album at his small cottage in New Canaan, Connecticut. The recording sessions often consisted solely of Simon, Ramone, and engineer Andy Smith. Throughout the production of the record, the album's engineers would gradually make upgrades to the space during months off. As it was not acoustically designed or soundproofed, Smith often employed iZotope RX software to rid the recordings of extra noise, such as an oak tree above the home from which acorns fell, interrupting recordings. Keeping in line with his experimental attitude, Simon decided to record the acorns, remarking, "All sounds are musical once you start to listen." Occasionally, Simon would record in the control room instead. Like all of Simon's output from his 1997 effort Songs from The Capeman onward, the album was recorded digitally using Pro Tools.

Much time was spent on getting guitars to sound as Simon preferred. A bit of experimentation among the additional session players occurred, from which Simon would edit himself, compiling them together or often deleting them altogether. Many songs were recorded with a hand-built cigar-box guitar, which Simon bought from Mississippi blues musician Super Chikan. Analogue effects were applied before recording digitally to keep mixes simple; this method also inspired Simon while arranging the songs. Smith would burn Simon a compact disc each evening of the day's session, and he would return the next day with notes on the recordings. This resulted in mixes being created as the album developed, rather than at the end of the process. Simon and Ramone often listened to their recordings while driving around, noting what would need changes.

The album's production lasted over a year. Additional recording took place at Simon's summer home in Montauk, New York on Long Island, but less so than his previous efforts. Home recording, as Ramone told Sound on Sound shortly after the album's release, required a certain discipline. Simon would often arrive in the morning and recording until nightfall. Percussion and vocals were overdubbed at Germano Studios. The Indian ensemble on "Dazzling Blue" was recorded at Clinton Studios in New York City, while a bluegrass ensemble was cut at Tony Bennett’s New Jersey studio. Simon’s wife, Edie Brickell, and his teenage daughter Lulu contributed harmonies, while Chris Bear of indie rock band Grizzly Bear contributed electronic drum parts to the album.

Simon financed the recording of So Beautiful or So What himself after being released from his 30-year record contract with Warner Bros. Records. After the recording sessions were finished, he signed a deal with Concord Music Group to distribute the album. Simon said, "It's the best work I've done in 20 years." The cover art, titled "DNA Mutation", was designed by visual artist and NASA systems engineer Sven Geier.

== Music and lyrics ==
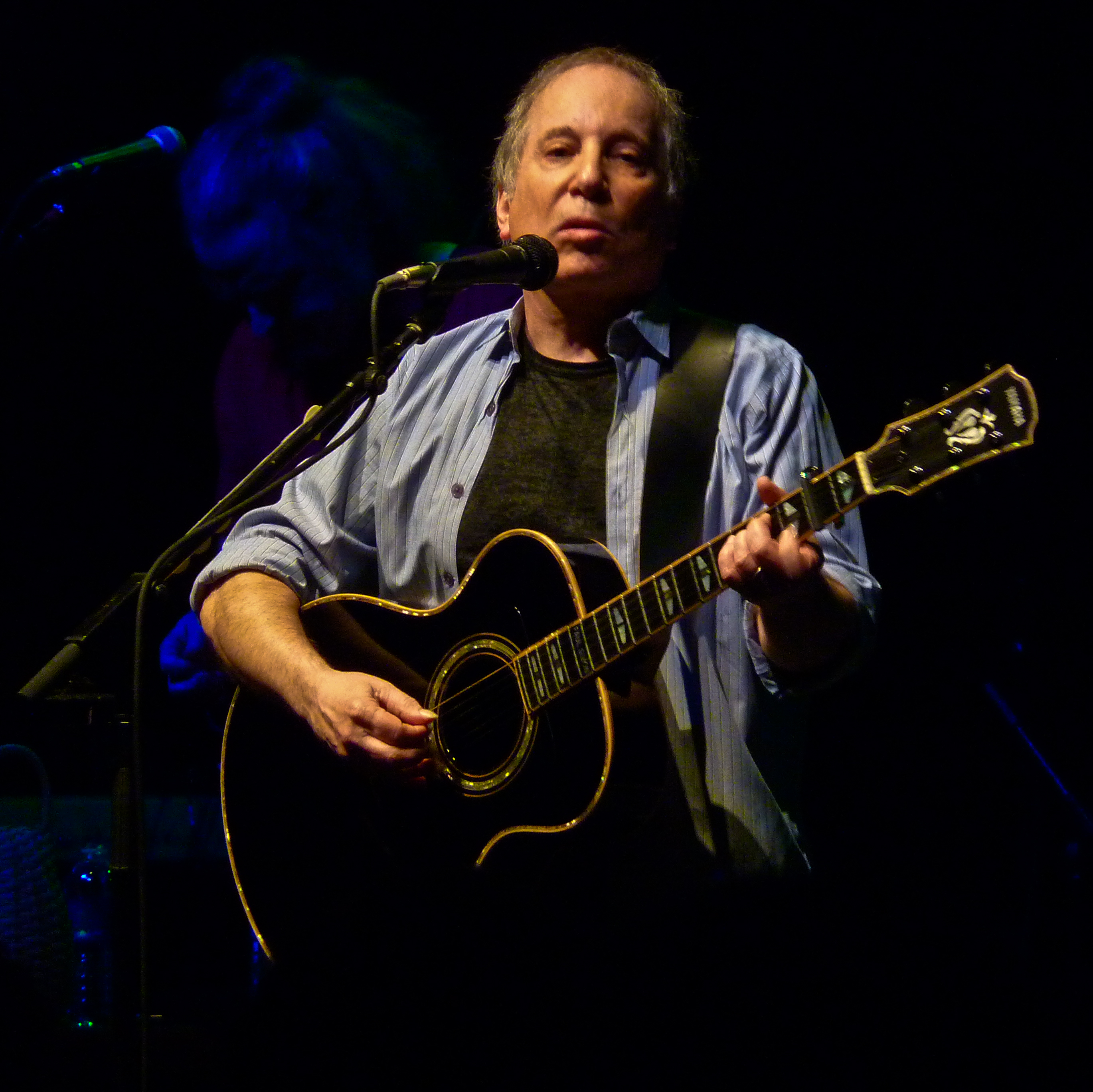
Simon (pictured in 2011) composed the album's songs using only his guitar.

So Beautiful or So What finds Simon returning to more harmonic-based compositions than rhythm-based. This was spurred from when he realized his favorite song on his 2006 effort Surprise, "Everything About It Is a Love Song", contained a chord progression he found particularly interesting. After coming to this realization, he focused on the album's three ballads, "Questions for the Angels", "Amulet", and "Love and Hard Times". Unlike his previous rhythm-based albums, in which he would gain inspiration for his guitar parts from pre-recorded backing tracks, Simon took a more traditional approach to building the songs on So Beautiful or So What. He wrote songs at home before developing them further in the studio with the help of a natural click track, such as "a percussion instrument, or even just tapping out a rhythm on his guitar". He overdubbed additional elements afterwards, including additional guitar parts and percussion. Simon began envisioning the album's sequencing when he only had a few songs written, letting it inform his songwriting.

The music for So Beautiful or So What was inspired by West African blues, which Simon combined with "Indian drumming, Old Hollywood strings and bluegrass harmony singing". The songs employ a wide variety of samples, including from older blues and gospel recordings. "Love Is Eternal Sacred Light" contains a harmonica sample from Sonny Terry, and "Love and Blessings" lifts from The Golden Gate Jubilee Quartet. Simon did not want to record an ordinary studio album and instead, according to Ramone, wanted "lots of space with lots of atmosphere and feeling ... Rather than go for hugely orchestrated ideas he was going, for example, for overtones in bells and gongs. Or if a sax or a kora comes in, they're there to do something specific, and not to fill in the space." The album's music is also largely devoid of heavy bass (some tracks actually using a baritone guitar instead), and drums are very quiet and reserved. Smith said percussion instruments, including exotic bells, ancient hand bells, and glockenspiels, were Simon's favorite to record with for the album. In using bells to augment the sound, Simon put them behind certain guitar notes to “highlight” the sound, as he wanted the recordings to be devoid of echo; he found that using bells created only a slight echo, with an odd, atmospheric tone that he preferred. Drummer Jim Oblon placed towels over each drums to emphasize the higher-frequency percussive instruments.

How was all of this created? If the answer to that question is God created everything, there was a creator, than I say, great! What a great job. And I like the idea. I find it very, I don’t know, I find it comforting in some way. But if the answer to that is there is no God, I don’t feel like, well, what a jerk I’ve been. I feel, oh fine, so there’s another answer. I don’t know the answer. I’m just a speck of dust here for a nanosecond, and I’m very grateful.

—Paul Simon

The songs on So Beautiful or So What touch on subjects such as love, mortality, and faith. In terms of songwriting, Simon did not approach each new song with a theme; instead, he let them evolve naturally from the first line he would compose. Simon had no plans to pursue religious writing, but it ended up particularly strong in the album's lyrics. He noted that "five of the first six" songs he wrote touched on themes of God: "I wondered whether there was a subconscious theme that I was tapping into. I have used Christian symbols and imagery before in songs. It’s very strongly evocative, so it may just be coincidence—but it may not be." The A.V. Club suggested that the album's gospel influence inspired the touch of humor when discussing dark subjects such as death.

"Getting Ready for Christmas Day" was one of the album's earliest completed songs, and it contains a sample from a 1941 sermon by the Reverend J.M. Gates. The sermon inspired the song's creation, with a certain rhythmic tone to his oration that interested him. Simon heard the sermon on a box set titled Goodbye Babylon, which consists early 20th century Americana. It came together quicker than other songs, with Simon recording his guitar live. The track also references his nephew, who served multiple tours in the Iraq War. "The Afterlife" concerns a man dying and getting to heaven, where he waits in line to meet with God, where everyone is "filling out forms and waiting in line to catch 'a glimpse of the divine.'" While in line, he unsuccessfully hits on a woman. When he finally meets God, he is taken aback, and can only spout gibberish. The point of the song is that having questions for God would cease to be relevant if one were to confront God face-to-face due to the enormity of such a theoretical situation.

"Dazzling Blue"
A 27-second sample of "Dazzling Blue", which incorporated elements of African and Indian music

"Dazzling Blue" is based on his relationship with wife Edie Brickell, and the title references her favorite color. "The CAT scan's eye sees what the heart's concealing", sang Simon over African cadences and Indian tablas, before marvelling at how his wife and he "were born beneath a star of dazzling blue". He said the song reminded him of his work as a part of Simon & Garfunkel. "Rewrite" features segments of recordings made on a small digital recorder by Brickell on a 2009 family trip together in Kenya. Simon was frustrated over the guitar tone in his song and attached the sound of a wildebeest to a certain guitar note each time it occurred, in an effort to create an interesting sound. The song contains nighttime ambience recorded during the trip. It was written about a burned out Vietnam veteran imagining that he could rewrite his life, in order to give it a happy ending. "Love and Hard Times" is an affirmation of love for Brickell. The beginning of the song references “God and his only son” visiting Earth. Simon noted that the song's thesis is being thankful at the highest level. The track contains orchestral arrangement from Gil Goldstein, which was recorded at Avatar Studios, as Ramone wanted a larger room to record in.

"Questions for the Angels" includes a reference to American rapper Jay-Z, which was inspired by a billboard featuring him that was present over the Brooklyn Bridge for a time. Simon mentioned that he would pass it on his way to the Brooklyn Academy of Music when they were holding a month-long celebration of his music in April 2008. Simon included the line to create a sharp transition from angels in Heaven to a downtown Brooklyn street. "So Beautiful or So What" contains what Simon once admitted is "one of [his] favorite Bo Diddley rhythms", and the song's title references Miles Davis's "So What". The title is a question Simon envisioned when facing the enormity of the infinite. The song almost became a collaboration with Bob Dylan; Simon felt two verses might be nice for him and sent him a message through their mutual manager. Although Dylan said that he liked the song, Simon did not hear back in sufficient time, as the album was on a deadline.

== Marketing and sales ==
Many songs from So Beautiful or So What were made available in various forms before their release on the album. "Rewrite" and "Love and Hard Times" appeared in Simon's 2008 book Lyrics; 1964-2008, "Questions for the Angels" was included on the 2009 Starbucks compilation This Better Be Good, and the lead single "Getting Ready for Christmas Day" premiered on National Public Radio on November 16, 2010. On April 5, 2011, So Beautiful or So What was available for streaming on the album's website of the same name for the week preceding its official release. It was released on formats including digital download, vinyl LP, and a CD deluxe edition with a DVD featuring footage of Simon's live performances at Webster Hall. Rolling Stone held a sweepstakes for fans to win a collector's edition box set, which was released in a limited amount of 1,000 copies and included the CD/DVD deluxe edition, a vinyl copy, and a 12' x 12' lithograph and replica notebook.

In the first week of the album's release, it debuted at number four on the Billboard 200 and sold 68,000 copies in the United States. It was Simon's highest chart debut on the chart, and by October 2011, it had sold 254,000 copies in the US. In the United Kingdom, it debuted at number six on the British albums chart, selling 21,993 copies in its first week. It was Simon's ninth top-ten solo album in the UK. In April 2016, the album reached sales of 319,000 copies in the US.

== Critical reception ==
Professional ratings
Aggregate scores
Source	Rating
AnyDecentMusic?	7.9/10
Metacritic	85/100
Review scores
Source	Rating
AllMusic	4.5/5 stars
The Daily Telegraph	5/5 stars
Entertainment Weekly	B+
The Guardian	4/5 stars
The Independent	3/5 stars
MSN Music (Expert Witness)	A
Pitchfork	6.7/10
Rolling Stone	4/5 stars
The Times	4/5 stars
USA Today	3.5/4 stars

So Beautiful or So What was met with widespread critical acclaim. At Metacritic, which assigns a normalized rating out of 100 to reviews from mainstream publications, the album received an average score of 85, based on 27 reviews. Many critics compared its diverse influences to the music of Simon's 1986 album Graceland.

Reviewing the album for AllMusic, senior editor Stephen Thomas Erlewine said So Beautiful or So What sounded not only focused but "vivid, vibrant, and current in a way none of [Simon's] peers have managed to achieve". Los Angeles Times writer Margaret Wappler praised its "multiethnic landscape" of American folk and Afropop influences on an album that is his best since 1990's Rhythm of the Saints. In The New York Times, Jon Pareles took note of Simon's lyrics: "Sketches of individuals and moments are intertwined with grander pronouncements; unforced humor tempers gloomier reflections". Will Hodgkinson from The Times believed his meditations on the afterlife are informed by both youthful enthusiasm and the wisdom of old age, while The Guardian's Maddy Costa said Simon "finds an answer to the ineffable in song".

Many reviewers took note of the rather overt religious symbolism in Simon's lyrics; one Irish blogger facetiously called So Beautiful or So What the year's best Christian music album, while American evangelical journalist Cathleen Falsani said it was the most significant record of spiritually reflective music in recent years. Writing for MSN Music, Robert Christgau found Simon's usual folk rock "graced with global colors that sound as natural" as his guitar and said his lyrics are imbued with gratitude for his wife's love and God, although he disagreed with Simon's view of God's benevolent nature.

Some critics were less receptive. Pitchfork reviewer Stephen M. Deusner said the record "can be stodgy in its emotions and a bit too devoted to its motifs", and Simon "too preoccupied with the 20th century", although his down-to-earth lyrical allusions helped rescue the album from the "solemn, end-of-life affairs" of other albums by older musicians. Andy Gill from The Independent was more critical, finding much of Simon's ruminations on love, age, and mortality trivial. He named "Love Is Eternal Sacred Light" as a highlight but still felt its evocation of the singer's 1986 song "The Boy in the Bubble" made it seem predictable coming from Simon.

At the end of 2011, So Beautiful or So What appeared on several top-ten lists curated by music publications. Rolling Stone named it the year's 3rd best record, while Mojo ranked it 15th. It was voted the 14th best album of the year in The Village Voice's Pazz & Jop, an annual poll of American critics nationwide. Christgau, the poll's creator, ranked it 3rd on his year-end list for The Barnes & Noble Review. Years later, he said So Beautiful or So What and Simon's 2016 album Stranger to Stranger had remained the singer's "21st century prizes".

== Track listing ==
All songs written by Paul Simon.

1. "Getting Ready for Christmas Day" – 4:06
2. "The Afterlife" – 3:40
3. "Dazzling Blue" – 4:32
4. "Rewrite" – 3:49
5. "Love and Hard Times" – 4:09
6. "Love Is Eternal Sacred Light" – 4:02
7. "Amulet" – 1:36
8. "Questions for the Angels" – 3:49
9. "Love & Blessings" – 4:18
10. "So Beautiful or So What" – 4:07

Sample credits

- "Getting Ready for Christmas Day" contains excerpts from the 1941 sermon of the same name by Reverend J. M. Gates with congregation.
- "Love Is Eternal Sacred Light" contains excerpts from "Train Whistle Blues".
- "Love & Blessings" contains excerpts from "Golden Gate Gospel Train", recorded by The Golden Gate Jubilee Quartet in 1938.

== Personnel ==
Credits are adapted from the album's liner notes.

- Mary Abt – clarinet
- Chris Bear – electronics
- Edie Brickell – background vocals
- Greg Calbi – mastering
- Elvis Costello – liner notes
- Sara Cutler – flute, harp
- Desiree Elsevier – viola
- David Finck – bass
- Geoff Gans – art direction, art design
- Sven Geier – cover image
- Gil Goldstein – arranger
- Steve Gorn – bansuri
- Skip La Plante – gong, harp, wind chimes
- Doyle Lawson – background vocals
- Jeanne LeBlanc – cello
- Diane Lesser – horn
- Vincent Lionti – viola
- Richard Locker – cello
- Karaikudi R. Mani – ensemble percussion, vocal percussion
- Elizabeth Mann – flute
- Lois Martin – viola
- Kevin Mazur – band photo
- Vincent Nguini – acoustic guitar, electric guitar
- Jim Oblon – bass, drums, electric guitar, slide guitar, percussion
- Charles Pillow – clarinet
- Phil Ramone – mixing, production
- Mick Rossi – piano
- Mark Seliger – photography
- Steve Shehan – angklung, bass, brushes, crotale, cymbals, djembe, glass harp, resonator, saz, stick and talking drum
- Lulu Simon – background vocals
- Paul Simon – bells, composer, glockenspiel, lyricist, percussion, production, vocals, whistle, twelve-string guitar, acoustic guitar, electric guitar, nylon string guitar
- Yacouba Sissoko – kora
- Pamela Sklar – flute
- Andy Smith – engineer
- Etienne Stadwijk – celeste
- Joshua Swift – Dobro
- Michael White – clarinet
- Gabe Witcher – fiddle
- Nancy Zeltsman – marimba

== Charts ==
=== Weekly charts ===
Chart (2011)	Peak position
Australian Albums (ARIA)	41
Austrian Albums (Ö3 Austria)	13
Belgian Albums (Ultratop Flanders)	20
Belgian Albums (Ultratop Wallonia)	29
Canadian Albums (Billboard)	7
Czech Albums (ČNS IFPI)	8
Danish Albums (Hitlisten)	6
Dutch Albums (Album Top 100)	6
Finnish Albums (Suomen virallinen lista)	49
French Albums (SNEP)	38
German Albums (Offizielle Top 100)	20
Irish Albums (IRMA)	7
Italian Albums (FIMI)	29
Japanese Albums (Oricon)	75
New Zealand Albums (RMNZ)	23
Norwegian Albums (VG-lista)	2
Scottish Albums (OCC)	6
Spanish Albums (PROMUSICAE)	40
Swedish Albums (Sverigetopplistan)	4
Swiss Albums (Schweizer Hitparade)	21
UK Albums (OCC)	6
US Billboard 200	4
US Top Rock Albums (Billboard)	2

=== Year-end charts ===
Chart (2011)	Position
Danish Albums (Hitlisten)	95
Dutch Albums (Album Top 100)	99
US Billboard 200	131
US Top Rock Albums (Billboard)	20

== Certifications ==
Region	Certification	Certified units/sales
United Kingdom (BPI)	Silver	60,000^{^}
^{^} Shipments figures based on certification alone.

== Release history ==
Region	Date
Australia	April 8, 2011
Germany	April 8, 2011
Netherlands	April 8, 2011
Denmark	April 11, 2011
France	April 11, 2011
Italy	April 12, 2011
United States	April 12, 2011
Japan	April 20, 2011
Ireland	June 10, 2011
United Kingdom	June 13, 2011

== See also ==
- 2011 in American music
- 2011 in British music charts
