= Wristband (song) =

Single by Paul Simon

from the album Stranger to Stranger
- Released: April 7, 2016
- Genre: Folk rock
- Length: 3:17
- Label: Concord
- Songwriter: Paul Simon
- Producers: Paul Simon; Roy Halee

Paul Simon singles chronology
"The Afterlife" (2011)	"Wristband" (2016)	"Cool Papa Bell" (2016)

"Wristband" is a song by American singer-songwriter Paul Simon. It was the first single from his album Stranger to Stranger (2016), released on Concord Records.

== Background and composition ==
Simon collaborates with the Italian electronic dance music artist Clap! Clap! on "Wristband". Simon was introduced to him in 2015 by his son Adrian, who was a fan of his work. "Wristband" tells a narrative about a rock musician unable to gain entry into his own concert because he lacks the wristband required. The singer tries to persuade the security guard to let him in, and cannot even gain admittance to the backstage without the right pass. The song eventually transitions into a larger symbol of outrage of underprivileged people "whose anger is a shorthand / For you'll never get a wristband." Peter Ames Carlin writes, "It is an archetypal Paul Simon move: bridging the personal and the social, the silly with the serious, the frivolous and the absolutely essential." "It's not a true story," said Simon. "But I know plenty of people with this story and there have been times where I've been stopped backstage and asked to [show] a pass."

The song is composed in the key of E♭ major (Mixolydian mode), with Paul Simon's vocal range spanning from E♭_{4} to E♭_{5}, according to the sheet music published at Musicnotes.com by Sony/ATV Music Publishing.

== Release and reception ==
Simon premiered the song on the National Public Radio series Live from Here with Chris Thile on February 6, 2016. "Wristband", as the first single from Stranger to Stranger, was released online on April 7, 2016. The song peaked at #14 on the Adult Alternative Songs chart on May 21. Simon performed the song on Austin City Limits in September, a performance that National Public Radio praised as a "playfully infectious version of the song". Stereogum described the song as "a rhythmic groove that finds Simon spinning a tale of getting locked out of a venue while taking a smoke break into a meditation on the perpetuation of social inequality."

== Personnel ==
- Paul Simon – lead and backing vocals
- Keith Montie – backing vocals
- Carlos Henrique – bass
- Clap! Clap! – electronic drums, synthesizer, samples
- Jamey Haddad – handclaps, percussion
- Nino de los Reyes – handclaps, percussion
- Oscar de los Reyes – handclaps, percussion
- Sergio Martínez – handclaps, percussion
- Andy Snitzer – saxophone, backing vocals
- C.J. Camerieri – trumpet

== Bibliography ==
- Carlin, Peter Ames (2016). Homeward Bound: The Life of Paul Simon. Henry Holt and Co. ISBN 978-1-627-79034-5.
