= A Virtual World =

Studio album by Metalite
- Released: 26 March 2021
- Genre: Power metal
- Length: 47:48
- Label: AFM Records
- Producer: Edwin Premberg

Metalite chronology
Biomechanicals (2019)	A Virtual World (2021)	Expedition One (2024)

Professional ratings
Review scores
Source	Rating
Metal.de	5/10
Powermetal.de	6/10
Rock Hard	4/10
Sonic Perspectives	8.6/10
Soundscape Magazine	8/10

A Virtual World is the third studio album by Swedish power metal band Metalite, released on 26 March 2021.

== Track listing ==
All lyrics are written by Edwin Premberg, except "Peacekeepers" which is written by Ulf Roos; all music is composed by Edwin Premberg.

No.	Title	Length
1.	"A Virtual World"	4:02
2.	"Cloud Connected"	3:48
3.	"Talisman"	4:58
4.	"Beyond the Horizon"	4:55
5.	"Peacekeepers"	4:12
6.	"The Vampire Song"	3:52
7.	"We're like the Fire"	4:14
8.	"Artificial Intelligence"	4:40
9.	"Alone"	4:44
10.	"Running"	4:05
11.	"Synchronized"	4:18
Total length:		47:48

Japanese edition bonus track
No.	Title	Length
12.	"Riders of the Storm"	4:42
Total length:		52:30

== Personnel ==
- Erica Ohlsson – vocals
- Robert Örnesved – guitars
- Edwin Premberg – guitars, keyboards, additional vocals, production
- Robert Majd – bass
- Lea Larsson – drums
