= Zendegi Pas Az Zendegi =

Iranian reality TV series (2020–2025)

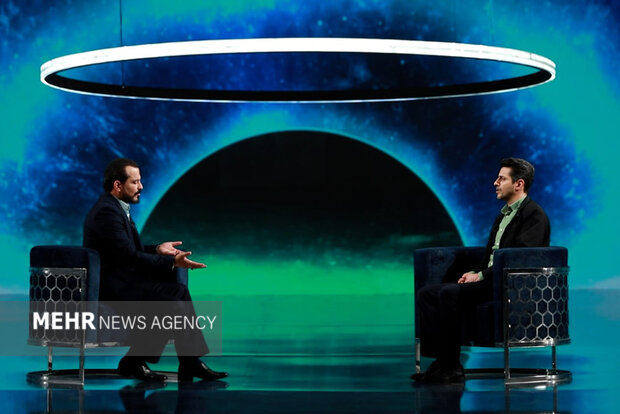
- Created by: Abbas Mowzoon
- Presented by: Abbas Mowzoon
- Opening theme: Introduction
- Country of origin: Iran
- Original language: Persian
- No. of seasons: 6
- No. of episodes: 122

Production
- Camera setup: Multi-camera
- Running time: Daily during Ramadan

Original release
- Network: IRIB TV4
- Release: May 25, 2020 – April 1, 2025

Zendegi Pas Az Zendegi (Persian: زندگی پس از زندگی, meaning "Life after life") is an Iranian television program dealing with near-death experiences of various people invited to IRIB TV4 during Ramadan. The program is directed, produced and hosted by Abbas Mowzoon, and aired daily from 2020 to 2025 (six seasons) during Ramadan. According to the survey of the Islamic Republic of Iran Broadcasting, the second and third seasons of this program were the most watched programs before breaking the fast among different TV channels.

== Description ==
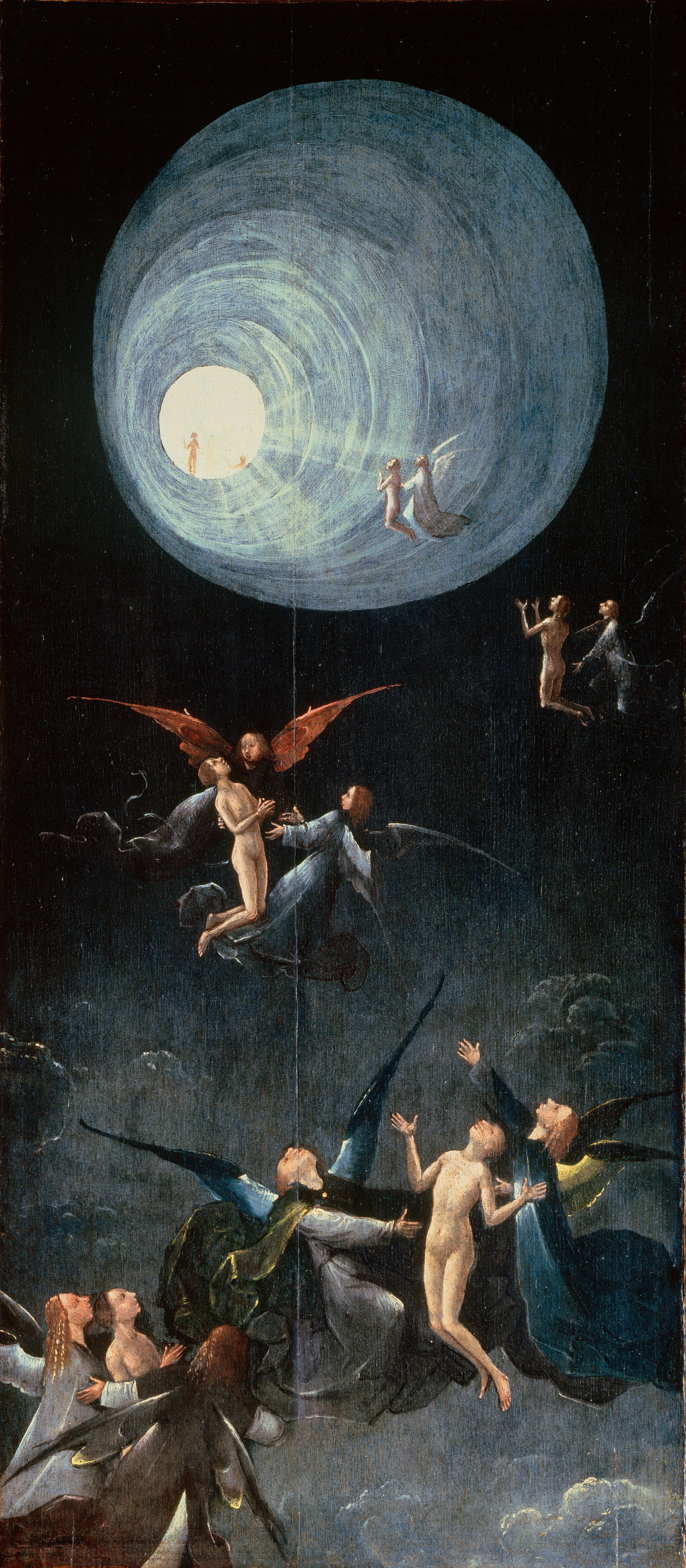
Ascent of the Blessed by Hieronymus Bosch is associated by some NDE researchers with aspects of the NDE.

Zendegi Pas Az Zendegi (Life after Life) is a program about death and the afterlife according to the narratives of people who left the physical body in the near-death experience and understood the world of Barzakh (purgatory) and returned. According to Abbas Mowzoon, the guests of the program go through several filters to verify the appropriateness of the time and the quality of the experience of the presence of a second witness, etc. In this program, 12 experts are chosen as the guests of the program, including Iranian Zoroastrians and rabbis, two German professors who have opinions and books about this topic and its background, as well as anesthesiologists and physicians who have professional experience in this field.

== See also ==
- Life After Life (disambiguation)
