= Pardon My French (collective) =

EDM collective

- Origin: France
- Genres: Trap; hip hop; electro house; dubstep; future house; bass house; deep house
- Occupations: DJ; record producer
- Years active: 2015–present
- Labels: Interscope, Mad Decent (DJ Snake); Spinnin' Records (DJ Snake, Tchami & Mercer); Confession (Tchami & Malaa)
- Members: DJ Snake; Tchami; Mercer; Malaa
- Website: pmf.store

Pardon My French is a collective of four French DJs composed of DJ Snake, Tchami, Mercer and Malaa, created in 2015. The goal of this collective is to promote electronic music in the world, but also to bring together French artists to share their passion for music.

== Members ==
=== DJ Snake ===
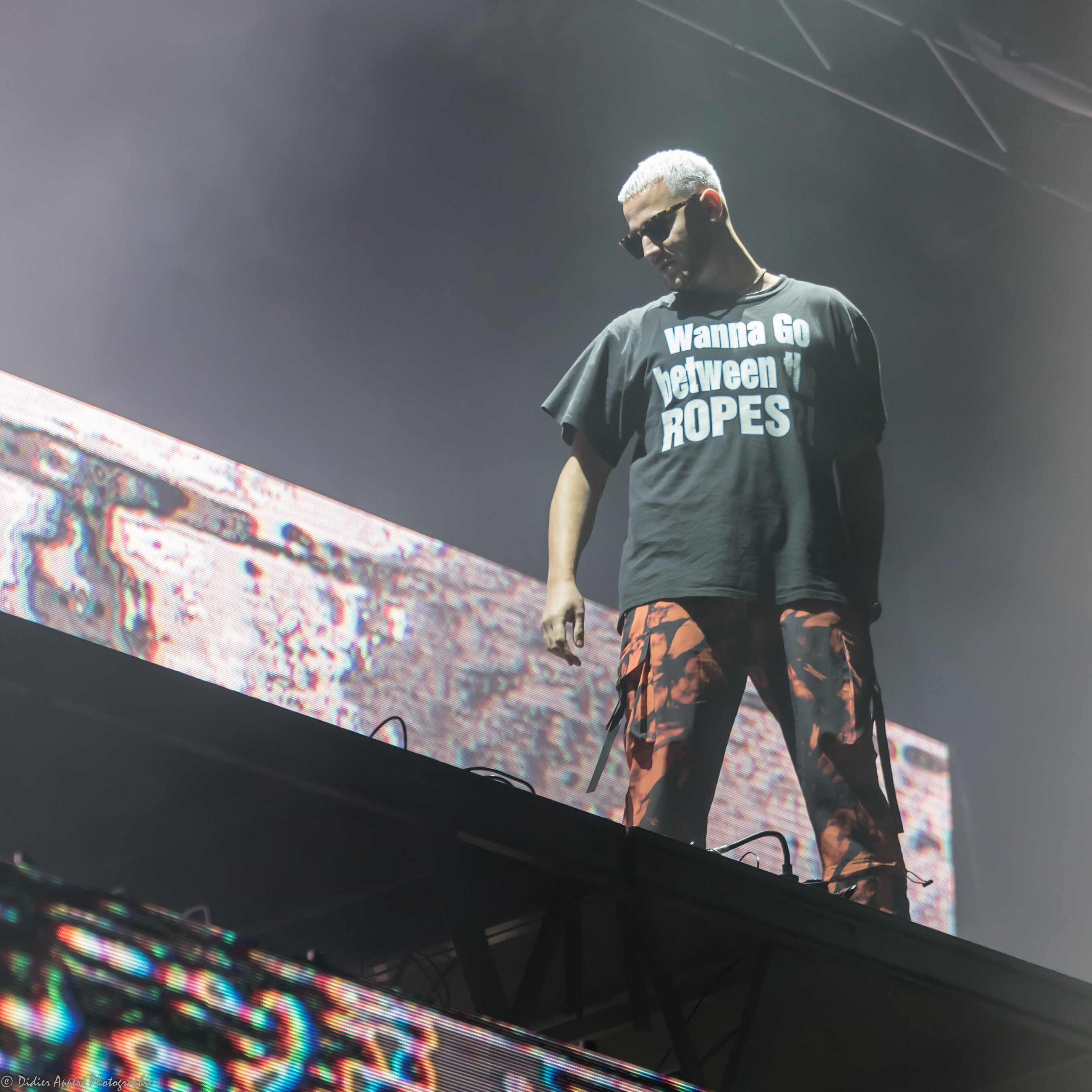
DJ Snake in 2019

DJ Snake released his 1st album on August 5, 2016 and went platinum in less than a month. He headlined the Olympia in February 2016, then the Zenith on November 25, 2016, and the AccorHotels Arena on February 24, 2018. He says:

Pardon My French, this is a concept we created with our team, which is to promote French electronic music around the world, without real headache, without format, without code, just really in order to please and make the audience smack.

=== Tchami ===
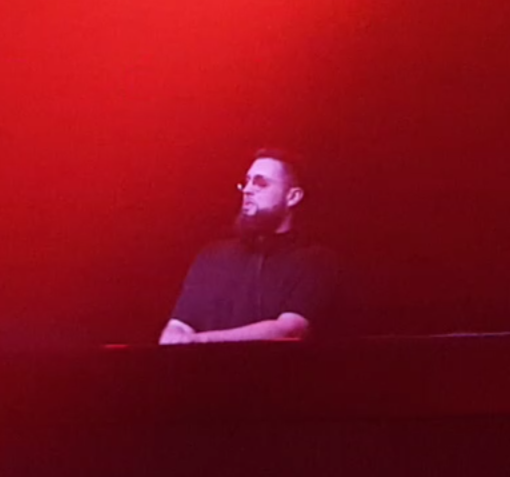
Tchami Performing at Rebel, Toronto

Tchami released his single After Life , from his first EP of the same name, on December 22, 2015. At the end of the year, he founded the label Confession. Tchami stood out by creating many remixes and original productions that put him in the DJ Mag Top 100, in 62nd place in 2015. He returned in the DJ Mag Top 100 in 2017, at 95th Place. He returned to France for a concert at the Olympia on 1 December 2016, with Malaa, who makes his first part of his set. He says:

So what you need to know is that we know each other since we were 15 years old. We come from the same area in Paris, and we have always made music together. Today, it is true that we all have our solo careers, but Pardon My French is really the opportunity to meet on a common project.

=== Mercer ===
Mercer has released several titles on the Dutch label Spinnin' Records, and collaborated with DJ Snake on the track' 'Lunatic' '. In 2018, he released Satisfy featuring Ron Carroll. He says:

The atmosphere was great. It could not be otherwise because we share between friends, we know each other very well, we know that there will be no problem, it's just excitement. There is no apprehension, no anguish, it is only kiff. We felt supported because we saw a lot of French flags, people made a lot of PMF signs, they had mascots ... It was phew! Frankly, we keep great memories of this tour.

=== Malaa ===
Malaa is the mysterious, hooded character of Pardon My French. The Parisian DJ and producer is regarded as part of the new wave of house music. Malaa has released remixes on songs by DJ Snake and Tchami.

== Merchandise ==
In 2016, the members of this collective decided to create their brand of clothing. Pardon My French products are marketed on the official online store. The brand has punctually ephemeral shops, during an event of one or more artists, lasting a day or two days, worldwide. In Paris, DJ Snake opens the first boutique, located on the Quai de la Mégisserie, on the weekend of July 22 and 23, 2017. A second boutique, opened on February 23, 2018 at the Léon Beaubourg space, to present the new collection spring-summer 2018. On February 24, the Levi's brand joins forces with this brand for a limited collection.

== Pardon My French Tour ==
In 2016, DJ Snake announces that he will have a tour of the United States Pardon My French Tour tour, with Tchami, Mercer and Malaa, at six locations. He added two more dates on December 28 and 29. In 2017, DJ Snake announces three "limited edition" dates for Pardon My French in Ibiza with Tchami, Mercer and Malaa, including two in July and one in August. He also announces five other dates in Cap d'Agde, whose members organize their own evening. He adds Martin Solveig, Aazar and Dombresky in this collective, the time of an evening, to promote French music. In 2019, DJ Snake announces a date of Pardon My French at Red Rocks Amphitheater.

=== Dates ===
2016

- 8 April, at Chicago
- 9 April, at Detroit
- 15 April, at Dallas
- 22 April, at Philadelphia
- 23 April, at Washington
- 30 April, at San Francisco
- 28 December, at New York
- 29 December, at Los Angeles

2017

- 5 July, at Ibiza
- 12 July, at Ibiza
- 31 July, at Cap d'Agde (Martin Solveig)
- 7 August, at Cap d'Agde (Malaa and Mercer)
- 14 August, at Cap d'Agde (DJ Snake)
- 21 August, at Cap d'Agde (Tchami)
- 28 August, at Cap d'Agde (Aazar and Dombresky)
- 30 August, at Ibiza

2019

- 26 April, at Red Rocks Amphitheatre
