= Stranger to Stranger =

Studio album by Paul Simon
- Released: June 3, 2016
- Recorded: Spring/Summer 2011 – April 2016
- Studios: Simon's cottage (New Canaan, Connecticut); Montclair State University (Montclair, New Jersey)
- Genres: Pop, experimental
- Length: 36:50 (standard edition); 53:24 (deluxe edition)
- Label: Concord
- Producers: Paul Simon; Roy Halee

Paul Simon chronology
The Ultimate Collection (2015)	Stranger to Stranger (2016)	In the Blue Light (2018)

Singles from Stranger to Stranger
- 1. "Wristband" Released: April 7, 2016; 2. "Cool Papa Bell" Released: April 28, 2016; 3. "The Werewolf" Released: May 19, 2016

Stranger to Stranger is the thirteenth solo studio album by American folk rock singer-songwriter Paul Simon. Produced by Paul Simon and Roy Halee, it was released on June 3, 2016, through Concord Records. Simon wrote the material over a period of several years, perfecting it and rewriting it to his liking. Its music is experimental, making use of custom-made instruments by composer and music theorist Harry Partch. Three of the songs on the album are collaborations with Italian electronic artist Clap! Clap!.

His first release in over five years, Stranger to Stranger received wide critical acclaim. It represented Simon's highest-ever debut on the Billboard 200, at No. 3, and reached No. 1 on the UK Albums Chart.

The cover art is a detail of a portrait of Simon from 2011 by Chuck Close. Photo by Kerry Ryan McFate, courtesy Pace Gallery.

== Background ==
Simon began writing new material shortly after releasing his twelfth studio album, So Beautiful or So What, in April 2011. Simon collaborates with the Italian electronic dance music artist Clap! Clap! on three songs—"The Werewolf", "Street Angel", and "Wristband". Simon was introduced to him by his son, Adrian, who was a fan of his work. The two met up in July 2011 when Simon was touring behind So Beautiful or So What in Milan, Italy. He and Clap! Clap! worked together via email over the course of making the album. Simon also worked with longtime friend Roy Halee, who is listed as co-producer on the album. Halee, who had retired years earlier, was mostly recruited to advise on how to create natural echo. He was unfamiliar with Pro Tools, so Simon helped him with it. "I always liked working with him more than anyone else", Simon noted.

== Composition ==
Andy Greene of Rolling Stone dubbed Stranger to Stranger an "experimental album heavy on echo and rhythm that fuses electronic beats with African woodwind instruments, Peruvian drums, a gospel music quartet, horns and synthesizers." The album makes use of custom-made instruments, such as the Cloud-Chamber Bowls and the Chromelodeon, which were created by music theorist Harry Partch in the mid-twentieth century. Simon briefly moved the sessions to Montclair State University, where the instruments are stored, in 2013 in order to employ them on the album. "Parch said there were 43 tones to an octave and not 12", Simon remarked in Rolling Stone. "He had a totally different approach to what music is and had to build his own instruments so he could compose on a microtonal scale. That microtonal thinking pervades this album."

"The Werewolf" centers around a werewolf, also an angel of death, who is looking for victims. The song's origins came from Simon and his band experimenting with slowing down the tempo of a recording they made of the Peruvian percussion instrument Cajón, the Indian instrument gopichand, and hand claps. "Wristband" creates a narrative around a rock musician unable to gain entry into his own concert because he lacks the wristband required. "The Riverbank" was inspired by a teacher that Simon personally knew who was killed in the Sandy Hook Elementary School shooting in December 2012. It also takes root in a visit Simon made to wounded veterans at Walter Reed Hospital. "Proof of Love" and "In the Garden of Edie", meanwhile, stand as tributes to Simon's wife, musician Edie Brickell. The album also has continuity, with characters reappearing in songs. "The idea of finishing one song and having the character appear in another song appeals to me. I don't see why characters shouldn't appear more than once", said Simon. The instrumentals "The Clock" and "In the Garden of Edie" function as interludes, designed to give listeners "space". The two tracks were originally composed for John Patrick Shanley's play Prodigal Son, but went unused.

== Release ==
Stranger to Stranger was first announced when Simon announced his tour dates in February 2016. It was officially announced with the lead single "Wristband" premiering online on April 7, 2016.

== Critical reception ==
Professional ratings
Aggregate scores
Source	Rating
AnyDecentMusic?	7.9/10
Metacritic	85/100
Review scores
Source	Rating
AllMusic	4/5 stars
Entertainment Weekly	A−
The Guardian	5/5 stars
The Independent	4/5 stars
The Irish Times	4/5 stars
Pitchfork	7.2/10
Rolling Stone	4/5 stars
Spin	6/10
USA Today	4/4 stars
Vice	A−

Stranger to Stranger received widespread critical acclaim. At Metacritic, which assigns a normalized rating out of 100 to reviews from mainstream publications, the album received an average score of 85, based on 25 reviews. In Rolling Stone, Will Hermes said it was "as inviting, immaculately produced, jokey and unsettled a record as any he has ever made", while The Guardian's Jon Dennis found the album "as rewarding as anything" Simon had recorded before, showcasing a "tenacious pursuit of new sounds". Jonathan Bernstein of Entertainment Weekly called Stranger to Stranger "one of his very boldest collections to date", an album "brimming with concepts and sounds that push Simon’s musical boundaries further than ever".

Randy Lewis from the Los Angeles Times believed the record was "pop music at its most artful and relevant, a sentiment from a septuagenarian representative of rock’s old guard that's arguably as potent as anything from seemingly more streetwise artists one-third his age". The Independent's Andy Gill hailed it as Simon's "best in several years", and Steve Smith of The Boston Globe considered it his "richest, most instantly appealing collection since Graceland (1986)". Dan Weiss was somewhat less impressed in Spin, lamenting the music's "novelty electronics", which he said "make everything feel sillier than it is (not inherently a bad thing), but they also fail to get into a groove (which is)".

=== Accolades ===
Publication	Accolade	Year	Rank	Ref.
Billboard	10 Best Rock/Alternative Albums of 2016	2016	7	
Entertainment Weekly	The 50 Best Albums of 2016	2016	23	
Mojo	The 50 Best Albums of 2016	2016	8	
Paste	The 50 Best Albums of 2016	2016	46	
Rolling Stone	50 Best Albums of 2016	2016	13	

== Commercial performance ==
The album debuted at No. 1 on the UK Albums Chart, selling 19,218 copies in its first week. At the age of 74, Paul Simon was the oldest male solo artist to chart at No. 1 in the UK. It is his first No. 1 studio album since 1990's The Rhythm of the Saints. In the United States, Stranger to Stranger debuted at No. 3 on the Billboard 200 with first-week sales of 68,000 units. The album was the overall best-selling album for the week based on pure album sales (67,000 copies). It is Simon's highest charting album in over 29 years, since Graceland (1986).

== Track listing ==
All tracks are written by Paul Simon.

Stranger to Stranger – Standard edition
No.	Title	Length
1.	"The Werewolf"	3:25
2.	"Wristband"	3:17
3.	"The Clock"	1:02
4.	"Street Angel"	2:11
5.	"Stranger to Stranger"	4:35
6.	"In a Parade"	2:21
7.	"Proof of Love"	5:44
8.	"In the Garden of Edie"	1:48
9.	"The Riverbank"	4:11
10.	"Cool Papa Bell"	4:02
11.	"Insomniac's Lullaby"	4:33

Stranger to Stranger – Deluxe edition
No.	Title	Writer(s)	Length
12.	"Horace and Pete"		2:30
13.	"Duncan" (live from A Prairie Home Companion February 2016)		4:43
14.	"Wristband" (live from A Prairie Home Companion)		3:28
15.	"Guitar Piece 3"		1:10
16.	"New York Is My Home" (with Dion)	Dion DiMucci; Mike Aquilina; Scott Kempner	4:30

== Personnel ==
- Paul Simon – vocals, acoustic guitar, electric guitar, autoharp, baritone guitar, bass harmonica, celeste, chromelodeon, clock, glockenspiel, gopichand, harmonium, mbira, percussion, twelve-string guitar
- Bobby Allende – congas
- David Broome – chromelodeon
- C.J. Camerieri – French horn, trumpet
- Clap! Clap! – electronic drums, programming, synthesizer
- Jack DeJohnette – drums (tracks 9 and 11)
- Dean Drummond – bamboo marimba, zoomoozophone
- Dave Eggar – cello
- Alan Ferber, Wycliffe Gordon – trombone
- Gil Goldstein – string arrangements
- Golden Gate Quartet – backing vocals
- Nelson González – maracas, très
- Jamey Haddad – brushes, hadjira, percussion
- Paul Halley – Hammond organ
- Carlos Henriquez, Bakithi Kumalo – bass guitar
- Katie Kresek – viola
- Steve Marion – slide guitar
- Sergio Martínez – handclaps, percussion
- Bobby McFerrin, Keith Montie – backing vocals
- Nico Muhly – celeste, orchestra bells, horn and flute arrangements
- Vincent Nguini – electric guitar, acoustic guitar
- Jim Oblon – drums, programming, electronic drums, percussion
- Nino de los Reyes – handclaps, percussion
- Oscar de los Reyes – handclaps, percussion
- Marcus Rojas – tuba
- Mick Rossi – glockenspiel, harmonium, piano, Fender Rhodes
- Andy Snitzer – saxophone, backing vocals
- Jared Soldiviero – bamboo marimba, bowed marimba, cloud chamber bowls, harmonic canon
- Alex Sopp – flute
- Mark Stewart – big boing mbira, trombadoo

== Charts ==
=== Weekly charts ===
Chart (2016)	Peak position
Australian Albums (ARIA)	24
Austrian Albums (Ö3 Austria)	7
Belgian Albums (Ultratop Flanders)	2
Belgian Albums (Ultratop Wallonia)	9
Canadian Albums (Billboard)	4
Czech Albums (ČNS IFPI)	3
Danish Albums (Hitlisten)	18
Dutch Albums (Album Top 100)	8
Finnish Albums (Suomen virallinen lista)	37
French Albums (SNEP)	51
German Albums (Offizielle Top 100)	14
Irish Albums (IRMA)	2
Italian Albums (FIMI)	26
Japanese Albums (Oricon)	67
New Zealand Albums (RMNZ)	8
Norwegian Albums (VG-lista)	9
Scottish Albums (Official Charts)	1
Spanish Albums (Promusicae)	36
Swedish Albums (Sverigetopplistan)	9
Swiss Albums (Schweizer Hitparade)	9
UK Albums (Official Charts)	1
US Billboard 200	3
US Top Rock Albums (Billboard)	1

=== Year-end charts ===
Chart (2016)	Position
Belgian Albums (Ultratop Flanders)	80
Belgian Albums (Ultratop Wallonia)	130
US Top Rock Albums (Billboard)	19

=== Certifications ===
Region	Certification	Certified units/sales
United Kingdom (BPI)	Silver	60,000^{‡}
^{‡} Sales+streaming figures based on certification alone.
