= Expedition One (album) =

Studio album by Metalite
- Released: 19 January 2024
- Genre: Power metal
- Length: 67:40
- Label: AFM Records
- Producer: Edwin Premberg

Metalite chronology
A Virtual World (2021)	Expedition One (2024)	Discovery (2026)

Professional ratings
Review scores
Source	Rating
Metal.de	5/10
Powermetal.de	7/10
Rock Hard	4.5/10
Scream Magazine	3/6

Expedition One is the fourth studio album by Swedish power metal band Metalite, released on 19 January 2024. The album was preceded by four singles, "Disciples of the Stars", "Blazing Skies", "New Generation", and "Aurora".

== Track listing ==
All lyrics are written by Edwin Premberg, except "Disciples of the Stars" which is written by Robert Majd, and "Utopia" which is an instrumental; all music is composed by Edwin Premberg, with "Disciples of the Stars" co-written by Robert Majd, "Utopia" co-written by Robert Örnesved, and "Take My Hand" co-written by Thomas Berglund.

No.	Title	Length
1.	"Expedition One"	4:02
2.	"Aurora"	4:13
3.	"CtrlAltDel"	4:56
4.	"Cyberdome"	4:47
5.	"Blazing Skies"	4:27
6.	"Outer Worlds"	4:20
7.	"New Generation"	3:58
8.	"In My Dreams"	4:05
9.	"Disciples of the Stars"	4:28
10.	"Free"	3:40
11.	"Legendary"	5:01
12.	"Paradise"	4:47
13.	"Sanctum of Light"	3:39
14.	"Utopia"	3:44
15.	"Take My Hand" (bonus track)	3:15
16.	"Hurricane" (bonus track)	4:18

== Personnel ==
- Erica Ohlsson – vocals
- Robert Örnesved – guitars
- Edwin Premberg – guitars, keyboards, additional vocals, production
- Robert Majd – bass
- Lea Larsson – drums
