= Life After Death (disambiguation) =

Life After Death is a 1997 hip hop album by The Notorious B.I.G.

Life after Death may also refer to:

- Life After Death (Natas album), a 1992 hip hop album
- Life After Death (The Creepshow album), a 2013 psychobilly album
- Life After Death (TobyMac album), a 2022 album by TobyMac
- Life After Death (TV series), a 2020 Hong Kong television series
- Dead Like Me: Life After Death, a 2009 American film

== See also ==
- Afterlife, or life after death
- After death (disambiguation)
- Afterlife (disambiguation)
- Live After Death, an album by Iron Maiden
- "Life After Death and Taxes (Failure II)", a song by Relient K
- Life After Death Row, a documentary
- Life After Def, an album by Montell Jordan
- Life After Life (disambiguation)
- My Life After Death
- Resurrection of the dead
- World to come
- "On Life After Death", a song by the American band Bright from the album The Albatross Guest House
