= Malaa =

French musical artist

- Born: Paris, France
- Genres: Future house; ghetto house; tech house; bass house
- Occupations: DJ; record producer
- Instruments: Synthesizer; digital audio workstation
- Years active: 2015–present
- Label: Confession

Malaa is a French electronic dance music DJ and producer, who is signed to Tchami's label Confession. He broke onto the electronic music scene through his single "Notorious", which was the second release on Confession. His identity is unknown as he appears in public as a balaclava-wearing man. His participation in the Pardon My French collective suggests he is French, as all other members are.

== Identity ==
Currently, Malaa's identity is unknown. Some listeners were strongly suggested that Malaa consists of a duo in collaboration with DJ Snake and Tchami, as they are credited often on each other's track productions, and have been connected to the project by doing some remixes. It is also speculated that French DJ Mercer is involved in Malaa, since the same management team is shared between the three artists. Through a Reddit post made on the topic, Redditors discovered a tweet on Twitter where a user wrote "cant believe im opening for dj snake + tchami's side project next thursday", while linking to a SoundCloud mix by Malaa. The tweet was then favourited by DJ Snake's Twitter account, which hints his participation on the topic. French DJ Sebastien Benett is also speculated to be Malaa, due to the quick removal of a Facebook comment from Mercer's profile which stated that Malaa was a nickname of Benett and that the last posts by Benett on SoundCloud coincide with the first appearances of Malaa. Both have also been seen individually smoking cigarettes frequently. Benett was also part of the group of 5 dj's called 'Reepublic' before joining the Malaa project.

== Career ==
=== 2015–present ===
In September 2017, Malaa and French future house artist Tchami announced their "No Redemption" tour which was held in North America. To promote the tour event, they released a hip-hop influenced house track titled "Summer 99" on 29 September 2017.

Malaa is known for his "Who Is Malaa?" continuous mixes which he releases through SoundCloud, which feature ghetto house and future house tracks.

Malaa performed at the 22nd Coachella Valley Music and Arts Festival in April 2023.

=== Pardon My French ===
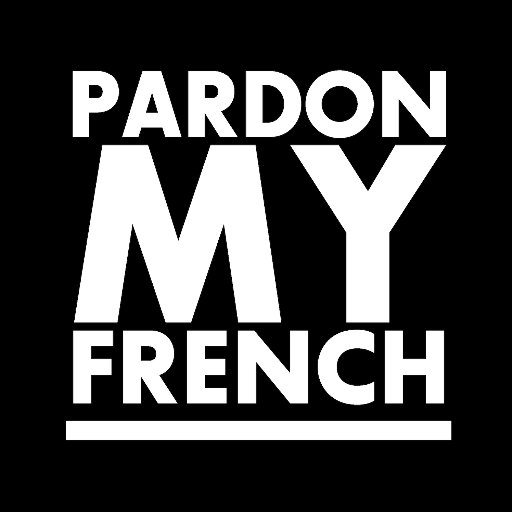
Pardon My French's logo

Malaa is currently part of the Pardon My French team, a collective of four French DJs composed of DJ Snake, Mercer, Tchami and himself. Throughout the year 2016 and early 2017, the collective went on a Pardon My French Tour in North America.

== Discography ==
=== Compilation albums ===
Title	Details
Illegal Mixtape	Released: 17 April 2017; Label: Confession; Formats: Digital download
Illegal Mixtape II	Released: 8 November 2018; Label: Confession; Formats: Digital download

=== Extended plays ===
Title	Details	Track Listing
Illicit	Released: 5 July 2016; Label: Confession; Format: Digital download	List: 1. "Illicit Intro"; 2. "Diamonds"; 3. "Frequency 75"; 4. "Danger"
No Redemption (with Tchami)	Released: 4 April 2018; Label: Confession; Format: Digital download	List: 1. "No Redemption Intro"; 2. "Summer '99"; 3. "Kurupt"; 4. "The Sermon"; 5. "Deus"

=== Singles ===
Year	Title	Album	Label
2015	"H+M"	Non-album singles	Self-released
2015	"Pregnant"	Non-album singles	Fool's Gold Records
2016	"Fade"	Non-album singles	Confession
2016	"Arsenic" (with Maximono)	Non-album singles	Confession
2016	"Diamonds"	Ilicit EP	Confession
2016	"Notorious"	Non-album singles	Confession
2016	"Prophecy" (with Tchami)	Non-album singles	Confession
2017	"Bylina"	Illegal Mixtape	Confession
2017	"Contagious"	Illegal Mixtape	Confession
2017	"Belleville"	Non-album singles	Confession
2017	"Paris 96"	Non-album singles	Self-released
2017	"Hostyl" (with Dombresky)	Non-album singles	Confession
2017	"Summer 99" (with Tchami]	No Redemption EP	Confession
2017	"The Sermon" (with Tchami)	No Redemption EP	Confession
2018	"Kurupt" (with Tchami)	No Redemption EP	Confession
2018	"Music Sounds Better with You" (with Noizu) (by Stardust)	Non-album singles	Self-released
2018	"Bling Bling"	Illegal Mixtape II	Confession
2018	"Cash Money"	Illegal Mixtape II	Confession
2018	"We Get Crunk"	Illegal Mixtape II	Confession
2019	"Addiction"	Non-album singles	Confession
2019	"Revolt" (featuring Jacknife)	Non-album singles	Premiere Classe Records
2019	"Criminals" (with Rezz)	Non-album singles	Rezz Music / Confession
2020	"OCB"	Non-album singles	Confession
2020	"Don't Talk"	Non-album singles	Confession
2020	"Hell" (with Koos)	Non-album singles	Confession
2020	"Riot Gear" (with Habstrakt)	Non-album singles	Confession
2021	"Ring the Alarm" (with DJ Snake)	Non-album singles	Interscope
2021	"Soul Trippin'"	Non-album singles	Illegal Music
2021	"Pondicherry" (with DJ Snake)	Non-album singles	Interscope
2021	"Who I Am"	Non-album singles	Illegal Music
2022	"Wait"	Non-album singles	Illegal Music
2022	"Outcast" (with Fivio Foreign)	Don Malaa.	Illegal Music

=== Remixes ===
List of remixes, showing year released and original artists
Title	Year	Original artist
"Lean On" (Malaa Remix)	2015	Major Lazer and DJ Snake (featuring MØ)
"White Iverson" (Malaa Remix)	2015	Post Malone
"After Life" (Malaa Remix)	2015	Tchami
"Can't Feel My Face" (Malaa Remix)	2015	The Weeknd
"Mind" (Malaa Remix)	2016	Jack Ü (featuring Kai)
"Oh Me Oh My" (Malaa Remix)	2017	DJ Snake
"Satisfy" (Malaa Remix)	2018	Mercer (featuring Ron Carroll)
"Music Sounds Better With You" (Malaa and Noizu Remix)	2018	Stardust
"Enzo" (Malaa Remix)	2019	DJ Snake and Sheck Wes (featuring Offset, 21 Savage and Gucci Mane)
"Someone Else" (Malaa Remix)	2020	Rezz and Grabbitz
"Trust Nobody" (Malaa Remix)	2020	DJ Snake
"Anything" (Malaa Remix)	2021	Alison Wonderland and Valentino Khan
"Pick Your Battles" (Malaa Remix)	2021	Petit Biscuit and Diplo
"Praise" (Malaa Remix)	2021	Tchami (featuring Gunna)
