= Music from Here =

Studio album by Ronnie Montrose
- Released: 1994
- Genre: Instrumental rock; hard rock
- Length: 52:29
- Label: Fearless Urge
- Producer: Ronnie Montrose

Ronnie Montrose chronology
Mutatis Mutandis (1991)	Music from Here (1994)	Mr. Bones (1996)

Music from Here is an album of instrumental rock music by Ronnie Montrose.

== Track listing ==
1. "Mr. Walker " (Ronnie Montrose) - 4:01
2. "Primary Function" (Montrose, Michele Graybeal, Craig McFarland) - 4:05
3. "Largemouth" (Montrose, Graybeal, McFarland) - 5:12
4. "Road to Reason" (Montrose, Graybeal, McFarland) - 4:37
5. "Life After Life" (Montrose, Graybeal, McFarland) - 6:29
6. "Fear Not" (Montrose) - 5:16
7. "Indigo Spheres" (Montrose, Graybeal, McFarland) - 4:58
8. "Braindance " (Montrose, Graybeal, McFarland) - 5:53
9. "Specialist " (Montrose) - 4:31
10. "Walk Softly" (Montrose) - 3:28
11. "Wish in One Hand" (Montrose, Graybeal, McFarland) - 3:59

== Personnel ==
- Ronnie Montrose – guitar
- Michele Graybeal – drums and percussion
- Craig McFarland – bass

== Production ==
- Produced by Ronnie Montrose
- Engineered by Tom Carr
