= Mutatis Mutandis (album) =

Studio album by Ronnie Montrose
- Released: 1991
- Studio: The Annex Studios, Menlo Park, California
- Genre: Instrumental rock; hard rock
- Length: 41:03
- Label: I.R.S.
- Producer: Ronnie Montrose

Ronnie Montrose chronology
The Diva Station (1990)	Mutatis Mutandis (1991)	Music from Here (1994)

Mutatis Mutandis is an album of instrumental rock music by Ronnie Montrose.

== Track listing ==
All tracks written by Ronnie Montrose

1. "Mutatis Mutandis" 5:05
2. "Right Saddle/Wrong Horse" 4:22
3. "Heavy Agenda" 3:52
4. "Greed Kills" 3:54
5. "Mercury" 3:54
6. "Zero Tolerance" 4:15
7. "Velox" 3:59
8. "Company Policy" 4:01
9. "The Nomad" 3:48
10. "Tonga" 3:53

== Personnel ==
- Ronnie Montrose: guitars
- Dave Moreno: bass
- Gary Hull: synthesizers
- Steve Bellino: drums and percussion (Tracks 1 - 8)
- Don Frank: drums and percussion (Track 9)
- Vocal texturing by Michele Graybeal, Nina Markert and Kirsten Turrigian

== Production ==
- Produced by Ronnie Montrose
- Engineered by Ronnie Montrose, Roger Wiersema and Mike Hersh
