= Dee Shulman =

British writer and illustrator

- Born: 1957 (age 68–69); Johannesburg, Union of South Africa
- Education: Harrow School of Art
- Alma mater: York University
- Occupation: Novelist
- Children: 2
- Writing career
- Language: English
- Genre: Children's literature
- Notable work: Feminist Graffiti
- Website: deeshulman.com

Dee Shulman (born 1957) is a British author and illustrator of novels for children and young adults.

== Biography ==
Dee Shulman was born in Johannesburg, and studied English at York University and illustration at Harrow School of Art. Her first book, Feminist Graffiti, was published while she was studying at Harrow. After finishing art school, she worked as a storyboard artist and freelance illustrator on magazines and books. Her first children’s picture book, One Day Janie (published by Puffin) was inspired by her 2-year-old daughter. Since then, she has written and/or illustrated over 50 books for children, and has been shortlisted for the FCB award, and longlisted for the Waterstones Children’s Book Prize.

In 2008, the first Polly Price book was published – My Totally Secret Diary: On Stage in America, and was followed two years later by My Totally Secret Diary: Reality TV Nightmare. The 3rd book in the series, Polly Price’s Totally Secret Diary: Mum in Love was published in August 2012. The 4th is due for publication in 2014. Her most widely held book is Hetty and the Yeti, a children's book which, according to WorldCat, is held in 247 libraries and has been translated into Chinese, In April 2012 Fever, the first novel in her dystopian teenage series, The Parallon Trilogy, was published by Penguin. The 2nd book, Delirium, was published in May 2013, and the third, Afterlife, is due in 2014. Rights to the trilogy have been sold to Germany, Brazil, Israel, Spain, Turkey, Serbia, Poland, France, Russia and China.

== Author and illustrator bibliography ==
- One Day Janie (ISBN 978-0140540574)
- Jessie’s Special Day (ISBN 978-0140541694)
- Dora’s New Brother (ISBN 978-0099220411)
- Katie’s Special Tooth (ISBN 978-0192723017)
- Roaring Billy (ISBN 978-0099874409)
- The Visit (ISBN 978-0370315843)
- Grandad and Me (ISBN 978-0099874508)
- My Mum (ISBN 978-0006752844)
- Aunt Bella’s Cat (ISBN 978-1842990070)
- Magenta and the Ghost Babies (ISBN 978-0713659733)
- Magenta and the Ghost Bride (ISBN 978-0713659757)
- Magenta and the Ghost School (ISBN 978-0713659795)
- Magenta and the Scary Ghosts (ISBN 978-0713659771)
- Cry in the Dark (ISBN 978-0713672503)
- Hetty the Yeti (ISBN 978-0713664423)
- Polly Price’s Totally Secret Diary – On Stage in America (ISBN 978-1862304239)
- Polly Price’s Totally Secret Diary – Reality TV Nightmare (ISBN 978-1862304246)
- Polly Price’s Totally Secret Diary – Mum in Love (ISBN 978-1849415422)

== Illustrator bibliography ==
- By Chris Barton
  - Cream Cake (ISBN 978-0099132011)
- By Michaela Morgan
  - Sausage and the Little Visitor (ISBN 978-0713654721)
  - Sausage and the Spooks (ISBN 978-0713654707)
  - School for Sausage (ISBN 978-0713654745)
  - Sausage in Trouble (ISBN 978-0713654769)
  - Happy Birthday Sausage (ISBN 978-1408123973)
  - Cool Clive (ISBN 978-0199179954)
  - Cool Clive and the little Pest (ISBN 978-0199199723)
  - Cool Clive and the Bubble Trouble (ISBN 978-0199193165)
  - Cool Clive the Coolest Kid Alive (ISBN 978-0192750709)
  - Clive Keeps his Cool (ISBN 978-0199179947)
  - Yum Yuck (ISBN 978-0433032649)
  - Shelly Holmes, Ace Detective (ISBN 978-0199199754)
  - Shelley Holmes, Animal Trainer (ISBN 978-0199199976)
  - Woody’s Week (ISBN 978-0007185603)
  - Pompom (ISBN 978-1902260495)
  - Dustbin (ISBN 978-0199113453)
  - Pickles Sniffs it out (978-0713638394)
  - Invasion of the Dinner Ladies (ISBN 978-0006753216)
  - The True Diary of Carly Ann Potter (ISBN 978-0199186990)
- By Pat Thompson
  - Mary-Anne and the Cat Baby (ISBN 978-0199196128)
- By Sally Prue
  - The Path of Finn McCool (ISBN 978-0713668421)
- By Ivan Jones
  - The Lazy Giant (ISBN 978-0199151738)
- By Hiawyn Oram
  - The Good Time Boys (ISBN 978-0713646276)
- By Philip Wooderson
  - Wilf, the Black Hole and the Poisonous Marigold (ISBN 978-0713640076)
  - The Baked Bean Cure (ISBN 978-0713641905)
  - Dad’s Dodgy Lodger (ISBN 978-0713647907)
  - The Mincing Machine (ISBN 978-0140381221)
- By Kes Grey and Linda Jennings
  - Toffee and Marmalade (ISBN 978-0199152049)
  - Billy Buzoni and Friends (ISBN 978-0460880947)
  - Amazing Babies (ISBN 978-0460880305)
