= Afterlife (2014 film) =

- Directed by: Virág Zomborácz
- Written by: Virág Zomborácz
- Produced by: Ferenc Pusztai
- Cinematography: Gergely Pohárnok
- Edited by: Károly Szalai
- Music by: Ádám Balázs
- Release dates: 5 July 2014 (Karlovy Vary); 11 September 2014
- Running time: 93 minutes
- Country: Hungary
- Language: Hungarian

Afterlife (Hungarian: Utóélet) is a 2014 Hungarian comedy film directed by Virág Zomborácz, starring Márton Kristóf and László Gálffi.

== Plot ==
The film narrates the story of a young man with mental issues. He tries to help his father's ghost to cross to the otherworld.

== Production ==
Afterlife was Virág Zomborácz' first feature film. The screenplay was her graduation project from the University of Theatre and Film Arts in Budapest, and received the MEDIA European Talent Prize at the 2011 Cannes Film Festival. It received support from the Hungarian National Film Fund.

== Release ==
The film premiered at the 2014 Karlovy Vary International Film Festival. It was released in Hungary on 11 September 2014.

== Reception ==
Boyd van Hoeij of The Hollywood Reporter described Afterlife as a "tonally impressive balancing act", and wrote: "Indeed, the director's mise-en-scene, the visuals from Poharnok, Gyorgy Palfi's regular cinematographer, and the work of production designer Lilla Takacs are so atmospheric and precise that very often next to no words are needed to add humor or suggest character. What's also of vital importance in tonally complex pieces such as this one is that the actors never overplay things for laughs, as this could potentially damage the audience's attachment to the characters." Variety's Alissa Simon wrote: "The combination of whimsy and poignancy within the framework of genre calls to mind The Investigator, an earlier production by KMH Films producer Ferenc Pusztai. The chief criticism here is that Zomboracz might have gone even farther in stylizing her visuals and tying her narrative events together; in particular, the character of Mozes' mother (Krisztina Kinczli) could have been further developed."
