= Tchami =

French DJ (born 1985)

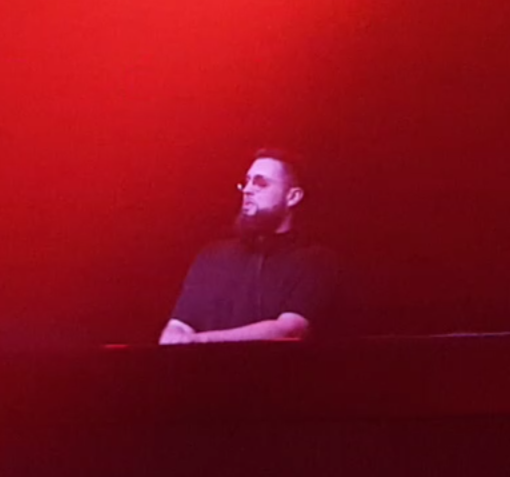
- Tchami performing at Rebel in Toronto, 2018

Background information
- Born: Martin Joseph Léonard Bresso; 12 May 1985 (age 41); Cahors, Occitanie, France
- Genres: House, future house, future bass, trap, deep house, UK garage
- Occupations: Producer, DJ
- Years active: 2013–present
- Labels: Spinnin' Records, Ministry of Sound, Fool's Gold Records, Defected Records, Confession, Owsla
- Member of: Pardon My French

Martin Joseph Léonard Bresso (French pronunciation: [maʁtɛ̃ ʒozɛf leɔnaʁ bʁeso]; born 12 May 1985), better known by his stage name Tchami (IPA: [tʃami]), is a French record producer and DJ from Paris. A founding member of the Pardon My French collective, he is best known for his solo work and regarded as a pioneer of the future house genre – a term he coined – alongside Dutch DJs Oliver Heldens and Don Diablo.

When asked about the origins of his name Tchami, he explained, "I used to travel a lot across Europe and Africa these past five years. Tchami is a name that has been given to me in Africa which is an honour. Fortunately it sounded catchy to me, so I kept it."

Tchami often performs with the persona of a priest and a church theme. He wears a clerical collar and includes visuals such as an altar and stained glass windows. In an interview he explained that "it is my message, being spiritual. I think my music is about that too".

== Musical style ==
Tchami most commonly produces music he has called future house. In an interview with Complex Media, Tchami said

I don't know what Future House is. It's whatever you create that doesn't exist before you created it. Didn't mean to confuse anybody, but a lot of people asked me how to do future house. I would like to say do what you want buddy, go outside the rules, tweak the knobs, push the green to the red and make something you love. If it doesn't sounds like everybody on the scene right now that means you won. You challenged yourself and succeed no matter if the light is on you or not, it will if you keep doing your thing. What I'm doing isn't totally new. I have a lot of inspirations. From Kashif's bass lines to Todd Edwards' [style of chopping] vocals (and many more…). At the end of the day it's not the "what" it's the "how" you do it that will make the difference. This is where your culture and your musical background is so important. This is why I made the "Stressed Out" remix. Because it's an important record in my life.

— Tchami, DAD Mix 057: Tchami

== Career ==
=== 2013–2014 ===
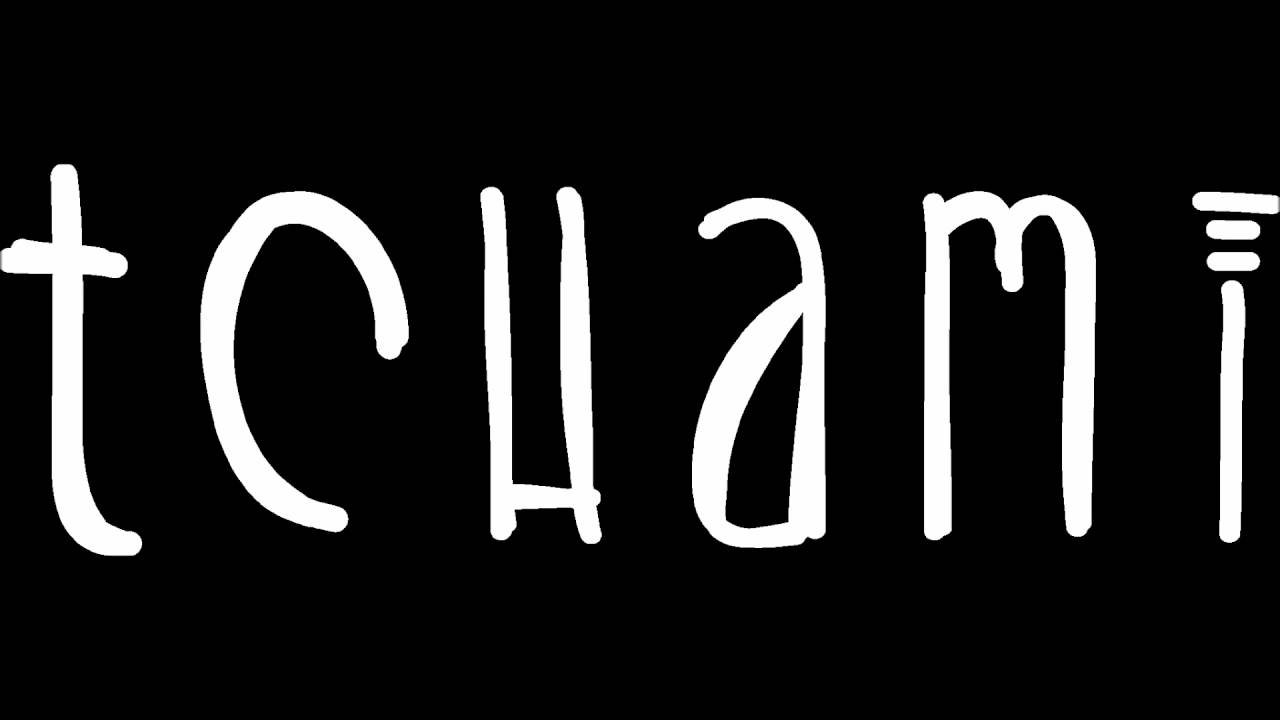
Tchami's logo

On 5 December 2013, Tchami released his first EP "Promesses" for free under the Fool's Gold Records label. Both of the EP's tracks were re-released as singles; "Shot Caller" on 17 December 2014, and "Promesses" on 4 January 2015 under Ministry of Sound, which features vocals from Kaleem Taylor. The latter peaked at number 7 on the Official Singles Chart. On 18 April 2014, Tchami released his debut single "Untrue" under the Spinnin' Records label. Tchami had co-wrote DJ Snake's and Lil Jon's hit single "Turn Down for What".

=== 2015–present ===
He launched his own record label, called Confession.

On 12 March 2015, he announced his debut extended play titled After Life. He uploaded his new song "After Life" featuring vocals from Stacy Barthe and is part of the After Life EP along with "Missing You", which has also been released by Tchami and AC Slater. In October 2015, Tchami and fellow electronic producer DJ Snake were injured in a car crash. Consequently, both artists missed a scheduled performance at Toronto's Monster Mash festival. His remix of AlunaGeorge's "You Know You Like It" was featured in the soundtrack of the 2015 movie "We Are Your Friends".

After an 8-month break following the After Life EP, Tchami released "Siaw" on his own record label Confession as a free download on 18 August 2016. The track was an experimental bass house influenced track which sampled KRS-One's Step Into A World (Rapture's Delight). He then went on to release his only single of 2016, "Prophecy", on 20 September 2016. The track was a collaboration with mysterious Parisian producer Malaa, and again featured a more experimental bass house element compared to much of Tchami's earlier work.

On 3 February 2017, Tchami released "Adieu", widely believed the 1st single of his rumoured upcoming second EP. The track was once again experimental, this time calmer than much of Tchami's earlier work. Tchami also released "World To Me" featuring London singer MNEK on Spotify, however the track was quickly made private although not taken down for unknown reasons. The track was included in his second EP, "Revelations EP", with new vocals from Luke James, alongside Adieu, Taiki Nulight collaboration "Godspell" (previously known among the dance music community unofficially as "Godspeed" and "Fallin"), "Zeal", "Adieu, Pt. ll" and a Kaelyn Behr collaboration "Don't Let Me Down". The Revelations EP was released on 25 August 2017.

His first full-length album, titled "Year Zero" was announced in the first half of 2020. Some singles from the album and other songs he released in 2020 include "Proud" featuring vocals by Daecolm, "Ghosts" featuring vocals by HANA, "Buenos Aires", "Born Again", "Faith" featuring vocals sampled from Marlena Shaw, and "Praise" featuring vocals by Gunna (rapper). In 2020, he also released a remix for Justin Martin's song "Stay" featuring vocals from Dalilah.

=== Pardon My French ===
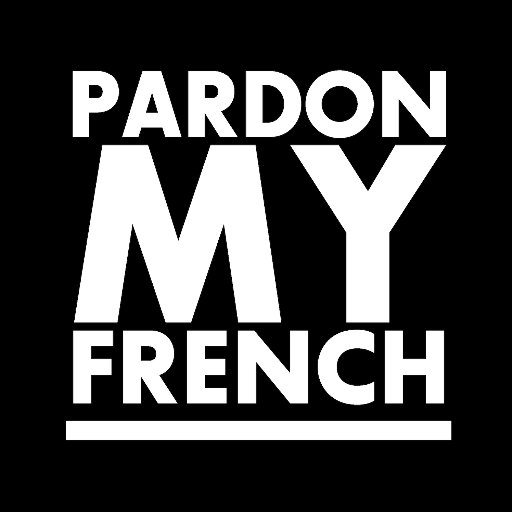
Pardon My French's logo

He is currently part of the Pardon My French team, a collective of four French DJs composed of DJ Snake, Mercer, Malaa and himself. Throughout the year 2016 and early 2017, DJ Snake did a world tour with Pardon My French Tour with Tchami and Mercer.

=== Confession ===
In 2015, Tchami announced that he would be launching a new record label called "Confession". Throughout late 2018 Tchami toured North America with other DJs signed to the Confession label for the Confession tour.

== Live performances ==
=== Something Wicked ===
- 29 October 2017 - Sam Houston Race Park Houston, TX
- 28 December 2017 - Shaw Conference Centre Edmonton, Alberta, Canada

=== Decadance 2017 ===
- 30 December 2017 - Colorado Convention Center, Denver, CO, USA

=== No Redemption Tour (Tchami and Malaa) ===
- 10 November 2017 - World Market Center Las Vegas, NV, USA
- 11 November 2017 - Shrine Expo Hall Los Angeles, CA, USA
- 17 November 2017 - Electric Factory Philadelphia, PA, USA
- 18 November 2017 - The Tabernacle Atlanta, GA, USA
- 22 November 2017 - City National Civic San Jose, CA, USA
- 24 November 2017 - Rebel Toronto, Canada
- 25 November 2017 - New City Gas Montreal, Canada
- 1 December 2017 - Brooklyn Hangar Brooklyn, NY, USA
- 2 December 2017 - Echostage Washington, DC, USA
- 8 December 2017 - The Fillmore Miami, FL, USA
- 9 December 2017 - Aragon Ballroom Chicago, IL, USA

=== CRSSD Festival ===
- 4 March 2018 - Waterfront Park, San Diego, CA, USA

=== EDC Mexico 2018 ===
- 24 February 2018 - Autódromo Hermanos Rodríguez, Mexico City, Mexico

=== Tchami x Malaa ===
- 24 March 2018 - Ultra Music Festival, Miami, FL, USA
- 4 May 2018 - Bill Graham Civic Auditorium, San Francisco, CA, USA
- 11 May 2018 - Red Rocks Amphitheatre, Morrison, CO, USA
- 21 July 2018 - Parookaville, Weeze, Germany
- 30 December 2018 - Rhythm & Vines, Gisborne, New Zealand
- 3 July 2019 - Balaton Sound, Zamárdi, Hungary
- 7 July 2019 - Electric Love, Salzburg, Austria
- 20 July 2019 - Parookaville, Weeze, Germany
- 21 July 2019 - Sunrise Festival, Kołobrzeg, Poland
- 26 July 2019 - Tomorrowland, Boom, Belgium
- 25 August 2019 - Mysteryland, Haarlemmermeer, Netherlands
- 30 December 2019 - SnowGlobe Festival, Lake Tahoe, CA, USA
- 31 December 2019 - Resolution Festival NYE, WaMu Theater, Seattle, WA, USA

=== Coachella Valley Music and Arts Festival ===
- 16 & 23 April 2016 - Indio, California, USA
- 11 & 18 April 2020 - Indio, California, USA (Postponed / Cancelled)
- April 2022 - Indio, California, USA

=== Ultra Music Festival ===
- 24 March 2017 Mainstage Miami, FL, USA
- 24 March 2018 Live Stage Miami, FL, USA
- 30 March 2019 Mainstage Miami, FL, USA
- 26 March 2023 Mainstage Miami, FL, USA

=== The Calling ===
- 13 April 2023 - Fourth Presbyterian Church Chicago, IL, USA
- 11 April 2024 - Angel Orensanz Foundation New York, NY, USA
- 12 April 2024 - Theatre Paradoxe Montreal, Canada
- 13 April 2024 - Masonic Cathedral Theatre, Detroit, MI, USA

== DJ Mag Top 100 DJs ==
Year	Peak position	Notes	Ref.
2014	118	Out	
2015	62	Up 56	
2016	109	Exit (Down 47)	
2017	95	Re Entry (Up 14)	
2018	82	Up 13	
2019	120	Exit (Down 38)	
2020	145	Down 25	
