= Promesses =

Single by Tchami featuring Kaleem Taylor
- Released: 24 July 2013 (original mix) 5 January 2015 (radio edit)
- Recorded: 2013
- Genre: Future house
- Length: 4:46 (original mix) 2:39 (radio edit)
- Label: Fool's Gold Records (2013) Ministry of Sound (2015)
- Songwriters: Martin Bresso; Kaleem Taylor; William Grigahcine
- Producers: Tchami; DJ Snake

Tchami singles chronology
"Promesses" (2013)	"Shot Caller" (2013)

"Promesses" is a song by the French producer/DJ Tchami featuring guest vocals by a British singer, Kaleem Taylor. It was initially released on 24 July 2013 by Fool's Gold Records as part of his free EP Promesses with "Shot Caller". A radio edit of the song was then re-released on 5 January 2015 as a digital download in the United Kingdom by Ministry of Sound. The song was written by Tchami, Taylor and DJ Snake, the latter also co-producing it. The song peaked at number 7 on the UK Singles Chart and topped the UK Indie Chart.

== Music video ==
A music video to accompany the release of "Promesses" was first released onto YouTube on 11 December 2014 at a total length of two minutes and forty seconds.

== Track listing ==
Digital download – single
No.	Title	Length
1.	"Promesses" (featuring Kaleem Taylor) (Radio Edit)	2:39

Digital download – EP
No.	Title	Length
1.	"Promesses" (Preditah Remix)	4:00
2.	"Promesses" (Calyx & TeeBee Remix)	4:11
3.	"Promesses" (Pep & Rash Remix)	4:28
4.	"Promesses" (Extended Mix)	4:12

== Charts ==
Chart (2015)	Peak position
Belgium (Ultratip Bubbling Under Flanders)	7
Belgium (Ultratip Bubbling Under Wallonia)	41
Scotland Singles (OCC)	9
UK Singles (OCC)	7
UK Dance (OCC)	2
UK Indie (OCC)	1

== Certifications ==
Region	Certification	Certified units/sales
United Kingdom (BPI)	Gold	400,000^{‡}
^{‡} Sales+streaming figures based on certification alone.

== Release history ==
Region	Date	Format	Label
Ireland	2 January 2015	digital download	Ministry of Sound
United Kingdom	4 January 2015	digital download	Ministry of Sound
