= The Afterlife =

Single by Paul Simon

from the album So Beautiful or So What
- Released: February 25, 2011
- Recorded: 2010
- Genre: Folk rock, afropop
- Length: 3:39
- Label: Hear Music
- Songwriter: Paul Simon
- Producers: Phil Ramone, Paul Simon

Paul Simon singles chronology
"Getting Ready for Christmas Day" (2010)	"The Afterlife" (2011)	"'Wristband" (2016)

"The Afterlife" is a song by American singer-songwriter Paul Simon from his twelfth studio album, So Beautiful or So What (2011). The song humorously describes a recently deceased individual standing in line to meet with his heavenly creator in Heaven.

The song peaked at number four on Billboard's Adult Alternative Songs chart.

== Background ==
The song concerns a man dying and getting to heaven, where he waits in line to meet with God, where everyone is "filling out forms and waiting in line to catch 'a glimpse of the divine.'" While in line, he unsuccessfully hits on a woman. When he finally meets God, he is taken aback, and can only spout gibberish.

== Reception ==
Will Hermes of Rolling Stone gave the song four stars, commenting, "Packed with internal rhymes, Simon's verses flow like butter over supple lines by Cameroonian guitar master Vincent Nguini and Jim Oblon's syncopated grooves." Margaret Wappler of the Los Angeles Times praised the song as memorable, commending its "zydeco-inflected shuffle" and remarking, "According to Paul Simon, the afterlife is a bureaucratic bummer as bad as the DMV."

== Track listing ==
All tracks are written by Paul Simon.

Digital download
No.	Title	Length
1.	"The Afterlife"	3:39

== Chart positions ==
=== Weekly charts ===
Chart (2011)	Peak position
US Adult Alternative Songs (Billboard)	4
US Hot Rock & Alternative Songs (Billboard)	50
