= Heroes in Time =

Studio album by Metalite
- Released: 27 October 2017
- Genre: Symphonic power metal
- Length: 47:56
- Label: Inner Wound
- Producers: Edwin Premberg, Jacob Hansen

Metalite chronology
Heroes in Time (2017)	Biomechanicals (2019)

Professional ratings
Review scores
Source	Rating
Powermetal.de	4/10
Rock Hard	5/10
Soundscape Magazine	9/10

Heroes in Time is the debut studio album by Swedish power metal band Metalite, released on 27 October 2017. It was produced by Jacob Hansen, known for his production work with Volbeat, Evergrey, and Amaranthe. It is their only album with vocalist Emma Bensing who was replaced by Erica Ohlsson on all subsequent albums.

== Track listing ==
All tracks are written by Edwin Premberg.

No.	Title	Length
1.	"Afterlife"	4:09
2.	"Purpose of Life"	4:22
3.	"Nightmare"	4:13
4.	"The Hunter"	4:22
5.	"Heroes in Time"	3:45
6.	"Power of Metal"	4:37
7.	"Over and Done"	3:45
8.	"The Light of Orion"	5:06
9.	"In the Middle of the Night"	4:13
10.	"Black Horse Rider"	4:43
11.	"The Great Force Within Us"	4:41
Total length:		47:56

Japanese edition bonus track
No.	Title	Length
12.	"In the Middle of the Night (piano version)"	3:34
Total length:		51:30

== Personnel ==
- Emma Bensing – vocals
- Robert Örnesved – guitars
- Edwin Premberg – guitars, keyboards, additional vocals, production
- Robert Majd – bass
- Lea Larsson – drums
