= The Sweet Hereafter =

The Sweet Hereafter may refer to:

- The Sweet Hereafter (novel), a 1991 novel by Russell Banks
- The Sweet Hereafter (film), a 1997 Canadian film written and directed by Atom Egoyan, an adaptation of the novel
- The Sweet Hereafter (soundtrack), 1997 music album to the film
- "The Sweet Hereafter", a 1998 episode of British TV series 2point4 Children
- "Chapter Thirteen: The Sweet Hereafter", an episode of the 2017 American television series Riverdale
- Sweet Hereafter (bar), a bar and restaurant in Portland, Oregon
