= Afterlife (comics) =

OEL manga

- Cover of Afterlife vol. 1 (2006), art by Rob Steen
- Genre: Horror
- Author: Stormcrow Hayes
- Illustrator: Rob Steen
- Publisher: (United States) Tokyopop
- Original run: 2006
- Volumes: 3

Afterlife is an original English-language manga published by Tokyopop and created by Stormcrow Hayes (writer) and Rob Steen (illustrator). The comic is out of print as of August 31, 2009.

== Synopsis ==
The three volume series gives a dark alternate view of where everyone goes when they die. It's a bleak, bland seemingly pointless place protected by Guardians who fend off demons. Thaddeus, one of the guardians, though philosophical, is resigned to his fate until he meets Nyoko who convinces him to look for the mythical gate which could lead to... the afterlife of the afterlife?

== Characters ==
- Thaddeus Alexandros: A philosopher struggling to find meaning in a meaningless world, Thaddeus refuses to think about his former life, instead focusing on his duties as a Guardian. However, even his duties are called into question, and he's forced to choose between duty and his yearning for answers.
- Mercutio: If Thaddeus is philosophical about the world in which they exist, Mercutio is the opposite, a pragmatist. His only concern is to find his lost love, Arrabella. But there is a dark secret in her past that he has yet to learn.
- Nyoko: Having died young, robbed of her full lifetime, she is willing to do anything to escape the nightmarish existence of the afterlife. She finds hope in Thaddeus' journal and insists they work together to find the mythical, long-rumored and possibly non-existent gateway to another world.

== Accolades ==
IGN.com listed the book as one of the top 10 manga of 2006.

The book won a YALSA (Young Adult Library Services Association) award.
