= Norman Parker (author) =

British writer (1944–2019)

Norman Parker (1944–2019) was a British author and convicted murderer. He attended St Clement Danes Grammar School in West London. After serving a six-year sentence for manslaughter, he was convicted of murder in 1970 and sentenced to life imprisonment. He served 24 years in prisons including Parkhurst. His involvement in riots, hunger strikes and escapes saw him moved from prison to prison, often spending long periods in solitary confinement.

In the later years of his sentence, Parker gained an honours degree from the Open University and began writing about his prison experiences. On release, his first book Parkhurst Tales, was published, a memoir of his time in Parkhurst and other prisons, and his fellow convicts including the Kray twins and "Mad" Frankie Fraser. He has since written several more books including, "Life After Life" published in 2006 and has made regular appearances in the media, commenting on criminal justice issues. He appeared in the Sky TV Documentary 'Mad Frank' Directed by Liam Galvin. In 2003 Parker gained a master's degree in criminology from the University of Surrey.
