= After Death =

After Death may refer to:

- After Death (1989 film), an Italian horror film
- After Death (1915 film), a Russian short film
- After Death (2023 film), a faith-based documentary
- AfterDeath, a 2015 British horror film

== See also ==
- Afterlife (disambiguation)
- Life after death (disambiguation)
- Anno Domini (AD), a Latin phrase indicating years after the estimated birth of Jesus, often mistaken to mean "after death"
- Acharei Mot (Hebrew: after [the] death), the 29th weekly Torah portion in the annual Jewish cycle of Torah reading
- Resurrection of the dead
