= Simon & Garfunkel discography =

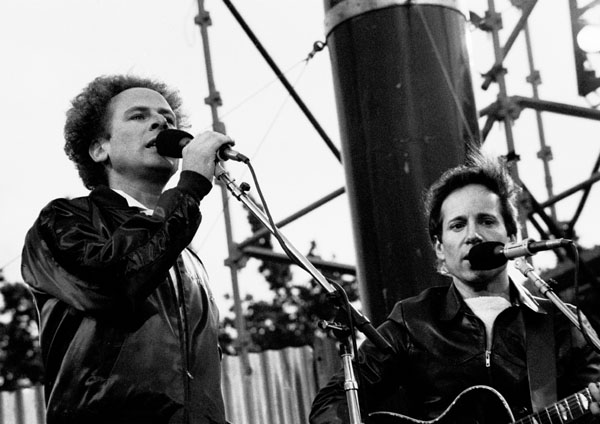
- Simon & Garfunkel performing at an outdoor concert in Dublin
- Studio albums: 5
- Extended plays: 1
- Soundtrack albums: 1
- Live albums: 4
- Compilation albums: 13
- Singles: 26
- Video albums: 2
- Box sets: 5

Simon & Garfunkel were an American singer-songwriter duo that have released five studio albums, thirteen compilation albums, four live albums, one extended play, twenty-six singles, one soundtrack and five box sets since 1964. Paul Simon and Art Garfunkel first formed a duo in 1957 as Tom & Jerry, before separating and later reforming as Simon & Garfunkel.

Simon & Garfunkel's debut album, Wednesday Morning, 3 A.M., was released on October 19, 1964. Initially a flop, it was re-released two years later with the new version of the single "The Sound of Silence", which was overdubbed with electric instruments and drums by producer Tom Wilson. The re-released version peaked at number thirty in the US Billboard 200 chart and at twenty-four in the UK Albums Chart, and later received a platinum certification by the Recording Industry Association of America (RIAA). The overdubbed version of the eponymous single was released on their second studio album, Sounds of Silence, released on January 17, 1966. It peaked at twenty-one on the Billboard charts and at thirty in the UK Album Charts, and later received a three-times multi-platinum certification by the RIAA. Besides the same-named single, the album also featured Simon's "I Am a Rock", a song that first appeared on his 1965 debut solo album, The Paul Simon Songbook.

Simon & Garfunkel's third album, Parsley, Sage, Rosemary and Thyme, was released on October 10, 1966, and produced five singles. It peaked at number four in the US and number thirteen in the UK, and received a three-time multi-platinum certification by RIAA. The single "Mrs. Robinson" was included in the duo's first and only soundtrack, The Graduate, and was later included on their fourth studio album Bookends, which was released on April 3, 1968. It peaked at number one in both the US and UK, therefore becoming their first number one album, and received two-times multi-platinum in the US. On January 26, 1970, they released their fifth and final studio album, Bridge over Troubled Water. It was their most successful to date, peaking at number one in several countries, including the UK and US. The album sold over twenty-five million copies worldwide, and received eight-time multi-platinum in the US.

Despite the success of their fifth album, the duo Simon & Garfunkel decided to part ways, announcing their break-up later that year. They have nonetheless made a number of reunion performances, including a free concert in New York City's Central Park in 1981, which drew a crowd of half-a-million people and resulted in the live album The Concert in Central Park.

== Albums ==
=== Studio albums ===
List of studio albums, with selected chart positions
Title	Album details	Peak chart positions										Certifications
Title	Album details	US	AUS	FIN	FRA	GER	JPN	NLD	NOR	SWE	UK	Certifications
Wednesday Morning, 3 A.M.	Released: October 19, 1964; Label: Columbia; Format: LP	30	—	—	—	—	—	—	—	—	24	RIAA: Platinum; BPI: Silver
Sounds of Silence	Released: January 17, 1966; Label: Columbia; Format: LP	21	—	—	—	—	—	—	—	—	13	RIAA: 3× Platinum; BPI: Gold
Parsley, Sage, Rosemary and Thyme	Released: October 10, 1966; Label: Columbia; Format: LP	4	14	—	—	—	—	—	—	—	13^{[B]}	RIAA: 3× Platinum; BPI: Silver
Bookends	Released: April 3, 1968; Label: Columbia; Format: LP	1	3	—	3	40	—	—	—	—	1	RIAA: 2× Platinum; BPI: Gold
Bridge over Troubled Water	Released: January 26, 1970; Label: Columbia; Format: LP	1	1	1	1	1	1	1	1	1	1	RIAA: 8× Platinum; BPI: 11× Platinum; BVMI: Platinum; IFPI FIN: Gold; SNEP: Platinum
"—" denotes a recording that did not chart or was not released in that territory.

Notes

- A In Japan, these albums entered the chart for the first time with the 2003 reissue.
- B the re-release of Parsley, Sage, Rosemary and Thyme on August 31, 1968, in the UK.

=== Live albums ===
List of live albums, with selected chart positions
Title	Album details	Peak chart positions										Certifications
Title	Album details	US	AUS	FRA	GER	JPN	NLD	NZ	NOR	SWE	UK	Certifications
The Concert in Central Park	Released: February 16, 1982; Recorded: September 19, 1981; Label: Warner Bros.; Format: CD, CS, LP	6	5	1	3	2	1	1	1	5	6	RIAA: 2× Platinum; ARIA: Platinum; BPI: Gold; BVMI: Gold; NVPI: Gold; SNEP: Diamond
Live from New York City, 1967	Released: 16 July 2002; Recorded: January 22, 1967; Label: Columbia; Format: CD	165	—	148	—	—	—	—	—	—	—	
Old Friends: Live on Stage	Released: December 7, 2004; Recorded: December 2, 2003; Label: Warner Bros.; Format: CD	154	22	165	35	195	—	—	—	—	61	ARIA: Gold; BPI: Gold
Live 1969	Released: 25 March 2008; Recorded: October 30 – November 27, 1969; Label: Columbia; Format: CD	33	—	—	—	43	—	—	—	—	—	
"—" denotes a recording that did not chart or was not released in that territory.

=== Soundtracks ===
List of soundtrack albums, with selected chart positions
Title	Album details	Peak chart positions					Certifications
Title	Album details	US	AUS	FRA	NOR	UK	Certifications
The Graduate	Released: January 21, 1968; Label: Columbia; Format: LP, CD	1	1	3	2	3	RIAA: 2× Platinum; BPI: Silver

=== Compilation albums ===
List of compilation albums, with selected chart positions
Title	Album details	Peak chart positions											Certifications
Title	Album details	US	AUS	FIN	FRA	GER	JPN	NLD	NZ	NOR	SWE	UK	Certifications
The Hit Sounds of Simon and Garfunkel	Released: 1966; Label: Pickwick; Format: LP	—	—	—	—	—	—	—	—	—	—	—	
Simon and Garfunkel's Greatest Hits	Released: June 14, 1972; Label: Columbia; Format: LP	5	10	4	16	6	3	1	22	7	4	2	RIAA: Diamond (14× Platinum); BPI: 4× Platinum; BVMI: 2× Platinum; IFPI FIN: Gold; SNEP: Diamond
The Simon and Garfunkel Collection	Released: 1981; Label: Columbia; Format: LP, CD, cassette	—	3	1	6	2	23	4	1	—	49	4	ARIA: 3× Platinum; BPI: 3× Platinum; BVMI: Gold; IFPI FIN: Platinum; NVPI: 2× Platinum; SNEP: 2× Platinum
20 Greatest Hits	Released: August 3, 1991; Label: Sony; Format: CD	—	21	—	—	—	58	—	1	—	—	—	ARIA: Gold
The Definitive Simon & Garfunkel	Released: 1991; Label: Sony; Format: CD	—	5	8	2	12	13	35	12	1	3	8	ARIA: Platinum; BPI: Platinum; BVMI: Gold; GLF: Gold; IFPI FIN: Gold; IFPI NOR: 2× Platinum; NVPI: Gold; RIAJ: 2× Platinum; SNEP: Diamond
The Best of Simon & Garfunkel	Released: 1999; Label: Columbia/Legacy; Format: CD, CS	43	66	—	—	—	—	16	—	—	—	145	RIAA: Platinum; BPI: Silver; RIAJ: 2× Gold
Two Can Dream Alone	Released: 2000; Label: Burning Airlines; Format: CD	—	—	—	—	—	—	—	—	—	—	—	
Tales from New York: The Very Best of Simon & Garfunkel	Released: March 28, 2000; Label: Sony/Columbia; Format: CD	—	15	25	—	—	—	—	5	—	1	8	ARIA: Gold; BPI: Gold; GLF: Gold; RMNZ: 3× Platinum
Tom & Jerry	Released: 2002; Label: Superior; Format: CD	—	—	—	—	—	—	—	—	—	—	—	
The Essential Simon & Garfunkel	Released: October 14, 2003; Label: Columbia/Legacy; Format: CD	27	20	1	33	24	104	64	38	1	4	25	RIAA: Platinum; ARIA: 2×Platinum; BPI: Platinum; BVMI: Gold; GLF: Gold; IFPI FIN: Gold; IFPI NOR: Platinum
Before the Fame	Released: November 18, 2003; Label: Alchemy; Format: CD	—	—	—	—	—	—	—	—	—	—	—	
Paul Simon & Art Garfunkel	Released: August 1, 2006; Label: Delta Distribution; Format: CD	—	—	—	—	—	—	—	—	—	—	—	
America: The Simon and Garfunkel Collection	Released: June 2, 2008; Label: Sony BMG; Format: CD	—	—	—	—	—	—	—	—	—	—	–	
"—" denotes a recording that did not chart or was not released in that territory.

=== Box sets ===
List of box sets, with selected chart positions
Title	Album details	Peak chart positions						Certifications
Title	Album details	AUS	FIN	NLD	NOR	SWE	UK	Certifications
Collected Works	Released: 1981; Label: Tee Vee/CBS/Columbia; Format: LP, CD	—	—	—	—	—	—	RIAA: Platinum
Old Friends	Released: November 4, 1997; Label: Columbia/Sony Legacy; Format: CD	68	—	—	—	—	170	RIAA: Gold; BPI: Gold
The Columbia Studio Recordings (1964–1970)	Released: August 21, 2001; Label: Columbia/Legacy; Format: CD	—	43	—	—	—	—	
The Collection: Simon & Garfunkel	Released: November 26, 2007; Label: Columbia/Legacy; Format: CD	—	22	65	25	16	29	BPI: Gold
Simon & Garfunkel: The Complete Albums Collection	Released: November 24, 2014; Label: Columbia/Legacy; Format: CD	—	—	—	—	—	—	
"—" denotes a recording that did not chart or was not released in that territory.

=== Video albums ===
List of video albums
Title	Album details	Certifications	Notes
The Concert in Central Park	Released: February 21, 1982 (Broadcast); 1982 (Laserdisc, CED, VHS); 1992 (Laserdisc, VHS); 2003 (US DVD); 2004 (Europe DVD)	RIAA: Gold; ARIA: 10× Platinum; BPI: Platinum	Reunion concert HBO TV special
Old Friends: Live on Stage	Released: December 7, 2004 (DVD, CD/DVD)	RIAA: Gold; ARIA: 2× Platinum	"Old Friends" reunion concert tour filmed at Madison Square Garden in 2003

== Singles and EPs ==
List of singles, with selected chart positions
Titles (A-side, B-side) Both sides from same album except where indicated	Year	Peak chart positions											Certifications	Album
Titles (A-side, B-side) Both sides from same album except where indicated	Year	US	US AC	AUS	AUT	CAN CHUM RPM	GER	NLD	NZL	NOR	SWE	UK	Certifications	Album
"Hey, Schoolgirl"^{[C]} b/w "Dancin' Wild"	1957	49	—	—	—	45	—	—	—	—	—	—		Non-album tracks (released as "Tom & Jerry")
"Our Song"^{[C]} b/w "Two Teen-agers"	1958	—	—	—	—	—	—	—	—	—	—	—		Non-album tracks (released as "Tom & Jerry")
"That's My Story"^{[C]} b/w "(Pretty Baby) Don't Say Goodbye"	1958	—	—	—	—	—	—	—	—	—	—	—		Non-album tracks (released as "Tom & Jerry")
"The Sound of Silence" b/w "We've Got a Groovy Thing Goin'"	1965	1	—	3	3	4	9	11	2	—	—	—	RIAA: Gold; BPI: Platinum; RMNZ: 2× Platinum	Sounds of Silence
"Homeward Bound" b/w "Leaves That Are Green" (from Sounds of Silence)	1966	5	—	20	—	2	—	4	1	—	12	9	BPI: Silver; RMNZ: Gold	Sounds of Silence (UK); Parsley, Sage, Rosemary and Thyme (US)
"That's My Story" (1966 re-release)^{[E]} b/w "(Uncle Simon's) Tiajuana Blues"	1966	—^{[C]}	—	—	—	—	95	—	—	—	—	—		Non-album tracks
"I Am a Rock" b/w "Flowers Never Bend with the Rainfall" (from Parsley, Sage, Rosemary and Thyme)	1966	3	—	20	—	6	35	10	2	—	10	17		Sounds of Silence
"The Dangling Conversation" b/w "The Big Bright Green Pleasure Machine"	1966	25	—	85	—	27	—	—	—	—	—	51^{[D]}		Parsley, Sage, Rosemary and Thyme
"A Hazy Shade of Winter" b/w "For Emily, Whenever I May Find Her" (from Parsley, Sage, Rosemary and Thyme)	1966	13	—	—	—	11	—	—	14	—	—	—		Bookends
"At the Zoo" b/w "The 59th Street Bridge Song (Feelin' Groovy)" (from Parsley, Sage, Rosemary and Thyme)	1967	16	—	—	—	11	—	—	—	—	—	53^{[D]}		Bookends
"Fakin' It" b/w "You Don't Know Where Your Interest Lies" (non-album track)	1967	23	—	—	—	8	—	—	—	—	—	—		Bookends
"Scarborough Fair/Canticle" b/w "April Come She Will" (from Sounds of Silence)	1968	11	5	49	—	5	—	—	—	—	—	—	BPI: Silver	Parsley, Sage, Rosemary & Thyme
"Mrs. Robinson" b/w "Old Friends/Bookends"	1968	1	4	8	—	1	39	5	9	8	13	4	RIAA: Gold; BPI: Platinum; RMNZ: 2× Platinum	Bookends
"Mrs. Robinson EP" "Mrs. Robinson", "April Come She Will", "Scarborough Fair/Canticle", "The Sound of Silence"	1968	—	—	—	—	—	—	—	—	—	—	9		—N/a
"The Sound of Silence" (Australian 1969 re-release)	1969	—	—	23	—	—	—	—	—	—	—	—		Sounds of Silence
"The Boxer" b/w "Baby Driver"	1969	7	3	8	9	3	19	2	9	9	5	6	BPI: Gold; RMNZ: Platinum	Bridge over Troubled Water
"Bridge over Troubled Water" b/w "Keep the Customer Satisfied"	1970	1	1	2	4	1	3	5	1	7	—	1	RIAA: Gold; BPI: Platinum; RMNZ: Platinum	Bridge over Troubled Water
"Cecilia" b/w "The Only Living Boy in New York"	1970	4	—	6	6	2	2	1	—	—	—	51^{[D]}	RIAA: Gold; BPI: Gold; BPI: Silver (b/w); RMNZ: 2× Platinum; RMNZ: Gold (b/w)	Bridge over Troubled Water
"El Condor Pasa (If I Could)" b/w "Why Don't You Write Me"	1970	18	6	1	1	4	1	1	14	—	—	—	BPI: Silver	Bridge over Troubled Water
"Seven O'Clock News/Silent Night" (Netherlands 1970 re-release) b/w "Go Tell It on the Mountain" (from Wednesday Morning, 3 a.m.)	1970	—	—	—	—	—	—	—	—	—	—	—		Parsley, Sage, Rosemary and Thyme
"The 59th Street Bridge Song (Feelin' Groovy)" (A-side re-release) b/w "I Am a Rock" (from Sounds of Silence)	1971	—	—	—	—	—	—	—	—	—	—	—		Parsley, Sage, Rosemary and Thyme
"For Emily, Whenever I May Find Her" (live) b/w "America" (single mix)	1972	53	27	—	—	65	—	—	—	—	—	—		Simon and Garfunkel's Greatest Hits
"America" (single mix) (A-side re-release) b/w "For Emily, Whenever I May Find Her" (live)	1972	97	—	—	—	—	—	—	—	—	—	25	BPI: Silver; RMNZ: Gold	Simon and Garfunkel's Greatest Hits
"My Little Town" b/w "Rag Doll" (by Art Garfunkel), "You're Kind" (by Paul Simon)	1975	9	1	46	—	9	—	17	24	—	—	56^{[D]}		Still Crazy After All These Years/Breakaway
"Wonderful World" ^{[F]}	1978	17	1	—	—	13	—	—	—	—	—	—		Watermark
"Wake Up Little Susie" b/w "Me and Julio Down by the Schoolyard"	1982	27	5	—	—	—	—	—	—	—	—	—		The Concert in Central Park
"Mrs. Robinson" (live)	1982	—	—	—	—	—	—	— (Note: "Mrs. Robinson" did not chart on the Dutch Single Top 100, but spent a week on the Single Tip chart.)	—	—	—	—		The Concert in Central Park
"A Hazy Shade of Winter" (UK 1991 re-release) b/w "7 O'Clock News/Silent Night" (CD single also included "Bridge over Troubled Water")	1991	—	—	—	—	—	—	—	—	—	—	30		The Definitive Simon & Garfunkel
"The Boxer" (UK 1992 re-release) b/w "Cecilia" CD single also included "The Only Living Boy in New York" (from Bridge over Troubled Water)	1992	—	—	—	—	—	—	—	—	—	—	75		The Definitive Simon & Garfunkel
"Live at Carnegie Hall 1969" EP (online-only release) Four tracks (The Boxer, So Long, Frank Lloyd Wright, Song for the asking and Bridge over Troubled Water) recorded at Carnegie Hall on 27-28 November 1969.	2020	—	—	—	—	—	—	—	—	—	—	—		Non-album tracks
"—" denotes a recording that did not chart or was not released in that territory.

Notes

- C as Tom & Jerry.
- D Chart position is from the official UK "Breakers List".
- E Originally released as Tom & Jerry (BIG 618 & HUNT 319). Re-released by ABC Paramount under the name Simon & Garfunkel in 1966.
- F Credited to Art Garfunkel with James Taylor & Paul Simon

== Other appearances ==
=== Studio ===
List of studio appearances
Title	Year	Album
"The Star Carol"	1967	A Very Merry Christmas

=== Live ===
List of live appearances
Title	Year	Album
"America" (live version)	1997	The Bridge School Concerts Vol.1
"The Sound of Silence" (live version) "Mrs. Robinson" (live version) "The Boxer" (live version) "Bridge over Troubled Water" (live version)	2010	The 25th Anniversary Rock & Roll Hall of Fame Concerts

== See also ==
- Paul Simon discography
- Art Garfunkel discography
