= List of songs recorded by Simon & Garfunkel =

Songs by American folk duo

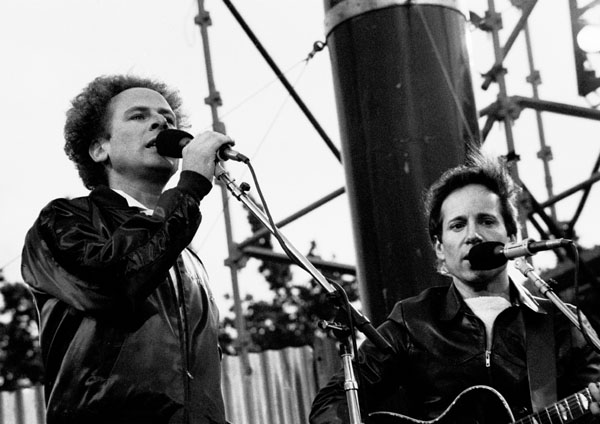
Simon & Garfunkel performing in Dublin, 1982

American folk rock duo Simon & Garfunkel recorded songs for five studio albums. Consisting of guitarist/singer-songwriter Paul Simon and singer Art Garfunkel, the duo first met as children in Forest Hills, Queens, New York in 1953, where they first learned to harmonize with one another and began writing original material.

By 1957, the teenagers had their first minor success with "Hey Schoolgirl", a song imitating their idols the Everly Brothers. In 1963, they regrouped and were signed to Columbia Records. Their debut, Wednesday Morning, 3 A.M., sold poorly, and they once again disbanded.

A remix of their song "The Sound of Silence" gained airplay on U.S. radio in 1965, hitting number one on the Billboard Hot 100. Simon & Garfunkel reunited, releasing their second studio album, Sounds of Silence, and touring colleges nationwide. Their third release, Parsley, Sage, Rosemary and Thyme (1966), found the duo assuming more creative control.

Their music was featured in the 1967 film The Graduate, propelling the duo to further exposure. Bookends (1968), their next album, benefited from this promotion, and increased their profile. Their often rocky relationship led to artistic disagreements, resulting in their 1970 breakup. Their final studio record, Bridge over Troubled Water, was subsequently their most successful, becoming one of the world's best-selling albums.

This list comprises their core studio work, including their songs under the name Tom and Jerry. The duo's multiple live albums contain cover songs as well as music from their respective solo careers; only said cover songs are listed here. In all, Simon & Garfunkel recorded and released 75 songs, including nineteen songs as Tom and Jerry.

== Songs ==
Key
†	Indicates single release

Title	Year	Album / Single	Length	Notes	Ref.
"America" †	1968	Bookends	2:11		
"Anna Belle"	1959	"Anna Belle"	1:58	Tom and Jerry recording	
"Anji"	1966	Sounds of Silence	2:15		
"April Come She Will"	1966	Sounds of Silence	1:49	First recorded for The Paul Simon Songbook (1965)	
"At the Zoo" †	1968	Bookends	2:23		
"Baby Driver"	1970	Bridge over Troubled Water	3:15		
"Baby Talk"	1960	"Baby Talk / I'm Gonna Get Married"	2:05	Tom and Jerry recording	
"Barbriallen"	1966	Sounds of Silence	4:02	Demo released on 2001 compact disc remaster	
"Benedictus"	1964	Wednesday Morning, 3 A.M.	2:38		
"The Big Bright Green Pleasure Machine"	1966	Parsley, Sage, Rosemary and Thyme	2:47		
"Hey Schoolgirl/Black Slacks"	1997	Old Friends	1:32	Previously unissued live recording	
"Bleecker Street"	1964	Wednesday Morning, 3 A.M.	2:44		
"Blessed"	1966	Sounds of Silence	3:14		
"Blues Run the Game"	1966	Sounds of Silence	2:51		
"Bookends"	1968	Bookends	0:32; 1:20		
"The Boxer" †	1970	Bridge over Troubled Water	5:08		
"Bridge over Troubled Water" †	1970	Bridge over Troubled Water	4:52		
"Bye Bye Love" (The Everly Brothers cover)	1970	Bridge over Troubled Water	2:53		
"Cecilia" †	1970	Bridge over Troubled Water	2:55		
"A Church Is Burning"	2002	Live from New York City, 1967	3:43	Live version. First recorded for The Paul Simon Songbook (1965)	
"Citizen of the Planet"	2004	Old Friends: Live on Stage	3:14		
"Cloudy"	1966	Parsley, Sage, Rosemary and Thyme	2:21		
"Comfort and Joy"	1997	Old Friends	1:49	An a cappella arrangement of "God Rest Ye Merry Gentlemen", previously unissued	
"Cuba Si, Nixon No"	1970	Bridge over Troubled Water	3:19	Unreleased	
"Dancin' Wild"	1957	"Hey, Schoolgirl"	2:17	Tom and Jerry recording	
"The Dangling Conversation" †	1966	Parsley, Sage, Rosemary and Thyme	2:37		
"El Condor Pasa (If I Could)"	1970	Bridge over Troubled Water	3:06		
"Fakin' It"	1968	Bookends	3:17		
"Feuilles-O"	1970	Bridge over Troubled Water	1:42	Demo released on 2001 compact disc remaster	
"Fighting Mad"	1962	"Surrender, Please Surrender"	2:06	Tom and Jerry recording	
"The 59th Street Bridge Song (Feelin' Groovy)"	1966	Parsley, Sage, Rosemary and Thyme	1:53		
"Flowers Never Bend with the Rainfall"	1966	Parsley, Sage, Rosemary and Thyme	2:10	First recorded for The Paul Simon Songbook (1965)	
"For Emily, Whenever I May Find Her"	1966	Parsley, Sage, Rosemary and Thyme	2:05		
"The French Twist"	1962	"I'll Drown in My Tears"	2:05	Tom and Jerry recording	
"Go Tell It on the Mountain"	1964	Wednesday Morning, 3 A.M.	2:05		
"Groundhog"	1968	Bookends	2:46	Unreleased	
"A Hazy Shade of Winter" †	1966	Bookends	2:17		
"He Was My Brother"	1964	Wednesday Morning, 3 A.M.	2:49		
"Hey, Schoolgirl" †	1957	"Hey, Schoolgirl"	2:15	Tom and Jerry recording	
"Homeward Bound" †	1966	Parsley, Sage, Rosemary and Thyme	2:29		
"I Am a Rock" †	1966	Sounds of Silence	2:49	First recorded for The Paul Simon Songbook (1965)	
"I'll Drown in My Tears"	1961	"I'll Drown in My Tears"		Tom and Jerry recording	
"Kathy's Song"	1966	Sounds of Silence	3:17	First recorded for The Paul Simon Songbook (1965)	
"Keep the Customer Satisfied"	1970	Bridge over Troubled Water	2:34		
"Last Night I Had the Strangest Dream"	1964	Wednesday Morning, 3 A.M.	2:04		
"Leaves That Are Green"	1966	Sounds of Silence	2:21		
"Loneliness"	1959	"Anna Belle"	2:14	Tom and Jerry recording	
"Maybelline"	1982	The Concert in Central Park	5:51	Part of a medley alongside Simon's "Kodachrome"	
"A Most Peculiar Man"	1966	Sounds of Silence	2:29	First recorded for The Paul Simon Songbook (1965)	
"Mrs. Robinson" †	1968	Bookends	4:03		
"My Little Town" †	1975	Breakaway; Still Crazy After All These Years †	3:51		
"Old Friends"	1968	Bookends	2:36		
"The Only Living Boy in New York"	1970	Bridge over Troubled Water	3:57		
"Our Song" †	1958	"Our Song"	1:56	Tom and Jerry recording	
"Overs"	1968	Bookends	2:15		
"Patterns"	1966	Parsley, Sage, Rosemary and Thyme	2:45	First recorded for The Paul Simon Songbook (1965)	
"Peggy-O"	1964	Wednesday Morning, 3 A.M.	2:25		
"A Poem on the Underground Wall"	1966	Parsley, Sage, Rosemary and Thyme	1:52		
"(Pretty Baby) Don't Say Goodbye"	1958	"That's My Story"	2:01	Tom and Jerry recording	
"Punky's Dilemma"	1968	Bookends	2:13		
"Red Rubber Ball"	1997	Old Friends	2:29	Previously unissued live recording from 1967	
"Richard Cory"	1966	Sounds of Silence	2:55		
"Rose of Aberdeen"	1966	Sounds of Silence	1:59	Demo released on 2001 compact disc remaster	
"Roving Gambler"	1966	Sounds of Silence	3:04	Demo released on 2001 compact disc remaster	
"Save the Life of My Child"	1968	Bookends	2:49		
"Scarborough Fair/Canticle" †	1966	Parsley, Sage, Rosemary and Thyme	3:10		
"7 O'Clock News/Silent Night"	1966	Parsley, Sage, Rosemary and Thyme	2:02		
"Simon Says"	1959	Tom & Jerry	2:29	Tom and Jerry recording	
"A Simple Desultory Philippic (or How I Was Robert McNamara'd into Submission)"	1966	Parsley, Sage, Rosemary and Thyme	2:10	First recorded for The Paul Simon Songbook (1965)	
"So Long, Frank Lloyd Wright"	1970	Bridge over Troubled Water	3:41		
"Somewhere They Can't Find Me"	1966	Sounds of Silence	2:34		
"Song for the Asking"	1970	Bridge over Troubled Water	1:50		
"The Sound of Silence" †	1964; 1966	Wednesday Morning, 3 A.M. Sounds of Silence	3:05		
"Sparrow"	1964	Wednesday Morning, 3 A.M.	2:47		
"Star Carol"	1967	A Very Merry Christmas	1:46	Christmas recording, appeared on Columbia Special Products compilations A Very Merry Christmas (1967) and Dreaming of a White Christmas (1981)	
"The Sun Is Burning"	1964	Wednesday Morning, 3 A.M.	2:46		
"Surrender, Please Surrender" †	1962	"Surrender, Please Surrender"	2:11	Tom and Jerry recording	
"That Silver-Haired Daddy of Mine" (Gene Autry and Jimmy Long cover)	1997	Old Friends	3:26	Previously unissued live recording	
"Teenage Fool"	1959	Tom & Jerry	2:46	Tom and Jerry recording	
"That's My Story" †	1958	"That's My Story"	2:32	Tom and Jerry recording	
"The Times They Are a-Changin'" (Bob Dylan cover)	1964	Wednesday Morning, 3 A.M.	2:51		
"Tia-Juana Blues"	1959	Tom & Jerry	2:29	Tom and Jerry recording	
"True or False"	1959	Tom & Jerry	2:11	Tom and Jerry recording	
"Two Teen-Agers"	1958	"Our Song"	2:23	Tom and Jerry recording	
"Voices of Old People"	1968	Bookends	2:12		
"Wake Up Little Susie" (The Everly Brothers cover)	1982	The Concert in Central Park	2:19		
"Wednesday Morning, 3 A.M."	1964	Wednesday Morning, 3 A.M.	2:14		
"We've Got a Groovy Thing Goin'"	1966	Sounds of Silence	1:57		
"(What A) Wonderful World" (with James Taylor) (Sam Cooke cover)	1977	Watermark	3:32		
"Why Don't You Write Me"	1970	Bridge over Troubled Water	2:46		
"You Can Tell the World"	1964	Wednesday Morning, 3 A.M.	2:45		
"You Don't Know Where Your Interest Lies"	1967	"Fakin' It"	2:17	B-side to "Fakin' It", later released as a bonus track on 2001 compact disc remaster of Bookends	

== Notes ==
=== Sources ===
- Browne, David (2012). Fire and Rain: The Beatles, Simon and Garfunkel, James Taylor, CSNY, and the Lost Story Of 1970. Da Capo Press. ISBN 978-0-306-82072-4.
- Eliot, Marc (2010). Paul Simon: A Life. John Wiley and Sons. ISBN 978-0-470-43363-8.
