= Simon & Garfunkel: The Complete Albums Collection =

Box set by Simon & Garfunkel
- Released: November 24, 2014
- Recorded: 1964–1970; 2003
- Genre: Folk rock
- Length: 526 minutes
- Label: Columbia

Simon & Garfunkel chronology
Live 1969 (2008)	Simon & Garfunkel: The Complete Albums Collection (2014)

Simon & Garfunkel: The Complete Albums Collection is the fifth box set of Simon & Garfunkel recordings. This 12-CD set contains all five of their studio albums from 1964 to 1970, as well as the soundtrack album from The Graduate from 1968, the 1972 Simon and Garfunkel's Greatest Hits compilation album, and four previously released live concert recordings (including the double album Old Friends: Live on Stage). The CDs are packaged in miniature recreations of the original LP jackets, and an annotated booklet is included.

The set features newly remastered from releases of the albums using first generation analog sources.

The set does not include the bonus tracks that previous album collections included.

== Reception ==
The collection was positively reviewed by the French magazine L'Obs, whose reviewer described it as "An overwhelming beauty". The German magazine Der Spiegel described the collection as "very Christmas" and gave is a score of 8.6 out of 10. The Boston Herald also reviewed the collection positively, stating that "it's obscene to not own all these albums".

Record Collector magazine criticised the lack of mono mixes or previously unreleased material in the collection, but also praised the remastered material saying "it's a treat to hear the charming The Graduate soundtrack remastered for the first time".

== Track listing ==
All songs written by Paul Simon, except as indicated.

Disc one: Wednesday Morning, 3 A.M. (1964)

1. "You Can Tell the World" (Bob Gibson/Bob Camp) – 2:47
2. "Last Night I Had the Strangest Dream" (Ed McCurdy) – 2:11
3. "Bleecker Street" – 2:44
4. "Sparrow" – 2:49
5. "Benedictus" (Traditional, arranged and adapted by Simon and Art Garfunkel) – 2:38
6. "The Sound of Silence" – 3:08
7. "He Was My Brother" (Paul Kane*) – 2:48
8. "Peggy-O" (Traditional) – 2:26
9. "Go Tell It on the Mountain" (Traditional) – 2:06
10. "The Sun Is Burning" (Ian Campbell) – 2:49
11. "The Times They Are a-Changin'" (Bob Dylan) – 2:52
12. "Wednesday Morning, 3 A.M." – 2:13

Disc two: Sounds of Silence (1966)

1. "The Sound of Silence" – 3:08
2. "Leaves That Are Green" – 2:23
3. "Blessed" – 3:16
4. "Kathy's Song" – 3:21
5. "Somewhere They Can't Find Me" – 2:37
6. "Anji" (Davey Graham) – 2:17
7. "Richard Cory" – 2:57
8. "A Most Peculiar Man" – 2:34
9. "April Come She Will" – 1:51
10. "We've Got a Groovy Thing Goin'" – 2:00
11. "I Am a Rock" – 2:50

Disc three: Parsley, Sage, Rosemary and Thyme (1966)

1. "Scarborough Fair/Canticle" (Traditional, arr. by Simon, Garfunkel) – 3:10
2. "Patterns" – 2:42
3. "Cloudy" (Simon, Bruce Woodley) – 2:10
4. "Homeward Bound" – 2:30
5. "The Big Bright Green Pleasure Machine" – 2:44
6. "The 59th Street Bridge Song (Feelin' Groovy)" – 1:43
7. "The Dangling Conversation" – 2:37
8. "Flowers Never Bend with the Rainfall" – 2:10
9. "A Simple Desultory Philippic (or How I Was Robert McNamara'd into Submission)" – 2:12
10. "For Emily, Whenever I May Find Her" – 2:04
11. "A Poem on the Underground Wall" – 1:52
12. "7 O'Clock News/Silent Night" (Josef Mohr, Franz Gruber) – 2:01

Disc four: The Graduate (1968)

1. "The Sound of Silence" (Remix) – 3:06
2. "The Singleman Party Foxtrot" (Written and performed by Dave Grusin) – 2:52
3. "Mrs. Robinson" (Version 1) – 1:12
4. "Sunporch Cha-Cha-Cha" (Written and performed by Grusin) – 2:53
5. "Scarborough Fair/Canticle" (Interlude) – 1:41
6. "On the Strip" (Written and performed by Grusin) – 2:00
7. "April Come She Will" – 1:50
8. "The Folks" (Written and performed by Grusin) – 2:27
9. "Scarborough Fair/Canticle" (Extended version) (Traditional, arr. by Simon, Garfunkel) – 6:22
10. "A Great Effect" (Written and performed by Grusin) – 4:06
11. "The Big Bright Green Pleasure Machine" (Alternate version) – 1:46
12. "Whew" (Written and performed by Grusin) – 2:10
13. "Mrs. Robinson" (Version 2) – 1:12
14. "The Sound of Silence" (Alternate version) – 3:08

Disc five: Bookends (1968)

1. "Bookends Theme" – 0:32
2. "Save the Life of My Child" – 2:49
3. "America" – 3:08
4. "Overs" – 2:14
5. "Voices of Old People" (Garfunkel) – 2:09
6. "Old Friends" – 2:36
7. "Bookends Theme (Reprise)" – 1:16
8. "Fakin' It" – 3:14
9. "Punky's Dilemma" – 2:10
10. "Mrs. Robinson" – 4:02
11. "A Hazy Shade of Winter" – 2:17
12. "At the Zoo" – 2:11

Disc six: Bridge over Troubled Water (1970)

1. "Bridge over Troubled Water" – 4:52
2. "El Condor Pasa (If I Could)" (Daniel Alomía Robles, English lyrics by Simon, arr. by Jorge Milchberg) – 3:06
3. "Cecilia" – 2:54
4. "Keep the Customer Satisfied" – 2:33
5. "So Long, Frank Lloyd Wright" – 3:47
6. "The Boxer" – 5:08
7. "Baby Driver" – 3:14
8. "The Only Living Boy in New York" – 3:58
9. "Why Don't You Write Me" – 2:45
10. "Bye Bye Love" (Live from Ames, Iowa) (Felice and Boudleaux Bryant) – 2:55
11. "Song for the Asking" – 1:51

Disc seven: Greatest Hits (1972)

1. "Mrs. Robinson" – 4:02
2. "For Emily, Whenever I May Find Her" (Live) – 2:25
3. "The Boxer" – 5:10
4. "The 59th Street Bridge Song (Feelin' Groovy)" (Live) – 1:50
5. "The Sound of Silence" (Electric version) – 3:05
6. "I Am a Rock" – 2:52
7. "Scarborough Fair/Canticle" (Traditional; arranged by Simon, Garfunkel) – 3:09
8. "Homeward Bound" (Live) – 2:42
9. "Bridge over Troubled Water" – 4:52
10. "America" – 3:33
11. "Kathy's Song" (Live) – 3:23
12. "El Condor Pasa (If I Could)" (Robles, English lyrics by Simon, arr. by Milchberg) – 3:07
13. "Bookends" – 1:20
14. "Cecilia" – 2:53

Disc eight: The Concert in Central Park (1982)

1. "Mrs. Robinson" – 3:52
2. "Homeward Bound" – 4:22
3. "America" – 4:47
4. "Me and Julio Down by the Schoolyard" – 3:22
5. "Scarborough Fair" (Traditional, arr. by Simon, Garfunkel) – 3:52
6. "April Come She Will" – 2:37
7. "Wake Up Little Susie" (F. and B. Bryant) – 2:19
8. "Still Crazy After All These Years" – 4:04
9. "American Tune" (Simon, melody by Hans Leo Hassler) – 4:33
10. "Late in the Evening" – 4:09
11. "Slip Slidin' Away" – 4:54
12. "A Heart in New York" (Benny Gallagher, Graham Lyle) – 2:49
13. "Kodachrome/Maybellene" (Simon/Chuck Berry) – 5:51
14. "Bridge over Troubled Water" – 4:48
15. "50 Ways to Leave Your Lover" – 4:23
16. "The Boxer" – 6:02
17. "Old Friends" – 2:57
18. "The 59th Street Bridge Song (Feelin' Groovy)" – 2:01
19. "The Sounds of Silence" – 4:13

Disc nine: Old Friends: Live on Stage – Disc 1 (2004)

1. "Old Friends/Bookends" – 3:33
2. "A Hazy Shade of Winter" – 3:33
3. "I Am a Rock" – 4:23
4. "America" – 4:53
5. "At the Zoo" – 1:33
6. "Baby Driver" – 2:58
7. "Kathy's Song" – 3:58
8. "Tom and Jerry Story" – 2:14
9. "Hey, Schoolgirl" – 0:45
10. "The Everly Brothers Intro" – 1:42
11. "Bye Bye Love" (with The Everly Brothers) (F. and B. Bryant) – 3:00
12. "Scarborough Fair/Canticle" (Traditional, arr. by Simon, Garfunkel) – 3:50
13. "Homeward Bound" – 5:41
14. "The Sound of Silence" – 5:04

Disc ten: Old Friends: Live on Stage – Disc 2 (2004)

1. "Mrs. Robinson" – 4:32
2. "Slip Slidin' Away" – 4:59
3. "El Condor Pasa (If I Could)" – 3:34
4. "The Only Living Boy in New York" – 4:03
5. "American Tune" – 4:40
6. "My Little Town" – 4:35
7. "Bridge over Troubled Water" – 6:11
8. "Cecilia" – 4:25
9. "The Boxer" – 5:07
10. "Leaves That Are Green" – 3:22
11. "Citizen of the Planet" – 3:14

Disc eleven: Live from New York City, 1967 (2002)

1. "He Was My Brother" – 3:21
2. "Leaves That Are Green" – 2:57
3. "Sparrow" – 3:06
4. "Homeward Bound" – 2:39
5. "You Don't Know Where Your Interest Lies" – 2:06
6. "A Most Peculiar Man" – 2:59
7. "The 59th Street Bridge Song (Feelin' Groovy)" – 1:49
8. "The Dangling Conversation" – 3:01
9. "Richard Cory" – 3:23
10. "A Hazy Shade of Winter" – 2:37
11. "Benedictus" (Traditional, arr. Simon & Garfunkel) – 2:45
12. "Blessed" – 3:45
13. "A Poem on the Underground Wall" – 4:45
14. "Anji" (Graham) – 2:28
15. "I Am a Rock" – 2:57
16. "The Sound of Silence" – 3:25
17. "For Emily, Whenever I May Find Her" – 2:40
18. "A Church Is Burning" – 3:43
19. "Wednesday Morning, 3 A.M." – 3:35

Disc twelve: Live 1969 (2008)

1. "Homeward Bound" – 3:04 (11/15/69, Long Beach Arena, Long Beach, California)
2. "At the Zoo" – 2:07 (11/27/69, Carnegie Hall, New York City, New York)
3. "59th Street Bridge Song (Feelin' Groovy)" – 1:56 (11/8/69, Carbondale, Illinois)
4. "Song for the Asking" – 2:26 (11/15/69, Long Beach Arena, Long Beach, California)
5. "For Emily, Whenever I May Find Her" – 2:37 (November 1969, St. Louis, Missouri)
6. "Scarborough Fair/Canticle" (Traditional, arr. by Simon, Garfunkel) – 3:56 (11/28/69, Carnegie Hall, New York City, New York)
7. "Mrs. Robinson" – 4:44 (11/8/69, Carbondale, Illinois)
8. "The Boxer" – 4:46 (11/15/69, Long Beach Arena, Long Beach, California)
9. "Why Don't You Write Me" – 2:56 (11/15/69, Long Beach Arena, Long Beach, California)
10. "So Long, Frank Lloyd Wright" – 3:55 (11/8/69, Carbondale, Illinois)
11. "That Silver-Haired Daddy of Mine" (Jimmy Long, Gene Autry) – 3:11 (11/15/69, Long Beach Arena, Long Beach, California)
12. "Bridge over Troubled Water" – 5:25 (11/28/69, Carnegie Hall, New York City, New York)
13. "The Sound of Silence" – 3:52 (11/8/69, Carbondale, Illinois)
14. "I Am a Rock" – 3:36 (11/8/69, Carbondale, Illinois)
15. "Old Friends/Bookends Theme" – 3:22 (11/1/69, Toledo, Ohio)
16. "Leaves That Are Green" – 3:23 (10/30/69, Detroit, Michigan)
17. "Kathy's Song" – 3:53 (November 1969, St. Louis, Missouri)

Note: * – Paul Kane is one of the aliases used by Paul Simon.
