= The Columbia Studio Recordings (1964–1970) =

The Columbia Studio Recordings 1964-1970

Box set by Simon & Garfunkel
- Released: August 21, 2001
- Recorded: March 10, 1964–November 15, 1969
- Genre: Folk rock
- Label: Columbia
- Producer: Bob Irwin

Simon & Garfunkel chronology
Tales from New York (2000)	The Columbia Studio Recordings 1964-1970 (2001)	Live from New York City, 1967 (2002)

Professional ratings
Review scores
Source	Rating
AllMusic	5/5 stars

The Columbia Studio Recordings (1964–1970) is the third box set of Simon & Garfunkel recordings, released in 2001 by Columbia Records. This 5-CD set contains all of their studio albums from 1964 to 1970. The CDs are packaged in miniature recreations of the original LP jackets, and an annotated booklet is also included.

The Columbia Studio Recordings succeeded the box sets Collected Works (1981) and Old Friends (1997). All five discs contain several bonus tracks of demos, alternate takes, single B-sides, unissued outtakes and non-album songs, some of which were previously issued on Old Friends.

== Track listing ==
All songs Written by Paul Simon, except where noted.

=== Disc one ===
Wednesday Morning, 3 A.M. (1964)

1. "You Can Tell the World" (Written by Bob Camp and Bob Gibson ) – 2:45
2. "Last Night I Had the Strangest Dream" (Ed McCurdy) – 2:09
3. "Bleecker Street" – 2:43
4. "Sparrow" – 2:47
5. "Benedictus" (Traditional, arranged and adapted by Simon and Art Garfunkel) – 2:38
6. "The Sound of Silence" – 3:05
7. "He Was My Brother" – 2:49
8. "Peggy-O" (Traditional) – 2:25
9. "Go Tell It on the Mountain" (Traditional) – 2:05
10. "The Sun Is Burning" (Ian Campbell) – 2:46
11. "The Times They Are a-Changin'" (Bob Dylan) – 2:51
12. "Wednesday Morning, 3 A.M." – 2:14

Bonus tracks

13. "Bleecker Street" (Demo) – 2:42
14. "He Was My Brother" (Alt. Take 1) – 2:48
15. "The Sun Is Burning" (Alt. Take 12) – 2:47
- Track 7 is credited to Paul Kane, a pseudonym for Paul Simon.

=== Disc two ===
Sounds of Silence (1966)

1. "The Sound of Silence" – 3:05
2. "Leaves That Are Green" – 2:21
3. "Blessed" – 3:14
4. "Kathy's Song" – 3:17
5. "Somewhere They Can't Find Me" – 2:34
6. "Anji" (Davey Graham) – 2:15
7. "Richard Cory" – 2:55
8. "A Most Peculiar Man" – 2:29
9. "April Come She Will" – 1:49
10. "We've Got a Groovy Thing Goin'" – 1:57
11. "I Am a Rock" – 2:49

Bonus tracks

12. "Blues Run the Game" (Written by Jackson C. Frank) – 2:51
13. "Barbriallen" (Demo) (Traditional-Arranged by Paul Simon and Art Garfunkel) – 4:02
14. "Rose of Aberdeen" (Demo) (Traditional-Arranged by Paul Simon and Art Garfunkel) – 1:59
15. "Roving Gambler" (Demo) (Traditional-Arranged by Paul Simon and Art Garfunkel) – 3:04

=== Disc three ===
Parsley, Sage, Rosemary and Thyme (1966)

1. "Scarborough Fair/Canticle" (Simon, Garfunkel) – 3:10
2. "Patterns" – 2:45
3. "Cloudy" – 2:21
4. "Homeward Bound" – 2:29
5. "The Big Bright Green Pleasure Machine" – 2:47
6. "The 59th Street Bridge Song (Feelin' Groovy)" – 1:53
7. "The Dangling Conversation" – 2:37
8. "Flowers Never Bend With the Rainfall" – 2:10
9. "A Simple Desultory Philippic (or How I Was Robert McNamara'd into Submission)" – 2:19
10. "For Emily, Whenever I May Find Her" – 2:05
11. "A Poem on the Underground Wall" – 1:52
12. "7 O'Clock News/Silent Night" – 2:02

Bonus tracks

13. "Patterns" (Demo) – 2:53
14. "A Poem on the Underground Wall" (Demo) – 1:51

=== Disc four ===
Bookends (1968)

1. "Bookends Theme" – 0:32
2. "Save the Life of My Child" – 2:49
3. "America" – 3:36
4. "Overs" – 2:15
5. "Voices of Old People" (Simon, Garfunkel) – 2:07
6. "Old Friends" – 2:36
7. "Bookends Theme (Reprise)" – 1:20
8. "Fakin' It" – 3:17
9. "Punky's Dilemma" – 2:13
10. "Mrs. Robinson" (From the Motion Picture The Graduate) – 4:03
11. "A Hazy Shade of Winter" – 2:17
12. "At the Zoo" – 2:23

Bonus tracks

13. "You Don't Know Where Your Interest Lies" – 2:17
14. "Old Friends" (Demo) – 2:11

=== Disc five ===
Bridge over Troubled Water (1970)

1. "Bridge over Troubled Water" – 4:52
2. "El Condor Pasa (If I Could)" (Simon, Jorge Milchberg, Daniel Alomía Robles) – 3:06
3. "Cecilia" – 2:55
4. "Keep the Customer Satisfied" – 2:34
5. "So Long, Frank Lloyd Wright" – 3:41
6. "The Boxer" – 5:08
7. "Baby Driver" – 3:15
8. "The Only Living Boy in New York" – 3:57
9. "Why Don't You Write Me" – 2:46
10. "Bye Bye Love" (Felice and Boudleaux Bryant) – 2:53
11. "Song for the Asking" – 1:50

Bonus tracks

12. "Feuilles-O" (Demo) – 1:42
13. "Bridge over Troubled Water" (Demo Take 6) – 4:46
