= Old Friends (1997 Simon and Garfunkel album) =

Box set by Simon and Garfunkel
- Released: November 4, 1997
- Recorded: 1964–1975
- Genre: Folk rock
- Label: Columbia/Legacy
- Producer: Various

Simon and Garfunkel chronology
The Definitive Simon and Garfunkel (1994)	Old Friends (1997)	The Best of Simon and Garfunkel (1999)

Professional ratings
Review scores
Source	Rating
AllMusic	3/5 stars
Uncut	4/5 stars

Old Friends is the second box set of Simon & Garfunkel songs, released in November 1997. The three-disc anthology collects most of the duo's best-known works, as well as previously unreleased outtakes. Some of these outtakes later appeared on the reissues of Simon & Garfunkel's five studio albums, as well as the subsequent boxed set The Columbia Studio Recordings (1964-1970).

== Track listing ==
=== Disc 1 ===
1. "Bleecker Street" - 2:44
  ^{Recorded: March 10, 1964}
  ^{Previously unissued demo version}
2. "The Sound of Silence" - 3:07
  ^{Recorded: March 10, 1964}
  ^{From the album Wednesday Morning, 3 A.M. (1964)}
3. "The Sun Is Burning" - 2:48
  ^{Recorded: March 17, 1964}
  ^{From the album Wednesday Morning, 3 A.M.}
4. "Wednesday Morning, 3 A.M." - 2:15
  ^{Recorded: March 17, 1964}
  ^{From the album Wednesday Morning, 3 A.M.}
5. "He Was My Brother" - 2:50
  ^{Recorded: March 17, 1964}
  ^{From the album Wednesday Morning, 3 A.M.}
6. "Sparrow" - 2:48
  ^{Recorded: March 31, 1964}
  ^{From the album Wednesday Morning, 3 A.M.}
7. "Peggy-O" - 2:26
  ^{Recorded: March 31, 1964}
  ^{From the album Wednesday Morning, 3 A.M.}
8. "Benedictus" - 2:39
  ^{Recorded: March 31, 1964}
  ^{From the album Wednesday Morning, 3 A.M.}
9. "Somewhere They Can't Find Me" - 2:36
  ^{Recorded: April 5, 1965}
  ^{From the album Sounds of Silence (1966)}
10. "We've Got a Groovy Thing Goin'" - 1:59
  ^{Recorded: April 5, 1965}
  ^{From the album Sounds of Silence}
11. "Leaves That Are Green" - 2:22
  ^{Recorded: December 13, 1965}
  ^{From the album Sounds of Silence}
12. "Richard Cory" - 2:57
  ^{Recorded: December 14, 1965}
  ^{From the album Sounds of Silence}
13. "I Am a Rock" - 2:51
  ^{Recorded: December 14, 1965}
  ^{From the album Sounds of Silence}
14. "The Sound of Silence" - 3:07
  ^{Recorded: March 10, 1964 (Basic track); June 15, 1965 (overdubs)}
  ^{From the album Sounds of Silence}
15. "Homeward Bound" - 2:30
  ^{Recorded: December 14, 1965}
  ^{From the album Parsley, Sage, Rosemary and Thyme (U.S. version) (1966); Sounds of Silence (UK version)}
16. "Blues Run the Game" - 2:53
  ^{Recorded: December 21, 1965}
  ^{Previously unissued outtake from the Sounds of Silence sessions}
17. "Kathy's Song" - 3:19
  ^{Recorded: December 21, 1965}
  ^{From the album Sounds of Silence}
18. "April Come She Will" - 1:50
  ^{Recorded: December 21, 1965}
  ^{From the album Sounds of Silence}
19. "Flowers Never Bend with the Rainfall" - 2:10
  ^{Recorded: March 28, 1966}
  ^{From the album Parsley, Sage, Rosemary and Thyme}

=== Disc 2 ===
1. "Patterns" - 2:47
  ^{Recorded: June 8, 1966}
  ^{From the album Parsley, Sage, Rosemary and Thyme}
2. "Cloudy" - 2:23
  ^{Recorded: June 10, 1966}
  ^{From the album Parsley, Sage, Rosemary and Thyme}
3. "The Dangling Conversation" - 2:38
  ^{Recorded: June 21, 1966}
  ^{From the album Parsley, Sage, Rosemary and Thyme}
4. "Scarborough Fair/Canticle" - 3:12
  ^{Recorded: July 26, 1966}
  ^{From the album Parsley, Sage, Rosemary and Thyme}
5. "The 59th Street Bridge Song (Feelin' Groovy)" - 1:55
  ^{Recorded: August 16, 1966}
  ^{From the album Parsley, Sage, Rosemary and Thyme}
6. "For Emily, Whenever I May Find Her" - 2:06
  ^{Recorded: August 22, 1966}
  ^{From the album Parsley, Sage, Rosemary and Thyme}
7. "7 O'Clock News/Silent Night" - 2:04
  ^{Recorded: August 22, 1966}
  ^{From the album Parsley, Sage, Rosemary and Thyme}
8. "A Hazy Shade of Winter" - 2:17
  ^{Recorded: September 7, 1966}
  ^{From the album Bookends (1968)}
9. "At the Zoo" - 2:24
  ^{Recorded: January 18, 1967}
  ^{From the album Bookends}
10. "A Poem on the Underground Wall" - 4:30
  ^{Recorded: January 22, 1967}
  ^{Previously unissued live recording (Lincoln Center, Manhattan, New York City, New York)}
11. "Red Rubber Ball" - 2:28
  ^{Recorded: January 22, 1967}
  ^{Previously unissued live recording (Lincoln Center, Manhattan, New York City, New York)}
12. "Blessed" - 3:39
  ^{Recorded: January 22, 1967}
  ^{Previously unissued live recording (Lincoln Center, Manhattan, New York City, New York)}
13. "Anji" - 2:29
  ^{Recorded: January 22, 1967}
  ^{Previously unissued live recording (Lincoln Center, Manhattan, New York City, New York)}
14. "A Church Is Burning" - 3:29
  ^{Recorded: January 22, 1967}
  ^{Previously unissued live recording (Lincoln Center, Manhattan, New York City, New York)}
15. "Fakin' It" - 3:19
  ^{Recorded: June 6, 1967}
  ^{From the album Bookends}
16. "Save the Life of My Child" - 2:49
  ^{Recorded: December 14, 1967}
  ^{From the album Bookends}
17. "America" - 3:37
  ^{Recorded: February 1, 1968}
  ^{From the album Bookends}
18. "You Don't Know Where Your Interest Lies" - 2:20
  ^{Recorded: June 14, 1967}
  ^{B-side to the "Fakin' It" single}
19. "Punky's Dilemma" - 2:14
  ^{Recorded: October 5, 1967}
  ^{From the album Bookends}
20. "Comfort and Joy" - 1:51
  ^{Recorded: April 19, 1967}
  ^{Previously unissued Christmas recording}
21. "Star Carol" - 1:46
  ^{Recorded: April 19, 1967}
  ^{Christmas recording, previously appeared on Columbia Special Products compilations A Very Merry Christmas (1967) and Dreaming of a White Christmas (1981)}

=== Disc 3 ===
1. "Mrs. Robinson" - 4:04
  ^{Recorded: February 2, 1968}
  ^{From the album Bookends}
2. "Old Friends/Bookends" - 3:57
  ^{Recorded: March 8, 1968}
  ^{From the album Bookends}
3. "Overs" - 3:05
  ^{Recorded: October 13, 1968}
  ^{Previously unissued live recording (Memorial Auditorium, Burlington, Vermont)}
4. "A Most Peculiar Man" - 2:35
  ^{Recorded: October 13, 1968}
  ^{Previously unissued live recording (Memorial Auditorium, Burlington, Vermont)}
5. "Bye Bye Love" - 2:45
  ^{Recorded: October 13, 1968}
  ^{Previously unissued live recording (Memorial Auditorium, Burlington, Vermont)}
6. "The Boxer" - 5:09
  ^{Recorded: November 16, 1968}
  ^{From the album Bridge over Troubled Water (1970)}
7. "Baby Driver" - 3:16
  ^{Recorded: November 19, 1968}
  ^{From the album Bridge over Troubled Water}
8. "Why Don't You Write Me" - 2:46
  ^{Recorded: June 13, 1969}
  ^{From the album Bridge over Troubled Water}
9. "Feuilles-O" - 1:42
  ^{Recorded: August 11, 1969}
  ^{Previously unissued demo}
10. "Keep the Customer Satisfied" - 2:36
  ^{Recorded: October 27, 1969}
  ^{From the album Bridge over Troubled Water}
11. "So Long, Frank Lloyd Wright" - 3:43
  ^{Recorded: October 28, 1969}
  ^{From the album Bridge over Troubled Water}
12. "Song for the Asking" - 1:51
  ^{Recorded: November 1, 1969}
  ^{From the album Bridge over Troubled Water}
13. "Cecilia" - 2:56
  ^{Recorded: November 2, 1969}
  ^{From the album Bridge over Troubled Water}
14. "El Condor Pasa (If I Could)" - 3:08
  ^{Recorded: November 2, 1969}
  ^{From the album Bridge over Troubled Water}
15. "Bridge over Troubled Water" - 4:54
  ^{Recorded: November 9, 1969}
  ^{From the album Bridge over Troubled Water}
16. "The Only Living Boy in New York" - 4:00
  ^{Recorded: November 15, 1969}
  ^{From the album Bridge over Troubled Water}
17. "Hey, Schoolgirl/Black Slacks" - 1:32
  ^{Recorded: November 28, 1969}
  ^{Previously unissued live recording (Carnegie Hall, New York City, New York)}
18. "That Silver-Haired Daddy of Mine" - 3:28
  ^{Recorded: November 28, 1969}
  ^{Previously unissued live recording (Carnegie Hall, New York City, New York)}
19. "My Little Town" - 3:50
  ^{Recorded: May 1975}
  ^{Previously appeared on Paul Simon's album Still Crazy After All These Years and Art Garfunkel's album Breakaway (both from 1975)}

== Charts ==
Chart performance for Old Friends
Chart (1998)	Peak position
Australian Albums (ARIA)	68

== Certifications ==
Certifications for Old Friends
Region	Certification	Certified units/sales
United Kingdom (BPI)	Gold	100,000^{^}
United States (RIAA)	Gold	500,000^{^}
^{^} Shipments figures based on certification alone.
