= Collected Works (Simon and Garfunkel album) =

- Cover to the CD edition

Box set by Simon and Garfunkel
- Released: 1981
- Recorded: 1964–1970
- Genre: Folk rock
- Length: 156:57
- Label: Columbia
- Producers: Tom Wilson, Bob Johnston, Paul Simon, Art Garfunkel, Roy Halee

Simon and Garfunkel chronology
Simon and Garfunkel's Greatest Hits (1972)	Collected Works (1981)	The Simon and Garfunkel Collection: 17 of Their All-Time Greatest Recordings (1981)

Collected Works is the first box set released by Simon & Garfunkel in 1981. It contains all five of their studio albums: Wednesday Morning, 3 A.M., Sounds of Silence, Parsley, Sage, Rosemary and Thyme, Bookends, and Bridge over Troubled Water. Originally released in 1981 as a 5-LP box set, it was reissued as a 3-CD set in 1990.

The collection was succeeded in 2001 by The Columbia Studio Recordings (1964–1970), which includes several bonus tracks in addition to the original album contents.

== Track listing (CD edition) ==
Disc one

Wednesday Morning, 3 A.M.

1. "You Can Tell the World" – 2:45
2. "Last Night I Had the Strangest Dream" – 2:12
3. "Bleecker Street" – 2:45
4. "Sparrow" – 2:49
5. "Benedictus" – 2:41
6. "The Sound of Silence" (Original acoustic version) – 3:07
7. "He Was My Brother" – 2:50
8. "Peggy-O" – 2:24
9. "Go Tell It on the Mountain" – 2:06
10. "The Sun Is Burning" – 2:49
11. "The Times They Are a-Changin'" – 2:54
12. "Wednesday Morning, 3 A.M." – 2:17

Sounds of Silence

13. "The Sound of Silence" (Electric instrument overdubs on the original acoustic version) – 3:08
14. "Leaves That Are Green" – 2:23
15. "Blessed" – 3:16
16. "Kathy's Song" – 3:21
17. "Somewhere They Can't Find Me" – 2:37
18. "Anji" – 2:17
19. "Richard Cory" – 2:57
20. "A Most Peculiar Man" – 2:33
21. "April Come She Will" – 1:51
22. "We've Got a Groovy Thing Goin'" – 1:59
23. "I Am a Rock" – 2:49

Disc two

Parsley, Sage, Rosemary and Thyme

1. "Scarborough Fair/Canticle" – 3:11
2. "Patterns" – 2:44
3. "Cloudy" – 2:14
4. "Homeward Bound" – 2:30
5. "The Big Bright Green Pleasure Machine" – 2:45
6. "The 59th Street Bridge Song (Feelin' Groovy)" – 1:40
7. "The Dangling Conversation" – 2:39
8. "Flowers Never Bend with the Rainfall" – 2:12
9. "A Simple Desultory Philippic (Or How I Was Robert McNamara'd Into Submission)" – 2:11
10. "For Emily, Whenever I May Find Her" – 2:04
11. "A Poem on the Underground Wall" – 1:55
12. "7 O'Clock News/Silent Night" – 1:58

Bookends

13. "Bookends Theme" – 0:32
14. "Save the Life of My Child" – 2:49
15. "America" – 3:41
16. "Overs" – 2:11
17. "Voices of Old People" – 2:06
18. "Old Friends" - 2:35
19. "Bookends Theme" (Reprise) – 1:22
20. "Fakin' It" – 3:17
21. "Punky's Dilemma" – 2:14
22. "Mrs. Robinson" – 4:04
23. "A Hazy Shade of Winter" – 2:17
24. "At the Zoo" – 2:22

Disc three

Bridge over Troubled Water

1. "Bridge over Troubled Water" – 4:54
2. "El Condor Pasa (If I Could)" – 3:05
3. "Cecilia" – 2:54
4. "Keep the Customer Satisfied" – 2:33
5. "So Long, Frank Lloyd Wright" – 3:47
6. "The Boxer" – 5:09
7. "Baby Driver" – 3:14
8. "The Only Living Boy in New York" – 3:59
9. "Why Don't You Write Me" – 2:45
10. "Bye Bye Love" – 2:55
11. "Song for the Asking" – 1:49
