= Tales from New York: The Very Best of Simon & Garfunkel =

Greatest hits album by Simon and Garfunkel
- Released: March 28, 2000
- Recorded: 1964–1975
- Genre: Folk rock
- Length: 115:22
- Label: Columbia Records

Simon and Garfunkel chronology
Two Can Dream Alone (2000)	Tales from New York: The Very Best of Simon & Garfunkel (2000)	The Columbia Studio Recordings (1964–1970) (2001)

Professional ratings
Review scores
Source	Rating
AllMusic	4.5/5 stars

Tales from New York: The Very Best of Simon & Garfunkel is a 40-track expanded version of The Best of Simon and Garfunkel compilation album, and the first 2-CD double album of greatest hits by the duo Simon & Garfunkel, released on March 28, 2000.

== Track listing ==
=== Disc 1 ===
1. "The Sound of Silence"
2. "Wednesday Morning, 3 A.M."
3. "The Sun Is Burning"
4. "Peggy-O"
5. "Benedictus"
6. "He Was My Brother"
7. "We've Got a Groovy Thing Goin'"
8. "Homeward Bound"
9. "I Am a Rock"
10. "Kathy's Song"
11. "April Come She Will"
12. "Leaves That Are Green"
13. "Flowers Never Bend with the Rainfall"
14. "The Dangling Conversation"
15. "Scarborough Fair/Canticle"
16. "Patterns"
17. "Cloudy"
18. "For Emily, Whenever I May Find Her"
19. "Save the Life of My Child"
20. "7 O'Clock News/Silent Night"

=== Disc 2 ===
1. "A Hazy Shade of Winter"
2. "The 59th Street Bridge Song (Feelin' Groovy)"
3. "At the Zoo"
4. "Fakin' It"
5. "Punky's Dilemma"
6. "You Don't Know Where Your Interest Lies"
7. "Mrs. Robinson"
8. "Old Friends/Bookends"
9. "The Boxer"
10. "Baby Driver"
11. "Keep the Customer Satisfied"
12. "So Long, Frank Lloyd Wright"
13. "Bridge over Troubled Water"
14. "Cecilia"
15. "The Only Living Boy in New York"
16. "Bye Bye Love"
17. "Song for the Asking"
18. "El Condor Pasa (If I Could)"
19. "America"
20. "My Little Town"

== Certifications ==
Region	Certification	Certified units/sales
Australia (ARIA)	Gold	35,000^{^}
New Zealand (RMNZ)	3× Platinum	45,000^{^}
Spain (Promusicae)	Gold	50,000^{^}
Sweden (GLF)	Gold	40,000^{^}
United Kingdom (BPI)	Gold	100,000^{^}
^{^} Shipments figures based on certification alone.
