= The Simon and Garfunkel Collection: 17 of Their All-Time Greatest Recordings =

Compilation album by Simon & Garfunkel
- Released: November 1981
- Recorded: March 1964–November 1969
- Genre: Folk rock
- Length: 48:17
- Label: Columbia
- Producer: Tom Wilson, Bob Johnston, Paul Simon, Arthur Garfunkel, Roy Halee

Simon & Garfunkel chronology
Collected Works (1981)	The Simon and Garfunkel Collection: 17 of Their All-Time Greatest Recordings (1981)	The Concert in Central Park (1982)

The Simon and Garfunkel Collection: 17 of Their All-Time Greatest Recordings is the second compilation album of greatest hits by Simon & Garfunkel, first issued in November 1981, 2 months after performing at the landmark The Concert in Central Park.

Unlike the first compilation album Simon and Garfunkel's Greatest Hits from 1972, it contained no new or live material. Instead it featured recordings by the duo originally released between 1964 and 1972 from all 5 studio albums and every studio single, excepting "The Dangling Conversation" and "Fakin' It", whilst adding the non-single title track from their first album Wednesday Morning, 3 A.M., as well as "Song for the Asking", the last track on their final album, Bridge Over Troubled Water.

Two full songs from the Bookends album are included as one track: "Old Friends" segues into the “Bookends Theme (Reprise)”, as it does on Bookends and the B-side of the “Mrs. Robinson” single. This is in contrast to the "clean" version of "Bookends" (without the segued string from "Old Friends") which was featured on Simon and Garfunkel's Greatest Hits. This makes the title of the album slightly erroneous, since there are effectively a total of 18 songs included.

== Track listing ==
All songs written by Paul Simon, except where noted

1. "I Am a Rock"
2. "Homeward Bound"
3. "America"
4. "The 59th Street Bridge Song (Feelin' Groovy)"
5. "Wednesday Morning, 3 A.M."
6. "El Condor Pasa (If I Could)" (Daniel Alomía Robles, English lyrics by Simon, arranged by Jorge Milchberg)
7. "At the Zoo"
8. "Scarborough Fair/Canticle" (traditional, arr. Simon & Art Garfunkel with Canticle by Simon)
9. "The Boxer"
10. "The Sound of Silence"
11. "Mrs. Robinson"
12. "Keep the Customer Satisfied"
13. "Song for the Asking"
14. "A Hazy Shade of Winter"
15. "Cecilia"
16. "Old Friends/Bookends Theme (Reprise)"
17. "Bridge over Troubled Water"

== Personnel ==
- Paul Simon – Guitar, Vocals
- Art Garfunkel – Vocals

== Charts ==
=== Weekly charts ===
Chart (1981-1997)	Position
Australian Kent Music Report Albums Chart	3
Dutch Mega Albums Chart	4
French SNEP Albums Chart	6
Austrian Albums Chart	8
German Media Control Albums Chart	2
Japanese Oricon LPs Chart	23
New Zealand Albums Chart	1
Spanish Albums Chart	1
Swedish Albums Chart	49
UK Albums Chart	4

=== Year-end charts ===
Chart (1981)	Position
Australian Albums Chart	95
New Zealand Albums (RMNZ)	50
UK Albums Chart	36
Chart (1982)	Position
Australian Albums Chart	41
UK Albums Chart	75
Chart (1988)	Position
Dutch Albums Chart	20
Chart (1989)	Position
Dutch Albums Chart	62

== Certifications and sales ==
Region	Certification	Certified units/sales
Australia (ARIA)	3× Platinum	150,000^{^}
Finland (Musiikkituottajat)	Platinum	58,327
France (SNEP)	2× Platinum	600,000^{*}
Germany (BVMI)	Gold	250,000^{^}
Hong Kong (IFPI Hong Kong)	Gold	10,000^{*}
Japan (Oricon Charts)	—	227,000
Netherlands (NVPI)	2× Platinum	200,000^{^}
New Zealand (RMNZ)	Platinum	15,000^{^}
Portugal (AFP)	Gold	20,000^{^}
Switzerland (IFPI Switzerland)	2× Platinum	100,000^{^}
United Kingdom (BPI)	3× Platinum	1,500,000
^{*} Sales figures based on certification alone.^{^} Shipments figures based on certification alone.
