= The Collection: Simon & Garfunkel =

Compilation album by Simon & Garfunkel
- Released: November 26, 2007
- Recorded: 1964–1970
- Genre: Folk rock
- Length: 3:14:37 (excluding disc six)
- Label: Columbia

Simon & Garfunkel chronology
Old Friends: Live on Stage (2004)	The Collection: Simon & Garfunkel (2007)	Live 1969 (2008)

The Collection: Simon & Garfunkel is the fourth box set of Simon & Garfunkel recordings. Initially released November 15, 2004, as a 3-CD set of the second, fourth and fifth Simon & Garfunkel studio albums, it was later reissued November 26, 2007, expanded to six discs, including all five studio albums, plus a DVD of the September 19, 1981, free concert in Central Park. All six discs are in a mini-LP format and the albums come with the bonus tracks that were presented in The Columbia Studio Recordings (1964-1970). All of the discs in the 6-CD collection, and their cases, are housed in a box set featuring a silhouetted image of the duo with Paul Simon holding an acoustic guitar and Art Garfunkel sitting on a stool. The earlier 3-CD set had alternative artwork with a photo of the duo.

== Track listing ==
All the following albums were included in the 6-CD box set, listed with their original release dates. Refer to each album page for track lists, personnel lists, and production credits.

1. Wednesday Morning, 3 A.M. – October 1964
2. Sounds of Silence – January 1966
3. Parsley, Sage, Rosemary and Thyme – October 1966
4. Bookends – April 1968
5. Bridge over Troubled Water – January 1970
6. The Concert in Central Park (DVD)

Producers: Tom Wilson, Bob Johnston, Paul Simon, Arthur Garfunkel, Roy Halee
