= 20 Greatest Hits (Simon & Garfunkel album) =

Compilation album by Simon & Garfunkel
- Released: August 3, 1991
- Genre: Folk
- Label: Sony

Simon & Garfunkel chronology
The Concert in Central Park (1982)	20 Greatest Hits (1991)	The Definitive Simon and Garfunkel (1991)

20 Greatest Hits is the third compilation album of greatest hits by Simon & Garfunkel, released in Australia and Asia in August 1991.

== Track listing ==
1. "The Sound of Silence"
2. "Homeward Bound"
3. "I Am a Rock"
4. "America"
5. "59th Street Bridge Song (Feelin' Groovy)"
6. "Cloudy"
7. "At the Zoo"
8. "El Condor Pasa (If I Could)"
9. "A Hazy Shade of Winter"
10. "We Got a Groovy Thing Going"
11. "Cecilia"
12. "Keep the Customer Satisfied"
13. "Mrs Robinson"
14. "The Boxer"
15. "Scarborough Fair/Canticle"
16. "The Dangling Conversation"
17. "Old Friends"
18. "For Emily, Whenever I May Find Her"
19. "Bridge over Troubled Water"
20. "Song For The Asking"

== Personnel ==
- Paul Simon – Vocals, Guitar
- Art Garfunkel – Vocals

== Charts ==
=== Weekly charts ===
Chart (1991)	Peak position
New Zealand Albums (RMNZ)	1

=== Year-end charts ===
Chart (1991)	Position
New Zealand Albums (RMNZ)	15

== Certifications ==
Region	Certification	Certified units/sales
Australia (ARIA)	Gold	35,000^{^}
New Zealand (RMNZ)	Platinum	15,000^{^}
^{^} Shipments figures based on certification alone.
