= Complete Albums Collection =

The Complete Albums Collection is a series by Legacy Recordings including:

- The Complete Albums Collection (Judas Priest box set)
- The Complete Albums Collection - 2013 box set by Paul Simon
- Simon & Garfunkel: The Complete Albums Collection
- The Complete Album Collection - 2017 box set by Tim Buckley
- The Complete Album Collection - 2012 box set by Charles Mingus
- The Complete Album Collection - 2014 box set by Billy Joel
- The Complete Albums Collection - 2017 box set by Rob Halford
