= Two Can Dream Alone =

Compilation album by Simon & Garfunkel
- Released: 2000
- Recorded: 1957–1963
- Genre: Rock
- Label: Burning Airlines

Simon & Garfunkel chronology
The Best of Simon and Garfunkel (1999)	Two Can Dream Alone (2000)	Tales from New York (2000)

Two Can Dream Alone is a compilation album by folk rock duo Simon & Garfunkel. The album is a collection of songs from before they recorded their debut album, Wednesday Morning, 3 A.M.. It also has solo recordings by both Paul Simon and Art Garfunkel during this era of their careers. It contains all of Simon & Garfunkel's singles from these years. Six years after its release, a similar album was released which contains all Paul Simon songs except for "Beat Love" by Art Garfunkel, which appears on both albums. The songs on that album are also from their early years.

== Track listing ==
All songs written by Paul Simon, except where noted

1. "Dream Alone" [Art Garfunkel]
2. "Beat Love" [Art Garfunkel]
3. "Beat Love (With Harmony)" [Art Garfunkel]
4. "I Love You (Oh Yes I Do)" [Art Garfunkel]
5. "Just a Boy"
6. "Play Me a Sad Song"
7. "It Means a Lot to Them"
8. "Flame"
9. "Shy"
10. "Soldier and a Song (Light Your Way)" [Art Garfunkel]
11. "The Lone Teen Ranger"
12. "Hey Schoolgirl" [Simon & Garfunkel]
13. "Our Song" [Simon & Garfunkel]
14. "That's My Story" [Simon & Garfunkel]
15. "Teenage Fool"
16. "Tia-Juana Blues"
17. "Dancin' Wild" [Simon, Garfunkel]
18. "Don't Say Goodbye" [Simon, Garfunkel]
19. "Two Teenagers" [Simon, Garfunkel]
20. "True or False"
21. "Simon Says"
