= The Hit Sounds of Simon and Garfunkel =

Compilation album by Simon & Garfunkel
- Released: 1966
- Genre: Pop
- Label: Pickwick

The Hit Sounds of Simon and Garfunkel was a "Cash-In" Simon and Garfunkel album released in 1966 by Pickwick Records. The label decided that it would capitalize on the duo's newfound fame by releasing this album, consisting of ten tracks recorded from the late 1950s while the duo still called themselves Tom and Jerry. Simon and Garfunkel sued Pickwick because the company was presenting the music as recently recorded material. Pickwick eventually withdrew the album from the market.

== Track listing ==
=== Side 1 ===
1. "Hey School Girl" (2:15)
2. "Our Song" (2:25)
3. "That's My Story" (2:33)
4. "Teen Age Fool" (2:47)
5. "Tia-Juana Blues" (2:32)

=== Side 2 ===
1. "Dancin' Wild" (2:17)
2. "Don't Say Goodbye (2:00)
3. "Two Teen Agers" (2:25)
4. "True or False" (2:09)
5. "Simon Says" (2:34)
