= Voices of Old People =

Song by Simon & Garfunkel

from the album Bookends
- Released: April 3, 1968
- Genre: Experimental
- Length: 2:07
- Label: Columbia
- Songwriter: Art Garfunkel

"Voices of Old People" is a song by the American folk pop duo Simon & Garfunkel that was released on the duo's 1968 album Bookends.

== Recording ==
According to the liner notes, Garfunkel had recorded old people all across New Rochelle and Los Angeles in various places such as nursing homes.

== Reception ==
Reviewing the song for AllMusic, Matthew Greenwald said that the song was "More of a spoken word audio collage than a 'song,' this piece, which was taped at convalescent homes in Southern California, helps to underline the feeling of aging and the passage of time, themes that are indeed paramount. Sometimes sad, as well as comical, the voices on the record are touching, especially when you consider the fact that they probably died a few years from the date of recording." Mojo called it a seamless sweep.
