= Punky's Dilemma =

Song by Simon & Garfunkel

from the album Bookends
- Recorded: October 5, 1967
- Genre: Folk rock
- Length: 2:10
- Label: Columbia
- Songwriter: Paul Simon
- Producers: Paul Simon, Art Garfunkel, John Simon

"Punky's Dilemma" is a song by American music duo Simon & Garfunkel from their fourth studio album, Bookends (1968).

== Background ==
"Punky's Dilemma" was one of two songs (the other being "Overs") that Paul Simon offered to director Mike Nichols for his film The Graduate. Nichols was not particularly taken with either, which led to Simon writing "Mrs. Robinson".

The song was partially worked on by John Simon (no relation), who was hired to "kick-start" the recording when Paul Simon had writer's block. Morgan Ames, writer for High Fidelity magazine, attended a recording session during which "Punky's Dilemma" was being constructed, in October 1967. The team spent over 50 studio hours recording "Punky's Dilemma", re-recording vocal parts, sometimes note by note, until they were satisfied.

== Composition ==
"Punky’s Dilemma" is breezy and minimal musically, with a soft jazz-style percussion and seemingly improvised guitar lines dominated by seventh chords. As rock critic Robert Christgau wrote, the song "seems the essence of lightheartedness on casual hearing but is really a poignant and ironic presentation of a young man's military alternatives: resisting or playing along with the draft."

== Notes ==
=== Sources ===
- Bennighof, James (2007). The Words and Music of Paul Simon. Greenwood Publishing Group. ISBN 978-0-275-99163-0.
- Eliot, Marc (2010). Paul Simon: A Life. John Wiley and Sons. ISBN 978-0-470-43363-8.
- Fornatale, Pete (2007). Simon and Garfunkel's Bookends. Rodale. ISBN 978-1-59486-427-8.
