= Overs (song) =

Song by Simon & Garfunkel

from the album Bookends
- Recorded: October 16, 1967; Columbia Studio A (New York City)
- Genre: Folk rock
- Length: 2:14
- Label: Columbia
- Songwriter: Paul Simon
- Producers: Paul Simon; Art Garfunkel; John Simon

"Overs" is a song by American music duo Simon & Garfunkel from their fourth studio album, Bookends (1968).

== Background ==
"Overs" was one of many songs completed during the duo's sessions with John Simon, alongside "Fakin' It", "Save the Life of My Child" and "Punky's Dilemma". The song concerns an old couple beginning to tire of one another. In their 1968 appearance on Kraft Music Hall, Simon explained that "Overs" is a companion piece to their earlier composition, "For Emily, Whenever I May Find Her"; that song concerns the belief in true love, while "Overs" relates to the loss of that belief.

It has been suggested that the song, which was originally written for but cut from The Graduate (1968), was inspired by the film’s depiction of two lovers (the Robinsons) in a loveless marriage. The lyrics contain almost no rhyme.

== Composition ==
"Overs" is a departure from Simon’s earlier work in that it reveals "increasing independence from standard diatonic, major/minor, and/or modal rock- and folk-based styles." As a result, it "displays a logical consequence of both of these trends: a more jazz-oriented style", including a larger selection of chords and looser form. The song contains multiple instances of wordplay related to the word over, including the final line, "I stop and think it over."

The sound effects at the start of the song are of somebody striking a match to light up and inhale a cigarette.

== Bibliography ==
- Bennighof, James (2007). The Words and Music of Paul Simon. Greenwood Publishing Group. ISBN 978-0-275-99163-0.
- Fornatale, Pete (2007). Simon and Garfunkel's Bookends. Rodale. ISBN 978-1-59486-427-8.
