= Richard Cory (song) =

Song by Simon and Garfunkel

from the album Sounds of Silence
- Released: January 17, 1966
- Recorded: December 1965
- Genre: Folk rock
- Length: 2:57
- Label: Columbia
- Songwriter: Paul Simon
- Producer: Bob Johnston

"Richard Cory" is a song written by Paul Simon in early 1965, and recorded by Simon and Garfunkel for their second studio album, Sounds of Silence. The song was based on Edwin Arlington Robinson's 1897 poem of the same title.

The inspiration for this song comes from the poem that was required reading in English class while Paul Simon and Arthur Garfunkel were students at Forest Hills High School in New York City.

== Plot ==
The song tells the tale of Richard Cory from the perspective of a man who works in his factory. The worker is envious of Cory. The advantages and recreations available to Richard Cory are enumerated in the song and the worker openly envies not only these specific advantages but Cory's presumed happiness. The last verse of the song ends similarly to the Robinson poem: Richard Cory went home last night and put a bullet through his head. Whereas the original poem concludes with this closing revelation and its implications, the repetition of the chorus in Simon's version (still pressing an insistent envy following Cory's suicide) discloses a second, darker revelation about what the worker wants.

== Personnel ==
- Paul Simon – joint lead vocal, guitar
- Art Garfunkel – joint lead vocal
- Joe South – guitar
- Hal Blaine – drums

== Covers and popular culture references ==
The song was covered by Wings during their 1975–1976 Wings Over The World tour (available on the 1976 album Wings Over America). Denny Laine sang lead. In the version released on Wings Over America, during the first chorus line Laine (jokingly) substitutes John Denver's name for Richard Cory's, thus inciting a roar of laughter and applause from the audience. Bill King, reviewing the album in the Atlanta Constitution at the time of its release, interpreted this as "a little stage humour".

The song has also been covered by Van Morrison during his tenure with Them. the Watchmen, the Heptones, Angst, the Back Porch Majority, Yami Bolo, Cuby & the Blizzards, Chicago Loop and Martini Ranch also covered the song.

Jamaican singer Ken Boothe performed a version of the Paul Simon song in an early reggae style for his 1968 album More of Ken Boothe. It was recorded in the Studio One and produced by C. S. Dodd.

A live cover by Mark Seymour appears on Live At the Continental, which was packaged with King Without a Clue (1997).

The song was covered by the band Unborn Ghost in 2023 as a single, and on their album Airs of Contempt and Derision.

The song inspired comic book author Steve Gerber's naming of the fictional character Richard Rory.
