= Save the Life of My Child =

Song by Simon & Garfunkel

from the album Bookends
- Recorded: December 14, 1967; Columbia Studio A
- Studio: Columbia 7th Ave, New York City
- Genre: Psychedelic rock
- Length: 2:49
- Label: Columbia
- Songwriter: Paul Simon
- Producers: Paul Simon; Art Garfunkel; John Simon

"Save the Life of My Child" is a song by American music duo Simon & Garfunkel from their fourth studio album, Bookends (1968).

== Background ==
"Save the Life of My Child" was one of many songs on Bookends recorded with production assistant John Simon.

== Composition ==
An audio sample of the band's first hit, "The Sound of Silence", softly plays during a cacophony of sounds near the end of "Save the Life of My Child". John Simon, who was credited with production assistance on the song, created the bassline by playing a Moog synthesizer with help from Robert Moog himself. James Bennighof, author of The Words and Music of Paul Simon, considers the churning, distorted groove and electronic instrumentation an accompanying textural element to the subject matter: suicidal suburban youth. "Save the Life of My Child" is a dramatic story involving drugs, violence and a mother and child relationship. According to Bennighof, the song "deals with individual crises in crowded urban settings, along with references to larger societal forces and at least a hint of some transcendent perspective."

== Bibliography ==
- Bennighof, James (2007). The Words and Music of Paul Simon. Greenwood Publishing Group. ISBN 978-0-275-99163-0.
- Eliot, Marc (2010). Paul Simon: A Life. John Wiley and Sons. ISBN 978-0-470-43363-8.
- Fornatale, Pete (2007). Simon and Garfunkel's Bookends. Rodale. ISBN 978-1-59486-427-8.
