= Cloudy (song) =

Song by Simon & Garfunkel

from the album Parsley, Sage, Rosemary and Thyme
- Recorded: June 10, 1966
- Genre: Folk rock
- Length: 2:13
- Label: Columbia
- Songwriters: Paul Simon; Bruce Woodley
- Producer: Bob Johnston

"Cloudy" is a song by American music duo Simon & Garfunkel from their third studio album, Parsley, Sage, Rosemary and Thyme (1966). It was co-written by Paul Simon and Bruce Woodley of the Seekers; that band later covered it on their 1967 album Seekers Seen in Green. The Cyrkle released a version of the song on their 1966 debut album, Red Rubber Ball.

== Composition ==
"Cloudy" employs a "breezy, almost jazzy musical style," with its title serving as a "point of departure for [its] scattered, whimsical text."

== Bibliography ==
- Bennighof, James (2007). The Words and Music of Paul Simon. Greenwood Publishing Group. ISBN 978-0-275-99163-0.
