= Sounds of Silence =

Studio album by Simon & Garfunkel
- Released: January 17, 1966
- Recorded: April 5 – December 22, 1965; (except March 10, 1964 for "The Sound of Silence" backing track)
- Studios: Columbia 7th Ave, New York City
- Genre: Folk rock
- Length: 29:09 (Original US LP), 31:39 (UK LP), 41:15 (CD w/ bonus tracks)
- Label: Columbia
- Producers: Bob Johnston, Tom Wilson

Simon & Garfunkel chronology
Wednesday Morning, 3 A.M. (1964)	Sounds of Silence (1966)	Parsley, Sage, Rosemary and Thyme (1966)

Singles from Sounds of Silence
- 1. "The Sound of Silence" Released: September 12, 1965; 2. "Homeward Bound" Released: January 19, 1966; 3. "I Am a Rock" Released: May 1966

Sounds of Silence is the second studio album by the American folk rock duo Simon & Garfunkel, released on January 17, 1966. The album's title is a slight modification of the title of the duo's first major hit, "The Sound of Silence", which originally was released as "The Sounds of Silence". The song had earlier been released in an acoustic version on the album Wednesday Morning, 3 A.M., and later on the soundtrack to the movie The Graduate. Without the knowledge of Paul Simon or Art Garfunkel, electric guitars, bass and drums were overdubbed under the direction of Columbia Records staff producer Tom Wilson on June 15, 1965. This new version was released as a single in September 1965, and opens the album.

"Homeward Bound" was released on the album in the UK, with a unique, dry mix not found elsewhere, placed at the beginning of Side 2 before "Richard Cory". It was later released in the US on the following album, Parsley, Sage, Rosemary and Thyme. It was also released as part of the box set Simon & Garfunkel Collected Works, on both LP and CD. Many of the songs in the album had been written by Paul Simon while he lived in London during 1965.

Solo acoustic versions of "I Am a Rock", "Leaves That Are Green", "April Come She Will", "A Most Peculiar Man", and "Kathy's Song" had appeared on The Paul Simon Songbook, released in August 1965 in England as had another version of the title track. "Richard Cory" was based on the poem "Richard Cory" by Edwin Arlington Robinson, "Somewhere They Can't Find Me" was essentially a rewrite of the previous album's "Wednesday Morning, 3 A.M.", "We've Got a Groovy Thing Goin'" had appeared on the b-side of "The Sound of Silence" a few months before and "Anji" was a cover of an instrumental piece by guitarist Davey Graham whom Simon had met in England. Hence the only brand new Paul Simon composition on the album was "Blessed".

The album is also included in its entirety as part of the Simon & Garfunkel box sets Collected Works and The Columbia Studio Recordings (1964–1970). On March 22, 2013, it was announced that the album will be preserved by the Library of Congress in the National Recording Registry, calling it "culturally, historically, or aesthetically significant".

Professional ratings
Review scores
Source	Rating
AllMusic	3.5/5 stars
Record Mirror	3/5 stars

== Cover artwork ==
The album cover photo features the duo on a trail looking back towards the camera. It was shot by Guy Webster at Franklin Canyon Park in Los Angeles, California. The secondary school scarves they are wearing were from The Campion School, Hornchurch, UK. This school was attended by the boys of the Brentwood family, where Simon lodged during his time in the UK. The back of the LP has candid shots of the duo and quotes a few lyrics from each song.

There are three variations of the original LP's artwork. The first issue lists the duo's names' fully capitalized on one line, the album title fully capitalized on another, and no song titles. The second issue capitalizes only the first letter of each word and features the tracklist. The third has the same front cover as the second, but the back cover airbrushes out the copies of Tiger Beat magazine Garfunkel is holding in the photos.

The original LP label mistakenly spells "Anji" as "Angie" and credits it to Bert Jansch, who had recorded it for his 1965 debut album. The back cover of the original LP sleeve properly credits Davey Graham as composer but retains the "Angie" misspelling. Both errors were corrected for subsequent reissues.

On older LP and CD issues of the album, "The Sound of Silence" is titled as "The Sounds of Silence" on both the cover and label, and "We've Got a Groovy Thing Goin'" is titled "We've Got a Groovey Thing Goin'".

== Track listing ==
=== Original release ===
All tracks are written by Paul Simon, except where noted.

Side one
No.	Title	Writer(s)	Recorded	Length
1.	"The Sound of Silence"		March 10, 1964 (basic track); June 15, 1965 (overdubs)	3:08
2.	"Leaves That Are Green"		December 13, 1965	2:23
3.	"Blessed"		December 21, 1965	3:16
4.	"Kathy's Song"		December 21, 1965	3:20
5.	"Somewhere They Can't Find Me"	Paul Simon/Davey Graham	April 5, 1965	2:37
6.	"Anji" (instrumental)	Davey Graham	December 13, 1965	2:15
Total length:				16:59

Side two
No.	Title	Recorded	Length
1.	"Richard Cory"	December 14, 1965	2:57
2.	"A Most Peculiar Man"	December 22, 1965	2:32
3.	"April Come She Will"	December 21, 1965	1:51
4.	"We've Got a Groovy Thing Goin'"	April 5, 1965	2:00
5.	"I Am a Rock"	December 14, 1965	2:50
Total length:			12:10 29:09

The original UK edition LP added "Homeward Bound" (2:30) to the beginning of Side B, extending the side length to 13:30 and the total length to 31:39.

Bonus tracks (2001 CD reissue)
No.	Title	Writer(s)	Recorded	Length
12.	"Blues Run the Game"	Jackson C. Frank	December 21, 1965	2:55
13.	"Barbriallen" (Demo, previously unreleased)	Traditional	July 8, 1970	4:06
14.	"Rose of Aberdeen" (Demo, previously unreleased)	Traditional	July 8, 1970	2:02
15.	"Roving Gambler" (Demo, previously unreleased)	Traditional	July 8, 1970	3:03
Total length:				12:06 41:15

Tracks 1–12 Produced by Bob Johnston, Tracks 13–15 Produced by Paul Simon, Art Garfunkel & Roy Halee

== Personnel ==
- Paul Simon – vocals, guitar
- Art Garfunkel – vocals
- Fred Carter Jr., Glen Campbell, Joe South – guitar
- Larry Knechtel – keyboards
- Joe Osborn – bass guitar
- Hal Blaine – drums
- Bob Johnston – producer

Sounds of Silence was recorded in April, June and December 1965 at CBS Studios in New York City, New York and Los Angeles, California.

"The Sound of Silence" (electric overdubs) personnel

- Al Gorgoni, Vinnie Bell – guitar
- Bob Bushnell – bass guitar
- Bobby Gregg – drums

"The Sound of Silence" overdubs were recorded at Columbia's "Studio A" at 799 Seventh Avenue near 52nd Street by Columbia Records staff producer Tom Wilson on July 22, 1965. Neither Paul Simon nor Art Garfunkel were aware of the session or the plan to release an electric remix of the song until after the overdubs had been recorded.

== Notes ==
- English singer-songwriter Billy Bragg lifted the opening lines of "Leaves That Are Green" ("I was 21 years when I wrote this song/I'm 22 now, but I won't be for long") for his song "A New England", which appeared on Bragg's 1983 EP Life's a Riot with Spy vs Spy. These same lyrics can be found in the Kirsty MacColl version of this song. Released as a cover in 1984, the song was MacColl's biggest solo hit, reaching #7 in the UK and #8 in Ireland.
- The Tremeloes' recording of "Blessed" became their 1966 "solo debut" single (without Brian Poole).
- Them recorded "Richard Cory" as a single in 1966. Wings (with Denny Laine on lead vocals) covered "Richard Cory" on their 1976 live triple album Wings over America.
- Nancy Wilson (of Heart) performs a cover of "Kathy's Song" on her 1999 album Live from McCabe's Guitar Shop.
- Eva Cassidy covered "Kathy's Song" on her 2000 CD Time After Time, released four years after her death.
- "Somewhere They Can't Find Me" is essentially a reworking of the title track of the duo's first album, Wednesday Morning, 3 A.M. It was recorded along with "We've Got a Groovy Thing Goin'" a few months before producer Tom Wilson dubbed electric instruments on "Sounds of Silence". The recurring descending bass line in the track as well as its introductory guitar riff were borrowed from Davey Graham's acoustic guitar piece "Anji", a cover of which follows on the album. (The melody line of the chorus in "We've Got a Groovy Thing Goin'" shows a similarity to a riff heard within the Bert Jansch version of Graham's piece, as well as the Sounds of Silence version; the line is similar to the theme in "Work Song" by Nat Adderley.)
- The song "Richard Cory" was based on a poem with the same title by Edwin Arlington Robinson. The chorus, however, is entirely of Simon's composition.
- The song "April Come She Will" bears structural resemblance to a traditional English rhyme, "Cuckoo, cuckoo, what do you do?", a phenology of the common cuckoo from April through September.

== Charts ==
Chart (1966)	Peak position
UK Albums Chart	13
US Album Charts	21
Chart (1970)	Peak position
Spanish Albums Chart	2
