= Bookends (album) =

1968 studio album by Simon & Garfunkel

Studio album by Simon & Garfunkel
- Released: April 3, 1968
- Recorded: September 1966; January 1967; June 1967; October 1967 – March 1968
- Studios: Columbia 52nd Street, New York City
- Genre: Folk rock
- Length: 29:17 (Original LP), 33:45 (CD w/ bonus tracks)
- Label: Columbia
- Producers: Paul Simon; Art Garfunkel; Roy Halee

Simon & Garfunkel chronology
The Graduate (1968)	Bookends (1968)	Bridge over Troubled Water (1970)

Singles from Bookends
- 1. "Mrs. Robinson" Released: April 1968

Bookends is the fourth studio album by the American folk rock duo Simon & Garfunkel. Produced by Paul Simon, Art Garfunkel and Roy Halee, the album was released on April 3, 1968, in the United States by Columbia Records. The duo had risen to fame two years prior with the albums Sounds of Silence and Parsley, Sage, Rosemary and Thyme and the soundtrack album for the 1967 film The Graduate.

Bookends is a concept album that explores a life journey from childhood to old age. Side one of the album marks successive stages in life, the theme serving as bookends to the life cycle. Side two largely consists of previously released singles and of unused material for The Graduate soundtrack. Simon's lyrics concern youth, disillusionment, relationships, old age, and mortality. Much of the material was crafted alongside producer John Simon (no relation), who joined the recording when Paul Simon suffered from writer's block. The album was recorded gradually over the period of a year, with production speeding up around the later months of 1967.

Initial sales for Bookends were substantial in the US, and the album produced the number-one single "Mrs. Robinson". The album sold well in the US and in the United Kingdom, where it peaked at number one. Bookends was considered a breakthrough for the duo, placing them on the same level as artists such as Aretha Franklin, The Beatles, Bob Dylan, and The Rolling Stones at the forefront of the countercultural movement in the 1960s. The album has continued to receive critical acclaim and is often debated by critics as to whether it or Bridge over Troubled Water is Simon & Garfunkel's best album.

== Background ==
Simon & Garfunkel first became prominent on American radio in 1965 with their record "The Sound of Silence", which became a hit during a period in which the duo had broken up due to the failure of their debut album, Wednesday Morning, 3 A.M. (1964). Following another release, Sounds of Silence (1966), the duo recorded and released Parsley, Sage, Rosemary and Thyme (1966), which brought new critical and commercial success to the duo. Simon, then 25, felt he had finally "made it" into an upper echelon of rock and roll, while most importantly retaining artistic integrity ("making him spiritually closer to Bob Dylan than to, say, Bobby Darin", wrote biographer Marc Eliot). The duo chose William Morris as their booking agency after a recommendation from Wally Amos, a mutual friend through their producer, Tom Wilson.

During the sessions for Parsley, the duo cut "A Hazy Shade of Winter" and decided to release it as a single then, where it peaked at number 13 on the national charts. Similarly, they recorded "At the Zoo" for single release in early 1967 (it charted lower, at number 16). Simon began work for Bookends around this time, noting to a writer at High Fidelity that "I'm not interested in singles anymore". He had hit a dry spell in his writing, which led to no Simon & Garfunkel album on the horizon for 1967. Artists at the time were expected to release two, perhaps three albums each year and the lack of productivity from the duo worried executives at Columbia Records. Amid concerns for Simon's idleness, Columbia Records chairman Clive Davis arranged for up-and-coming record producer John Simon to kick-start the recording. Simon was distrustful of "suits" at the label; on one occasion, he and Garfunkel brought a tape recorder into a meeting with Davis, who was giving a "fatherly talk" on speeding up production, in order to laugh at it later.

Meanwhile, director Mike Nichols, then filming The Graduate, had become fascinated with the duo's past two efforts, listening to them nonstop before and after filming. After two weeks of this obsession, he met with Clive Davis to ask for permission to license Simon & Garfunkel music for his film. Davis viewed it as a perfect fit and envisioned a best-selling soundtrack album. Simon was not as immediately receptive, viewing movies akin to "selling out", creating a damper on his artistic integrity. However, after meeting Nichols and becoming impressed by his wit and the script, he agreed to write at least one or two new songs for the film. Leonard Hirshan, a powerful agent at William Morris, negotiated a deal that paid Simon $25,000 (US$231,459 in 2025 dollars) to submit three songs to Nichols and producer Lawrence Turman. Several weeks later, Simon re-emerged with two new tracks, "Punky's Dilemma" and "Overs", neither of which Nichols was particularly taken with. The duo offered another new song, which later became "Mrs. Robinson", that was not as developed. Nichols loved it.

== Recording and production ==
"Being in the studio and making records in the sixties, I can tell you, it was very uncorporate. It was highly spirited. It was kids at play. It was just a wonder that you were allowed to do this, that two middle-class kids can sign a contract, rehearse and get their talent into the studio, and then find that the entire distribution network is waiting to put out their products. It was wonderfully simple, sincere, and uncynical."

— Art Garfunkel on the recording process

Bookends was recorded sporadically from 1966 to 1968. John Simon's first session with the group was for "Fakin' It" in June 1967. The duo were signed under an older contract that specified that the label pay for sessions ("As a folk duo, how much could recording costs be?" said John Simon). Simon & Garfunkel took advantage of this indulgence, hiring viola and brass players, as well as percussionists. When the viola players arrived, the duo were so intrigued with the sound of the musicians tuning their instruments before recording that they spent nearly all night (at Columbia's expense) trying to find the random sound.

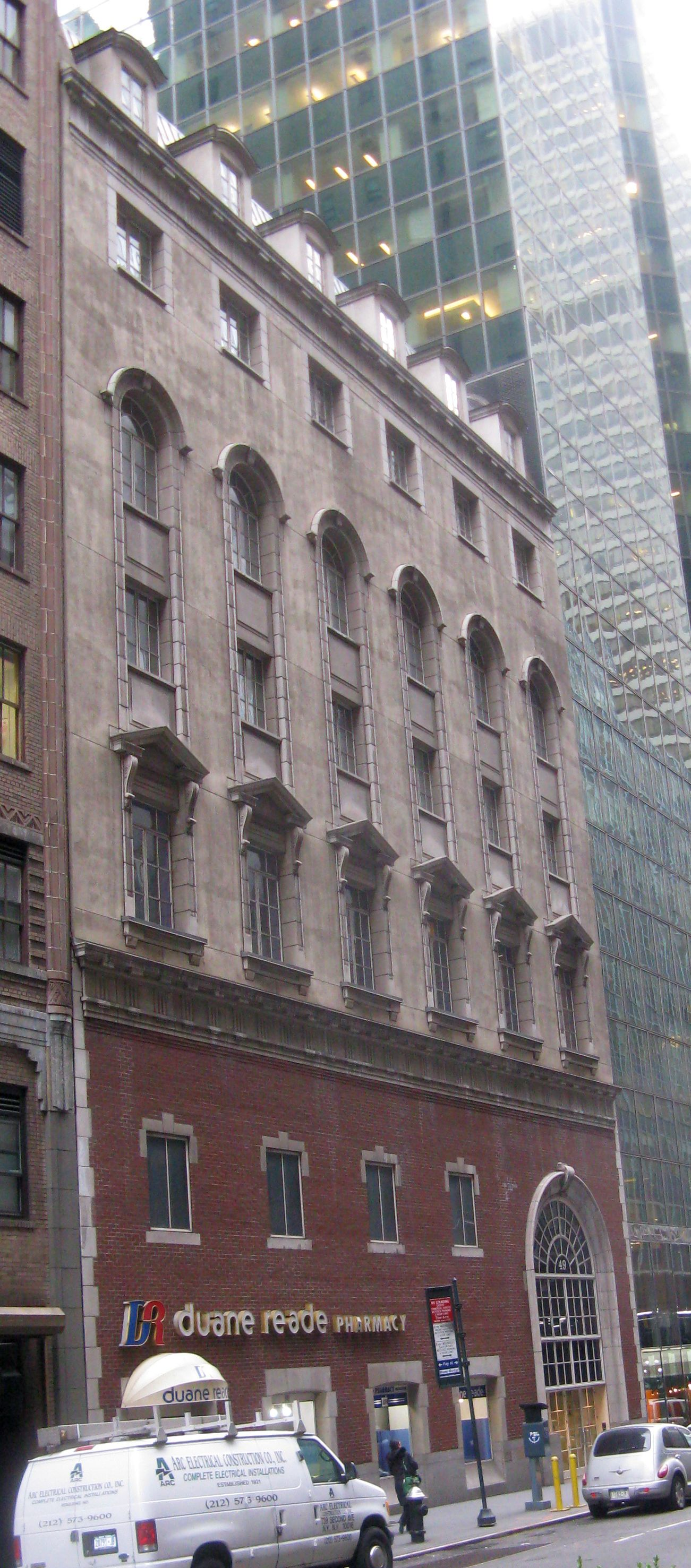
Bookends was recorded at Columbia's Studio B at the CBS Studio Building in Manhattan.

The record's brevity reflects its concise and perfectionistic production. The team spent over 50 studio hours recording "Punky's Dilemma", for example, and re-recorded vocal parts, sometimes note by note, until they were satisfied. Simon paid close attention to his vocal takes, and he strived to get each line perfect. He took a bigger role in all aspects of production, and harmonies for which the band was famous gradually disappeared in favor of songs sung solo by each member. Although the album had been planned long in advance, work did not begin in earnest until the late months of 1967.

John Simon's work with the duo produced several tracks that ended up on Bookends, such as "Punky's Dilemma", "Save the Life of My Child", and "Overs". In October 1967, Morgan Ames, writer for High Fidelity magazine, attended a recording session with the duo, Simon, Halee and an assistant engineer at Columbia's recording studio on 52nd Street in New York City. Her observations were reported in the November edition of the magazine:

The team's working relationship is built upon listening to each other, asking advice, taking it, building each other's morale. Though it's obvious they enjoy working with John Simon, the last word seems to come from one partner to the other [...] Ideas are tried, accepted, rejected. Time passes. Too much time. Too little headway [...] "Punky's Dilemma" is put aside for the moment and Simon begins work on the title song for the new album, Bookends.

Work on Bookends slowed by the beginning of the new year, with John Simon's departure from Columbia. The duo and Halee completed production themselves, recording "America" on February 1, the final version of "Mrs. Robinson" on February 2, and "Old Friends" and the closing "Bookends Theme" on March 8. Simon felt the album "had the most use of the studio" of all of the duo's albums.

== Composition ==
=== Music ===
"Old Friends"
"Old Friends" is a meditation on aging. The song makes use of an orchestra, which builds in intensity over the course of the song.

The "Bookends Theme" that opens and closes side one is played on the acoustic guitar, with no additional instruments. An audio sample of the band's first hit, "The Sound of Silence", softly plays during a cacophony of sounds near the end of the second track, "Save the Life of My Child". John Simon, who was credited with production assistance on the song, created the bassline by playing a Moog synthesizer with help from Robert Moog himself. James Bennighof, author of The Words and Music of Paul Simon, finds that "textural elements are variously supported by a churning groove, percussive, and distorted electronic sounds" that complement the song's subject matter, suicide suburban youth. The song "America" explores the search of meaning in the life of a young adult. "Overs" explores a more jazz-oriented style, with a larger selection of chords and looser form than the group's previous styles.

"Voices of Old People" is a sound collage, and was recorded on tape by Garfunkel at the United Home for Aged Hebrews in New Rochelle, New York, and the California Home for the Aged at Reseda. The collection of audio recordings of the elderly find them musing on treasured photographs, illness and living conditions. In "Old Friends", the title generally conveys the introduction or ending of sections through repetition, and the song builds upon a "rather loose formal structure" that at first includes an acoustic guitar and soft mood. An additional element is introduced midway through the track: an orchestral arrangement conducted by Jimmie Haskell, dominated by strings and xylophone notes. Horns and other instruments are added when the duo cease singing, creating a turbulence that builds to a single high, sustained note on the strings. The song then segues into the final song of side one, the reprise of the "Bookends Theme".

Side two consists of miscellaneous unrelated songs unused for The Graduate, with many possessing a more rock-based sound than the unified folk songs that precede it. Simon felt the album's second side was composed of throwaway tracks: "They didn't mean a lot. They weren't well recorded." In "Fakin' It", melodies are occasionally deleted to suit lyrics, but the song generally follows a similar chord structure and melodic outline over a "funky rock beat" that sonically references the Beatles' "Tomorrow Never Knows". "Punky's Dilemma" is breezy and minimal musically, with a soft jazz-style percussion and seemingly improvised guitar lines dominated by major and minor seventh chords. "Mrs. Robinson" opens with an "instantly recognizable" pop rock guitar hook that carries throughout the track. The first verse consists only of syllables—"dee-dee-dee" and "doo-doo-doo"—that form stable harmonic foundation. The inclusion of the meaningless syllables arises from the unfinished nature of the song when pitched to director Mike Nichols, who particularly liked the verse. "A Hazy Shade of Winter" follows a more rock-tinged sound, with a fairly straightforward verse-refrain structure. "At the Zoo" uses a rock groove that settles into the key of G major.

=== Lyrics ===
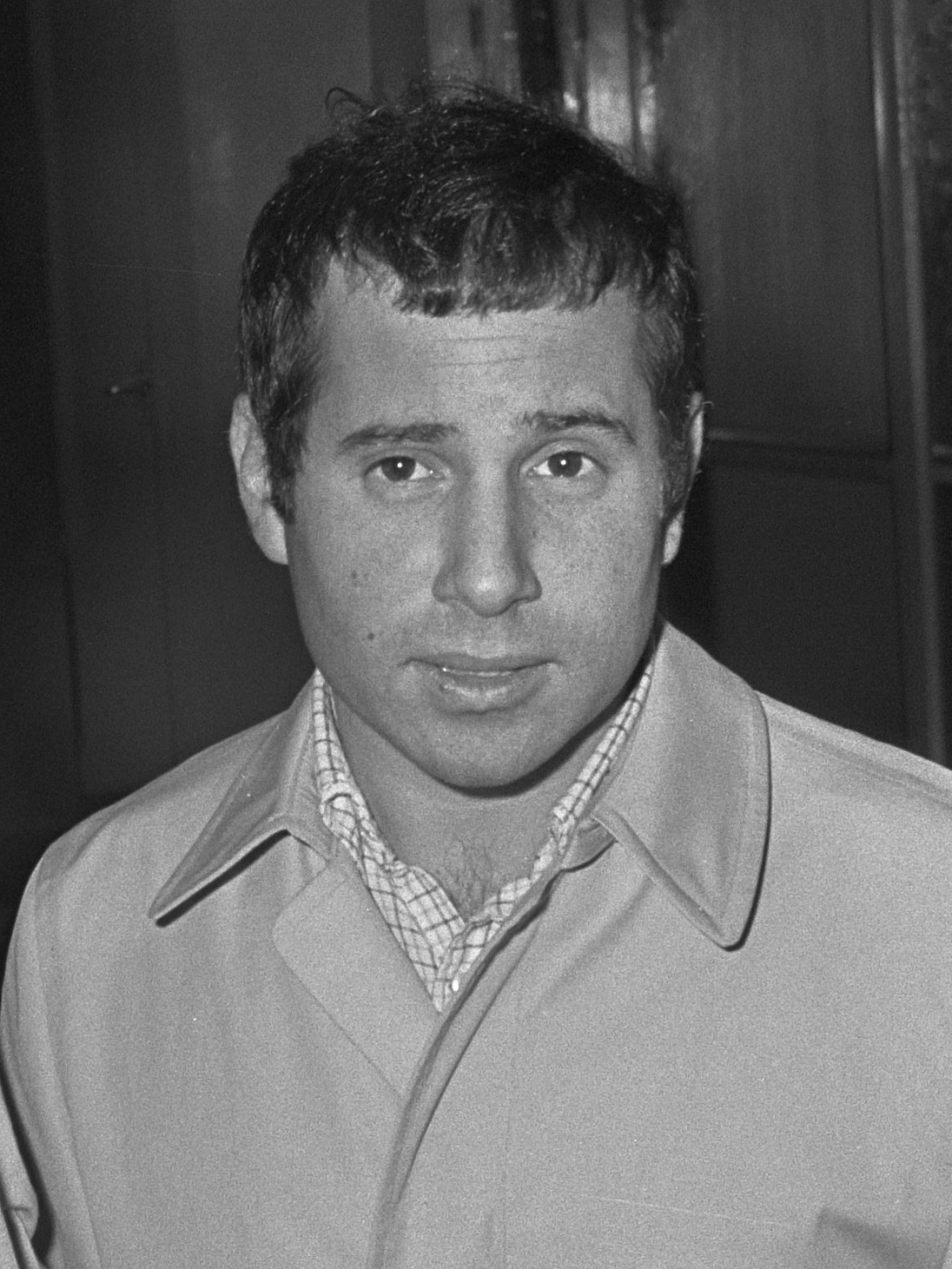
Paul Simon, the album's primary songwriter, seen here in 1966.

According to disc jockey and author Pete Fornatale, the album perhaps shares thematic qualities with another concept album, the Beatles' Sgt. Pepper's Lonely Hearts Club Band, released ten months prior. He equates "At the Zoo" and "Old Friends" to "Being for the Benefit of Mr. Kite!" and "When I'm Sixty-Four", respectively. Fornatale notes, however, that while Sgt. Pepper was notable for sonically colorful, psychedelic shapes, Bookends is starkly contrasted by moody, "black-and-white and gray" sounds. While concept albums were fairly common among rock groups at this time—such as The Rolling Stones' Their Satanic Majesties Request, The Byrds' Sweetheart of the Rodeo and Iron Butterfly's In-a-Gadda-Da-Vida—Bookends enjoyed massive success with the format not unlike the Beatles nearly one year before. Garfunkel confirmed the influence of Sgt. Pepper's in a 2015 interview, commenting, "We were terribly impressed, and that shone a light on the path that led to Bookends." Simon often smoked hashish when writing, and he was convinced he must be high to write. He felt the drug had a negative effect and caused him to "retreat more into myself". He often found himself alone while on tour, and his thoughts grew dark during these times. He attributed "the pain that comes out in some of the songs is due to the exaggeration of being high."

Bookends contains many of Paul Simon's major themes, including "youth, alienation, life, love, disillusionment, relationships, old age, and mortality". Simon's work on Bookends is loosely autobiographical, designed to function as both a personal and artistic statement. Simon, "feeling especially auteurist in the Dylan style of the day", had planned out the album's concept before he began writing, telling Garfunkel "I'm going to start writing a whole side of an album—a cycle of songs. I want the early ones to be about youth and the last song to be about old age, and I want the feel of each song to fit." Bookends, originally released primarily as a vinyl LP, opens and closes side one of the disc with the "Bookends Theme", a brief acoustic piece (once compared to the work of English rock band the Moody Blues) that evokes "a time of innocence". "Save the Life of My Child" is a dramatic story involving drugs, violence and a mother-and-child relationship. According to James Bennighof, the song "deals with individual crises in crowded urban settings, along with references to larger societal forces and at least a hint of some transcendent perspective". The song crossfades into "America", which follows two young lovers—"an apparently impromptu romantic traveling alliance"—as they board a Greyhound bus "to look for America". It is a protest song that "creates a cinematic vista that tells of the singer's search for a literal and physical America that seems to have disappeared, along with the country's beauty and ideals". "Overs" includes themes regarding the disintegration of love and marriage. "Old Friends" paints a portrait of two old men reminiscing on the years of their youth. The two men "sit on a park bench like bookends", and ponder how strange it feels to be nearing the end of their lifetimes. The song is joined with the "Bookends Theme", this time with vocal accompaniment from the duo. The piece closes the entire suite with the "resigned admonition" to "Preserve your memories / They're all that's left you".

"Fakin' It" opens side two and finds the protagonist mulling over his insecurities and shortcomings. It has been suggested that "Fakin' It" may be an allegory for Simon's relationship with Art Garfunkel. "Punky's Dilemma" employs breakfast-food images to lampoon Hollywood and the film industry. It improbably takes an "abrupt left turn" in its third verse, when the singer begins to fantasize himself an admired soldier. "Mrs. Robinson" collects wide-ranging images to address social milieu, with a constant reassurance that Jesus loves the eponymous character, God will bless her, and heaven will welcome her. The song includes a famous reference to athlete Joe DiMaggio of the New York Yankees, one of Simon's favorite baseball teams. It also features an explicit homage to the Beatles, with Simon uttering the meaningless phrase "coo-coo-ca-choo" based on the line "Goo goo g'joob", sung by John Lennon in "I Am the Walrus". "A Hazy Shade of Winter" is an older track that dates back to Simon's days in England in 1965. The song follows a hopeless poet, with "manuscripts of unpublished rhyme", unsure of his achievements in life. In sharp contrast, the whimsical, Orwellian "At the Zoo" both concludes the album and what Simon described as the "cycle of life". The song indicates that the personalities of certain zoo animals may represent particular walks of people. The song was originally intended as a possible children's book. According to rock journalist Bud Scoppa, "the record is a meditation on the passage of life and the psychological impact of life's irreversible, ever-accumulating losses". The song cycle also describes the life and death of the romantic ideal of the American Dream.

== Release and commercial performance ==
The original release of Bookends included this poster, which Columbia chairman Clive Davis used to justify increasing the price of the LP.

Prior to the release of the album, the band helped put together, and performed at, the Monterey Pop Festival. "Fakin' It" was issued as a single that summer, but the duo was much more focused on the rising FM format, which played album cuts. On the label of the original 45 RPM single, the 3:14-long "Fakin' It" was shown as having a run time of "2:74", to try to get past radio programmers who were still strictly applying the "under 3 minutes" pop single formula. "Fakin' It" had only modest success on AM radio. In January 1968, the duo appeared on a Kraft Music Hall special, Three for Tonight, performing ten songs largely culled from their third album. Richard Avedon, regarded then as one of the best photographers, was commissioned to shoot the album cover. When viewed closely, one can see Avedon's reflection in Simon's irises.

Bookends was released by Columbia Records on April 3, 1968. In a historical context, that was just 24 hours before the assassination of Martin Luther King Jr., which spurred nationwide outrage and riots. Fornatale opines that the album served as "comfort food" during rather tumultuous times within the nation. The album debuted on the Billboard Pop Album Chart in the issue dated April 27, 1968, climbing to number one and staying at that position for seven non-consecutive weeks, remaining on the chart for a total of 66 weeks. Bookends received such heavy orders weeks in advance of its release that Columbia was able to apply for award certification before copies had left the warehouse, a fact that was touted in magazine ads. The record became the duo's best-selling album to date. It fed off the buzz created by the release of The Graduate soundtrack album ten weeks earlier, creating an initial combined sales figure of over five million units. In the United Kingdom, Bookends was a number one hit. The album charted highly in both Australia and France, peaking in both countries at number three.

The duo had a complicated relationship with Davis; Simon was particularly outraged when Davis suggested raising the list price of Bookends to $5.79 (US$54 in 2025 dollars), one dollar above the standard retail price. Davis explained that including a large poster with each copy made it necessary to charge an extra dollar to cover the cost. Simon scoffed and viewed it as charging a premium on "what was sure to be that year's best-selling Columbia album". According to biographer Marc Eliot, Davis was "offended by what he perceived as their lack of gratitude for what he believed was his role in turning them into superstars". Rather than implement Davis' price increase plan, Simon & Garfunkel signed a contract extension with Columbia that guaranteed them a higher royalty rate.

== Critical reception ==
Reviews of Bookends upon its release in 1968 were largely positive. Allen Evans of the British publication New Musical Express (NME) gave the record four out of five stars and called it "inspiring, descriptive music", while noting the album is "Imaginative and at times confusing to know what the composer is getting at, if anything." Rival newspaper Melody Maker did not use a ratings system, but called Bookends a "thoughtful, clever and well-produced album". Reviewer Chris Welch criticized the songs as "not particularly tuneful", but performed with "Beatles fervour and Beatles conviction", praising the lyricism, opining that "The words capture part of America today, a lot of its sickness and tragedy." In the US, Rolling Stone reviewer Arthur Schmidt wrote that "The music is, for me, questionable, but I've always found their music questionable. It is nice enough, and I admit to liking it, but it exudes a sense of process, and it is slick, and nothing too much happens."

Later reviews were more positive. "In just over 29 minutes, Bookends is stunning in its vision of a bewildered America in search of itself", said AllMusic writer Thom Jurek, who gave it five stars out of five. Pitchfork Media's Stephen M. Deusner called Bookends the moment in which the duo "were settling into themselves, losing their folk revival pretensions and emphasizing quirky production techniques to match their soaring vocals". The A.V. Club called it the group's "most musically and conceptually daring album".

=== Accolades ===
"Mrs. Robinson" became the first rock and roll song to win Record of the Year at the 11th Annual Grammy Awards in 1969; it was also afforded the honor of Best Contemporary Pop Performance by a Duo or Group.

In 2000, Bookends was voted number 338 in Colin Larkin's All Time Top 1000 Albums.

Publication	Country	Accolade	Year	Rank
Robert Dimery	US	1001 Albums You Must Hear Before You Die	2005	*
Rolling Stone	US	The 500 Greatest Albums of All Time	2012	234
Rolling Stone	US	The Top 25 Rock & Roll Albums of the '60s	1990	21
* denotes an unranked list

== Legacy ==
The album, alongside The Graduate soundtrack, propelled Simon & Garfunkel to become the biggest rock duo in the world. Simon was approached by numerous film producers who wished him to write music for their films or license a track; he turned down Franco Zeffirelli, who was preparing to film Brother Sun, Sister Moon, and John Schlesinger, who likewise was readying to shoot Midnight Cowboy. In addition to Hollywood proposals, producers from the Broadway show Jimmy Shine (starring Simon's friend Dustin Hoffman, also the lead in Midnight Cowboy) asked for two original songs and Simon declined. He eventually paired with Leonard Bernstein, with whom he collaborated for a short time on a sacred mass (he eventually withdrew from the project, "finding it perhaps too far afield from his comfort zone").

Disc jockey and author Pete Fornatale writes that Bookends represents "a once-in-a-career convergence of musical, personal, and societal forces that placed Simon & Garfunkel squarely at the center of the cultural zeitgeist of the sixties". Rolling Stone credited the record with striking a chord among lonely, adrift young adults near the end of the decade, writing that a lyric in "A Hazy Shade of Winter"—"Time, time, time, see what’s become of me..."—"defined the moment for a generation on the edge of adulthood". Many viewed Bookends as the band's most accomplished work at the time, a breakthrough in production and songwriting. "Bookends was our first serious piece of work, I'd say", said Simon in a 1984 interview with Playboy.

In 2010, "All gone to look for America"—a reference to a line from the song "America"—began appearing spray-painted on vacant buildings and abandoned factories in the town of Saginaw, Michigan, which is mentioned in the song. A loose group of artists, who eventually became known as "Paint Saginaw", began duplicating the phrase after the city's population had dwindled vastly, noting that the song now encapsulated a sense of nostalgia for a bygone era among the city's residents.

"America" was also featured in an eponymously-titled television advertisement for the presidential campaign of Bernie Sanders during the 2016 Democratic Party presidential primaries. The campaign sought permission to use it from Paul Simon and Art Garfunkel themselves, who both agreed. Garfunkel stated that he was a supporter of Sanders and his campaign, and that the usage of "America" did not take away from the song's original premise.

Bookends was the last Simon & Garfunkel album to be mixed in separate mono and stereo mixes, as manufacturing of mono LP's alongside concurrent stereo issues was in the final stages of being discontinued in 1968. The mono mix was released as a promo issue to radio stations and given a very limited run for commercial sale. It was out-of-print very soon after release, and as of January 2017, it has yet to see a digital re-release.

== Track listing ==
All tracks are written by Paul Simon, except "Voices of Old People" by Art Garfunkel.

Side one
No.	Title	Recorded	Length
1.	"Bookends Theme" (instrumental)	March 8, 1968	0:29
2.	"Save the Life of My Child"	December 14, 1967	2:50
3.	"America"	February 1, 1968	3:34
4.	"Overs"	October 16, 1967	2:14
5.	"Voices of Old People"	February 6, 1968	2:06
6.	"Old Friends"	March 8, 1968	2:36
7.	"Bookends Theme"	March 8, 1968	1:19
Total length:			15:08

Side two
No.	Title	Recorded	Length
1.	"Fakin' It"	June 1967	3:15
2.	"Punky's Dilemma"	October 5, 1967	2:12
3.	"Mrs. Robinson" (from the motion picture The Graduate)	February 2, 1968	4:02
4.	"A Hazy Shade of Winter"	September 7, 1966	2:17
5.	"At the Zoo"	January 8, 1967	2:23
Total length:			14:09 29:17

Bonus tracks (2001 CD reissue)
No.	Title	Recorded	Length
13.	"You Don't Know Where Your Interest Lies"	June 14, 1967	2:18
14.	"Old Friends" (demo, previously unreleased)	1968	2:10
Total length:			4:28 33:45

== Personnel ==
Credits for Bookends adapted from AllMusic. Track numbers refer to CD and digital releases.

- Paul Simon – vocals, guitar
- Art Garfunkel – vocals, tapes, percussion

Additional musicians

- Hal Blaine – drums, percussion
- Joe Osborn – bass guitar
- Larry Knechtel – piano, keyboards, bass guitar on "Mrs Robinson"
- John Simon – synthesizer on "Save the Life of My Child"

Production

- Simon & Garfunkel – producers (tracks: 1, 3, 5–7, 10, 12)
- Roy Halee – producer (tracks: 1, 3, 5–7 & 10), recording engineer
- John Simon – production assistant on "Save the Life of My Child", "Overs", "Fakin' It" & "Punky's Dilemma"
- Bob Johnston – production assistant on "A Hazy Shade of Winter" & "At the Zoo", production
- Jimmie Haskell – arranger, arrangement preparation
- Richard Avedon – cover photography

== Charts and certifications ==
=== Weekly charts ===
Chart (1968)	Peak; position
Australian Albums (ARIA)	3
Canada RPM	5
French Albums (SNEP)	3
German Albums (Offizielle Top 100)	40
UK Albums (Official Charts)	1
US Billboard 200	1

=== Certifications ===
Region	Certification	Certified units/sales
United Kingdom (BPI)	Gold	100,000^{‡}
United States (RIAA)	2× Platinum	2,000,000^{^}
^{^} Shipments figures based on certification alone.^{‡} Sales+streaming figures based on certification alone.

== Notes ==
=== Sources ===
- Bennighof, James (2007). The Words and Music of Paul Simon. Greenwood Publishing Group. ISBN 978-0-275-99163-0.
- Eliot, Marc (2010). Paul Simon: A Life. John Wiley and Sons. ISBN 978-0-470-43363-8.
- Fornatale, Pete (2007). Simon and Garfunkel's Bookends. Rodale. ISBN 978-1-59486-427-8.
