= For Emily, Whenever I May Find Her =

1966 song by Simon & Garfunkel

Song by Simon & Garfunkel

from the album Parsley, Sage, Rosemary and Thyme
- Recorded: August 22, 1966
- Genre: Folk rock
- Length: 2:07
- Label: Columbia
- Songwriter: Paul Simon
- Producer: Bob Johnston

"For Emily, Whenever I May Find Her (Live)"

Single by Simon & Garfunkel

from the album Simon and Garfunkel's Greatest Hits
- B-side: "America"
- Released: August 10, 1972
- Genre: Folk rock
- Length: 2:25
- Label: Columbia
- Songwriter: Paul Simon
- Producers: Paul Simon; Art Garfunkel; Roy Halee

Simon & Garfunkel singles chronology
"The 59th Street Bridge Song (Feelin' Groovy)" (1971)	"For Emily, Whenever I May Find Her (Live)" (1972)	"America" (1972)

"For Emily, Whenever I May Find Her" is a song written by Paul Simon and recorded by American music duo Simon & Garfunkel on their third studio album, Parsley, Sage, Rosemary and Thyme (1966). It is sung solely by Art Garfunkel, and consists mainly of his vocals with heavy reverb and a 12-string acoustic guitar. The lyrics concern finding a lover, although Simon once characterized the subject matter as being about a "belief", rather than about a specific individual.

First issued as a single as the B-side of "A Hazy Shade of Winter" (1966), the song was later reissued in live form in 1972 to promote the release of the compilation album Simon and Garfunkel's Greatest Hits. The track reached number 53 on the Billboard Hot 100 in July 1972. Afterwards, the song was switched to the B-side of the single with “America” as the A-side and re-entered the charts in November 1972. It has been covered numerous times by many notable artists, and remains a staple of Art Garfunkel's live sets. He regards it as one of the most challenging songs to perform.

== Background ==
"For Emily, Whenever I May Find Her" has sometimes been thought to be named after poet Emily Dickinson, who is referenced in another song on the record, "The Dangling Conversation". It has also been considered to be inspired by Simon's relationship with Kathy Chitty, which is forefront in "America". "For Emily" is more lyrically comparable with "Homeward Bound" and "Kathy’s Song" in that it details finding solace in a lover.

While other songs, such as "The Sound of Silence", had taken months for Simon to complete writing, others, such as "For Emily", were written in a single night. In their 1968 appearance on Kraft Music Hall, Simon explained that "For Emily" is not about an imaginary girl Emily, but about a belief, while the song "Overs" (from the album Bookends) is about the loss of that belief.

The live recording of the song released as a single in August 1972 peaked at number 53 on the Billboard Hot 100 and spent seven weeks on the chart.

== Composition ==
"For Emily, Whenever I May Find Her" has been called an "ethereal showpiece for [Art] Garfunkel", containing a "mystical quality, created not only by the timbre of the guitar, but also by some of the rhythmic and pitch elements." The song's production is simple, and consists mainly of a 12-string acoustic guitar played by Simon and various studio techniques, such as reverberation and unison overdubs on the vocals.

The song is composed in the key of F major, and is played by Paul Simon with the capo on 3rd fret, which means the harmonies are in relative D. The song barely lasts two minutes, covering five verses. The first three employ "ornate imagery to tell of his dream of finding his lover", the fourth is an instrumental interlude, and the fifth finds the protagonist awakening to find his lover with him. The melody consists of five brief phrases, with the first three being descending series of thirds. "For Emily, Whenever I May Find Her" draws on the Mixolydian scale, which is identical to the major scale but with its seventh step lowered. James Bennighof, in his book The Words and Music of Paul Simon, considers the composition exceptionally flexible in regard to its harmonic and melodic scheme: "Simon feels free to vary the syllable and accent pattern of the text lines within the verses, and he adjusts the rhythms and pitches in order to accommodate these alterations."

Within the album's sequence, the song follows "A Simple Desultory Philippic (or How I Was Robert McNamara'd into Submission)", which is considerably different in tone: a satirical rant regarding pop culture. This sharp contrast between successive songs is a theme carried throughout Parsley, Sage, Rosemary and Thyme.

== Reception ==
In 2014, a Rolling Stone readers poll ranked it among the duo's best compositions, with the magazine declaring, "Over the years, fans have recognized it as one of the duo's sweetest love songs."

Cash Box described the original studio version as "a soft ballad". Record World said it has "one of S & G's loveliest lyrics and heart-stopping melodies."

== Cover versions ==
The song has been covered by numerous artists, including Glenn Yarbrough (as the title track of his 1967 album For Emily, Whenever I May Find Her), Johnny Rivers (on his 1967 album Rewind), The Arbors (on their 1968 album The Arbors Featuring I Can't Quit Her - The Letter), Ricky Nelson (on his 1969 album Perspective), Paul Desmond (on his 1969 album Bridge over Troubled Water), Cliff Richard (on his 1969 album Sincerely Cliff), David Essex (on his 1973 album Rock On), John Frusciante (at Red Hot Chili Peppers shows), Overwhelming Colorfast (on their 1992 EP Bender) and The Czars (on their 2006 album Sorry I Made You Cry). Paul's son Harper used some lines from the song on his "Berkeley Girl". Lani Hall (on her 1972 album Sun Down Lady) sings the song as "Wherever I May Find Him". It is sung a cappella.

== Chart positions ==
=== Weekly charts ===
Chart (1972)	Peak position
US Billboard Hot 100	53

== Bibliography ==
- Bennighof, James (2007). The Words and Music of Paul Simon. Greenwood Publishing Group. ISBN 978-0-275-99163-0.
