= At the Zoo =

- US picture sleeve

Single by Simon & Garfunkel
- B-side: "The 59th Street Bridge Song (Feelin' Groovy)"
- Released: February 27, 1967
- Recorded: January 8, 1967
- Genre: Folk rock
- Length: 2:21
- Label: Columbia
- Songwriter: Paul Simon
- Producers: Simon and Garfunkel; Bob Johnston

Simon & Garfunkel singles chronology
"A Hazy Shade of Winter" (1966)	"At the Zoo" (1967)	"Fakin' It" (1967)

"At the Zoo" is one of Simon & Garfunkel's single releases in 1967. It is one of Paul Simon's many tributes to his hometown of New York City, and was written for the soundtrack of The Graduate, specifically the scene which takes place at the San Francisco Zoo. However, the song was not used in the film. It begins with Simon's short lyrical introduction in the key of A Major, but soon transitions to the key of G Major, being a whole step down from the beginning. The narrative tells the story of a trip to the Central Park Zoo; when the singer reaches the zoo, he anthropomorphizes the animals in various amusing ways. The song was licensed in advertisements for the Bronx Zoo, the San Francisco Zoo and the Oregon Zoo in the late 1970s.

== Reception ==
Billboard described the song as a "winner" with a "clever lyric and rhythm arrangement". Cash Box called the single a "bright and lively mover that’s bound to be a smash". Record World called it "strange" and "eerie" and said that "it rocks along with verve."

== Releases ==
"At the Zoo" was first released as a single in 1967, reaching number 16 on the Billboard Hot 100. After that, it was released on the following albums:

- Bookends (1968)
- The Simon and Garfunkel Collection: 17 of Their All-Time Greatest Recordings (1981)
- The Best of Simon and Garfunkel (1999)
- Tales from New York: The Very Best of Simon & Garfunkel (2000)

The song was also performed live by Simon and Garfunkel in the Old Friends: Live on Stage album in 2004, as part of a medley with "Baby Driver".

An alternate version with almost completely different lyrics is available on the bootleg The Alternate Bookends. These lyrics have nothing to do with a zoo, but rather speak of a musician's girlfriend having changed while he was on the road. The song begins, "Something tells me things have changed since I've been gone"; "Something tells me" is one of the few phrases that is still present in the released version.

== The book ==
In 1991, Paul Simon released a children's book titled At the Zoo (ISBN 0-385-41771-3) which combines the lyrics of the song with detailed illustrations by Valerie Michaut. To make this book "age-appropriate" for children, Simon made changes and additions, including identifying Rum as a beaver (because the original lyric states that "the zookeeper is very fond of rum") and giving the hamsters headlights (because they "turn on frequently").

== Chart performance ==
Chart (1967)	Peak position
US Billboard Hot 100	16
US Cashbox Top 100	15
