= Bookends (song) =

"Bookends Theme"

Song by Simon & Garfunkel

from the album Bookends
- Recorded: March 8, 1968
- Genre: Folk
- Length: 0:32; 1:19 (Reprise)
- Label: Columbia
- Songwriter: Paul Simon
- Producers: Paul Simon; Art Garfunkel; Roy Halee

"Bookends", also known as "Bookends Theme", is a song by American music duo Simon & Garfunkel from their fourth studio album, Bookends (1968). It appears twice on the track listing, as the first (shortened version) and last (known as the Reprise) songs on side one of the original vinyl LP. "Old Friends" and “Bookends” were placed on the B-side of the "Mrs. Robinson" single, issued on April 5, 1968, by Columbia Records. A "clean" version of "Bookends" (without the segued string from "Old Friends") was featured on Simon and Garfunkel's Greatest Hits.

== Composition ==
The "Bookends Theme" that opens and closes side one is played on the acoustic guitar, with no additional instruments. The song is a brief acoustic piece (once compared to English rock band the Moody Blues) that evokes "a time of innocence".

The “Bookends Theme (Reprise)” is preceded by "Old Friends", which segues into the song with a single high, sustained note on the strings. The “Bookends Theme (Reprise)” contains vocal accompaniment from the duo. "The text refers to the passage of time, and to memories of a loved one, and thus fittingly concludes the series of intervening songs, which address interpersonal relationships at times of life that progress from song to song," wrote James Bennighof, author of The Words and Music of Paul Simon. The piece closes the entire suite with the "resigned admonition" to "Preserve your memories / They're all that's left you."

== In popular culture ==
The song was used in the 2009 film (500) Days of Summer.

== Notes ==
=== Sources ===
- Bennighof, James (2007). The Words and Music of Paul Simon. Greenwood Publishing Group. ISBN 978-0-275-99163-0.
- Eliot, Marc (2010). Paul Simon: A Life. John Wiley and Sons. ISBN 978-0-470-43363-8.
- Fornatale, Pete (2007). Simon and Garfunkel's Bookends. Rodale. ISBN 978-1-59486-427-8.
