= Fakin' It (Simon & Garfunkel song) =

1967 song by Simon & Garfunkel

- Dutch picture sleeve

Single by Simon & Garfunkel
- B-side: "You Don't Know Where Your Interest Lies"
- Released: July 7, 1967
- Recorded: June 1967
- Genre: Folk rock; psychedelic folk
- Length: 3:14
- Label: Columbia
- Songwriter: Paul Simon
- Producers: Simon & Garfunkel; John Simon

Simon & Garfunkel singles chronology
"At the Zoo" (1967)	"Fakin' It" (1967)	"Scarborough Fair/Canticle" (1968)

"Fakin' It" is a song recorded by American music duo Simon & Garfunkel for their fourth studio album, Bookends (1968). The song was initially released only as a single on July 7, 1967, through Columbia Records. It was later compiled into the second half of Bookends.

The song's lyrics stem from Simon wondering about his occupation and life had he been born a century earlier as well as reflection on his insecurities, facing a situation akin to impostor syndrome. All the same, the dramatic interplay between the burden of said insecurities and a simultaneous air of outwardly cool confidence generate significant interest for the listener. Even after numerous listenings, due to the concealment of specifics the fertile ambiguity that permeates "Fakin' It" allows for both of the two competing interpretations (faking contentment with a mediocre situation, or faking competence in order to hold down a more favorable one?) to be plausible, probably even as disparate aspects of the same situation.

Musically, it features a spoken word piece by musician Beverley Martyn as a sort of cameo appearance. The song was a top-25 hit in the United States, peaking at number 23 on the Billboard Hot 100.

== Background ==
Shortly before production began in earnest on Simon & Garfunkel's fourth LP, Bookends, Paul Simon hit a dry spell in his writing. Amid concerns for Simon's idleness, Columbia Records chairman Clive Davis arranged for up-and-coming record producer John Simon to kick-start the recording.

His first session with the group was for "Fakin' It" in June 1967. The duo were signed under an older contract that specified the label pay for sessions ("As a folk duo, how much could recording costs be?" said John Simon). Simon & Garfunkel took advantage of this indulgence, hiring viola and brass players, as well as percussionists. When the viola players arrived, the duo were so taken with the sound of the musicians tuning their instruments before recording that they spent nearly all night (at Columbia's expense) trying to find the random sound.

== Composition ==
"Fakin' It"
The song contains a brief detour into spoken word before returning to music.

In "Fakin' It", melodies are occasionally deleted to suit lyrics, but the song generally follows a similar chord structure and melodic outline over a "funky rock beat" that sonically references the Beatles' "Tomorrow Never Knows". It opens with an "unearthly rhythmic sound" (that some critics felt owed a debt to the Beatles' "Strawberry Fields Forever") that was an example of Simon & Garfunkel's desire to push the limits of studio recording.

The central finger-style riff experiments with the home key of A, modulating from a sturdy, relaxed mixolydian modal foundation into a somber aeolian melancholy. This musical decision reminiscent of "Ode to Billie Joe" (1967) by Bobbie Gentry and even "I Dig Rock and Roll Music" (1967) by Peter, Paul and Mary can be seen to show the vulnerability inherent in Simon's message of uncertain self confidence.

The lyrics find the protagonist mulling over his insecurities and shortcomings. It has been suggested that "Fakin' It" may be an allegory for Simon's relationship with Art Garfunkel.

Near the middle of the song there is a brief spoken word vignette featuring a British woman entering a tailor shop and greeting the owner: "Good morning, Mr. Leitch. Have you had a busy day?" The woman performing was singer Beverley Martyn, who was friends with singer-songwriter Donovan. Donovan's last name is Leitch, hence the name's use in the song. Simon knew Martyn from his days living in England, and she was often around the duo's circle of friends at the time of recording.

The lines about being a tailor arose from an occasion when Simon was wondering what his occupation would be had he been born a century earlier. "During some hashish reverie I was thinking to myself, 'I'm really in a weird position. I earn my living by writing songs and singing songs. It's only today that this could happen,'" he explained. He settled on the idea that he may have been a tailor, and likely from Vienna or Hungary, as that is where his ancestors migrated from. Simon's father revealed to him later that, coincidentally, his grandfather was a tailor also named Paul from Vienna.

== Release ==
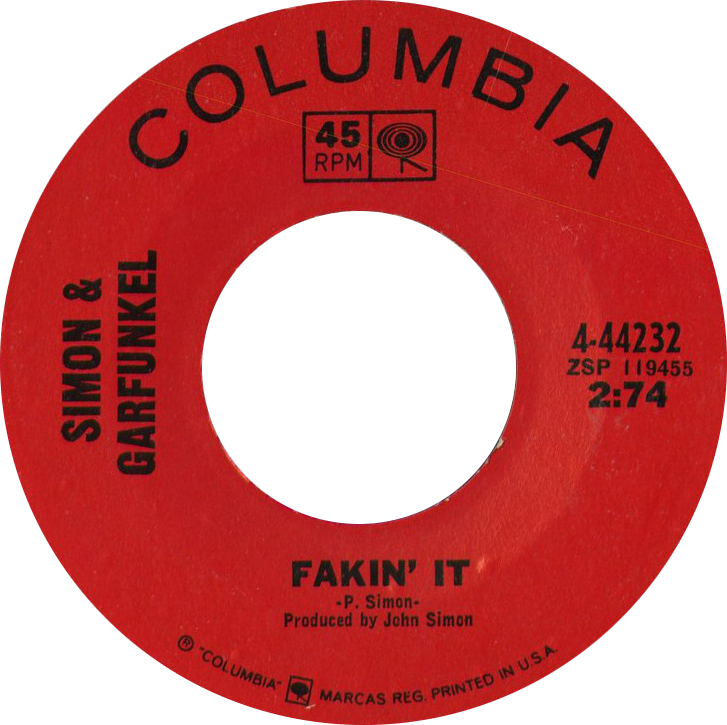
Side A of US vinyl single

"Fakin' It" was issued as a single that summer and found only modest success on AM radio; the duo were much more focused on the rising FM format, which played album cuts and treated their music with respect. The running time of the song was actually 3 minutes and 14 seconds. Radio stations at the time resisted playing songs lasting longer than three minutes, so Paul Simon had the time "faked" to read 2:74 on the label. Simon preferred the album version of "Fakin' It" to its single release. He felt the stereo remix "greatly improved" the original mix, which he considered to be "sloppy". On the other hand, Billboard particularly praised the production of the single version.

The single's B-side "You Don't Know Where Your Interest Lies" is the duo's only non-album B-side. Dana Valery recorded a version which was released as a single in January 1967. Valery's version became a massive song on the Northern Soul scene, having been a popular spin at the Wigan Casino nightclub in North West England in the mid-1970s.

It debuted on the Billboard Hot 100 in the US at number 81 in the issue dated July 29, 1967, rising over the course of five weeks to its peak of position 23 on September 2, 1967. It last appeared on the chart September 16, 1967, at position 65, before dropping out.

== Reception ==
Billboard predicted it might reach the top 20 of its chart in its review, calling it an "intriguing folk rocker" and praising John Simon's "exceptional" production work. Cash Box said that it has "good literary copy, and a very fine musical backing". Record World called it a "strange, compelling John Simon production". Mojo called "Fakin' It" a "dope-induced contemplation on an earlier life".

== Charts ==
Chart performance for "Fakin' It"
Chart (1967)	Peak position
US Billboard Hot 100	23

== Notes ==
=== Sources ===
- Bennighof, James (2007). The Words and Music of Paul Simon. Greenwood Publishing Group. ISBN 978-0-275-99163-0.
- Eliot, Marc (2010). Paul Simon: A Life. John Wiley and Sons. ISBN 978-0-470-43363-8.
- Fornatale, Pete (2007). Simon and Garfunkel's Bookends. Rodale. ISBN 978-1-59486-427-8.
