= Old Friends (Simon & Garfunkel song) =

Song by Simon & Garfunkel

from the album Bookends
- Recorded: March 8, 1968
- Genre: Folk rock
- Length: 2:36
- Label: Columbia
- Songwriter: Paul Simon
- Producers: Paul Simon; Art Garfunkel; Roy Halee

"Old Friends" is a song by the American music duo Simon & Garfunkel from their fourth studio album, Bookends (1968). On the album, it segues into the following song "Bookends Theme (Reprise)" with a single high, sustained note on the strings. "Old Friends" and "Bookends" were placed on the B-side of the "Mrs. Robinson" single, issued on April 5, 1968, by Columbia Records.

== Background ==
"Old Friends" was recorded after the production assistant John Simon left Columbia and was one of the last tracks recorded for Bookends, completed with the final "Bookends Theme" on March 8, 1968.

== Composition ==
"Old Friends" paints a portrait of two old men, and suggests reminiscence on the years of their youth. The song observes two men sitting "on a park bench like bookends" and imagines them young, one pondering to the other how strange it will feel to near the end of their lifetimes. The short companion song "Bookends Theme (Reprise)", addresses loss and the fleeting nature of memories, and of time spent together.

On the album "Old Friends", the title generally conveys the introduction or ending of sections, and the song builds upon a "rather loose formal structure" that at first includes an acoustic guitar and soft mood.

An additional element is introduced midway through the recorded version's orchestral accompaniment of the track, composed and conducted by Jimmie Haskell: a discordant orchestral crescendo, dominated by strings and glockenspiel notes. Horns and other instruments are added when the duo cease singing, creating a turbulence that builds to a single high, sustained note on the strings, possibly implying medical emergency and one of the friends' deaths. The song then segues into the final song of side one, the "Bookends Theme (Reprise)", which is generally heard as the conclusion and denouement of "Old Friends", rather than a wholly separate piece, and which is always performed live together with "Old Friends" by the duo.

== Bibliography ==
- Bennighof, James (2007). The Words and Music of Paul Simon. Greenwood Publishing Group. ISBN 978-0-275-99163-0.
- Eliot, Marc (2010). Paul Simon: A Life. Hoboken, New Jersey: Wiley. ISBN 978-0-470-43363-8.
- Fornatale, Pete (2007). Simon and Garfunkel's Bookends. Rodale. ISBN 978-1-59486-427-8.
