= Wednesday Morning, 3 A.M. =

1964 studio album by Simon & Garfunkel

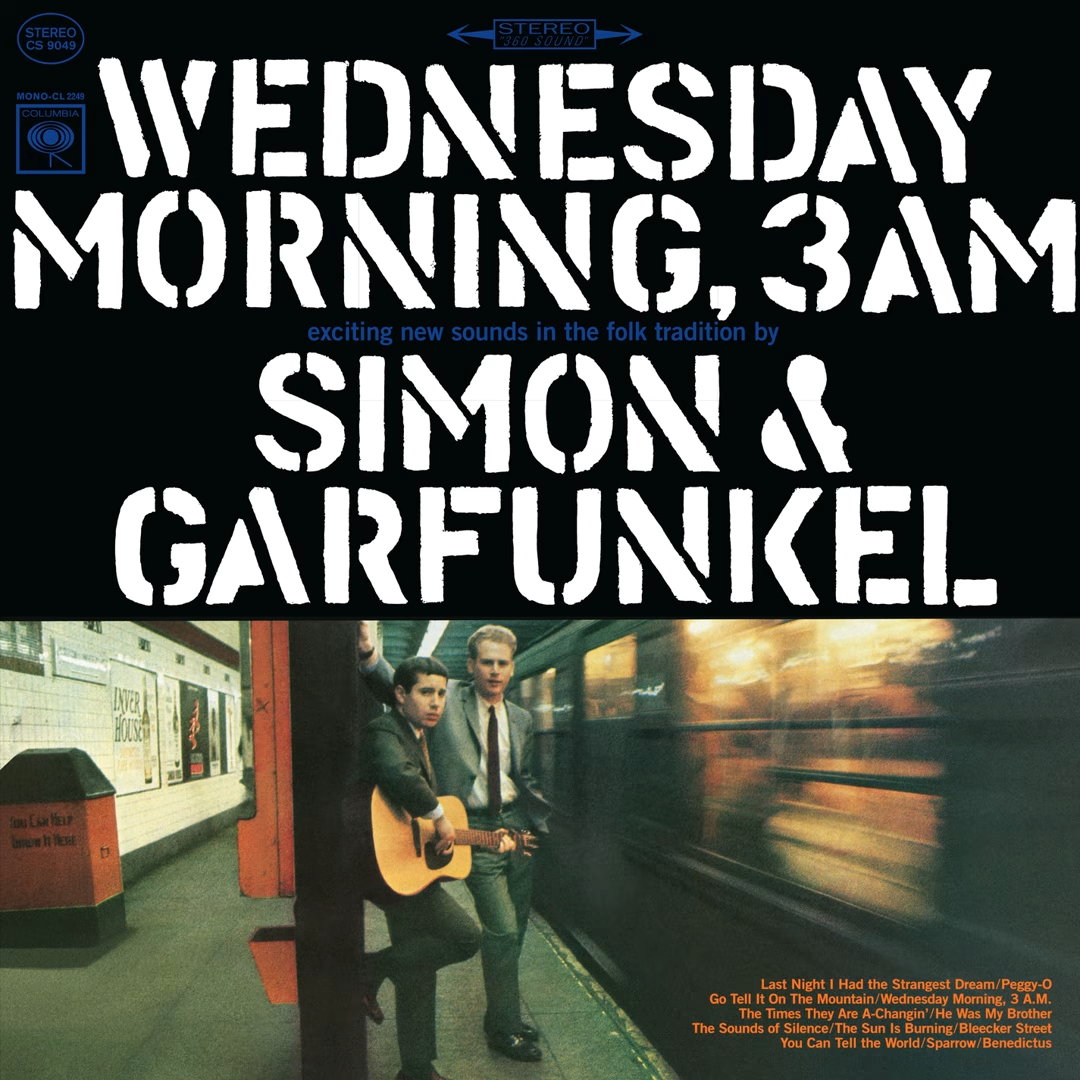

Studio album by Simon & Garfunkel
- Released: October 19, 1964
- Recorded: March 10–31, 1964
- Studios: Columbia 30th Street, New York City
- Genre: Folk
- Length: 31:31 (original LP), 39:56 (CD w/ bonus tracks)
- Label: Columbia
- Producer: Tom Wilson

Simon & Garfunkel chronology
Wednesday Morning, 3 A.M. (1964)	Sounds of Silence (1966)

Wednesday Morning, 3 A.M. is the debut studio album by the American folk rock duo Simon & Garfunkel. Following their early incarnation as rock 'n' roll duo Tom and Jerry, Columbia Records signed the pair in late 1963. The album was produced by Tom Wilson and engineered by Roy Halee. The cover and the label include the subtitle "exciting new sounds in the folk tradition". Recorded in March 1964, the album was released on October 19.

The album was initially unsuccessful, so Paul Simon moved to London, England and released his first solo album The Paul Simon Songbook. Art Garfunkel continued his studies at Columbia University in his native New York City, before reuniting with Simon in late 1965. Wednesday Morning, 3 A.M. was re-released in January 1966 (to capitalize on their newly found radio success because of the overdubbing of the song "The Sound of Silence" in June 1965, adding electric guitars, bass guitar and a drum kit, which was done under the direction of producer Tom Wilson without the duo's knowledge), and reached No. 30 on the Billboard 200. It was belatedly released in the UK two years later (in 1968) in both mono and stereo formats.

The song "He Was My Brother" was dedicated to Andrew Goodman, who was their friend and a classmate of Simon at Queens College. Andrew Goodman volunteered in Freedom Summer during 1964 and was abducted and killed in the murders of Chaney, Goodman, and Schwerner.

The album is included in its entirety as part of the Simon & Garfunkel box sets Collected Works and The Columbia Studio Recordings (1964–1970).

== Production ==
The album was produced by Tom Wilson and engineered by Roy Halee between March 10–31, 1964.

"Benedictus" was arranged and adapted from Orlando di Lasso's Missa Octavi toni, a Renaissance setting of the ordinary of the mass. The text, in Latin, is benedictus qui venit in nomine Domini (KJV: Blessed be he that cometh in the name of the Lord). The song is arranged for two voices with cello and sparse guitar accompaniment.

== Artwork ==
The album's cover photo was shot at the Fifth Avenue / 53rd Street subway station in New York City. In several concerts, Art Garfunkel related that during the photo session, several hundred pictures were taken that were unusable due to the "old familiar suggestion" on the wall in the background (a euphemism for the word "Fuck"), which inspired Paul Simon to write the song "A Poem on the Underground Wall" for the duo's later Parsley, Sage, Rosemary and Thyme album.

== Reception ==
The album was initially unsuccessful, having been released in the shadow of the British Invasion. This resulted in Paul Simon moving to England and Art Garfunkel continuing his studies at Columbia University in New York City. It ultimately reached No. 24 on the UK Album Charts, albeit in 1968, long after the duo had re-formed and gone on to greater success. Following the success of "The Sound of Silence", the album peaked at No. 30 on the Billboard album chart in 1966.

== Track listing ==
Side one
No.	Title	Writer(s)	Recorded	Length
1.	"You Can Tell the World"	Bob Gibson; Bob Camp	March 31, 1964	2:47
2.	"Last Night I Had the Strangest Dream"	Ed McCurdy	March 17, 1964	2:11
3.	"Bleecker Street"	Paul Simon	March 10, 1964	2:44
4.	"Sparrow"	Simon	March 31, 1964	2:49
5.	"Benedictus"	Traditional; arranged by Paul Simon & Art Garfunkel	March 31, 1964	2:38
6.	"The Sounds of Silence"	Simon	March 10, 1964	3:08
Total length:				16:17

Side two
No.	Title	Writer(s)	Recorded	Length
1.	"He Was My Brother"	Simon	March 17, 1964	2:48
2.	"Peggy-O"	Traditional; arranged by Simon & Garfunkel	March 31, 1964	2:26
3.	"Go Tell It on the Mountain"	Traditional; arranged by Simon & Garfunkel	March 31, 1964	2:06
4.	"The Sun Is Burning"	Ian Campbell	March 17, 1964	2:49
5.	"The Times They Are a-Changin'"	Bob Dylan	March 10, 1964	2:52
6.	"Wednesday Morning, 3 A.M."	Simon	March 17, 1964	2:13
Total length:				15:14 31:31

Bonus tracks (2001 CD reissue)
No.	Title	Writer(s)	Recorded	Length
13.	"Bleecker Street" (demo)	Simon	March 10, 1964	2:46
14.	"He Was My Brother" (alt. take 1, previously unissued)	Simon	March 17, 1964	2:52
15.	"The Sun Is Burning" (alt. take 12, previously unissued)	Campbell	March 17, 1964	2:47
Total length:				8:25 39:56

== Personnel ==
Sources:

- Paul Simon – acoustic guitar, vocals
- Art Garfunkel – vocals, liner notes
- Barry Kornfeld – acoustic guitar, banjo (on "Last Night I Had the Strangest Dream"), mandolin (on "Sparrow")
- Bill Lee – double bass
- Tom Wilson – producer
- Roy Halee – recording engineer

== Charts ==
Chart (1964 and 1966)	Peak position
UK Albums Chart	24
US Top LPs (Billboard)	30

== Certifications ==
Region	Certification	Certified units/sales
United Kingdom (BPI)	Silver	60,000^{‡}
^{‡} Sales+streaming figures based on certification alone.
