= The Essential Simon & Garfunkel =

Greatest hits album by Simon & Garfunkel
- Released: October 14, 2003
- Recorded: 1964–1975
- Genres: Folk rock, folk pop
- Length: 97:37
- Labels: Columbia; Legacy
- Producers: Tom Wilson; Bob Johnston; Paul Simon; Arthur Garfunkel; Roy Halee; John Simon; Phil Ramone

Simon & Garfunkel chronology
Tom & Jerry (2002)	The Essential Simon & Garfunkel (2003)	Old Friends: Live on Stage (2004)

Professional ratings
Review scores
Source	Rating
AllMusic	5/5 stars

The Essential Simon & Garfunkel is the second 2-CD compilation album of greatest hits by Simon & Garfunkel, released by Columbia Records on October 14, 2003.

The Essential Simon & Garfunkel was released to coincide with Simon and Garfunkel's 2003 reunion tour. It contains all of the duo's 16 singles originally released between 1964 and 1975 to reach the Hot 100 (including the 1975 reunion hit, "My Little Town"). The remaining 17 songs include non-hits like “Richard Cory”, and eight live performances from 1967 to 1969.

The standard 2CD edition of The Essential Simon & Garfunkel released in the US comprises 33 tracks; the 3CD edition contains a third disc bringing the total number of tracks to 39. The European 2CD edition of The Essential Simon & Garfunkel comprises 40 tracks, seven of which do not feature in the US 2CD version and five of which do not feature in the US 3CD version. The European edition includes all 33 tracks featured in the US 2CD edition and all but four tracks featured in the US 3CD edition.

== Track listing ==
All songs composed by Paul Simon, except where noted.

=== US version ===
Disc one

No.	Title	Original album(s)	Length
1.	"Wednesday Morning, 3 A.M." (Live at Philharmonic Hall, Lincoln Center, New York City, New York, January 22, 1967)	Live from New York City, 1967, 2002; originally from Wednesday Morning, 3 A.M., 1964	2:14
2.	"Bleecker Street"	Wednesday Morning, 3 A.M.	2:44
3.	"The Sound of Silence" (Acoustic version with electric overdubs)	Sounds of Silence, 1965; original acoustic version from Wednesday Morning, 3 A.M.	3:06
4.	"Leaves That Are Green" (Live at Philharmonic Hall, Lincoln Center, New York City, New York, January 22, 1967)	Live from New York, 1967; originally from Sounds of Silence	2:30
5.	"A Most Peculiar Man" (Live at the Memorial Auditorium, Burlington, Vermont, October 13, 1968)	Old Friends, 1997; originally from Sounds of Silence	2:33
6.	"I Am a Rock"	Sounds of Silence	2:51
7.	"Richard Cory"	Sounds of Silence	2:56
8.	"Kathy's Song" (Live in St. Louis, Missouri, November 1969)	Simon and Garfunkel's Greatest Hits, 1972, and later released on Live 1969, 2008 (through Starbucks)/2009 (Worldwide); originally from Sounds of Silence	3:22
9.	"Scarborough Fair/Canticle" (Traditional, arr. by Art Garfunkel, Simon)	Parsley, Sage, Rosemary and Thyme, 1966	3:10
10.	"Homeward Bound"	Sounds of Silence (in the UK)/Parsley, Sage, Rosemary and Thyme (Worldwide)	2:29
11.	"Sparrow" (Live at Philharmonic Hall, Lincoln Center, New York City, New York, January 22, 1967)	Live from New York, 1967; originally from Wednesday Morning, 3 A.M.	3:03
12.	"The 59th Street Bridge Song (Feelin' Groovy)"	Parsley, Sage, Rosemary and Thyme	1:55
13.	"The Dangling Conversation"	Parsley, Sage, Rosemary and Thyme	2:38
14.	"A Poem on the Underground Wall" (Live at Philharmonic Hall, Lincoln Center, New York City, New York, January 22, 1967)	First appeared on Old Friends, and later released on Live from New York, 1967; originally from Parsley, Sage, Rosemary and Thyme	2:06
15.	"A Hazy Shade of Winter"	Non-album single, 1966; later released on Bookends, 1968	2:17
16.	"At the Zoo"	Non-album single, 1967; later released on Bookends	2:23

Disc two

No.	Title	Original album(s)	Length
1.	"Mrs. Robinson"	The Graduate soundtrack, 1968; later released on Bookends that same year	4:03
2.	"Fakin' It"	Non-album single, 1967; later released on Bookends	3:18
3.	"Old Friends"	Bookends	2:35
4.	"Bookends Theme (Reprise)"	Bookends	1:21
5.	"America"	Bookends	3:37
6.	"Overs" (Live at the Memorial Auditorium, Burlington, Vermont, October 13, 1968)	Old Friends; originally from Bookends	2:25
7.	"El Condor Pasa (If I Could)" (Daniel Alomía Robles, English lyrics by Simon, arranged by Jorge Milchberg)	Bridge over Troubled Water, 1970	3:07
8.	"Bridge over Troubled Water"	Bridge over Troubled Water	4:53
9.	"Cecilia"	Bridge over Troubled Water	2:54
10.	"Keep the Customer Satisfied"	Bridge over Troubled Water	2:34
11.	"So Long, Frank Lloyd Wright"	Bridge over Troubled Water	3:42
12.	"The Boxer"	Non-album single, 1969; later released on Bridge over Troubled Water	5:09
13.	"Baby Driver"	Bridge over Troubled Water	3:16
14.	"The Only Living Boy in New York"	Bridge over Troubled Water	3:58
15.	"Song for the Asking"	Bridge over Troubled Water	1:50
16.	"For Emily, Whenever I May Find Her" (Live in St. Louis, Missouri, November 27, 1969)	Simon and Garfunkel's Greatest Hits, and later released on Live 1969; originally from Parsley, Sage, Rosemary and Thyme	2:26
17.	"My Little Town"	Still Crazy After All These Years (Simon); Breakaway (Garfunkel), 1975 (both solo albums)	3:51

Disc three (3.0 edition)

No.	Title	Original album(s)	Length
1.	"He Was My Brother" (Paul Kane (was an alias for Paul Simon))	Wednesday Morning, 3 A.M.	2:50
2.	"April Come She Will"	Sounds of Silence	1:50
3.	"7 O'Clock News/Silent Night" (Josef Mohr, Franz Gruber)	Parsley, Sage, Rosemary and Thyme	2:02
4.	"Punky's Dilemma"	Bookends	2:13
5.	"Why Don't You Write Me"	Bridge over Troubled Water	2:48
6.	"Citizen of the Planet"	Old Friends: Live on Stage, 2004	3:12

=== European version ===
Disc one

No.	Title	Original album(s)	Length
1.	"The Sound of Silence" (Acoustic version with electric overdubs)	Sounds of Silence; original acoustic version from Wednesday Morning, 3 A.M.	3:06
2.	"Wednesday Morning, 3 A.M." (Live at Philharmonic Hall, Lincoln Center, New York City, New York, January 22, 1967)	Live from New York City, 1967; originally from Wednesday Morning, 3 A.M.	2:44
3.	"Bye Bye Love" (Live recording from Ames, Iowa) (Felice and Boudleaux Bryant)	Bridge over Troubled Water	2:48
4.	"Bleecker Street"	Wednesday Morning, 3 A.M.	2:44
5.	"I Am a Rock"	Sounds of Silence	2:50
6.	"A Most Peculiar Man" (Live at the Memorial Auditorium, Burlington, Vermont, October 13, 1968)	Old Friends; originally from Sounds of Silence	2:33
7.	"Richard Cory"	Sounds of Silence	2:55
8.	"Kathy's Song" (Live in St. Louis, Missouri, November 1969)	Simon and Garfunkel's Greatest Hits, and later released on Live 1969; originally from Sounds of Silence	3:22
9.	"Scarborough Fair/Canticle" (Traditional, arr. by Simon & Garfunkel)	Parsley, Sage, Rosemary and Thyme	3:09
10.	"Homeward Bound"	Sounds of Silence (in the UK)/Parsley, Sage, Rosemary and Thyme (Worldwide)	2:28
11.	"Sparrow" (Live at Philharmonic Hall, Lincoln Center, New York City, New York, January 22, 1967)	Live from New York City, 1967; originally from Wednesday Morning, 3 A.M.	3:02
12.	"Leaves That Are Green" (Live at Philharmonic Hall, Lincoln Center, New York City, New York, January 22, 1967)	Live from New York City, 1967; originally from Sounds of Silence	2:30
13.	"He Was My Brother"	Wednesday Morning, 3 A.M.	2:49
14.	"The 59th Street Bridge Song (Feelin' Groovy)"	Parsley, Sage, Rosemary and Thyme	1:55
15.	"The Dangling Conversation"	Parsley, Sage, Rosemary and Thyme	2:37
16.	"A Poem on the Underground Wall" (Live at Philharmonic Hall, Lincoln Center, New York City, New York, January 22, 1967)	First appeared on Old Friends, and later released on Live from New York, 1967; originally from Parsley, Sage, Rosemary and Thyme	2:05
17.	"Blessed" (Live at Philharmonic Hall, Lincoln Center, New York City, New York, January 22, 1967)	First appeared on Old Friends, and later released on Live from New York, 1967; originally from Sounds of Silence	3:42
18.	"Cloudy"	Parsley, Sage, Rosemary and Thyme	2:22
19.	"Blues Run the Game" (Jackson C. Frank)	First appeared on Old Friends, and later as a bonus track on Sounds of Silence	2:52
20.	"A Hazy Shade of Winter"	Non-album single; later released on Bookends	2:17

Disc two

No.	Title	Original album(s)	Length
1.	"Mrs. Robinson"	The Graduate soundtrack; later released on Bookends that same year	4:02
2.	"Bridge over Troubled Water"	Bridge over Troubled Water	4:52
3.	"At the Zoo"	Non-album single; later released on Bookends	2:23
4.	"Fakin' It"	Non-album single; later released on Bookends	3:17
5.	"Old Friends"	Bookends	2:35
6.	"Bookends Theme"	Bookends	1:20
7.	"Punky's Dilemma"	Bookends	2:13
8.	"Overs" (Live at the Memorial Auditorium, Burlington, Vermont, October 13, 1968)	Old Friends; originally from Bookends	2:25
9.	"A Church Is Burning" (Live at Philharmonic Hall, Lincoln Center, New York City, New York, January 22, 1967)	Old Friends, and later released on Live from New York, 1967; originally from The Paul Simon Songbook, 1965 (Paul Simon's solo debut album)	3:22
10.	"America"	Bookends	3:37
11.	"El Condor Pasa (If I Could)" (Robles, English lyrics by Simon, arranged by Milchberg)	Bridge over Troubled Water	3:07
12.	"Cecilia"	Bridge over Troubled Water	2:54
13.	"Keep the Customer Satisfied"	Bridge over Troubled Water	2:34
14.	"So Long, Frank Lloyd Wright"	Bridge over Troubled Water	3:42
15.	"The Boxer"	Non-album single; later released on Bridge over Troubled Water	5:08
16.	"Baby Driver"	Bridge over Troubled Water	3:16
17.	"The Only Living Boy in New York"	Bridge over Troubled Water	3:58
18.	"Song for the Asking"	Bridge over Troubled Water	1:50
19.	"For Emily, Whenever I May Find Her" (Live in St. Louis, Missouri, November 27, 1969)	Simon and Garfunkel's Greatest Hits, and later released on Live 1969; originally from Parsley, Sage, Rosemary and Thyme	2:26
20.	"My Little Town"	Still Crazy After All These Years (Simon); Breakaway (Garfunkel) (both solo albums)	3:51

== Charts ==
=== Weekly charts ===
Chart (2003–2009)	Peak position
Australian Albums (ARIA)	20
Austrian Albums (Ö3 Austria)	23
Danish Albums (Hitlisten)	3
Dutch Albums (Album Top 100)	64
Finnish Albums (Suomen virallinen lista)	1
French Albums (SNEP)	143
German Albums (Offizielle Top 100)	24
Greek Albums (IFPI)	50
Italian Albums (FIMI)	28
Japanese Albums (Oricon)	104
New Zealand Albums (RMNZ)	38
Norwegian Albums (VG-lista)	1
Portuguese Albums (AFP)	26
Swedish Albums (Sverigetopplistan)	4
Swiss Albums (Schweizer Hitparade)	34
UK Albums (Official Charts)	25
US Billboard 200	27

=== Year-end charts ===
Chart (2003)	Position
Swedish Albums (Sverigetopplistan)	24
UK Albums (OCC)	91
Chart (2004)	Position
UK Albums (OCC)	182
Chart (2009)	Position
Australian Albums (ARIA)	88

== Certifications ==
Region	Certification	Certified units/sales
Australia (ARIA)	2× Platinum	140,000^{^}
Finland (Musiikkituottajat)	Gold	17,330
Germany (BVMI)	Gold	100,000^{‡}
Norway (IFPI Norway)	Platinum	40,000^{*}
Sweden (GLF)	Platinum	60,000^{^}
United Kingdom (BPI)	Platinum	300,000^{*}
United States (RIAA)	Platinum	500,000^{^}
^{*} Sales figures based on certification alone.^{^} Shipments figures based on certification alone.^{‡} Sales+streaming figures based on certification alone.
