= Paul Simon in Concert: Live Rhymin' =

Live album by Paul Simon
- Released: March 1974
- Recorded: 2–3 June & 2 November 1973
- Venues: Carnegie Hall, New York City; University of Notre Dame, South Bend (Indiana)
- Genre: Rock
- Length: 51:56
- Labels: Columbia, Warner Bros.
- Producer: Phil Ramone

Paul Simon chronology
There Goes Rhymin' Simon (1973)	Paul Simon in Concert: Live Rhymin' (1974)	Still Crazy After All These Years (1975)

Paul Simon in Concert: Live Rhymin' is a live album by Paul Simon, released in March 1974 by Columbia Records. It was recorded in the wake of the release of There Goes Rhymin' Simon, which produced a number of hit singles ("Kodachrome" and "Loves Me Like a Rock") and radio staples ("Something So Right" and "Take Me to the Mardi Gras"), at the University of Notre Dame in Indiana and Carnegie Hall in New York during Simon's 1973–74 tour. "The album is divided into two parts," Simon explained in a contemporary interview with Cash Box. "The first part is from the concert we did at Carnegie Hall. The second part, except for one cut, was recorded at Notre Dame."

The album featured both Latin and gospel influences, both in the arrangements and the performance style of the guests. Simon was joined by Urubamba for "El Cóndor Pasa (If I Could)", "Duncan", and "The Boxer", then brought out the Jessy Dixon Singers for the rest of the concert, before concluding with "America" on his own.

The album was Simon's first live release and showed him performing Simon & Garfunkel songs solo in concert for the first time, alternating with his solo songs.

Near the end of the album, an audience member calls out for Simon to "say a few words." He replies: "Say a few words? Well, let's hope that we continue to live."

The album was a moderate success. It reached No. 33 in the US and was eventually certified gold by the RIAA. However, it failed to chart at all in the UK. Further, two of the live performances were released as a single as part of the promotion for the album: the breakthrough Simon & Garfunkel "The Sound of Silence" as the A-side, along with Simon's debut single "Mother and Child Reunion" on the B-side.

Professional ratings
Review scores
Source	Rating
Allmusic	link
Christgau's Record Guide	C+

== Track listing ==
All tracks composed by Paul Simon, except where indicated.

=== Side 1 ===
1. "Me and Julio Down by the Schoolyard" – 2:47
2. "Homeward Bound" – 2:45
3. "American Tune" – 3:58
4. "El Cóndor Pasa (If I Could)" (Simon, Jorge Milchberg, Daniel Alomía Robles) – 4:08
5. "Duncan" – 5:11
6. "The Boxer" – 6:11

Total length: 25:00

=== Side 2 ===
1. "Mother and Child Reunion" – 4:00
2. "The Sound of Silence" – 4:27
3. "Jesus Is the Answer" (Andraé Crouch, Sandra Crouch) – 3:28
4. "Bridge over Troubled Water" – 7:10
5. "Loves Me Like a Rock" – 3:16
6. "America" – 4:35

Total length: 26:56 (51:56)

=== 2011 Reissue bonus tracks ===
1. "Kodachrome" – 2:55
2. "Something So Right" – 4:34

Total length: 7:29 (59:25)

== Charts ==
=== Chart positions ===
Chart (1974)	Position
Canadian RPM Albums Chart	27
Japanese Oricon Albums Chart	9
Norwegian Albums Chart	19
US Billboard Top Albums	33

=== Certifications ===
Region	Certification
United States (RIAA)	Gold
