= Simon and Garfunkel's Greatest Hits =

1972 compilation album

Greatest hits album by Simon & Garfunkel
- Released: June 14, 1972
- Recorded: March 1964–November 1969
- Genre: Folk rock
- Length: 43:25
- Label: Columbia
- Producers: Paul Simon; Art Garfunkel; Roy Halee

Simon & Garfunkel chronology
Bridge over Troubled Water (1970)	Simon and Garfunkel's Greatest Hits (1972)	Collected Works (1981)

Singles from Simon and Garfunkel's Greatest Hits
- 1. "For Emily, Wherever I May Find Her" Released: August 10, 1972; 2. "America" Released: November 1972

Simon and Garfunkel's Greatest Hits is the first greatest hits album by Simon & Garfunkel, released on June 14, 1972, two years after the duo disbanded. In 2003, it was ranked No. 293 on Rolling Stone's list of the 500 greatest albums of all time.

The album was a mix of original studio recordings and four previously unreleased live recordings. The album's minimalist packaging does not specifically date the latter; however, the live versions of "For Emily, Whenever I May Find Her" and "Kathy's Song" included on Greatest Hits were also included on the 2008 album Live 1969. The liner notes to Live 1969 state that these two songs were both recorded at a November 1969 concert in St. Louis, Missouri. According to the liner notes from Collected Works, however, the version of "Kathy's Song" was taken from a 1968 concert in Vermont.

== Overview ==
In a 1975 BBC Radio 1 interview, Roy Halee identified this version of "The 59th Street Bridge Song" as being from Simon & Garfunkel's 1970 performance at Carnegie Hall, "the last concert they did together" (prior to their disbanding later in 1970). A live version of "Homeward Bound" was also included on the album.

The remaining ten studio songs comprise nine singles released between 1965 and 1972, "America" being issued as a single several years after its appearance as a track on the Bookends album, and one album track, "Bookends" (without its parent song "Old Friends").

All the singles included, except "America", "El Condor Pasa (If I Could)", and "Scarborough Fair/Canticle" made the Top Ten, with the last peaking at No. 11. "Mrs. Robinson" topped the chart aided by its appearance in Mike Nichols' hit movie The Graduate. "The Sound of Silence" and "Bridge over Troubled Water" also peaked at No. 1 as singles in their studio versions, and "The Boxer" peaked as a single at No. 7.

== Reception ==
Professional ratings
Review scores
Source	Rating
AllMusic	3.5/5 stars
Rolling Stone	(favorable)

Simon and Garfunkel's Greatest Hits peaked on the U.S. albums chart at No. 5. On the UK Album Chart, it was a No. 2 hit. The album has proven a long and durable seller, currently being certified for 14 million units sold in the U.S. alone. It is easily their best-selling album in the U.S., and holds the record in the U.S. for the best-selling album by a duo. In 2003, the album was ranked No. 293 on Rolling Stone's list of the 500 greatest albums of all time. The album was reissued in the 2000s as "Playlist: The Very Best of Simon & Garfunkel".

== Track listing ==
All songs composed by Paul Simon unless otherwise noted.

=== Side one ===
1. "Mrs. Robinson" (some pressings use the single mix with an early fade-out at 3:51; later pressings revert to the Bookends album version at 4:02) – 3:51 or 4:02
2. "For Emily, Whenever I May Find Her" (Live in St. Louis, MO, November 1969) – 2:25
3. "The Boxer" – 5:11
4. "The 59th Street Bridge Song (Feelin' Groovy)" (Live at Carnegie Hall, New York, NY, July 1970, with applause cross-fade into the studio version of "The Sound of Silence") – 1:50
5. "The Sound of Silence" (Acoustic version with electric overdubs) – 3:11
6. "I Am a Rock" – 2:53
7. "Scarborough Fair/Canticle" (Traditional; arranged by Simon, Art Garfunkel) – 3:09

=== Side two ===
1. "Homeward Bound" (Live at Carnegie Hall, New York, NY, July 1970, with applause cross-fade into the studio version of "Bridge over Troubled Water") – 2:42
2. "Bridge over Troubled Water" – 4:53
3. "America" – 3:33
4. "Kathy's Song" (Live in St. Louis, MO, November 1969) – 3:23
5. "El Condor Pasa (If I Could)" (Daniel Alomía Robles; English lyrics by Simon, arranged by Jorge Milchberg) – 3:08
6. "Bookends" (same track as "Bookends Theme" from the Bookends LP; although cross-faded from "Old Friends" on Bookends, on this album it is a stand-alone track) – 1:21
7. "Cecilia" (some pressings use the single mix from 1970; reissues use a hybrid of the single and the album version from Bridge over Troubled Water) – 2:53

== Charts ==
=== Peak positions ===
Chart	Position
Australian Kent Music Report	10
Belgian Albums Chart (Flanders)	5
Canadian RPM Albums Chart	2
Dutch Albums Chart	1
German Media Control Albums Chart	6
Japanese Oricon Albums Chart	3
New Zealand Albums Chart	12
Norwegian Albums Chart	7
Spanish Albums Chart	2
Swedish Kvällstoppen Chart	2
UK Albums Chart	2
US Billboard 200	5

=== Year-end charts ===
Chart (1972)	Position
Dutch Albums Chart	3
German Albums (Offizielle Top 100)	3
UK Albums Chart	3
US Top Pop Albums	72
Chart (1977)	Position
German Albums (Offizielle Top 100)	13
Chart (1978)	Position
German Albums (Offizielle Top 100)	29
Chart (1979)	Position
German Albums (Offizielle Top 100)	16
Chart (1980)	Position
German Albums (Offizielle Top 100)	48

== Certifications and sales ==
Region	Certification	Certified units/sales
Belgium (BRMA)	Gold	25,000^{*}
Canada (Music Canada)	5× Platinum	500,000^{^}
Finland (Musiikkituottajat)	Gold	33,092
France (SNEP)	Diamond	1,000,000^{*}
Germany (BVMI)	2× Platinum	1,500,000
Greece (IFPI Greece)	Gold	50,000^{^}
Hong Kong (IFPI Hong Kong)	Platinum	20,000^{*}
Ireland	—	25,000
Italy (FIMI) sales since 2009	Gold	25,000^{*}
Japan	—	123,000
New Zealand (RMNZ)	Gold	7,500^{‡}
Switzerland (IFPI Switzerland) Columbia/Sony	4× Platinum	200,000^{^}
Switzerland (IFPI Switzerland) Columbia/Sony Music	2× Platinum	100,000^{^}
United Kingdom (BPI) 1972-2006 sales	Platinum	1,840,454
United Kingdom (BPI) reissue, 2011-2025 sales	4× Platinum	1,200,000^{‡}
United States (RIAA)	14× Platinum	14,000,000^{^}
^{*} Sales figures based on certification alone.^{^} Shipments figures based on certification alone.^{‡} Sales+streaming figures based on certification alone.

== See also ==
- List of best-selling albums in the United States
- List of diamond albums in France
