= Duncan (Paul Simon song) =

Single by Paul Simon

from the album Paul Simon
- B-side: "Run That Body Down"
- Released: July 1972
- Recorded: 1971
- Genre: Pop rock; folk rock
- Length: 4:34
- Label: Columbia
- Songwriter: Paul Simon
- Producers: Roy Halee; Paul Simon

Paul Simon singles chronology
"Me and Julio Down by the Schoolyard" (1972)	"Duncan" (1972)	"Kodachrome" (1973)

"Duncan" is a song by the American singer-songwriter Paul Simon. It was the third and final single from his second self-titled studio album (1972), released on Columbia Records in July 1972 backed with "Run That Body Down". The song peaked at No. 52 on the Billboard Pop Singles chart in 1972.

A ballad in E-minor, "Duncan" tells the story of Lincoln Duncan, a fisherman's son. An inability to fall asleep in a cheap motel due to the loud sex that a couple is having next door sends Duncan off on a long reverie. He recalls his decision to leave "the boredom and the chowder" of his hometown in the Canadian Maritime Provinces and head towards New England. He recalls running out of money, losing his confidence and faith in himself, and gaining them back after losing his virginity to a young female street preacher – "just like a dog I was befriended". In the last stanza, he is lying on the ground at night playing his guitar and thanking God for his fingers. Between the stanzas, the song features instrumental interludes, played on two flutes, by Los Incas, an Andean group which had previously collaborated with Simon & Garfunkel on "El Condor Pasa (If I Could)" in 1970.

Cash Box said that "the instrumental bridge is straight out of the Pied Piper mystique." Record World felt it was "slightly more subdued" than the first two singles from the album.

== Live performances ==
A concert rendition featuring Urubamba performing the interludes was included on the 1974 album Paul Simon in Concert: Live Rhymin'. It gained radio airplay itself, and has gone on to become a semi-regular on satellite radio's Deep Tracks station. Simon has included the song in his set lists for some subsequent tours as well.

During a show in Toronto on May 7, 2011, Rayna Ford, a fan from Conception Bay, Newfoundland and Labrador, called out for Simon to play the song, and said something to the effect that she learned to play guitar on the song. Paul Simon invited her on stage, handed her a guitar and asked her to play it for the crowd.

== Personnel ==
- Paul Simon – vocals, acoustic guitar, arranger, producer
- Los Incas – flute, charango, percussion

== Charts ==
Chart (1972)	Peak position
Canada (RPM)	39
US Easy Listening (Billboard)	30
US Billboard Hot 100	52

== Notes ==
=== Sources ===
- Bennighof, James (2007). The Words and Music of Paul Simon. Greenwood Publishing Group. ISBN 978-0-275-99163-0.
- Eliot, Marc (2010). Paul Simon: A Life. John Wiley and Sons. ISBN 978-0-470-43363-8.
