= El Cóndor Pasa =

El Cóndor Pasa can refer to:

- El cóndor pasa (zarzuela), Peruvian musical play
- "El Cóndor Pasa" (song), musical piece from the play
  - El Condor Pasa (If I Could), version by Simon and Garfunkel
- El Condor Pasa (horse), (1995-2002), Thoroughbred racehorse named after the play
