= Live from New York City, 1967 =

Live album by Simon & Garfunkel
- Released: 16 July 2002
- Recorded: 22 January 1967
- Genre: Folk rock
- Length: 58:21
- Label: Columbia/Legacy
- Producer: Paul Simon, Art Garfunkel, Roy Halee & Bob Irwin

Simon & Garfunkel chronology
The Columbia Studio Recordings (1964-1970) (2001)	Live from New York City, 1967 (2002)	Tom & Jerry (2002)

Professional ratings
Review scores
Source	Rating
AllMusic	4/5 stars

Live from New York City, 1967 is the second live album by Simon & Garfunkel, recorded at Philharmonic Hall at Lincoln Center in New York City, on 22 January 1967. The album was released on the Columbia Legacy CK 61513 label on 16 July 2002.

The performance was the first official live release by Simon and Garfunkel recorded in the 1960s. Recorded in 1967 prior to the duo's work on the soundtrack to The Graduate. It features many of the duo's early hits and album tracks, such as "Leaves That Are Green", "He Was My Brother", and "For Emily, Whenever I May Find Her".

Four of the tracks from the album were previously released on 1997's Old Friends box-set which contained five songs from the Lincoln Center concert, though "Red Rubber Ball" was not included on this release.

In contrast to the duo's other official live releases (The Concert in Central Park, Old Friends: Live on Stage, and Live 1969), this recording features Paul Simon and Art Garfunkel performing alone. This album does not capture the same show as the bootleg Live from New York City, 1966, despite similar material and packaging.

== Track listing ==
All songs by Paul Simon, except where noted.

1. "He Was My Brother" – 3:21
2. "Leaves That Are Green" – 2:57
3. "Sparrow" – 3:06
4. "Homeward Bound" – 2:39
5. "You Don't Know Where Your Interest Lies" – 2:06
6. "A Most Peculiar Man" – 2:59
7. "The 59th Street Bridge Song (Feelin' Groovy)" – 1:49
8. "The Dangling Conversation" – 3:01
9. "Richard Cory" – 3:23
10. "A Hazy Shade of Winter" – 2:37
11. "Benedictus" (Traditional, arr. Simon & Art Garfunkel) – 2:45
12. "Blessed" – 3:45
13. "A Poem on the Underground Wall" – 4:45
14. "Anji" (Davy Graham) – 2:28
15. "I Am a Rock" – 2:57
16. "The Sound of Silence" – 3:25
17. "For Emily, Whenever I May Find Her" – 2:40
18. "A Church Is Burning" – 3:43
19. "Wednesday Morning, 3 A.M." – 3:35

== Personnel ==
- Paul Simon: Acoustic guitar, vocals
- Art Garfunkel: Vocals
