= El cóndor pasa (zarzuela) =

1913 Peruvian zarzuela by Julio Baudouin and Daniel Alomía Robles

- Zarzuela by Daniel Alomía Robles
- Book cover for the libretto
- Librettist: Julio Baudouin
- Premiere: 19 December 1913; Teatro Mazzi, Lima

El cóndor pasa is a Peruvian zarzuela (musical play) whose music was composed by Peruvian songwriter Daniel Alomía Robles in 1913 with a script written by Julio de La Paz (pseudonym of the Peruvian dramatist Julio Baudouin). This zarzuela is written in prose and consists of one musical play and two acts.

The eponymous piece, El cóndor pasa, performed during the zarzuela's parade scene, has no lyrics. The zarzuela's famous eponymous melody is considered the second national anthem of Peru. It is based on the traditional Andean music of Peru, which was declared an element of National Cultural Heritage in 2004. There are probably more than 400 versions of the piece by artists from around the world, at least 300 of which have lyrics. The piano arrangement of this play's most famous melody was legally registered on May 3, 1933, by the Edward B. Marks Music Corporation with the United States' Library of Congress under the number 9643.

== Roles ==
- Mr. King (baritone), owner of the mine
- Mr. Cup, owner of the mine
- María (soprano), Higinio's wife
- Higinio, María's husband
- Frank (tenor), María's son
- Juanacha, Ruperto's fiancée
- Ruperto, Juanacha's fiancée
- Félix, miner
- Tiburcio, miner
- Godmother
- Godfather.
- Shepherd.

== Plot ==
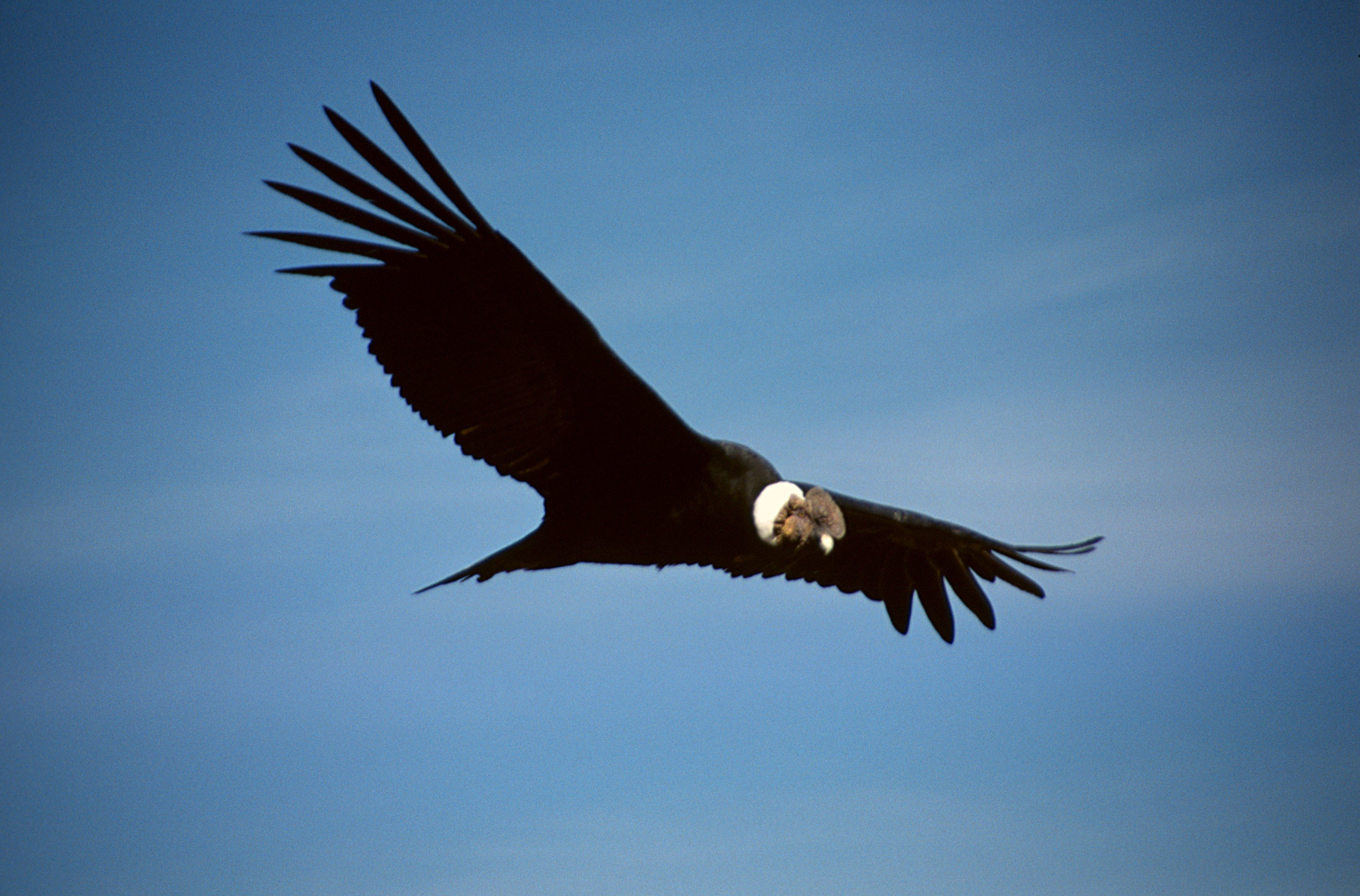
The Andean condor, a symbol of freedom from which the zarzuela takes its name.

The story takes place in the early twentieth century in Yápac, a mining settlement in the Peruvian Andes.

=== Act 1 ===
The first scene begins with the Prelude. It is before dawn and Yápac's miners are heading to work. A male choir is performing a mournful song "En la nieve de las cumbres" ("On the Snow of the Peaks"). At the end of the song some miners fall behind while listening to the shepherd playing the quena (traditional flute of the Andes); they watch him disappear among the clouds that surround the peaks with admiration, and they envy his freedom. Frank is a young miner who does not accept the mine owners' abuse. "Something tells me that life isn't this way", Frank says, but the other miners accuse him of being ungrateful to the mine owners.

In the second scene, Juanacha and Ruperto (two shepherds) enter the stage. Ruperto is playfully chasing Juanacha, whom he is about to marry. Everyone leaves the stage but Frank, who performs a melancholic yaraví (song) "Pobre alma prisionera" ("Poor Captive Soul") while he reflects on his identity, appearance, and feelings.

In the third scene, mine owners Mr. King and Mr. Cup enter the stage chatting, when they see Frank sitting on a rock outside the gallery. Mr. King questions Frank and tells him to get back inside the mine after a brief altercation. Mr. King and Mr. Cup continue their conversation after Frank leaves.

During the fourth scene Mr. King forces the four miners to exit the gallery with gunfire. He asks briefly about their progress and sends them back in. Tension grows between Frank and Mr. King. María enters on stage out of breath, bringing liquor to Mr. King. They talk about Frank, and María tries to intercede for her son. It is revealed that Mr. King is Frank's biological father. María and King sing together "Perdónalo, taita" ("Forgive Him, Father"), and Mr. King finally agrees not to punish the boy, swayed by the passion he feels towards María. They leave together, while Higinio, María's husband, comes out of the gallery and furiously acknowledges his anger towards his bosses and plots his revenge.

=== Act 2 ===
Outside the mine, a feast is being held in honor of Ruperto and Juanacha's wedding that is going to take place in the town. During a cachua (dance), the sky darkens; a storm will begin soon and the couple will be unable to reach the town to get married. Everyone prays to the Virgin, singing "Dulce reina de las cumbres" ("Sweet Queen of the Peaks") and miraculously the sun shines again. The couple and friends head to town, dancing (parade), except for the miners who can not leave work. It is during this scene that the tune "El cóndor pasa" is played. During the party, Mr. King has too much to drink, and cruelly abuses Higinio. When Mr. King leaves, Higinio follows him on a higher path, and pushes a boulder onto him when they reach a gorge, causing his death. A shepherd witnesses the horrible murder and tells the other miners about it. Higinio admits it all; María weeps inconsolably over the tragedy that has struck her family; and the miners fear for their lives. The other mine owner, Mr. Cup, arrives gun in hand looking for the murderer. Frank faces him, defending Higinio and his friends, and kills him. Everyone is horrified at these events. The appearance of a condor, the first one after many years, is seen as a sign of a new life of freedom and they are filled with hope. "We are all condors", the miners shout joyfully.

== Covers and adaptations ==
The pieces were originally written for orchestra, not for Andean instruments. The most famous parts, such as the prelude, parade, and cachua, have been adapted from the piano arrangement that Daniel Alomía Robles sold to The Edward B. Marks Music Corp., in New York, by the Colectivo Cultural Centenario El Cóndor Pasa in 1933. All of the pieces are exempt from copyright license fees due to the time elapsed since they were registered.

=== Paul Simon's cover ===
In 1965, American artist Paul Simon listened to the version of the parade tune performed by Los Incas in the Théâtre de l'Est Parisien (Paris). Simon asked the band permission to include a cover version of the song on an album. The band advised him that the piece belonged to Andean folklore, while the arrangement was by Jorge Milchberg (director of Los Incas). Milchberg is represented as the arrangement's co-author because he added two notes which entitled him to collect royalties. In 1970, Simon & Garfunkel covered the Los Incas' version under the name "El Cóndor Pasa" ("If I Could"), adding English lyrics written by Simon, and included it in the album Bridge Over Troubled Water. Because Simon believed, in accordance with the band's description, that the piece was an Andean folk melody, the album credits did not list Daniel Alomía Robles as the piece's original composer. Rather, the album's credits listed Simon as the author of the lyrics and did not list anyone as the melody's author. This cover achieved worldwide fame, and has itself been covered multiple times, its lyrics translated into multiple languages. Even Armando Robles Godoy, the composer's son and Peruvian filmmaker, wrote new lyrics for the song using Paul Simon's version as a reference.

=== Other versions ===
In July 2013, the Colectivo Cultural Centenario El Cóndor Pasa (cultural association) re-edited the original script of the zarzuela, which had been lost for some time, as a CD containing the dialogue and seven musical pieces. The music from the original score was reconstructed by musicologist Luis Salazar Mejía, with the collaboration of musicians Daniel Dorival and Claude Ferrier, and it was performed on November 14, 15 and 16, 2013, at the Teatro UNI in Lima to commemorate the masterpiece's first centenary. All of the work done to recover and re-release the zarzuela (including the CD) was possible thanks to the efforts of musicologist Luis Salazar Mejía and cultural promoter Mario Cerrón Fetta (members of the above-mentioned cultural association), and was carried out without any public financial support.

== See also ==
- Music of Peru
- Andean music
- El kondor pada
