= Old Friends: Live on Stage =

2004 live/video album by Simon & Garfunkel

Live album by Simon and Garfunkel
- Released: December 7, 2004
- Recorded: December 3–8, 2003
- Venue: Madison Square Garden, New York City, and Continental Airlines Arena, East Rutherford,
- Genre: Folk rock
- Length: 96:07
- Label: Columbia / Sony BMG

Simon and Garfunkel chronology
The Essential Simon & Garfunkel (2003)	Old Friends: Live on Stage (2004)	The Collection: Simon & Garfunkel (2007)

Old Friends: Live on Stage

Video by Simon and Garfunkel
- Released: December 7, 2004
- Recorded: December 2003
- Venue: Madison Square Garden, New York City,
- Genre: Folk rock
- Length: 140 minutes
- Label: Columbia / Sony BMG
- Director: Kate Twitchell, Ken Ehrlich

Simon and Garfunkel chronology
The Concert in Central Park (1982)	Old Friends: Live on Stage (2004)

Professional ratings
Review scores
Source	Rating
Allmusic	3/5 stars
Classic Rock	(DVD)

Simon & Garfunkel's Old Friends: Live On Stage is the third live album and documentary from their highly successful "Old Friends" reunion concert tour of 2003, with the Everly Brothers as special guests. The "double album" was available as either a 2-CD set or a DVD, separately, or together as a 3-disc package. Both the 2-CD set and DVD were released in December 2004.

The live performances were taken from a series of shows at Madison Square Garden in New York City, and Continental Airlines Arena in East Rutherford, New Jersey between December 3–8, 2003.

Both the DVD and the 2-CD set include a new studio song, "Citizen of the Planet", written by Paul Simon in the 1980s and recently completed with Art Garfunkel. The DVD contains two Simon & Garfunkel songs that were omitted from the 2-CD set: "Keep the Customer Satisfied" and "The 59th Street Bridge Song (Feelin' Groovy)". There are also two additional songs performed by the Everly Brothers, which are not included in the 2-CD set. The DVD includes a series of clips from Simon & Garfunkel's rarely seen 1969 television special Songs of America as part of its extra features.

== Track listings ==
=== CD 1 ===
1. "Old Friends/Bookends" – 3:33
2. "A Hazy Shade of Winter" – 3:33
3. "I Am a Rock" – 4:23 †
4. "America" – 4:53
5. "At the Zoo" – 1:33
6. "Baby Driver" – 2:58
7. "Kathy's Song" – 3:58
8. "Tom and Jerry Story" – 2:14
9. "Hey, Schoolgirl" – 0:45
10. "The Everly Brothers Intro" – 1:42
11. "Bye Bye Love" (with the Everly Brothers) – 3:00
12. "Scarborough Fair/Canticle" – 3:50
13. "Homeward Bound" – 5:41
14. "The Sound of Silence" – 5:04

=== CD 2 ===
1. "Mrs. Robinson" – 4:32
2. "Slip Slidin' Away" – 4:59
3. "El Condor Pasa (If I Could)" – 3:34
4. "The Only Living Boy in New York" – 4:03
5. "American Tune" – 4:40
6. "My Little Town" – 4:35
7. "Bridge over Troubled Water" – 6:11 †
8. "Cecilia" – 4:25 †
9. "The Boxer" – 5:07
10. "Leaves That Are Green" – 3:22
11. "Citizen of the Planet" – 3:14

=== DVD ===
1. "Opening Montage (America intro)"
2. "Old Friends/Bookends"
3. "A Hazy Shade of Winter"
4. "I Am a Rock" †
5. "America"
6. "At the Zoo"/"Baby Driver"
7. "Kathy's Song"
8. "Tom and Jerry Story"
9. "Hey, Schoolgirl"
10. "The Everly Brothers Intro"
11. "Wake Up Little Susie" (Performed by the Everly Brothers)
12. "All I Have to Do Is Dream" (Performed by the Everly Brothers)
13. "Bye Bye Love" (with the Everly Brothers)
14. "Scarborough Fair"
15. "Homeward Bound"
16. "The Sound of Silence"

1. "Opening Montage"
2. "Mrs. Robinson"
3. "Slip Slidin' Away" †
4. "El Condor Pasa"
5. "Keep the Customer Satisfied" †
6. "The Only Living Boy in New York"
7. "American Tune"
8. "My Little Town"
9. "Bridge over Troubled Water" †
10. "Cecilia" †
11. "The Boxer"
12. "Leaves That Are Green"
13. "The 59th Street Bridge Song (Feelin' Groovy)"

† – performed in a lower key to accommodate the deepening of both Simon and Garfunkel's voices

== Personnel ==
- Paul Simon: Guitar, vocals;
- Art Garfunkel: Vocals;
- Warren Bernhardt: Piano;
- Jamey Haddad: Percussion;
- Jim Keltner: Drums;
- Pino Palladino: Bass guitar;
- Larry Saltzman: Guitar;
- Rob Schwimmer: Keyboards, theremin;
- Mark Stewart: Guitars, cello.

with

- Don Everly: Guitar, vocals;
- Phil Everly: Guitar, vocals.

== Charts ==
Chart performance for Old Friends: Live on Stage
Chart (2004–2009)	Peak position
Australian Albums (ARIA)	22
Austrian Albums (Ö3 Austria)	41
French Albums (SNEP)	165
German Albums (Offizielle Top 100)	35
Spanish Albums (PROMUSICAE)	98
UK Albums (OCC)	61
US Billboard 200	154

== Certifications and sales ==
Certifications for Old Friends: Live on Stage
Region	Certification	Certified units/sales
Australia (ARIA) album	Gold	35,000^{^}
Australia (ARIA) DVD	2× Platinum	30,000^{^}
^{^} Shipments figures based on certification alone.
