= Just a Boy (disambiguation) =

Just a Boy is a 1974 album by English singer-songwriter, Leo Sayer.

Just a Boy may also refer to:

- "Just a Boy", a 2009 song by Simone Battle
- "Just a Boy", a song by Angus & Julia Stone from the 2007 album A Book Like This
- "Just a Boy", a song by Olivia O'Brien from the 2019 album Was It Even Real?
- "Just a Boy", a 1966 song by The Chiffons from Sweet Talkin' Guy
- "Just a Boy", a 1960 single by Simon & Garfunkel (as Tom & Jerry) released on the 2002 compilation album Tom & Jerry
- "Just a Boy", a song by Kiss from the 1981 album Music from "The Elder"
- Just a Boy, a 2007 album by Jizzy Pearl
