= Me and Julio Down by the Schoolyard =

Single by Paul Simon

from the album Paul Simon
- B-side: "Congratulations"
- Released: May 1972
- Recorded: 1971
- Genre: Pop rock; folk rock
- Length: 2:44
- Label: Columbia
- Songwriter: Paul Simon
- Producers: Roy Halee; Paul Simon

Paul Simon singles chronology
"Mother and Child Reunion" (1972)	"Me and Julio Down by the Schoolyard" (1972)	"Duncan" (1972)

Music video
- "Me and Julio Down by the Schoolyard" on YouTube

"Me and Julio Down by the Schoolyard" is a song by the American singer-songwriter Paul Simon. It was the second single from his second album, Paul Simon (1972), released on Columbia Records.

== Background ==
"Me and Julio Down by the Schoolyard" begins with "mama pajama" visiting the police station after seeing something that was "against the law". In an interview for Rolling Stone, Jon Landau asked Paul Simon: "What is it that the mama saw? The whole world wants to know." Simon replied: "I have no idea what it is... Something sexual is what I imagine, but when I say 'something', I never bothered to figure out what it was. Didn't make any difference to me."

Simon described the song as "a bit of inscrutable doggerel". The mention of a "radical priest" has been interpreted as a reference to Daniel Berrigan; Berrigan had been featured on the cover of Time on January 25, 1971, near when the song was written. The song mentions "Rosie, the queen of Corona"; Corona is a neighborhood in Queens near where Simon grew up. Airto Moreira played a cuica after Simon asked him to find an instrument that resembled a human voice.

== Critical reception ==
Record World said that the "effervescent tune tells of growing up absurd in Queens" and called the song "a sheer delight". Cashbox selected "Me and Julio Down by the Schoolyard" as one of their "Picks of the Week" in the April 1, 1972 edition.

== Music video ==
In 1988, Simon released a music video for "Me and Julio Down by the Schoolyard" to promote his greatest hits compilation Negotiations and Love Songs. It was filmed at Mathews-Palmer Park in Hell's Kitchen, which was standing in for Halsey Junior High School in Forest Hills, Queens, the neighborhood in which Simon grew up and met Art Garfunkel in high school. Many of the children featured in the video were from that same school; Kia Jeffries, who sang on Simon's album The Rhythm of the Saints (1990) and cast the video, had attended as well.

It features an introduction by hip-hop MCs (and then-fellow Warner Bros. Records label mates) Big Daddy Kane and Biz Markie. Main Source member Large Professor also makes a cameo towards the end. The video depicts adults interacting with the youth of an inner-city schoolyard. It shows Simon playing basketball and stickball with the children, and it also features basketball player Spud Webb, baseball player Mickey Mantle, and football coach-commentator John Madden giving tips to young athletes.

== Personnel ==
- Paul Simon – vocals, acoustic guitar, whistling
- David Spinozza – acoustic guitar
- Airto Moreira – percussion
- Russell George – bass guitar

== In popular culture ==
The song appears in a montage in the 2001 film The Royal Tenenbaums directed by filmmaker Wes Anderson and on the 2002 re-release edition of the soundtrack. It also appears in the 2004 film A Home at the End of the World, over the opening credits of the 2002 film Maid in Manhattan, in 2011's The Simpsons episode "Holidays of Future Passed", in the 2011 film The Muppets, and in the trailer for the 2019 film Missing Link. Simon performed the song with Stephen Colbert on the September 11, 2015, episode of The Late Show.

== Charts ==
=== Weekly charts ===
Chart (1972)	Peak position
Australia (Go-Set)	40
Canada (RPM) Top Singles	6
Canada MOR Playlist (RPM)	12
Ireland (IRMA)	19
Israel (IBA)	1
Netherlands (Single Top 100)	26
New Zealand (Listener)	7
UK Singles (Official Charts Company)	15
US Easy Listening (Billboard)	9
US Billboard Hot 100	22
US Cash Box Top 100	7
Zimbabwe (ZIMA)	15

=== Year-end charts ===
Chart (1972)	Rank
US (Joel Whitburn's Pop Annual)	162

== Certifications ==
Region	Certification	Certified units/sales
New Zealand (RMNZ)	2× Platinum	60,000^{‡}
United Kingdom (BPI)	Gold	400,000^{‡}
^{‡} Sales+streaming figures based on certification alone.

== Notes ==
=== Sources ===
- Bennighof, James (2007). The Words and Music of Paul Simon. Greenwood Publishing Group. ISBN 978-0-275-99163-0.
- Eliot, Marc (2010). Paul Simon: A Life. John Wiley and Sons. ISBN 978-0-470-43363-8.
