= Carlos Miguel Benn =

Argentine sailor

Carlos Miguel Benn (29 September 1924 – 26 March 2014) was an Argentine yacht racer who competed in the 1952 Summer Olympics. Benn was later a member of the Andean folk music group Los Incas.
