= Live 1969 =

Live album by Simon and Garfunkel
- Released: 25 March 2008 (Starbucks only); 14 April 2009
- Recorded: 30 October – 27 November 1969
- Genre: Folk rock
- Label: Columbia/Legacy
- Producer: Paul Simon, Art Garfunkel, Roy Halee

Simon and Garfunkel chronology
| The Collection: Simon & Garfunkel (2007) | Live 1969 (2008) | Simon & Garfunkel: The Complete Albums Collection (2014) |

Professional ratings
Review scores
| Source | Rating |
|---|---|
| Allmusic | link |
| Pitchfork Media | 7.9/10 link |

Live 1969 is the fourth live album by Simon & Garfunkel, released through Columbia Records. It consists of live recordings captured on the duo's final North American tour, prior to the release of their Bridge over Troubled Water album. Fifteen of the album's seventeen tracks are previously unreleased, with the exceptions being the live versions of "For Emily, Whenever I May Find Her" and "Kathy's Song", both of which initially appeared on Simon & Garfunkel's 1972 Greatest Hits album.

Live 1969 saw initial release as a Starbucks exclusive on March 25, 2008, preceding a full retail release on April 14, 2009. It was later included as the second disc in the 3-disc 40th Anniversary Edition of Bridge over Troubled Water in 2011, and then issued as part of Simon & Garfunkel: The Complete Albums Collection in 2014.

== Track listing ==
All tracks composed by Paul Simon, except where indicated.

1. "Homeward Bound" – 3:04 (11/15/69, Long Beach Arena, Long Beach, California)
2. "At the Zoo" – 2:07 (11/27/69, Carnegie Hall, New York City, New York)
3. "The 59th Street Bridge Song (Feelin' Groovy)" – 1:56 (11/8/69, Carbondale, Illinois)
4. "Song for the Asking" – 2:26 (11/15/69, Long Beach Arena, Long Beach, California)
5. "For Emily, Whenever I May Find Her" – 2:37 (November 1969, St. Louis, Missouri)
6. "Scarborough Fair/Canticle" (Paul Simon, Art Garfunkel) – 3:56 (11/28/69, Carnegie Hall, New York City, New York)
7. "Mrs. Robinson" – 4:44 (11/8/69, Carbondale, Illinois)
8. "The Boxer" – 4:46 (11/15/69, Long Beach Arena, Long Beach, California)
9. "Why Don't You Write Me" – 2:56 (11/15/69, Long Beach Arena, Long Beach, California)
10. "So Long, Frank Lloyd Wright" – 3:55 (11/8/69, Carbondale, Illinois)
11. "That Silver-Haired Daddy of Mine" (Jimmy Long, Gene Autry) – 3:11 (11/15/69, Long Beach Arena, Long Beach, California)
12. "Bridge over Troubled Water" – 5:25 (11/28/69, Carnegie Hall, New York City, New York)
13. "The Sound of Silence" – 3:52 (11/8/69, Carbondale, Illinois)
14. "I Am a Rock" – 3:36 (11/8/69, Carbondale, Illinois)
15. "Old Friends/Bookends Theme" – 3:22 (11/1/69, Toledo, Ohio)
16. "Leaves That Are Green" – 3:23 (10/30/69, Detroit, Michigan)
17. "Kathy's Song" – 3:53 (November 1969, St. Louis, Missouri)

Produced by Paul Simon, Art Garfunkel, Roy Halee

== Personnel ==
- Paul Simon – vocal, acoustic guitar
- Art Garfunkel – vocal
- Fred Carter Jr. – acoustic guitar, electric guitar
- Larry Knechtel – keyboards
- Joe Osborn – bass
- Hal Blaine – drums, congas
