= Rebekah Cauble =

American actress

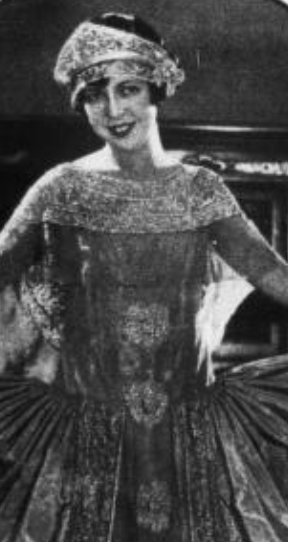
- Rebekah Cauble, from a 1924 publication
- Born: Rebekah Earle Cauble; May 8, 1901; Greenville, South Carolina
- Died: November 23, 1963; Long Beach, New York
- Other names: Becky Cauble, Rhea Cauble, Rebekah Faulkner, Rebekah Halee
- Occupation: Actress
- Children: 3, including Roy Halee

Rebekah Earle Cauble (May 8, 1901 – November 23, 1963), also known as Rhea Cauble and later as Rebekah Halee, was an American stage actress.

== Early life ==
Cauble was born in Greenville, South Carolina, the daughter of Charles L. Cauble and Felicia Folger Cauble. Her father, a railroad engineer, was killed in an accidental train derailment in 1905. She moved to Atlanta, then to New York in her youth. She attended Salem College, a Moravian women's school in Winston-Salem, North Carolina. Her older sister Miriam was also an actress, under the name "Muriel Folger" (using their mother's maiden name).

== Career ==
Cauble went to Cincinnati to gain theatre experience in a stock company as a young woman. While she was in Cincinnati, the teenaged Cauble was featured in a unique and successful fundraiser for the Cincinnati Zoological Gardens, when she was displayed in a cage as an "American Chicken".

Cauble appeared in the Broadway musicals My Lady's Glove (1917), Doing Our Bit (1917), Sinbad (1918), Tangerine (1921–1922) and Oh! Oh! Nurse (1925–1926). Other stage credits included roles in Jim Jam Jems (1921) and Little Jessie James (1924). "Miss Cauble possesses charm and personality combined with beauty of voice and is a dancer of ability," noted a 1926 report. Later in her career, Cauble performed on radio and television programs.

== Personal life ==
Cauble was engaged to her childhood friend, artist Alonzo C. Webb, in the early 1920s. She married twice; her first husband was David Clarkson Faulkner; they had one son. Her second husband was musician, composer and singer Royal Walter Halee; they had two children, including Roy D. Halee (a Grammy-winning recording engineer). Her husband died in 1960, and she died in 1963, aged 62 years, at Long Beach Memorial Hospital.
