= Mother and Child Reunion =

Single by Paul Simon

from the album Paul Simon
- B-side: "Paranoia Blues"
- Released: January 17, 1972
- Recorded: 1971
- Genre: Reggae rock
- Length: 3:05
- Label: Columbia
- Songwriter: Paul Simon
- Producers: Roy Halee; Paul Simon

Paul Simon singles chronology
| "I Am a Rock" (1965) | "Mother and Child Reunion" (1972) | "Me and Julio Down by the Schoolyard" (1972) |

"Mother and Child Reunion" is a song by the American singer-songwriter Paul Simon. It was the lead single from his second studio album, Paul Simon (1972), released on Columbia Records. The song reached No. 4 on the Billboard Hot 100 chart in March 1972.

== Background ==
It was, at the time, one of the few songs by a non-Jamaican musician to use prominent elements of reggae. Simon, who was a fan of reggae, listened to artists such as Jimmy Cliff, Desmond Dekker, and Byron Lee; he wanted to go to Kingston, Jamaica to record the song, as that was where Cliff had recorded his antiwar song "Vietnam" in 1970.

The title originates from a chicken-and-egg dish called "Mother and Child Reunion" that Simon saw on a Chinese restaurant's menu. The song's lyrics were inspired by a pet dog that was run over and killed. It was the first death Simon personally experienced, and he began to wonder how he would react if the same happened to his first wife, Peggy Harper. "Somehow there was a connection between this death and Peggy and it was like Heaven, I don't know what the connection was," Simon told Rolling Stone in 1972.

== Production ==
The song was recorded at Dynamic Sounds Studios at Torrington Bridge in Kingston, Jamaica, with Jimmy Cliff's backing group. Guitarist Huks ("Hux") Brown and bass guitarist Jackie Jackson were also long-time members of Toots & the Maytals. Cissy Houston sang background vocals on the recording. The song was recorded before writing lyrics, which was unusual for Simon. He had previously hoped to make "Why Don't You Write Me" – a song recorded with Art Garfunkel on Bridge over Troubled Water – sound like a Jamaican song, but felt it ended up sounding like a "bad imitation". Simon was instructed by the musicians on the differences among reggae, ska, and bluebeat. He felt awkward at first because he was "the only white guy there and I was American." The piano and vocals were overdubbed later in New York.

== Reception ==
Record World said that the song is "quintessential Simon lyrically, but his sound is decidedly more 'teenage.'" Cash Box said "Reggae sounds galore from Paul's debut as a solo. Quite different from S&G material, but most assuredly a future Top 10." Billboard characterized the song as an "infectious rhythm ballad with strong lyric[s]".

== Personnel ==
- Paul Simon – lead vocals
- Hux Brown – lead guitar
- Wallace Wilson – rhythm guitar
- Jackie Jackson – bass guitar
- Larry Knechtel – piano
- Neville Hinds – organ
- Winston Grennan – drums
- Denzil Laing – percussion
- Cissy Houston, Von Eva Sims, Renelle Stafford, Deirdre Tuck – backing vocals

== Chart history ==
"Mother and Child Reunion" was released as a single on February 5, 1972, reaching No. 1 in South Africa, No. 4 on the US Billboard Hot 100 chart, and No. 5 on the UK Singles Chart. Billboard ranked it as the No. 57 song for 1972.

=== Weekly charts ===
| Chart (1972) | Peak position |
|---|---|
| Australia (Go-Set) | 5 |
| Belgium (Ultratop 50 Flanders) | 20 |
| Canada Top Singles (RPM) | 5 |
| Finland (Suomen virallinen lista) | 19 |
| Germany (GfK) | 23 |
| Ireland (IRMA) | 15 |
| Israel (IBA) | 1 |
| Italy (Musica e dischi) | 25 |
| Netherlands (Single Top 100) | 6 |
| Norway (VG-lista) | 3 |
| New Zealand (Recorded Music NZ) | 33 |
| New Zealand (Listener) | 4 |
| South Africa Top 20 (Springbok/Radio Orion) | 1 |
| Spanish Singles Chart (PROMUSICAE) | 11 |
| Swedish Singles Chart (Kvällstoppen) | 8 |
| UK Singles (Official Charts Company) | 5 |
| US Billboard Hot 100 | 4 |
| US Billboard Adult Contemporary | 4 |
| US Cash Box Top 100 | 4 |
| Zimbabwe (ZIMA) | 1 |

=== Year-end charts ===
| Chart (1972) | Rank |
|---|---|
| South Africa | 9 |
| US Billboard Hot 100 | 57 |
| US Cash Box | 41 |

== Notes ==
=== Sources ===
- Bennighof, James (2007). The Words and Music of Paul Simon. Greenwood Publishing Group. ISBN 978-0-275-99163-0.
- Eliot, Marc (2010). Paul Simon: A Life. John Wiley and Sons. ISBN 978-0-470-43363-8.
