= Prairie House: Songs About Frank Lloyd Wright =

Compilation album by The Wright Street Band
- Released: 1988
- Length: 34:07
- Label: Wright-On Records

Prairie House: Songs About Frank Lloyd Wright is a thematic compilation album of nine songs as performed and recorded by The Wright Street Band. The songs depict many intriguing aspects of Frank Lloyd Wright's worldview via brief stories and vignettes. This music celebrates Wright design ideas and expresses appreciation for his work.

== Production ==
In the 1980s, tour guide Lawrence K. Jakus wrote all nine of these songs about Frank Lloyd Wright. John C. Smith and Doug Walder each collaborated with Larry on two songs. Doug Walder co-wrote the two songs, "A Bad Twist of Fate" and "Prairie House". John C. Smith co-wrote the two songs, "Frank Lloyd Wright the Architect" and "The Life of Frank Lloyd Wright". The entire nine song album was independently self-recorded (Wright-On Records) in 1988 by a three piece guitar band in a local Oak Park, Illinois recording studio.

Scott Beld of the band Ziggy and the ZEU was the featured lead vocalist on all tracks. Beld also played bass guitar on all nine songs. Jakus's cousin, drummer Bob Jakus, recruited Beld and bandmate (Cannibal, Kidd, One-Eyed Jacks, and Ziggy) guitarist Frank Wiencek to record these nine songs. Frank's stint with the One-Eyed Jacks included a period of time featuring Sly Stone.

While producing cassette tapes of the recording, in 1988, Lawrence K. Jakus also commissioned Joel Optholt, a local, Oak Park advertising artist, to create the artwork used on the Prairie House cassette cover and poster.

The Wright Street Band performed these songs live, accompanied by guitarist, singer/songwriter and collaborator, John C. Smith, at a record release party at the popular Berwyn, Illinois nightclub, Fitzgerald's on November 28, 1988. During the show, many photographic slides of Wright homes and designs were projected onstage. In addition and many popular songs that make use of the word "right" or "write" were also performed.

== Reception ==
At the time, the project received media recognition from The New York Times, Chicago Tribune, Oak Leaves, Wednesday Journal, Chicago Public Radio, and Wisconsin State Journal.

Architecture critic Paul Gapp reviewed Pairie House for the Sunday edition of the Chicago Tribune. According to Gapp, "This music is not for everybody, most particularly if they are the stuffy academic types who think Wright walked on water and consorted with a lot of women just to show them his etchings. But if you're a loose good humored architecture buff who simultaneously respects Wright's genius, you'll love it. Consider: You press the play button... and the first tune by The Wright Street Band comes on... It's set to twanging, banging, throbbing music and titled: 'Wright Rock and Roll'." In his review, reports "The Life of Frank Lloyd Wright", the biographical 12-verse song, "recounts just about everything joyful, sinful and sad that happened to the architect from the womb to the tomb." In addition to commenting on two more Wright songs in this article, "Prairie House" and "The Death of Frank Lloyd Wright", Gapp philosophizes "If you accept Goethe's definition of architecture as frozen music, you just might buy the metaphorical view that Larry Jakus has thawed it out, given it rock and reggae beats and created a hybrid new art form."

In a review for the Wednesday Journal Jakus's lyrics were described as "mostly humorous, sometimes witty and sometimes silly." In a review for Oak Leaves, a publication of the Chicago Pioneer Press, Jakus's nine song project about Frank Lloyd Wright was described as a result of inspiration the writer gained while learning about "America's premier architect, Frank Lloyd Wright," and as a result of the information he accumulated while studiously delving "into all the history and legend about this controversial designer", as he trained to become "a 'docent' or tour guide for the local Frank Lloyd Wright Home and Studio." The review noted that in his Wright songs, "Jakus explores Wright's considerable accomplishments, together with his equally outrageous pursuits ...". It continued "the most ambitious cut on the tape has to be 'The Life of Frank Lloyd Wright'", describing the lengthy, twelve verse, seven and a-half minute song as covering "most of the dirt about the man who has attracted millions to the Oak Park Home and Studio."

The Chicago Tribune remarked on the album as "unusual", describing the album as "no stuffy paean, the cassette includes such numbers as ... a 'country rap' song called 'The Death of Frank Lloyd Wright'" and said the cassette is a playful and witty treat. In a review the following year from The New York Times, it described the work and said "while Wright often compared architecture with music, this might not be quite the type he had in mind." The article remarked on three of the songs from the album, "The Life of Frank Lloyd Wright", "The Death of Frank Lloyd Wright", and "Reggae Wright".

Larry and Bob Jakus were also featured guests on a radio interview with Studs Terkel during a WFMT radio interview program on December 22, 1988. During this FM radio program, Studs interviewed both Larry Jakus, who wrote the nine songs and funded the recording project, and Larry's cousin Bob. During the interview, Studs played many songs from the cassette live, on-the-air, for his listeners to hear. The songs were aired between segments of conversation about the nine Wright songs. As he wrapped up the interview with Larry and Bob, and after having listened to many of the songs himself, Studs commented that Wright himself might prefer Larry Jakus' less tame, more roguish songs, in contrast to the Simon & Garfunkel song "So Long, Frank Lloyd Wright"; a song that also played on air during the interview.

== Track listing ==
No.	Title	Writer(s)	Length
1.	"Frank Lloyd Wright the Architect"	Lawrence Jakus, John C. Smith	3:37
2.	"The Death of Frank Lloyd Wright"	Lawrence Jakus	3:02
3.	"The Life of Frank Lloyd Wright"	Lawrence Jakus, John C. Smith	7:33
4.	"Prairie House"	Lawrence Jakus, Doug Walder	2:37
5.	"Reggae Wright"	Lawrence Jakus	4:26
6.	"The Frank Lloyd Wright Twist"	Lawrence Jakus	2:56
7.	"A Bad Twist of Fate"	Lawrence Jakus, Doug Walder	3:47
8.	"The Tour That Rocks the Nation"	Lawrence Jakus	2:39
9.	"Wright Rock and Roll"	Lawrence Jakus	3:30
Total length:			34:07
