= Bridge over Troubled Water =

1970 studio album by Simon & Garfunkel

Studio album by Simon & Garfunkel
- Released: January 26, 1970
- Recorded: November 1968 – November 1969
- Studios: Columbia Studio B and E, New York City; CBS Columbia Square, Los Angeles; Columbia Studio A, Nashville
- Genre: Folk rock
- Length: 36:56 (Original LP), 43:27 (CD w/ bonus tracks)
- Label: Columbia
- Producers: Paul Simon; Art Garfunkel; Roy Halee

Simon & Garfunkel chronology
Bookends (1968)	Bridge over Troubled Water (1970)	Simon and Garfunkel's Greatest Hits (1972)

Singles from Bridge over Troubled Water
- 1. "The Boxer" Released: March 21, 1969; 2. "Bridge over Troubled Water" Released: January 20, 1970; 3. "Cecilia" Released: April 20, 1970; 4. "El Condor Pasa (If I Could)" Released: September 1970

Bridge over Troubled Water is the fifth and final studio album by the American folk rock duo Simon & Garfunkel. The album was released on January 26, 1970 through Columbia Records. Following the duo's soundtrack for The Graduate, Art Garfunkel took an acting role in the film Catch-22, while Paul Simon worked on the songs, writing all tracks except Felice and Boudleaux Bryant's "Bye Bye Love" (previously a hit for the Everly Brothers).

With the help of producer Roy Halee, the album followed a similar musical pattern as their previous album Bookends (1968), partly abandoning their traditional style to incorporate elements of rock, R&B, gospel, jazz, world music, pop and other genres. It was described as their "most effortless record and their most ambitious." After Bridge over Troubled Water was released, several re-releases followed. The album was mixed and released in both stereo and quadraphonic. Columbia Records released a 40th Anniversary Edition on March 8, 2011, which includes two DVDs, including the politically themed TV special Songs of America (1969), the documentary The Harmony Game, additional liner notes and a booklet. Other reissues contain bonus tracks, such as the 2001 version, which covers the demo tapes of "Feuilles-O" and "Bridge over Troubled Water." Contemporary critical reception to Bridge was initially mixed, but retrospective reviews of the album have been laudatory, and it is considered by many to be the duo's best album.

Bridge over Troubled Water topped the charts in over ten countries and received six Grammy Awards at the 1971 Grammy Awards, including Album of the Year. The album has sold over 25 million copies worldwide, making it one of the best-selling albums of all time and at the time of its release, the best-selling album ever. It has been ranked on several "greatest" lists, including number 172 on Rolling Stone's list of the "500 Greatest Albums of All Time" in 2020. Despite the accolades, the duo decided to split up, and parted company later in 1970; Garfunkel continued his film career, while Simon worked intensely with music. Both artists released solo albums in the following years. Bridge includes two of the duo's most critically acclaimed and commercially successful songs, "Bridge over Troubled Water" and "The Boxer", which were listed on Rolling Stone's list of the "500 Greatest Songs of All Time."

== Background ==
Simon & Garfunkel were already successful in the music industry. Their Parsley, Sage, Rosemary and Thyme, the soundtrack album for Mike Nichols' film The Graduate and Bookends peaked at number four, one, and one in the US Billboard 200, respectively, with the former selling 3 million copies and the latter two selling 2 million copies each in the United States. Art Garfunkel took the role of Captain Nately in another Nichols film, Catch-22, based on the novel of the same name. Initially Paul Simon was to play the character of Dunbar, but screenwriter Buck Henry felt the film was already crowded with characters and subsequently wrote Simon's part out. The unexpectedly long film production endangered the relationship between the duo; Garfunkel later stated in a 1990 interview with Paul Zollo in SongTalk magazine: "Our way of working was for Paul to write while we recorded. So we'd be in the studio for the better part of two months working on the three or four songs that Paul had written, recording them, and when they were done, we'd knock off for a couple of months while Paul was working on the next group of three or four songs. Then we'd book time and be in the studio again for three or four months, recording those . . . . Rather than wait for Paul to write the next bunch of songs, I went off and did this movie."

== Content ==
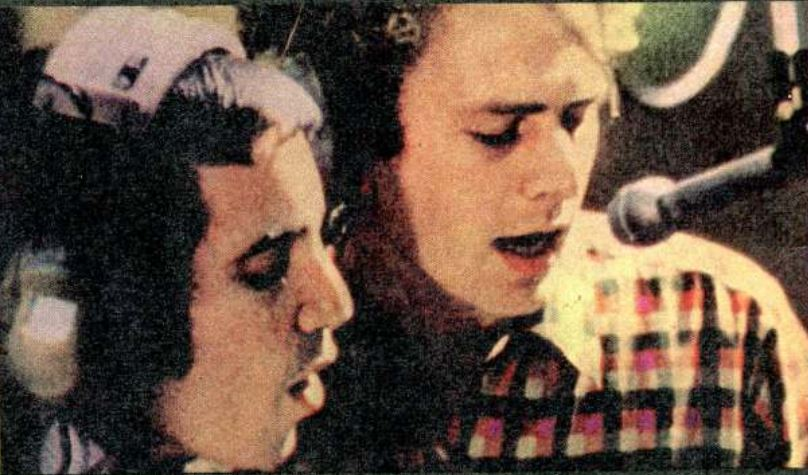
Simon & Garfunkel recording the album, November 1969

Garfunkel was involved in the filming of Catch-22 from January 1969 – this would continue for about eight months. Simon had not completed any new songs at this point; the duo planned to collaborate when the filming was finished. Roy Halee would produce the album; and, as was the case with their most recent studio album, Bookends, they wanted a new sound, moving away from typical folk rock.

Bridge over Troubled Water was the duo's first album to credit the backing musicians in the liner notes. The credited musicians, in addition to Simon, were Fred Carter Jr. on guitars, Hal Blaine on drums, Joe Osborn on bass, and Larry Knechtel on keyboards; all of whom were studio session musicians – later known as members of the Wrecking Crew. Because the duo were involved in recording the album, they declined invitations to perform, including at the Woodstock Festival.

=== Side one ===
Simon wanted a gospel piano sound on "Bridge over Troubled Water", so he hired session musician Larry Knechtel. The song was initially two verses long, but Garfunkel felt the song was too short and asked Knechtel to play a third verse, to which Simon would write more lyrics. Osborn played two bass guitar parts, one high and the other low. Blaine recorded the drums in an echo chamber, to achieve a hall effect. A horn section rounded off the track. Due to a series of factors, the duo had to work on a new tape; an arranger falsely labeled the song as "Like a Pitcher of Water" and wrote Garfunkel's name incorrectly (GarFunkel), and the string part was unsatisfactory.

The duo then returned to New York to record the vocals. The vocal style in "Bridge over Troubled Water" was inspired by Phil Spector's technique in "Old Man River" by the Righteous Brothers. After two months the song was finalized. Simon himself admitted that it sounded like the Beatles' "Let It Be", stating in a Rolling Stone interview: "They are very similar songs, certainly in instrumentation ..." The song has been covered by over 50 artists since then, including Elvis Presley and Johnny Cash.

"Bridge over Troubled Water" was influenced by the gospel music to which Simon was listening at that time, especially the Swan Silvertones and their song "Mary Don't You Weep". The name of the title track was inspired by the latter's line "I'll be your bridge over deep water, if you trust in my name". According to gospel producer and historian Anthony Heilbut, Simon later acknowledged his musical debt to Claude Jeter in person, and additionally handed Jeter a check as compensation. "Bridge over Troubled Water" was addressed to Simon's wife Peggy, whom he had met that year. The "silver girl" in the song refers to her, and her first gray hairs, and not to a drugged hypodermic needle, as was believed by some in the United States. Simon asked Garfunkel to sing lead on the song, and although Garfunkel initially refused this proposal and suggested that Simon should sing falsetto, later agreed to sing. Simon initially composed the song in G major, but arranger and composer Jimmie Haskell transposed the song to E-flat major to suit Garfunkel's voice.

"El Cóndor Pasa (If I Could)" is a Peruvian song based on traditional Andean music. Simon relied on erroneous information from Jorge Milchberg of Los Incas about the collection of royalties for his arrangement of song. Simon wrongfully thought it to be a traditional song and thus not restricted by copyright law, but in reality it was written by Peruvian Daniel Alomía Robles. His son Armando Robles Godoy filed a successful lawsuit later that year in 1970, saying he had held the song's copyright in the United States since his father's 1933 filing. Simon wrote English lyrics to the instrumental recording by Los Incas, and the song later became a forerunner of Simon's world music era as a solo artist.

In the summer of 1969, Simon, his wife Peggy and Garfunkel rented a house on Blue Jay Way in Los Angeles, as Garfunkel did not want to withdraw from Catch-22, which was being filmed on the West Coast. In this session, the duo experimented on a new song with numerous objects to create unusual sounds, such as a falling bundle of drum sticks. Garfunkel had a Sony reel-to-reel tape deck with a reverberation effect, so that each sound received an echo. When finished, Simon gave the tape to Halee, who then worked on the song, condensing sounds and copying them. The song features Simon as percussionist on the xylophone, an instrument he had never played before, and as acoustic guitarist. He began with a random line, "You're breaking my heart. I'm down on my knees," and when finished it was what later became "Cecilia". The drummer was again Blaine, and Simon's brother Eddie played on guitar. The song is about an unfaithful girl who invites another lover to her bed, while the singer (the first) is in the bathroom. David Browne suggested that the name may be derived from the patron of music, Saint Cecilia. It has an unusually fast tempo compared to their prior songs.

Featuring the rockabilly style of the Everly Brothers, "Keep the Customer Satisfied" recounts the exhausting tours that Simon grew tired of, a similar theme to that of their earlier song "Homeward Bound".

"So Long, Frank Lloyd Wright" is a tribute to the architect Frank Lloyd Wright but also to Garfunkel, who wanted to train as an architect. It chronicles the early career of the duo and predicts their future split up. At the end Halee shouts "So long already, Artie", a portentous message. Simon plays here a guitar style that has been described as Latin jazz and bossa nova. Congas additionally contribute to the South American sound.

=== Side two ===
The recordings for the folk ballad "The Boxer", which was already partly written by Simon in 1968 and released in March 1969 (it debuted on the WLS 89 Hit Parade at No. 38 on March 31, 1969), became one of the longest and toughest in the duo's career. The session lasted over 100 hours and took place at several locations. The second, main part was recorded in Nashville, at Columbia Studios, December 6–8, 1968. The third, final part and the horns were recorded inside St. Paul's Chapel at Columbia University (Garfunkel's alma mater), and the strings at Columbia Studios. The song features Simon and Fred Carter Jr. playing Martin guitars. The echoing drums were played by Blaine in an elevator shaft. Other instruments include Bob Moore playing double bass, tuba, Charlie McCoy playing harmonica, Pete Drake playing pedal steel guitar, Dobro and a piccolo flute. Simon & Garfunkel became the first musicians to use 16-track recording, but as only two 8-track recorders were available, both had to be carefully manually synchronized to produce a clear sound.

"Baby Driver", an uptempo and happy rock and roll song, already released as a B-side of "The Boxer", tells about a boy who lives a comfortable life in a protected home, but who searches for adventures and one day decides to have his first sexual experience. The recording features car noises, Beach Boys–like singing parts and absurd syllables. Edgar Wright's 2017 action comedy film Baby Driver is named after the song, which is played at the end credits.

Simon wrote "The Only Living Boy in New York" while Garfunkel was filming in Mexico; it is about the resulting isolation he felt in New York. In an interview with SongTalk, Simon guessed that 12 to 15 voices were used to record the "aaah"s, while Garfunkel said that he proposed those lines, stating "It's us around eight times screaming, and we mixed it down very softly ... I started getting into open-mouth harmony, in a very loud, strident way. We were screaming at the top of our lungs and inside an echo chamber. I remember that day that Dylan dropped by to visit. We came out of the booth after all this screaming, and there he was."

In "Why Don't You Write Me", Simon experimented with the nascent genre of reggae for the first time, a style he later explored in his solo career, most notably in "Mother and Child Reunion".

The Everly Brothers' "Bye Bye Love" had been recorded live, but Simon, Garfunkel, and Halee were not satisfied with the performances. The song was subsequently recorded in the studio and the recording played to various audiences to clap along to. "Bye Bye Love" became a farewell song and a sign of a new career.

The album's final song, "Song for the Asking", represents an "olive branch" extended by the duo to each other and holding open the possibility of reconciliation and further collaboration. The song starts with the applauses of the previous song cross-fading into it.

== Releases ==
After breaking for Christmas, the duo continued working on the album in early 1970 and finished it in late January. Eleven tracks were featured on this album; one finished song, "Cuba Si, Nixon No", as well as other additional tracks were excluded. Garfunkel did not like this song and proposed instead a chorale, entitled "Feuilles-O", with which Simon disagreed. After a discussion, they decided to not include more tracks.

Bridge over Troubled Water charted in over 11 countries, topping the charts in 10 countries, including the US Billboard 200 and the UK Albums Chart. It was the best-selling album in 1970, 1971 and 1972 and was at that time the best-selling album of all time. It remained CBS Records' best-selling album until the release of Michael Jackson's Thriller in 1982. The album topped the Billboard 200 charts for 10 weeks and stayed on the charts for 85 weeks. According to Columbia Records, 1.7 million copies were sold in the first three weeks in the United States. In the United Kingdom, the album topped the charts for 33 weeks, and spent 285 weeks in the top 100, from 1970 to 1975. Furthermore, it received 8× Platinum by the Recording Industry Association of America (RIAA), and 4× Platinum in Canada. Bridge over Troubled Water has since sold 3,163,789 copies in the UK, and over 25 million copies worldwide.

The songs "Cuba Si, Nixon No", "Groundhog", and the demo "Feuilles-O" were recorded during sessions but not released on the album. "Cuba Si, Nixon No" was later released on a bootleg recording of a concert of November 11, 1969, by Simon and Garfunkel at Miami University in Oxford, Ohio, while the demo recording of "Feuilles-O" was later released on the Old Friends and The Columbia Studio Recordings (1964–1970) box sets. A remastered and expanded version of the album was released on compact disc in 2001, containing the demo versions of "Feuilles-O" and "Bridge over Troubled Water." It was remastered by Vic Anesini. Garfunkel later recorded "Feuilles-Oh/Do Space Men Pass Dead Souls on Their Way to the Moon?" on his debut solo album Angel Clare, and as the flip-side to his single, "I Shall Sing", from the same album.

Columbia Records released a 40th Anniversary Edition on March 8, 2011, comprising three discs. The first disc features the original album and the second disc contains the entirety of Live 1969, which had been released three years earlier as an exclusive at Starbucks. The third disc, a DVD, consisted of the television special Songs of America, which originally aired in 1969 on CBS and unavailable since its original broadcast, and a new documentary The Harmony Game about the making of the album. Songs of America comprised footage of the 1969 tour, intimate backstage conversations, and historic news clips; it had elicited controversy owing to the duo's political comments regarding the Vietnam War and the direction of American society at the time. The Harmony Game featured new 2010 interviews with Simon, Garfunkel, producer Roy Halee, and more principals involved with the making of the album. The 1969 special runs for approximately 52 minutes 37 seconds, while the 2010 documentary runs for approximately 70 minutes 54 seconds. A booklet of liner notes, photos, and essays by critics Michael Hill and Anthony DeCurtis was also included.

The album is also included in its entirety as part of the Simon & Garfunkel box sets Collected Works, The Columbia Studio Recordings (1964–1970) and Simon & Garfunkel: The Complete Albums Collection.

== Reception and legacy ==
Retrospective professional ratings
Review scores
Source	Rating
AllMusic	5/5 stars
American Songwriter	5/5 stars
Blender	4/5 stars
Encyclopedia of Popular Music	4/5 stars
Entertainment Weekly	A−
Pitchfork	9.4/10
Q	4/5 stars
Record Collector	4/5 stars
Rolling Stone	5/5 stars
Uncut	3/5 stars

Bridge over Troubled Water was originally released to a mixed critical response. Writing in Melody Maker in February 1970, Richard Williams identified "a few dull moments" on the album, while adding that "they're worth enduring for the jewels they surround". Williams concluded: "Not, perhaps, another classic like Bookends, but still worth hearing for Simon's constantly surprising timing, and for the way he can make his guitar sound like a small orchestra and the orchestra sound like a big guitar ..." Village Voice critic Robert Christgau was lukewarm about the album in 1970, giving it a "B" grade in his "Consumer Guide" column and notoriously reviewing it with one word: "Melodic". He later expounded on the problematic nature of the record's "smooth, well made" music, writing in Newsday that the album is "often funny and honest. It breathes life. Yet I suspect that its flawless, rather languid loveliness is ultimately soporific". According to Steve Horowitz of PopMatters, contemporary critics compared the album to the Beatles' White Album "in that one can hear the incipient break up of the band in the way they separately perform the material".

Among retrospective reviews, Bruce Eder of AllMusic said that Bridge over Troubled Water was "perhaps the most delicately textured album to close out the 1960s from any major rock act", especially in a time of troubles in the United States. Parke Puterbaugh of Rolling Stone assessed the album as "a casually ambitious look back" at both the decade and the duo's musical partnership, which concluded the latter "on an exhilarating note". Author and critic David Browne noted the album's "sonic warmth and richness". Stephen M. Deusner of Pitchfork praised its unique sound, writing that "Bridge sounds like a unified statement enlivened by styles and rhythms not often heard on pop radio at the juncture of [the 1960s and 1970s]."

In a 2001 review for Uncut, Ian MacDonald found the album "overproduced and underwritten", adding: "Where Bookends is succinct, dry, and disciplined, Bridge ... is self-satisfied, sentimental, mediocre, and overblown. Even its best song, 'The Boxer', is needlessly inflated and protracted." Writing for MusicHound, Leland Rucker acknowledged that Bridge over Troubled Water "is considered their masterpiece", while noting that he found that "it sounds top-heavy, overproduced, and too precious for its own good." Conversely, Q magazine deemed the album to be Simon & Garfunkel's best and most consistent work, "notable for the strength of its melodies, the force of its lyrics and the Abbey Road-style sophistication of its production". In his book The Encyclopedia of Popular Music, Colin Larkin admires the album as a "celebrated" work that includes a "classic single" ("The Boxer") and a title song that "became a standard with Garfunkel's angelic vocal set perfectly matched to the lush, orchestral arrangement and contrasting tempo". Joe Nolan of American Songwriter notes that "the pair were never more popular or commercially successful than they were with the release of Bridge over Troubled Water".

Bridge over Troubled Water won the Grammy Award for Album of the Year, as well as for Best Engineered Recording, while its title track won the Grammys for Record of the Year, Song of the Year, Best Contemporary Song and Best Arrangement Accompanying Vocalist(s) in 1971. Bridge over Troubled Water was nominated at the first Brit Awards for Best International Album and its title track for Best International Single in 1977. In 2000 it was voted number 66 in Colin Larkin's All Time Top 1000 Albums. In 2003, it was ranked at No. 51 on Rolling Stone's 500 Greatest Albums of All Time, maintaining the rating in a 2012 revised list; in a 2020 revision, the album was ranked at No. 172. In December 1993, The Times ranked the album at number 20 on its "The Vultures 100 Best Albums of all Time". The album was also included in the book 1001 Albums You Must Hear Before You Die.

Chris Charlesworth, author of The Complete Guide to the Music of Paul Simon and Simon & Garfunkel, gave a mixed reception, noting that seven songs ("Bridge over Troubled Water", "El Condor Pasa", "So Long, Frank Lloyd Wright", "The Boxer", "The Only Living Boy in New York", "Bye Bye Love" and "Song for the Asking") were outstanding or good, while the rest, mainly uptempo ones, were for him "throwaway" recordings. He was surprised at its success.

=== Aftermath ===
After Bridge over Troubled Water, both musicians became more independent. Garfunkel took a role in another Mike Nichols film, Carnal Knowledge, in the role of Sandy, for which he later earned a Golden Globe for Best Supporting Actor nomination. Filming started in May 1970. Meanwhile, Simon taught a one-week songwriting course at New York University, studied music theory and listened to numerous types of music. The duo's last performance at that time was in the Forest Hills Stadium on July 18, 1970. Simon worked on his second studio (and first post-Simon & Garfunkel) solo album between January and March 1971, which was later released as Paul Simon, while Garfunkel revived his music career with Angel Clare, released in September 1973.

== Track listing ==
All tracks are written by Paul Simon except where noted.

Side one
No.	Title	Writer(s)	Recorded	Length
1.	"Bridge over Troubled Water"		Fall 1969	4:52
2.	"El Cóndor Pasa (If I Could)"	Daniel Alomía Robles, arranged by Jorge Milchberg and English lyrics by Paul Simon	1969	3:06
3.	"Cecilia"		1969	2:55
4.	"Keep the Customer Satisfied"		July 29 and October 27, 1969	2:33
5.	"So Long, Frank Lloyd Wright"		November 9, 1969	3:41
Total length:				17:07

Side two
No.	Title	Writer(s)	Recorded	Length
1.	"The Boxer"		December 1968	5:08
2.	"Baby Driver"		November 19, 1968	3:14
3.	"The Only Living Boy in New York"		June 13 and July 29, 1969	3:58
4.	"Why Don't You Write Me"		June 10–13, 1969	2:45
5.	"Bye Bye Love" (studio recording with live clapping)	Felice Bryant, Boudleaux Bryant	Fall 1969	2:55
6.	"Song for the Asking"		November 1, 1969	1:49
Total length:				19:49 36:56

2001 CD reissue bonus tracks
No.	Title	Writer(s)	Recorded	Length
12.	"Feuilles-O" (demo)	Traditional; arranged by Simon, Art Garfunkel	August 11, 1969	1:45
13.	"Bridge over Troubled Water" (demo take 6)		August 13, 1969	4:46
Total length:				6:31 43:27

== Personnel ==
- Paul Simon – vocals, acoustic guitar, percussion, producer
- Art Garfunkel – vocals, percussion, producer
- Fred Carter Jr. – guitar
- Hal Blaine – drums
- Joe Osborn – bass guitar
- Larry Knechtel – piano
- Jimmie Haskell and Ernie Freeman – strings
- Los Incas – Peruvian instruments
- Bob Moore – double bass
- Pete Drake – Dobro, pedal steel guitar
- Charlie McCoy – bass harmonica on "The Boxer"
- Jon Faddis, Randy Brecker, Lew Soloff and Alan Rubin – Brass
- Roy Halee – engineer and co-producer

== Charts ==
=== Weekly charts ===
Chart	Peak position
Australian Kent Music Report Chart	1
Austrian Albums Chart	1
Brazilian Albums Chart	9
Canadian RPM Albums Chart	1
Danish Albums Chart	2
Dutch Mega Albums Chart	1
French SNEP Albums Chart	1
German Media Control Albums Chart	1
Israeli Albums Chart	2
Italian Albums Chart	7
Japanese Oricon LP Chart	1
Norwegian VG-lista Albums Chart	1
Spanish Album Charts	1
Swedish Albums Chart	1
UK Albums Chart	1
US Billboard 200	1

=== 40th Anniversary Edition ===
Chart (2011)	Position
Belgian Albums Chart (Flanders)	43
Belgian Albums Chart (Wallonia)	33
Dutch Mega Albums Chart	29
French SNEP Albums Chart	152
Spanish Albums Chart	70
Japanese Oricon Albums Chart	25
Norwegian VG-lista Albums Chart	22
UK Albums Chart	47
US Billboard 200	167
US Billboard Top Catalog Albums	19

=== Year-end charts ===
Chart (1970)	Position
Australian Albums Chart	1
French Albums Chart	1
Japanese Albums Chart	6
UK Albums Chart	1
US Billboard Pop Albums	1
Chart (1971)	Position
Australian Albums Chart	23
German Albums (Offizielle Top 100)	45
Japanese Albums Chart	2
US Billboard Pop Albums	55
UK Albums Chart	1
Chart (1972)	Position
UK Albums Chart	6
Chart (1975)	Position
UK Albums (OCC)	36

=== Decade-end charts ===
Chart (1970–79)	Position
UK Albums Chart	1

=== Singles ===
Single	Chart	Position
"Bridge over Troubled Water"	Australian Kent Music Report Chart	2
"Bridge over Troubled Water"	Austrian Ö3 Top 40 Chart	4
"Bridge over Troubled Water"	Dutch Mega Albums Chart	5
"Bridge over Troubled Water"	Norwegian VG-lista Albums Chart	7
"Bridge over Troubled Water"	UK Singles Chart	1
"Bridge over Troubled Water"	US Billboard Hot 100	1
"Bridge over Troubled Water"	US Billboard Adult Contemporary Chart	1
"Bridge over Troubled Water"	German Media Control Albums Chart	3
"Cecilia"	Australian Kent Music Report Chart	6
"Cecilia"	Austrian Ö3 Top 40 Chart	6
"Cecilia"	Dutch Mega Albums Chart	1
"Cecilia"	US Billboard Hot 100	4
"Cecilia"	German Media Control Albums Chart	2
"El Condor Pasa (If I Could)"	Australian Kent Music Report Chart	1
"El Condor Pasa (If I Could)"	Austrian Ö3 Top 40 Chart	1
"El Condor Pasa (If I Could)"	Dutch Mega Albums Chart	1
"El Condor Pasa (If I Could)"	US Billboard Hot 100	18
"El Condor Pasa (If I Could)"	US Billboard Adult Contemporary Chart	6
"El Condor Pasa (If I Could)"	German Media Control Albums Chart	1

== Certifications and sales ==
Region	Certification	Certified units/sales
Australia (ARIA)	Gold	70,000
Austria (IFPI Austria)	Platinum	50,000^{*}
Canada (Music Canada)	4× Platinum	400,000^{^}
Denmark (IFPI Danmark)	Gold	10,000^{‡}
Finland (Musiikkituottajat)	Gold	25,000
France (SNEP)	Platinum	300,000^{*}
Germany (BVMI)	Platinum	500,000^{^}
Japan	—	441,000
Netherlands	—	750,000
South Africa	—	96,000
Spain	—	50,000
Sweden	—	200,000
Switzerland (IFPI Switzerland)	Gold	25,000^{^}
United Kingdom (BPI)	11× Platinum	3,300,000^{‡}
United States (RIAA)	8× Platinum	8,000,000^{^}
Summaries
Worldwide	—	25,000,000
^{*} Sales figures based on certification alone.^{^} Shipments figures based on certification alone.^{‡} Sales+streaming figures based on certification alone.

== Bibliography ==
- Bennighof, James (2007). The Words and Music of Paul Simon. Greenwood Publishing Group. ISBN 978-0-275-99163-0.
- Browne, David (2012). Fire and Rain: The Beatles, Simon and Garfunkel, James Taylor, CSNY, and the Lost Story of 1970. Da Capo Press. ISBN 978-0-306-82072-4.
- Charlesworth, Chris (1997). "Bridge over Troubled Water". The Complete Guide to the Music of Paul Simon and Simon & Garfunkel. Omnibus Press. ISBN 0-7119-5597-2.
- Denisoff, R. Serge (1988). Inside MTV. Transaction Publishers. ISBN 978-0-88738-864-4.
- Ebel, Roswitha (2004). Paul Simon: seine Musik, sein Leben [Paul Simon: His Music, His Life] (in German). epubli. ISBN 978-3-937729-00-8.
- Eliot, Marc (2010). Paul Simon: A Life. John Wiley and Sons. ISBN 978-0-470-43363-8.
- Fornatale, Pete (2007). Simon and Garfunkel's Bookends. Rodale. ISBN 978-1-59486-427-8.
- Humphries, Patrick (1982). Bookends: The Simon and Garfunkel Story. Proteus Books.
- Kingston, Victoria (2000). Simon & Garfunkel: The Biography. Fromm International. ISBN 978-0-88064-246-0.
- Larkin, Colin (2000). All Time Top 1000 Albums (3rd ed.). Virgin Books. ISBN 0-7535-0493-6.
- Larkin, Colin (2011). "Simon and Garfunkel". The Encyclopedia of Popular Music (5th concise ed.). London: Omnibus Press. ISBN 978-0-85712-595-8.
- Morella, Joe; Barey, Patricia (1991). Simon and Garfunkel: Old Friends. Carol Publishing Group. ISBN 978-1-55972-089-2.
- Rucker, Leland (1999). "Simon & Garfunkel". In Graff, Gary; Durchholz, Daniel (eds.). MusicHound Rock: The Essential Album Guide. Farmington Hills: Visible Ink Press. ISBN 1-57859-061-2.
