= Paul Simon (album) =

Studio album by Paul Simon
- Released: January 24, 1972
- Recorded: January–March 1971
- Studios: CBS (San Francisco); CBS (New York City); Western (Hollywood); Dynamic Sound (Kingston); Studio CBE (Paris)
- Genres: Folk rock; pop
- Length: 34:03
- Labels: Columbia; Warner Bros.
- Producers: Roy Halee; Paul Simon

Paul Simon chronology
The Paul Simon Songbook (1965)	Paul Simon (1972)	There Goes Rhymin' Simon (1973)

Singles from Paul Simon
- 1. "Mother and Child Reunion" b/w "Paranoia Blues" Released: 17 January 1972; 2. "Me and Julio Down by the Schoolyard" b/w "Congratulations" Released: May 1972; 3. "Duncan" b/w "Run That Body Down" Released: July 1972

Paul Simon is the second solo studio album by American singer-songwriter Paul Simon. It was released in January 1972, nearly two years after he split up with longtime musical partner Art Garfunkel. His first solo album, recorded in England in 1965, remained unreleased in the U.S. (except for a brief period in 1969) until 1981, when it appeared in the 5-LP Collected Works boxed set. Originally released on Columbia Records, Paul Simon was later issued under the Warner Bros. label and has since returned to Columbia through Sony. The album topped the charts in the United Kingdom, Japan, and Norway and reached No. 4 on the U.S. Billboard Pop Albums. It was certified platinum in 1986.

== History and composition ==
After Simon & Garfunkel's acrimonious breakup, Paul Simon taught songwriting classes at New York University during the summer of 1971. Among his students were two of the Roche sisters, Maggie and Terre, and singer-songwriter Melissa Manchester, who recalls that Simon was nervous, listened to the students' songs and offered suggestions and criticism, often dissecting the lyrics and drawing comparisons with his own work while offering insights into his own creative process and sources of inspiration.

In a 1972 interview with Rolling Stone magazine, Paul Simon stated that one of his primary goals during the recording of the album was to move beyond the musical style he had become associated with during the 1960s. "I didn't want to sing 'Scarborough Fair' again", he told Jon Landau. As a result, the album is characterized by a more understated production compared to his past records with Art Garfunkel, with Simon's guitar and vocals taking center stage. It also incorporates a wide variety of musical genres, including Latin music, jazz, blues, and reggae, showcasing an eclecticism that foreshadows his later exploration of world music on his acclaimed 1986 Graceland album.

This stylistic diversity resulted in contributions from several notable guest musicians, including violinist Stéphane Grappelli (featured on "Hobo's Blues", for which he is credited as a co-writer), jazz bassist Ron Carter (on "Run That Body Down"), and percussionist Airto Moreira (on "Me and Julio Down by the Schoolyard", where he plays the cuica). The album was recorded in a variety of locations, such as San Francisco, New York City, Los Angeles, Paris, and Kingston, Jamaica. The latter was where the recording of "Mother and Child Reunion", considered one of the first songs by a non-Jamaican musician to feature elements of reggae music, took place. Released as a single, it became the album's biggest hit, reaching No. 4 on the Billboard Hot 100 chart in March 1972.

The lyrics throughout the album are also marked by variety, with Paul Simon's songwriting shifting between lighthearted and solemn moods, blending humor and biting irony with melancholy and uncertainty. On one hand, songs like "Duncan", whose protagonist leaves his life in the rural Canadian Maritime Provinces in search of what Rob Sheffield describes as "a romantic Dylan/Kerouac adventure"; "Me and Julio Down by the Schoolyard", set in the multicultural New York City neighborhood of Corona, Queens; and "Papa Hobo", featuring a down-on-his-luck homeless man from Detroit, each contribute a unique character to the album's diverse cast, allowing Simon to explore themes such as youth and self-discovery, the political and social turbulence of the late 1960s and the counterculture that emerged in response, and the daily lives and struggles of disenfranchised groups within American society. On the other hand, heartbreak and bitterness over the collapse of a relationship emerge as significant themes as well, with several songs referencing, either directly ("Run That Body Down", in which "Paul" and "Peg" are mentioned by name) or indirectly ("Congratulations"), Simon's troubled marriage to Peggy Harper, which ultimately ended in divorce in 1975.

== Release and reception ==
Retrospective professional ratings
Review scores
Source	Rating
AllMusic	5/5 stars
Blender	5/5 stars
Chicago Tribune	4/4 stars
Christgau's Record Guide	A+
The Encyclopedia of Popular Music	4/5 stars
Entertainment Weekly	A
The Guardian	4/5 stars
Record Collector	4/5 stars
The Rolling Stone Album Guide	5/5 stars
Uncut	4/5 stars

Released on January 24, 1972, the album arrived at a time when, following the dissolution of the duo that made him famous, Paul Simon was considered to be at a disadvantage, with many seeing him as the underdog. This sentiment was echoed by Columbia Records president Clive Davis, who told Simon, "[Simon & Garfunkel] is a household word. No matter however successful you'll be, you'll never be as successful as S&G", to which Simon responded, "Yeah, like Dean Martin and Jerry Lewis". Despite these doubts, the album became a major commercial success against all odds, peaking at number 4 on the Billboard 200 on April 1, 1972, and eventually earning a Platinum certification by the Recording Industry Association of America.

In a 1972 review for The Village Voice, Robert Christgau stated, "this is the only thing in the universe to make me positively happy in the first two weeks of February 1972." That same year, writing for Rolling Stone, Jon Landau described it as Simon's "least detached, most personal and painful piece of work thus far — this from a lyricist who has never shied away from pain as subject or theme." In a 2022 article written on the occasion of the album's fiftieth anniversary, Rob Sheffield called it "the funniest, nastiest, leanest, meanest, and possibly weirdest masterpiece of his great career", adding that, "for some fans, including this one, it’s the best album he’s ever made, with or without the other guy".

Critical praise for the album was widespread, though some reviewers were less enthusiastic. Noel Coppage, writing in Stereo Review, called it "undistinguished" and added, "I gather...this album is merely Simon's way of keeping his hand in while Garfunkel makes movies....I'm now wondering if Garfunkel's arranging work doesn't include sending Simon back to rewrite some of his songs before recording them." Despite Coppage's critical panning, other Stereo Review critics went on to award the album one of its "Record of the Year" honors.

The album was ranked number 268 on Rolling Stone's 2012 list of the 500 Greatest Albums of All Time, and number 425 in the 2020 update. It was ranked number 984 in All-Time Top 1000 Albums (3rd. edition, 2000).

== Track listing ==
All songs written by Paul Simon, except "Hobo's Blues" co-written by Stéphane Grappelli.

Side one
No.	Title	Length
1.	"Mother and Child Reunion"	3:05
2.	"Duncan"	4:39
3.	"Everything Put Together Falls Apart"	1:59
4.	"Run That Body Down"	3:52
5.	"Armistice Day"	3:55
Total length:		17:30

Side two
No.	Title	Length
6.	"Me and Julio Down by the Schoolyard"	2:42
7.	"Peace Like a River"	3:20
8.	"Papa Hobo"	2:34
9.	"Hobo's Blues"	1:21
10.	"Paranoia Blues"	2:54
11.	"Congratulations"	3:42
Total length:		16:33 34:03

== Personnel ==
Track numbering refers to CD and digital releases of this album.

- Paul Simon – vocals, acoustic guitar, percussion (10)
- Neville Hinds – organ (1)
- Larry Knechtel – acoustic piano (1, 11), Wurlitzer electric piano (3, 11), harmonium (3, 8), organ (11)
- Hux Brown – lead guitar (1)
- Wallace Wilson – rhythm guitar (1)
- Los Incas – charango (2), percussion (2), flute (2)
- Jerry Hahn – electric guitar (4, 5)
- David Spinozza – acoustic guitar (4, 6)
- Stefan Grossman – bottleneck guitar (10)
- Jackie Jackson – bass guitar (1)
- Ron Carter – double bass (4)
- Russell George – bass guitar (6)
- Joe Osborn – bass guitar (7, 11)
- Winston Grennan – drums (1)
- Hal Blaine – drums (4, 10, 11)
- Denzil Laing – percussion (1)
- Mike Mainieri – vibraphone (4)
- Airto Moreira – percussion (5, 6)
- Victor Montanez – congas (7)
- Fred Lipsius – alto saxophone (5)
- John Schroer – tenor saxophone (5), baritone saxophone (10)
- Steve Turre – trombone (10)
- Charlie McCoy – bass harmonica (8)
- Stéphane Grappelli – violin (9)
- Cissy Houston – backing vocals (1)
- Von Eva Sims – backing vocals (1)
- Renelle Stafford – backing vocals (1)
- Deirdre Tuck – backing vocals (1)

== Production ==
- Paul Simon – producer, arrangements
- Roy Halee – co-producer, engineer (1–5, 7–10)
- Phil Ramone – engineer (6)
- Bernard Estardy – additional engineer (2)
- George Horn – mastering at CBS Studios (San Francisco, California)
- Leslie Kong – music contractor (1)
- John Berg – design
- Ron Coro – design
- P.A. Harper – photography

== Charts ==
=== Weekly charts ===
Chart (1972)	Position
Australian Kent Music Report Albums Chart	5
Canadian RPM Albums Chart	2
Dutch Mega Albums Chart	2
Finnish Albums Chart	1
Japanese Oricon LPs Chart	1
Norwegian VG-lista Albums Chart	1
Spanish Albums Chart	3
Swedish Albums Chart	1
UK Albums Chart	1
US Billboard Pop Albums	4
West German Media Control Albums Chart	37
Zimbabwean Albums Chart	14

=== Year-end charts ===
Chart (1972)	Position
Australian Albums Chart	22
Dutch Albums Chart	26
Japanese Albums Chart	10
U.S. Top Pop Albums	32

=== Certifications ===
Region	Certification	Certified units/sales
United States (RIAA)	Platinum	1,000,000^{^}
^{^} Shipments figures based on certification alone.

== See also ==
- Biography Paul Simon and Garfunkel
- Allmusic entry
