= Tom & Jerry (album) =

Compilation album by Simon & Garfunkel
- Released: 2002
- Genre: Folk
- Label: Superior Records

Simon & Garfunkel chronology
Live from New York City, 1967 (2002)	Tom & Jerry (2002)	The Essential Simon & Garfunkel (2003)

Tom & Jerry is a compilation album by Simon & Garfunkel released in 2002. This album contains songs in their early career, when they were known as Tom & Jerry.

== Track listing ==
1. "Dream Alone"
2. "Beat Love"
3. "Beat Love" (With Harmony)
4. "Just a Boy"
5. "Play Me a Sad Song"
6. "It Means a Lot to Them"
7. "Flame"
8. "Shy"
9. "The Lone Teen Ranger"
10. "Hey Schoolgirl"
11. "Our Song"
12. "That's My Story"
13. "Teenage Fool"
14. "Tia-Juana Blues"
15. "Dancin' Wild"
16. "Don't Say Goodbye"
17. "Two Teenagers"
18. "True or False"
19. "Simon Says"

== Personnel ==
- Séamus Egan – Liner notes
- Paul Simon – Vocals, Guitar
- Art Garfunkel – Vocals
