= Los Incas =

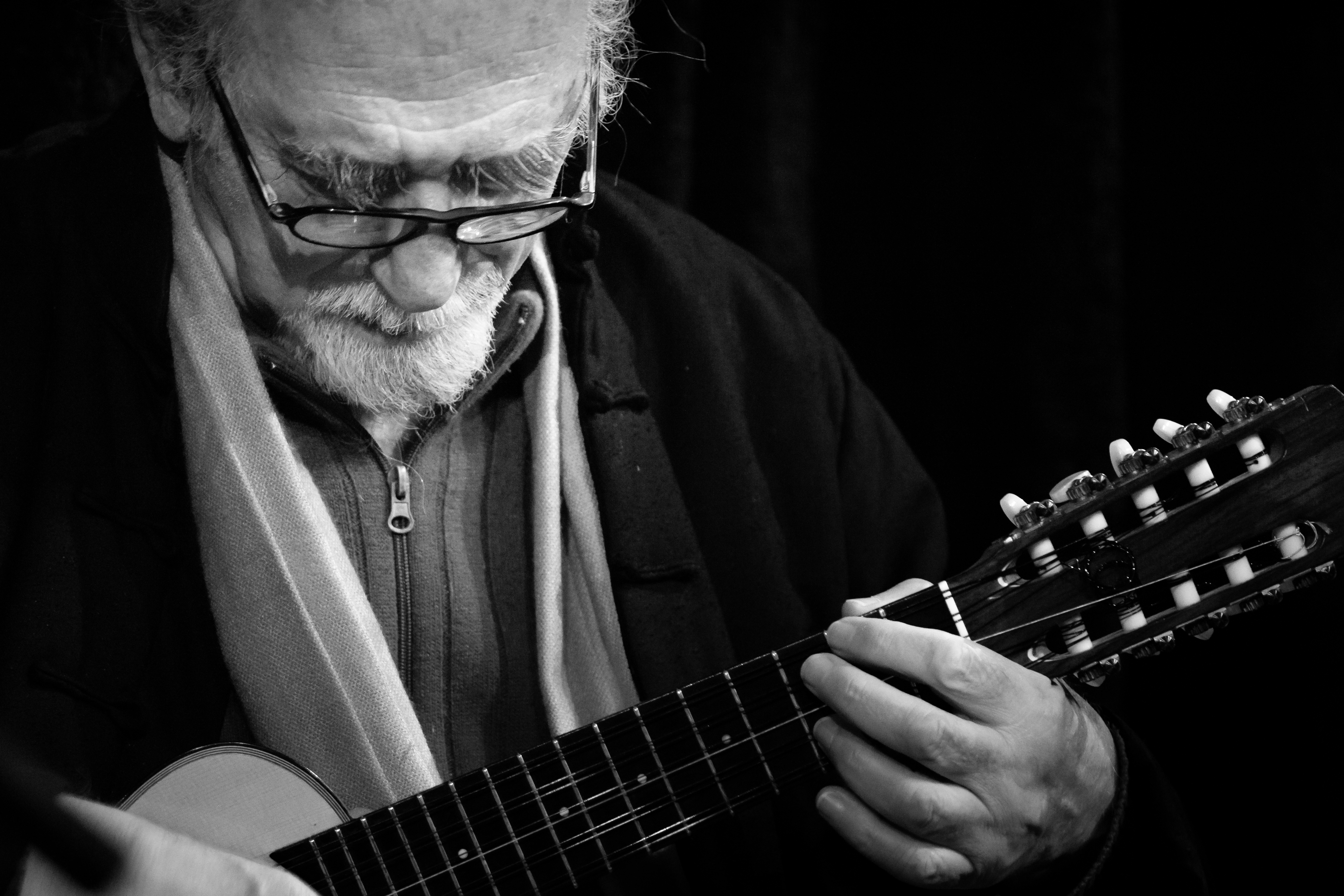
- Jorge Milchberg in Buenos Aires on 2 November 2014

Background information
- Also known as: El Inca; Urubamba
- Origin: Paris, France
- Genre: Andean rock
- Occupation: Musician
- Years active: 1956–present

Los Incas, also known as Urubamba, are an Andean folk music group formed in Paris in 1956. Founded by the Argentine musicians Carlos Miguel Ben-Pott and Ricardo Galeazzi who was a jazz bassist, musical director of the group and the Venezuelans Elio Riveros and Narciso Debourg. Since the beginning of the 1960s, it had been constantly directed musically by the Argentine Jorge Milchberg (born 5 September 1928 - died 20 August 2022), who, originally a classically trained pianist, had become an internationally renowned charanguist.

They are best known in North America for accompanying Simon and Garfunkel on the song "El Cóndor Pasa (If I Could)", written by Daniel Alomía Robles, Paul Simon and Jorge Milchberg and included on the duo's fifth album, Bridge Over Troubled Water.

Later on, they provided accompaniment on "Duncan", featured on Simon's second solo album Paul Simon, and toured with Simon (as Urubamba) in the early 1970s, appearing on the Live Rhymin' album and releasing a pair of albums under their new name. In later years, they reverted to their original name of Los Incas and released several more albums on the French Buda Records label.

== Members ==
- Jorge Milchberg — charango
- Rob Yaffee — cello
- Olivier Milchberg — guitar, quena
- Lupe Vega — vocals
- Juan Dalera — quena
- Moises Arnaiz — guitar
- Jorge Trasante — percussion
- Carlos Miguel Benn
- Kleber Mosquera — guitar

== Discography ==
- Chants et Danses d'Amérique Latine, 1956
- L'Amérique du Soleil, 1960
- Terres de Soleil, 1962
- Amérique Latine, 1964
- Special Danse (EP), 1965
- Bolivie, 1965
- Pérou, 1965
- Succés Originaux, 1967
- Le Rapace (EP), 1967
- Los Incas, 1968
- Inedits, 1969
- El Cóndor Pasa, 1970
- El Viento, 1971
- Special Danse (EP 2), 1972
- La Fiesta, 1973
- Urubamba (as Urubamba), 1974
- Río Abierto, 1977
- Un Pedazo de Infinito (as Urubamba), 1982
- La Porte du Silence, 1985
- Alegria, 1988
- La Plume de l'Oeuf, 1991
- Los Incas en Concert, 2000 (Live Album)
- El Último, 2002
- Salvados del Olvido, 2011
- Reprise en ligne (EP), 2018
