= So Long, Frank Lloyd Wright =

Song by Simon & Garfunkel

from the album Bridge over Troubled Water
- Released: January 26, 1970
- Recorded: October 28, 1969
- Genre: Baroque pop; folk rock; soft rock; bossa nova
- Length: 3:41
- Label: Columbia
- Songwriter: Paul Simon
- Producers: Paul Simon; Art Garfunkel; Roy Halee

"So Long, Frank Lloyd Wright" is a song written by Paul Simon that was originally released on Simon & Garfunkel's 1970 album, Bridge over Troubled Water. It has since been released on several Simon & Garfunkel compilation albums. It has also been recorded by the London Pops Orchestra and Joe Chindamo trio. Art Garfunkel, who had studied architecture, requested that Simon write a song about the architect Frank Lloyd Wright. Simon knew little about Wright, so just used his name as a substitute and instead wrote a nostalgic song about Garfunkel. Garfunkel sings lead on the majority of the song while Simon sings on the bridge.

== Background ==
The lyrics of "So Long, Frank Lloyd Wright" reference the architect Frank Lloyd Wright, who died in 1959. Art Garfunkel had studied to become an architect. While Garfunkel sings the song's fadeout to the words "so long," producer and engineer Roy Halee is heard on the recording calling out "So long already Artie!" Other lines in the song refer to the songwriter having "barely learned the tune," and to the nights when an unspecified "we" would "harmonize 'til dawn." The author comments that "When I run dry, I'll stop awhile and think of you".

The accompaniment includes congas, strings, a flute uncredited on the liner notes, bass and a classical guitar part played in bossa nova style, primarily using seventh chords. The song has a stately melody and the tune incorporates varied rhythms and syncopations. The song's key modulates at the end of the first bridge from G-flat major to G major. Simon has recalled that he had been listening to Brazilian music, probably Antônio Carlos Jobim, when he wrote the tune for "So Long, Frank Lloyd Wright". Author Walter Everett suggests that the repeating note section of the bridge, about one minute into the song, effectively suggests the ordinariness of other architects, and also suggests some of Wright's architectural signatures.

Garfunkel did not realise that Simon had intended the song to refer to their partnership until many years after the album had been released. In an interview he remarked that Simon "never let me in on that" secret. He added, "I find that a secretive and unpleasant thing to have done to you." However, he has come to terms with the song, as he states in the liner notes to his 2012 compilation The Singer, in which "So Long, Frank Lloyd Wright" was included, further stating that he can ignore this subtext, since the song is "just so much fun to sing," and writes about Paul Simon, that "one loves the giver of a beautiful gift."

== See also ==
- Prairie House: Songs About Frank Lloyd Wright
