= The Boxer =

1969 song by Simon & Garfunkel

- Front cover of the US vinyl single displaying Art Garfunkel, while the back cover displays Paul Simon. The covers are reversed for some overseas releases.

Single by Simon & Garfunkel

from the album Bridge over Troubled Water
- B-side: "Baby Driver"
- Released: March 21, 1969
- Recorded: November 1968
- Genre: Folk rock
- Length: 5:10
- Label: Columbia
- Songwriter: Paul Simon
- Producers: Roy Halee; Paul Simon; Art Garfunkel

Simon & Garfunkel singles chronology
"Mrs. Robinson" (1968)	"The Boxer" (1969)	"Bridge over Troubled Water" (1970)

Audio
- "The Boxer" on YouTube

"The Boxer" is a song written by Paul Simon and recorded by the American music duo Simon & Garfunkel from their fifth and final studio album, Bridge over Troubled Water (1970). Produced by the duo and Roy Halee, it was released as a standalone single on March 21, 1969, but included on the album ten months later (at the time, songs that had been released this far ahead were rarely included on the next studio album). The song is a folk rock ballad that variously takes the form of a first-person lament as well as a third-person sketch of a boxer. The lyrics are largely autobiographical and partially inspired by the Bible and were written during a time when Simon felt he was being unfairly criticized. The song's lyrics discuss poverty and loneliness. It is particularly known for its plaintive refrain, in which they sing 'lie-la-lie', accompanied by a heavily reverbed snare drum.

"The Boxer" was the follow-up to one of the duo's most successful singles, "Mrs. Robinson". It peaked at number seven on the Billboard Hot 100. It performed well internationally, charting within the top 10 in nine countries, peaking highest in the Netherlands, Austria, South Africa, and Canada.

== Creation and recording ==
The original recording of the song is one of the duo's most highly produced and took over 100 hours to record. The recording was performed at multiple locations, including St. Paul's Chapel (Columbia University) in New York City and Columbia studios in Nashville and mixed on two eight-track recorders running in synchrony.

The version originally released by the duo features an instrumental melody played in unison on pedal steel guitar by Curly Chalker and piccolo trumpet. The song also features a bass harmonica, played by Charlie McCoy, heard during the second and final verses.

In a 2008 edition of Fretboard Journal, Fred Carter Jr. recounts to interviewer Rich Kienzle:

I had a baby Martin, which is a 000-18, and when we started the record in New York with Roy Halee, the engineer, and Paul [Simon] was playin' his Martin—I think it's a D-18 and he was tuned regular—he didn't have the song totally written lyrically, but he had most of the melody. And so all I was hearin' was bits and pieces while he was doin' his fingerpicking... I think he was fingerpicking in an open C. I tried two or three things and then picked up the baby Martin, which was about a third above his guitar, soundwise.

And I turned down the first string to a D, and tuned up the bass string to a G, which made it an open-G tuning, except for the fifth string, which was standard. Did some counter fingerpicking with him, just did a little backward roll, and lucked into a lick. And that turned into that little roll, and we cut it, just Paul and I, two guitars. Then we started to experiment with some other ideas and so forth. At the end of the day, we were still on the song. Garfunkel was amblin' around the studio, hummin’, and havin’ input at various times. They were real scientists. They’d get on a part, and it might be there [unfinished] six weeks later.

On my guitar, they had me miked with about seven mics. They had a near mic, a distant mic, a neck mic, a mic on the hole. They even miked my breathing. They miked the guitar in back. So Roy Halee was a genius at getting around. The first time we were listenin', they killed the breathing mic. And they had an ambient mic overhead, which picked up the two guitars together, I suppose. And so, I was breathin', I guess, pretty heavy in rhythm. And they wanted to take out that noise, and they took it out and said, 'Naw, we gotta leave that in.' That sounds almost like a rhythm on the record. So they left the breathin' mic on for the mix. I played Tele on it and a Twelve-string, three or four guitars on it. I was doing different guitar parts. One was a chord pattern and rhythm pattern. Did the Dobro lick on the regular six-string finger Dobro—not a slide Dobro.

I never heard the total record until I heard it on the air... I thought: That’s the greatest record I heard in my life, especially after the scrutiny and after all the time they spent on it and breakin’ it apart musically and soundwise and all of it. There was some magic in the studio that day, and Roy Halee captured it. Paul and I had a really nice groove.

The song has only one drumbeat, played during the 'lie-la-lie' refrain. The session drummer Hal Blaine created the heavily reverberated drum sound with the help of producer Roy Halee, who found a spot for the drums in front of an elevator in the Columbia offices. The recording of the drum was recorded as the song was being played live by the musicians. Blaine would pound the drums at the end of the "Lie la lie" vocals that were playing in his headphones, and at one point, an elderly security guard got a big surprise when he came out of the elevator and was startled by Blaine's thunderous drums.

Hal Blaine recounted the recording process: "There we were with all these mic[rophone] cables, my drums, and a set of headphones," says Blaine. "When the chorus came around—the 'lie-la-lie' bit—Roy had me come down on my snare drum as hard as I could. In that hallway, by the elevator shaft, it sounded like a cannon shot! Which was just the kind of sound we were after."

== Lyrics ==
The song's lyrics take the form of a first-person lament, as the singer describes his struggles to overcome loneliness and poverty in New York City. The final verse switches to a third-person sketch of a boxer: "In the clearing stands a boxer and a fighter by his trade, and he carries the reminders of every glove that laid him down or cut him till he cried out in his anger and his shame. I am leaving, I am leaving, but the fighter still remains."

The chorus consists of repetitions of the nonlexical vocable "lie-la-lie". Simon stated that this was originally intended only as a placeholder, but became part of the finished song.

I didn't have any words! Then people said it was 'lie' but I didn't really mean that. That it was a lie. But, it's not a failure of songwriting, because people like that and they put enough meaning into it, and the rest of the song has enough power and emotion, I guess, to make it go, so it's all right. But for me, every time I sing that part... [softly], I'm a little embarrassed.

The words are sometimes suggested to represent a "sustained attack on Bob Dylan". Under this interpretation, Dylan is identified by his experience as an amateur boxer, and the "lie-la-lie" chorus represents allegations of Dylan lying about his musical intentions. Biographer Marc Eliot wrote in Paul Simon: A Life, "In hindsight, this seems utterly nonsensical."

Bob Dylan, in turn, covered the song on his Self Portrait album, replacing the word "glove" with "blow". Paul Simon himself has suggested that the lyrics are largely autobiographical, written during a time when he felt he was being unfairly criticized:

I think I was reading the Bible around that time. That's where I think phrases such as "workman's wages" came from, and "seeking out the poorer quarters". That was biblical. I think the song was about me: everybody's beating me up, and I'm telling you now I'm going to go away if you don't stop.

During the recording of "The Boxer", Art Garfunkel met his future first wife, Linda Grossman. As he recalled:

I invited Linda to the studio that night… we were working on "The Boxer." She was reluctant, but she thought she'd try it. She came, sat over the engineering console, with her chin on her wrist, staring at me, Paul and Roy for four hours. She was going to know everything. I was impressed and flattered. I like people who third-degree me, who stare at me, I feel they're interested. And we went out afterwards, and I was very charmed and we dated a lot. It took us about three years though before I had the courage to ask her to marry me.

They divorced in 1975, with Garfunkel later claiming he never really loved her.

During a New York City concert in October 2010, Simon stopped singing midway through "The Boxer" to tell the story of a woman who stopped him on the street to tell him that she edits the song when singing it to her young child. Simon told the audience that she removed the words "the whores" and altered the song to say, "I get no offers, just a come-on from toy stores on Seventh Avenue." Simon laughingly commented that he felt that it was "a better line".

On June 3, 2016, at his concert in Berkeley, California, Simon again stopped singing partway through the song this time to announce, in one sentence, breaking news: "I’m sorry to tell you this in this way, but Muhammad Ali passed away." He then finished the song with the last verse: "In the clearing stands a boxer and a fighter by his trade…"

=== Additional verse ===
"The Boxer" was originally written with a verse that is not present in the Bridge over Troubled Water version:

Now the years are rolling by me—
They are rockin' evenly.
I am older than I once was,
And younger than I'll be.
That's not unusual;
No, it isn't strange:
After changes upon changes
We are more or less the same;
After changes we are more or less the same.

This verse was performed by Simon and Garfunkel on tour in November 1969 (this version of the song is included on the Live 1969 album), and sometimes by Simon in solo after the duo's breakup (on his Live Rhymin' album and on Late Night with David Letterman in 1987). The duo also added the verse on Saturday Night Live in 1975 and when they reunited for The Concert in Central Park in 1981. On March 30, 2020, Simon released a YouTube version dedicated to fellow New Yorkers during the COVID-19 pandemic including this verse.

== Reception ==
Upon the release of "The Boxer" as a single, Cash Box described it as a "spectacular side" and said, "First half of the ballad is in the haunting S&G folk style, but the production touches increase to build this track into a heavy fading 'Jude-ish' closer." Billboard said that Simon and Garfunkel have "a sure fire chart topper in this infectious rhythm ballad with a compelling lyric line."

Rolling Stone ranked the song number 106 on the 2010 edition of their list of the "500 Greatest Songs of All Time".

== Charts ==
=== Weekly charts ===
Chart (1969)	Peak position
Australia (ARIA)	8
Austria (Ö3 Austria Top 40)	9
Canada RPM Top Singles	3
Canada RPM Adult Contemporary	1
Finland (Suomen virallinen lista)	29
Ireland (IRMA)	7
Netherlands (Single Top 100)	2
New Zealand (Listener)	9
Norway (VG-lista)	9
Rhodesia (Lyons Maid)	13
Singapore (Radio Singapore)	1
Spain (Promusicae)	10
South Africa (Springbok Radio)	3
Sweden (Sverigetopplistan)	5
UK Singles (Official Charts)	6
US Billboard Hot 100	7
US Cash Box Top 100	4
West Germany (GfK)	19

=== Year-end charts ===
Chart (1969)	Rank
Canada	70
US (Joel Whitburn's Pop Annual)	79
US Adult Contemporary (Billboard)	42
US Cash Box	85

== Certifications ==
Region	Certification	Certified units/sales
New Zealand (RMNZ)	Platinum	30,000^{‡}
Spain (Promusicae)	Gold	30,000^{‡}
United Kingdom (BPI)	Platinum	600,000^{‡}
^{‡} Sales+streaming figures based on certification alone.

== Cover versions ==
Cover versions of the song have been recorded by numerous artists, including Me First and the Gimme Gimmes, Mumford and Sons, Bob Dylan, Neil Diamond, Emmylou Harris, The Samples, Leandro e Leonardo, Paula Fernandes, Tommy Fleming, The Celtic Tenors, Bruce Hornsby, Cake, Jonne Järvelä, Waylon Jennings, and Jess & Matt.

Joan Baez has also made the song a staple of her live concert performances, from the late 1970s to the present, including once in Italy with Italian songwriter Francesco De Gregori, who was also singing this song during his concerts; Baez performed the song with Paul Simon and Richard Thompson at her 75th Birthday Concert at New York's Beacon Theatre in January 2016.

Simon sang the song to open Saturday Night Live on September 29, 2001, the first live show following the September 11, 2001, attacks on New York City and Washington, DC.

In 2007, Simon was awarded the inaugural Gershwin Prize by the Library of Congress; Jerry Douglas, Shawn Colvin, and Alison Krauss performed "The Boxer" live. Also in 2007, country music artist Deana Carter released a cover of the song on her sixth studio album, The Chain, which was recorded as a duet with Harper Simon.

The Bluecoats Drum and Bugle Corps performed "The Boxer" as the ballad for their 2008 show The Knockout, and it has been a recurring encore tune for the corps ever since.

Jerry Douglas and Mumford and Sons collaborated with Paul Simon on a cover of the song in 2012. It was included on Douglas' album Traveler, and on the deluxe edition of Mumford and Sons' album Babel.
