= Daniel Alomía Robles =

Peruvian composer and ethnomusicologist

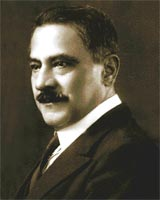
Alomía Robles c. 1936

Daniel Alomía Robles (3 January 1871 – 17 July 1942) was a Peruvian composer and ethnomusicologist. He is best known for composing the song "El Cóndor Pasa" in 1913 as part of a zarzuela — a musical play that alternates between spoken and sung parts — of the same name. This song was based on Andean folk songs and is possibly the best known Peruvian song, partly due to the worldwide success that the melody obtained when it was used by Simon & Garfunkel as their music for "El Cóndor Pasa (If I Could)", although that song has different lyrics.

== Early life ==
Daniel Alomía Robles was born in Huánuco, Peru, on January 3, 1871 to Micaela Robles and Marcial Alomía, a French immigrant.

Alomía Robles said in an interview in 1942 that his first exposure to music was when he was six years old when his mother took him to hear mass in Huánuco, and he began to sing along with the chorus. Alomía Robles said that he had a good ear and could reproduce any sound that he heard and that he took special pleasure as a child in singing the indigenous songs of Peru.

== Musical education ==
Alomía Robles attended primary school at La Mineria in Huánuco and moved with his family to Lima, Peru in 1882. It was while living with an uncle in Lima at the age of 12 that Alomía Robles first heard musical theatre.

Lima in the early 20th-century was filled with musical theatre, and many well known musicians made their home in Lima. Alomía Robles discovered that the theatre needed extras in the chorus line and offered himself so he could hear the music for free and learn the operettas of that period.

In Lima, Alomía Robles studied at the college Nuestra Señora de Guadalupe. Alomía Robles' early interest in music was encouraged there by his teachers Manuel De la Cruz Panizo and Claudio Rebagliatti. Alomía Robles says that Rebagliatti took him under his wing and offered to teach him music if Alomía Robles would help o Rebagliatti in his concerts.

In 1892, Alomía Robles decided to study medicine at University of San Marcos. In his third year he traveled with other students to the Amazon jungle regions where he met Catholic missionary Gabriel Sala, who came to influence Alomía Robles' life in music. Sala had created a city in the Amazon jungle region with 400 men and women who he taught to work in the fields and build their houses. Sala said to his people that it was not good to work without resting. So every Sunday at 2:00 PM he brought the people together to sing and dance.

Alomía Robles decided to leave the university in 1894 and dedicate his life to music. Alomía Robles' family, who had encouraged him to study medicine, were against this change of direction.

== Musical travels in South America ==
Alomía Robles traveled throughout Peru compiling the stories and myths of the folk music of the Amazon jungle regions and the mountains of the Andes. He continued his collections of versions of the songs from the most remote villages of Peru. Alomía Robles also traveled to Bolivia and Ecuador during this period.

It was during this period that Alomía Robles was appointed to the posts of Subperfecto and Justice of the Peace in Jauja and later mayor of Huacho.

In February 1897, Alomía Robles married Sebastiana Godoy Agostini, a Cuban pianist known as "Chana" whom he had met while he was living in Jauja. His wife supported him during his travels in South America. In an interview in 1942 with Esteban Pavletich Trujillo, Alomía Robles credited his wife as the impetus for creating his first musical works.

In 1910, Alomía Robles published his discovery that the musical structure of Andean music involved a Pentatonic scale. In 1911, Alomía Robles traveled to Argentina for the performance of his first opera Illa Cori that told the story of the Inca ruler Huayna Cápac and his conquest of Quito.

Marcela Robles, granddaughter of Alomía Robles, writes that in a time when the musical folklore of Peru was ignored or looked down on, Alomía Robles was a pioneer in collecting the music that otherwise would have disappeared.

== "El Cóndor Pasa" ==
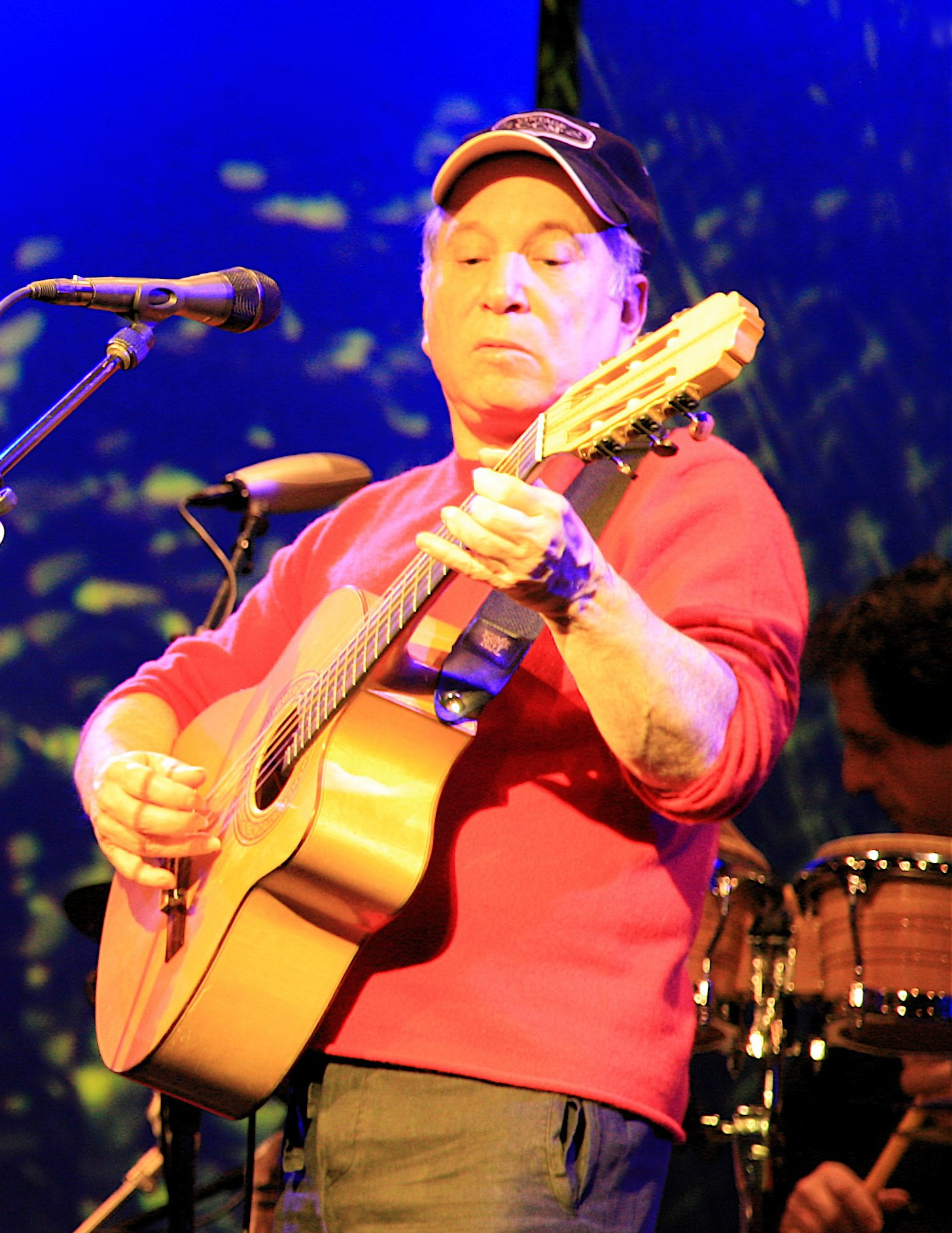
Simon & Garfunkel popularized "El Cóndor Pasa (If I Could)", with new English lyrics written by Paul Simon (above)

In 1913, Daniel Alomía Robles composed "El Cóndor Pasa", and the composition was first performed publicly at the Teatro Mazzi in Lima. The song was composed as part of a zarzuela (Spanish operetta) of strong social content about Peruvian miners in Cerro de Pasco and their relations with the foreign mining company. Marcela Robles writes that the zarzuela contained eight parts and was performed over 3,000 times in Lima at the Teatro Mazzi.

=== Covers and adaptations ===
In 1965, the American musician Paul Simon first heard the Los Incas version in a performance at the Théâtre de l'Est Parisien (Paris), in which both Paul Simon and the band, Los Incas participated. Simon requested use of the song for a future recording, to which Jorge Milchberg, a founding member of the band, wrongly informed him it was a traditional folk melody. Jorge Milchberg further informed Paul Simon that he is registered as the co-author and the arrangement on their version and added the well-known introduction which was not part of the original melody.

In 1970, the duo Simon & Garfunkel eventually covered the Los Incas version as "El Cóndor Pasa (If I Could)" for the album Bridge Over Troubled Water, with the added English lyrics by Paul Simon. The recording which attracted international acclaim and success. As Simon had believed the song to be a traditional Andean folk melody, only his name appeared as writer of the lyrics. Daniel Alomía Robles' son, Peruvian filmmaker Armando Robles Godoy, successfully sued for royalties and even later wrote new Spanish lyrics for the song himself, using Paul Simon's version as a reference. He bore no malice towards Simon for what he considered a misunderstanding and an honest mistake on the grounds that Simon had relied on misinformation.

In December 1996, the World Intellectual Property Organization (WIPO), enacted the Rights Of Performers (Moral Rights Of Performers); also known as "The Morality Treaty" into sanction. The parade and the cachua have been widely covered and spread, and in some cases, lyrics have been added (all of them should be considered apocryphal) and generally their rhythms and instrumentations have been changed.

== Life in the United States ==
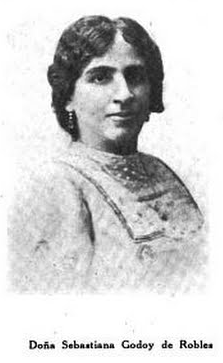
Sebastiana Godoy de Robles, from a 1920 publication.

In 1919, Alomía Robles traveled to the United States, living in New York City for 14 years until his return to Peru in 1933. He found life in the United States hard and a constant series of ups and downs even after he won third prize in a musical contest with 3,000 competitors. During his time in the United States, Alomía Robles performed in concerts, recorded music, and offered talks about Peruvian music.

Sebastiana Godoy Agostini traveled to New York with her husband, but died of cancer the year after her arrival. Her sister, Carmela Godoy Agostini, had accompanied the couple to New York to take care of Sebastiana during her illness. In 1922, two years after his wife's death, Alomía Robles married Carmela Godoy Agostini, and together they had two children, Armando and Mario. Marcela Robles writes that her grandmother Carmela Godoy Agostini supported the family during the Depression in New York City by selling paper flowers while Alomía Robles sat in front of his piano pursuing his music indifferent to his surroundings.

Alomía Robles' second youngest child, Armando Robles Godoy, who became a well known Peruvian film director, says that in his 14 years in New York City, his father never learned to speak English. He also said his father had a beautiful baritone voice and was obsessed with the number seven, only one of the mysteries that surrounded the magical world that his father lived in.

The New York Times reported on July 25, 1930, that the Goldman Band led by conductor Edwin Frank Goldman had played a program of Peruvian music composed by Alomía Robles on the campus of New York University. At the conclusion of the first half of the program Alomía Robles presented a bust of Mr. Goldman to the conductor. Alomía Robles pointed out in a brief address that Mr. Goldman was the only American conductor who had made extensive use of Peruvian music. The program included five compositions by Alomía Robles, "March Peru", "En Los Andes", "Hymn To The Sun", "Cashua" and "Fondero".

According to The New York Times, "several of his compositions were based on ancient Inca melodies, furthermore the music from which "Hymn To The Sun" was arranged is estimated to be about 3,000 years old."

Alomía Robles returned to Peru in 1933 after 14 years in the United States and took up the post of the head of the Section of Fine Arts at the Ministry of Education in Lima, Peru. His son Sebastian Tomas Robles remained in the United States and in 1933 became a staff cartoonist for the Editors Press Service in New York City and was selected by The Washington Post to sketch government personalities for the National Gallery.

== Musical legacy ==
Alomía Robles compiled over 700 compositions of popular music of Peru and according to the catalog compiled by Rodolfo Holzmann in 1943, Alomía Robles composed more than 238 songs including "El Indio", "Resurgimiento De Los Andes", "Amanecer Andino", "Danza Huanca" and "Alcedo Y Su Ballet". In 1990, Armando Robles Godoy published a folio of his father's compositions, Himno Al Sol: La Obra Folclórica Y Musical De Daniel Alomía Robles. Armando Robles Godoy said this was a labor of love. The research alone took him two years to collect the pieces with the help of Enrique Pinilla y Édgar Valcárcel. In a 1940 article on the state of music in Peru, The New York Times praised Alomía Robles as having "a considerable natural talent" and for "bettering the knowledge of the folklore of his country."

== Personal life ==
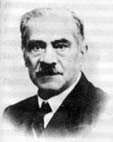
Daniel Alomía Robles, Legacy

Daniel Alomía Robles was married to Sebastiana Godoy Agostini with whom he had ten children including four sons: Jack, Felix, Ernest, and Carlos. After Sebastiana's death from cancer, he married her sister, Carmela Godoy Agostini, with whom he had two more children: Mario and Armando.

Robles died of sepsis on June 18, 1942, at Chosica, about 30 miles from Lima.

On August 14, 1996, his remains were returned to his hometown of Huánuco where they were received by thousands of people.

On December 1, 2006, the family of Alomía Robles, represented by his son Armando Robles Godoy, donated the original manuscripts of all Daniel Alomía Robles' compositions to the Catholic University Of Peru. The manuscripts included the originals of “El Cóndor Pasa” and “Himno Al Sol”, and all of the “Colección Folklórica”.
