= El Cóndor Pasa (song) =

Instrumental song composed by Daniel Alomía Robles

Song
- Published: 1913
- Composer: Daniel Alomía Robles

Cultural Heritage of Peru
- Official name: El Cóndor Pasa
- Type: Intangible
- Criteria: Work of a great master
- Designated: 16 March 2004; 22 years ago
- Legal basis: RDN 219/INC-2004

"El Cóndor Pasa" (pronounced [el ˈkondoɾ pasa], Spanish for "The Condor Passes") is an orchestral musical piece from the zarzuela El Cóndor Pasa by the Peruvian composer Daniel Alomía Robles, written in 1913 and based on traditional Andean music, specifically folk music from Peru.

Since then, it has been estimated that, around the world, more than 4,000 versions of the melody have been produced, along with 300 sets of lyrics. In 2004, Peru declared this song to be a part of its national cultural heritage. This song is now considered the second national anthem of Peru.

The song was further popularised by a 1970 cover by Simon & Garfunkel, with English lyrics by Paul Simon, on their Bridge over Troubled Water album. Their version is called "El Cóndor Pasa (If I Could)".

== Original zarzuela version ==
In 1913, Peruvian songwriter Daniel Alomía Robles composed "El Cóndor Pasa", and the song was first performed publicly at the Teatro Mazzi in Lima. The song was originally a musical piece in the Peruvian zarzuela (musical play), El cóndor pasa. The zarzuela is written in prose and consists of one musical play and two acts.

Its music was composed by Daniel Alomía Robles in 1913 and its script was written by Julio de La Paz (pseudonym of the Limenian dramatist Julio Baudouin). The piano arrangement of this play's most famous melody was legally registered on May 3, 1933, by The Edward B. Marks Music Corp. in the Library of Congress, under the number 9643.

As Alomía Robles died in 1942, the original version of the song has been in the public domain since 1 January 2013.

== Simon & Garfunkel version ==
"El Cóndor Pasa (If I Could)"

Single by Simon & Garfunkel featuring Los Incas

from the album Bridge over Troubled Water
- B-side: "Why Don't You Write Me"
- Released: September 1970
- Genre: Folk rock; Andean music
- Length: 3:06
- Label: Columbia
- Songwriters: Daniel Alomía Robles (music); Paul Simon (English lyrics); Jorge Milchberg (arrangement)
- Producers: Paul Simon; Art Garfunkel; Roy Halee

Simon & Garfunkel singles chronology
"Cecilia" (1970)	"El Cóndor Pasa (If I Could)" (1970)	"The 59th Street Bridge Song (Feelin' Groovy)" (1971)

Audio
- "El Cóndor Pasa (If I Could)" on YouTube

In 1965, the American pop musician Paul Simon heard for the first time a version of the melody by the band Los Incas in a performance at the Théâtre de l'Est parisien in Paris in which both were participating. Simon became friendly with the band, later even touring with them and producing their first American album. He asked the band for permission to use the piece in his production. The band's director and founding member Jorge Milchberg, who was collecting royalties for the piece as co-author and arranger, responded erroneously that it was a traditional Peruvian composition. Milchberg told Simon he was registered as the arrangement's co-author and collected royalties.

Simon & Garfunkel recorded the song under the title "El Cóndor Pasa (If I Could)", featuring English lyrics credited to Simon. The instrumental version by Los Incas was used as the base track. The duo included the song on their 1970 album, Bridge over Troubled Water, and released it as a single in the US, where it reached number 18 on the Billboard Pop Singles chart and number 6 on the Easy Listening chart, in fall 1970, and peaked at number 11 on the Cash Box Top 100.

Cash Box said that "Paul Simon's arrangement and lyrics turn a marvelous South American folk melody into a stunning commentary." Billboard called it a "sensitive and moving ballad".

Later that year, Perry Como released a recording of Simon's version on his album It's Impossible, while Julie Felix had a UK Top 20 hit with it, taking advantage of Simon & Garfunkel's decision not to release their version as a UK single.

=== Copyright lawsuit ===
In late 1970, Daniel Alomía Robles' son Armando Robles Godoy, a Peruvian filmmaker, filed a successful copyright lawsuit against Simon. The grounds for the lawsuit extended that the song had been composed by his father, who had copyrighted the song in the United States in 1933. Godoy said that he held no ill will towards Simon for what he considered a "misunderstanding" and an "honest mistake".

"It was an almost friendly court case because Paul Simon was very respectful of other cultures. It was not carelessness on his part", said Godoy. "He happened to hear the song in Paris from a vernacular group Los Incas. He liked it, he went to ask the band for permission and they gave him the wrong information. Jorge Milchberg told him it was a traditional folk song from the 18th century and not my father's composition. It was a court case without further complications."

Godoy subsequently wrote new Spanish lyrics for the song, taking Simon's version as a reference.

=== Charts ===
Chart (1970)	Peak position
Australian (Kent Music Report)	1
Austrian Singles Chart	1
Canada (RPM)	4
Danish Singles Chart (IFPI Denmark)	3
Dutch Singles Chart	1
Finland (Suomen virallinen lista)	10
Indonesia (Aktuil)	2
Italy (Musica e dischi)	11
Japan (Oricon International Chart)	1
New Zealand (RIANZ)	14
Spanish Singles Chart	1
Switzerland Singles Chart	1
US Singles Chart (Billboard Hot 100)	18
West German Singles Chart	1

=== Certifications and sales ===
Region	Certification	Certified units/sales
Austria	—	60,000
France	—	250,000
Germany	—	1,000,000
United Kingdom (BPI)	Silver	200,000^{‡}
^{‡} Sales+streaming figures based on certification alone.

== Other versions ==
Argentine guitarist and composer Eduardo Falú also adapted the song for solo guitar. Many other covers belong to Peruvian guitar players including: Raúl García Zárate, Manuelcha Prado, and Mario Orozco Cáceres. There are covers by Peruvian singers including: Yma Súmac, Roxsana, and Kesia Rivera with different lyrics. Other singers including Plácido Domingo, Celia Cruz, Marc Anthony, José Feliciano, and Esther Ofarim have their own covers of the song.

In Canada, a version by the James Last Orchestra reached No. 46 on October 31, 1970, a week after the Simon and Garfunkel version hit its peak.

In 2012, Ecuadorian musician Leo Rojas released his debut album Spirit of the Hawk, which included a flute and pan flute version of the song.

== Sources ==
- Colectivo Cultural Centenario El Cóndor Pasa, ed. (2013). El cóndor pasa…Cien años después. Lima. ISBN 9786124647208. Registered in the National Library of Peru.
- Salazar Mejía, Luis (2013). El misterio del cóndor: Memoria e historia de "El cóndor pasa…". Lima: Taky Onqoy Ediciones. ISBN 9786124660504. Registered in the National Library of Peru.
- Cerrón Fetta, Mario (2014). Cuadernos de Música Peruana Nº 12. Lima.Editorial/ Cuadernos de Música. Register: Legal deposit Nº2008-06894. Registered in the National Library of Peru.
