= Roy Halee =

American record producer and engineer (born 1934)

- Born: Roy Decker Halee; 1934 (age 91–92); Long Island, New York, US
- Occupations: Record producer, audio engineer

Roy Decker Halee (born 1934) is an American record producer and engineer, best known for working with Simon & Garfunkel, both as a group and for their solo projects.

== Early life ==
Halee grew up on Long Island, New York. His father, also named Roy Halee, provided the singing voice for Mighty Mouse in the late 1940s Terrytoons cartoons, as well as the voices of Heckle and Jeckle from 1951 through 1961. His mother, Rebekah Cauble, was a former stage actress with several Broadway credits.

== Career ==
Halee, who had been studying to be a classical trumpet player, began working as a cameraman for CBS Television in the late 1950s, eventually becoming an audio engineer for Goodson-Todman game shows and the top-rated The $64,000 Question.

As television shows moved to the West Coast, he lost his job in a union dispute and layoff at CBS Television. He went to work at Columbia Records Studio A, first as an editor then later a studio engineer, where his first recording session was for Bob Dylan's 1965 album Highway 61 Revisited, including the first long-format radio single, "Like a Rolling Stone".

In 1964, he first encountered Simon & Garfunkel during their Columbia audition, and he is mentioned in the song "A Simple Desultory Philippic (or How I Was Robert McNamara'd into Submission)" by Paul Simon. In 1965, Halee collaborated with Columbia staff producer Tom Wilson to overdub electric instruments and drums onto the originally-released acoustic version of "The Sound of Silence" without the duo's knowledge, with the remixed version reaching number one on the Billboard singles chart.

Halee's role with Simon and Garfunkel expanded to producer-engineer, with Halee producing several albums with the duo. Halee discovered that the uniqueness of Simon & Garfunkel's vocal harmonies could only be achieved by recording both voices on the same microphone at the same time. The song "Mrs. Robinson", from the 1968 album The Graduate, won him a Grammy Award. Three more Grammy Awards followed for his work on the album Bookends, and the song "Bridge Over Troubled Water" in 1970. After Simon & Garfunkel split up, Halee co-produced Simon's first solo album and its follow-up, There Goes Rhymin' Simon.

Halee also worked with the Lovin' Spoonful, the Dave Clark Five and the Yardbirds, as well as Barbra Streisand, the Byrds, Journey (on their first album Journey), Willie Nile, Laura Nyro, Blood, Sweat & Tears, Mark-Almond Band, Rufus and Blue Angel. After working at Columbia studios in New York and Los Angeles, Halee established Columbia's San Francisco recording studio. In 1975 he left those studios for ABC Recording Studios, where he worked with new acts and established ABC artists as producer, engineer or both. His first project was the Mark-Almond Band.

In 1985, Halee went with Paul Simon to South Africa to record something new that, he said, "wasn't written yet, we were going with nothing, so it was a gamble. A lot of people thought we were nuts." It led to the Grammy Award-winning album Graceland. "I was having a ball recording these guys. For a guy from my background, everything was so organised generally. Here in the rawness of this, the earthiness, I was in seventh heaven." After Graceland, Roy Halee continued travelling with Simon as an engineer, to Brazil and West Africa, for the album The Rhythm of the Saints, with "all congas, bass drums, bata...everything imaginable." He has continued working with Simon.

In 2001, Halee was named to the TEC Awards Hall of Fame.

== Personal life ==
Halee married his wife Katherine in 1970 and together they have three children.
