= List of songs written by Paul Simon =

This is an alphabetical list of songs written or co-written by the American singer-songwriter Paul Simon, with dates of their composition (as close an approximation as possible).

== # ==
- "7 O'Clock News/Silent Night" (1966)
- "50 Ways To Leave Your Lover" (1975)
- "The 59th Street Bridge Song (Feelin' Groovy)" (1966)

== A ==
- "Ace In The Hole" (1979)
- "Adios Hermanos" (1995)
- "All Around The World Or The Myth Of Fingerprints" (1986)
- "Allergies" (1981)
- "America" (1968)
- "American Tune" (1973)
- "Anna Belle" (as Jerry Landis, 1959)
- "Another Galaxy" (2005)
- "April Come She Will" (1965)
- "Armistice Day" (1972)
- "At The Zoo" (1966)

== B ==
- "Baby Driver" (1968)
- "Beautiful" (2006)
- "Bernadette" (1996)
- "The Big Bright Green Pleasure Machine" (1966)
- "Bleecker Street" (1963)
- "Blessed" (1965)
- "Bookends Theme" (Two versions, one instrumental, one with vocals, 1968)
- "Born At The Right Time" (1990)
- "Born In Puerto Rico" (1996)
- "The Boxer" (1968)
- "The Boy In The Bubble" (1986)
- "Bridge Over Troubled Water" (1969)

== C ==
- "Can I Forgive Him" (1996)
- "Carlos Dominguez" (as Paul Kane, 1963)
- "Cards Of Love" (as Jerry Landis, 1962; the CD "Tom & Jerry Meets Tico & the Triumphs" credits Burak Brennan)
- "Cars Are Cars" (1983)
- "Cecilia" (1969)
- "A Church Is Burning" (1965)
- "Citizen Of The Planet" (1983)
- "Cloudy" (with Bruce Woodley, 1965)
- "The Clock" (2016)
- "Congratulations" (1971)
- "The Coast" (1990)
- "Cool Papa Bell" (2016)
- "Crazy Love, Vol. II" (1986)
- "Cry, Little Boy, Cry" (as Jerry Landis, 1962)
- "Cuba Si, Nixon No" (1969)

== D ==
- "Dancin' Wild" (as Jerry Landis, and with Art Garfunkel as Tom Graph, 1957)
- "The Dangling Conversation" (1966)
- "Darling Lorraine" (2000)
- "Diamonds On The Soles Of Her Shoes" (1986)
- "Dori Anne" (as Jerry Landis, with David Winters and J. Kay, 1963)
- "Duncan" (1972)

== E ==
- "El Condor Pasa (If I Could)" (English lyric only, 1969)
- "Everything About It Is A Love Song" (2004)
- "Everything Put Together Falls Apart" (1972)
- "Express Train" (as Jerry Landis, 1962)

== F ==
- "Fakin' It" (1967)
- "Father And Daughter" (2002)
- "Flowers Never Bend With The Rainfall" (1965)
- "For Emily, Whenever I May Find Her" (1966)
- "Forever and After" (1962, Recorded under Jerry Landis)
- "Further to Fly" (1990)

== G ==
- "Get Up And Do The Wobble" (as Jerry Landis, 1962)
- "Getting Ready For Christmas Day" (2010)
- "The Girl For Me" (with Art Garfunkel, 1955)
- "God Bless The Absentee" (1980)
- "Gone At Last" (1975)
- "Graceland" (1986)
- "Gumboots" (1986)

== H ==
- "A Hazy Shade Of Winter" (1966)
- "He Was My Brother" (as Paul Kane, 1963)
- "Hearts And Bones" (1983)
- "Hey, Schoolgirl" (as Jerry Landis, and with Art Garfunkel as Tom Graph, 1957)
- "Homeless" (1986)
- "Homeward Bound" (1965)
- "How Can You Live In The Northeast?" (2005)
- "How The Heart Approaches What It Yearns" (1980)
- "Hurricane Eye" (1999)

== I ==
- "I Am A Rock" (1965)
- "I Do It For Your Love" (1975)
- "I Don't Believe" (2005)
- "I Don't Believe Them" (as Jerry Landis, 1961)
- "I Know What I Know" (1986)
- "I Wish I Weren't In Love" (as Jerry Landis, 1962)
- "I Wish You Could Be Here" (with Bruce Woodley, 1965)
- "In A Parade" (2016)
- "In The Garden Of Edie" (2016)
- "Insomniac's Lullaby" (2016)

== J ==
- "Jonah" (1980)
- "Just A Boy" (as Jerry Landis, 1960)

== K ==
- "Kathy's Song" (1965)
- "Keep The Customer Satisfied" (1970)
- "Kodachrome" (1973)

== L ==
- "The Late, Great, Johnny Ace" (1981)
- "Late In The Evening" (1980)
- "Learn How To Fall" (1972)
- "Leaves That Are Green" (1965)
- "Lisa" (as Jerry Landis, 1962)
- "The Lone Teen Ranger" (as Jerry Landis, 1962)
- "Loneliness" (as Jerry Landis, 1959)
- "Long, Long Day" (1980)
- "Love" (2000)
- "Love And Hard Times" (2008)
- "Loves Me Like A Rock" (1973)

== M ==
- "Me And Julio Down By The Schoolyard" (1971)
- "A Most Peculiar Man" (1965)
- "Mother And Child Reunion" (1972)
- "Motorcycle" (as Jerry Landis, with Tico and the Triumphs, 1961)
- "Mrs. Robinson" (1967)
- "My Little Town" (1975)

== N ==
- "Night Game" (1975)
- "Nobody" (1980)
- "Noise" (as Jerry Landis, 1962)
- "The Northern Line" (1965, from Concert in the Barn private recording)

== O ==
- "The Obvious Child" (1990)
- "Oh, Marion" (1980)
- "Old" (2000)
- "Old Friends" (1968)
- "Once Upon A Time There Was An Ocean" (2005)
- "One Man's Ceiling Is Another Man's Floor" (1973)
- "One-Trick Pony" (1979)
- "The Only Living Boy In New York" (1969)
- "Our Song" (as Jerry Landis, and with Art Garfunkel as Tom Graph, 1958)
- "Outrageous" (2003)
- "Overs" (1967)

== P ==
- "Papa Hobo" (1972)
- "Paranoia Blues" (1972)
- "Patterns" (1965)
- "Peace Like A River" (1972)
- "Pigs, Sheep And Wolves" (2000)
- "Play Me A Sad Song" (1961)
- "A Poem On The Underground Wall" (1966)
- "(Pretty Baby) Don't Say Goodbye" (as Jerry Landis, and with Art Garfunkel as Tom Graph, 1958)
- "Proof Of Love" (1990)
- "Punky's Dilemma" (1967)

== Q ==
- "Quality" (1996)
- "Questions For The Angels" (2011)
- "Quiet" (2000)

== R ==
- "Red Rubber Ball" (with Bruce Woodley, 1965)
- "Rene and Georgette Magritte with Their Dog after the War" (1983)
- "Richard Cory" (1965)
- "The Riverbank" (2016)
- "Run That Body Down" (1972)

== S ==
- "Save the Life of My Child" (1967)
- "Shopliftin' Clothes" (1996)
- "Shy" (as Jerry Landis, 1960)
- "The Side Of A Hill" (as Paul Kane, 1963)
- "Silent Eyes" (1975)
- "A Simple Desultory Philippic" (various subtitles, 1965 and 1966)
- "Slip Slidin' Away" (1977)
- "So Long, Frank Lloyd Wright" (1970)
- "Soft Parachutes" (1981)
- "Someday One Day" (recorded by The Seekers) (1965)
- "Something So Right" (1973)
- "Somewhere They Can't Find Me" (1965)
- "Song About The Moon" (1982)
- "Song For The Asking" (1969)
- "The Sound Of Silence" (February 19, 1964)
- "Sparrow" (1964)
- "Spirit Voices" (1990)
- "St. Judy's Comet" (1973)
- "Still Crazy After All These Years" (1975)
- "Stranded In A Limousine" (1977)
- "Stranger To Stranger" (2016)
- "Street Angel" (2016)
- "Sure Don't Feel Like Love" (2004)

== T ==
- "Take Me To The Mardi Gras" (1972)
- "The Teacher" (2000)
- "Teenage Fool" (1958)
- "Tenderness" (1973)
- "Ten Years" (1997)
- "That's Me" (2005)
- "That's My Story" (as Jerry Landis, and with Art Garfunkel as Tom Graph, 1958)
- "That's Where I Belong" (2000)
- "That's Why God Made The Movies" (1980)
- "That Was Your Mother" (1986)
- "Think Too Much (A)" (1983)
- "Think Too Much (B)" (1983)
- "Train In The Distance" (1983)

== V ==
- "The Vampires" (1995)
- "Virgil" (1996)

== W ==
- "Wartime Prayers" (2004)
- "Was A Sunny Day" (1973)
- "Wednesday Morning, 3 A.M." (1964)
- "We've Got A Groovy Thing Goin'" (1965)
- "The Werewolf" (2016)
- "When Numbers Get Serious" (1982)
- "Why Don't You Write Me" (1969)
- "Wild Flower" (as Jerry Landis, 1962)
- "Wristband" (2016)

== Y ==
- "You Can Call Me Al" (1986)
- "You Don't Know Where Your Interest Lies" (1966)
- "You're The One" (2000)
