= List of songs recorded by Paul Simon =

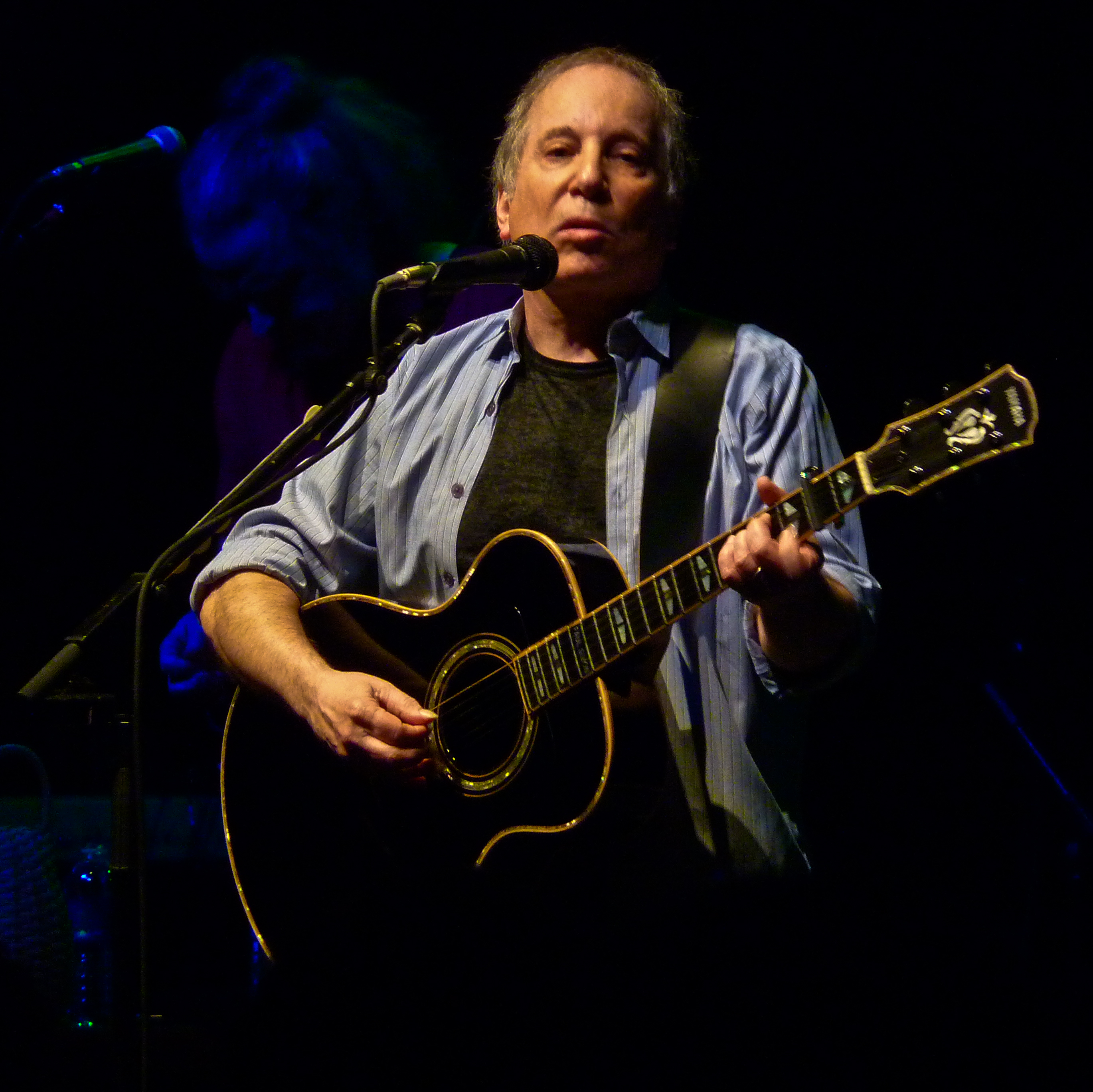
Paul Simon playing at the 9:30 Club in Washington, D.C.

Paul Simon is an American singer-songwriter who has released twelve solo studio albums, one soundtrack, three live albums, and numerous compilations and box sets. Simon began his career with the single "Hey, Schoolgirl" alongside Art Garfunkel in 1957; they subsequently regrouped in 1964 to form Simon & Garfunkel. Simon & Garfunkel recorded five albums together,

This list comprises both his solo work, songs he has been featured on, songs recorded with Art Garfunkel, and songs released in the 1950s–60s under pseudonyms. It contains his available recorded material, including alternate versions of songs, which are listed separately, and well-known unreleased material.

== Songs ==
Key
†	Indicates single release
#	Indicates single release with Art Garfunkel

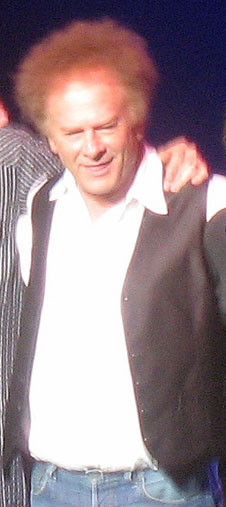
Much of Simon's 1960s output was recorded alongside Art Garfunkel.

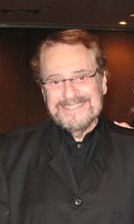
Producer Phil Ramone worked on five of Simon's albums from 1973 to 2011.

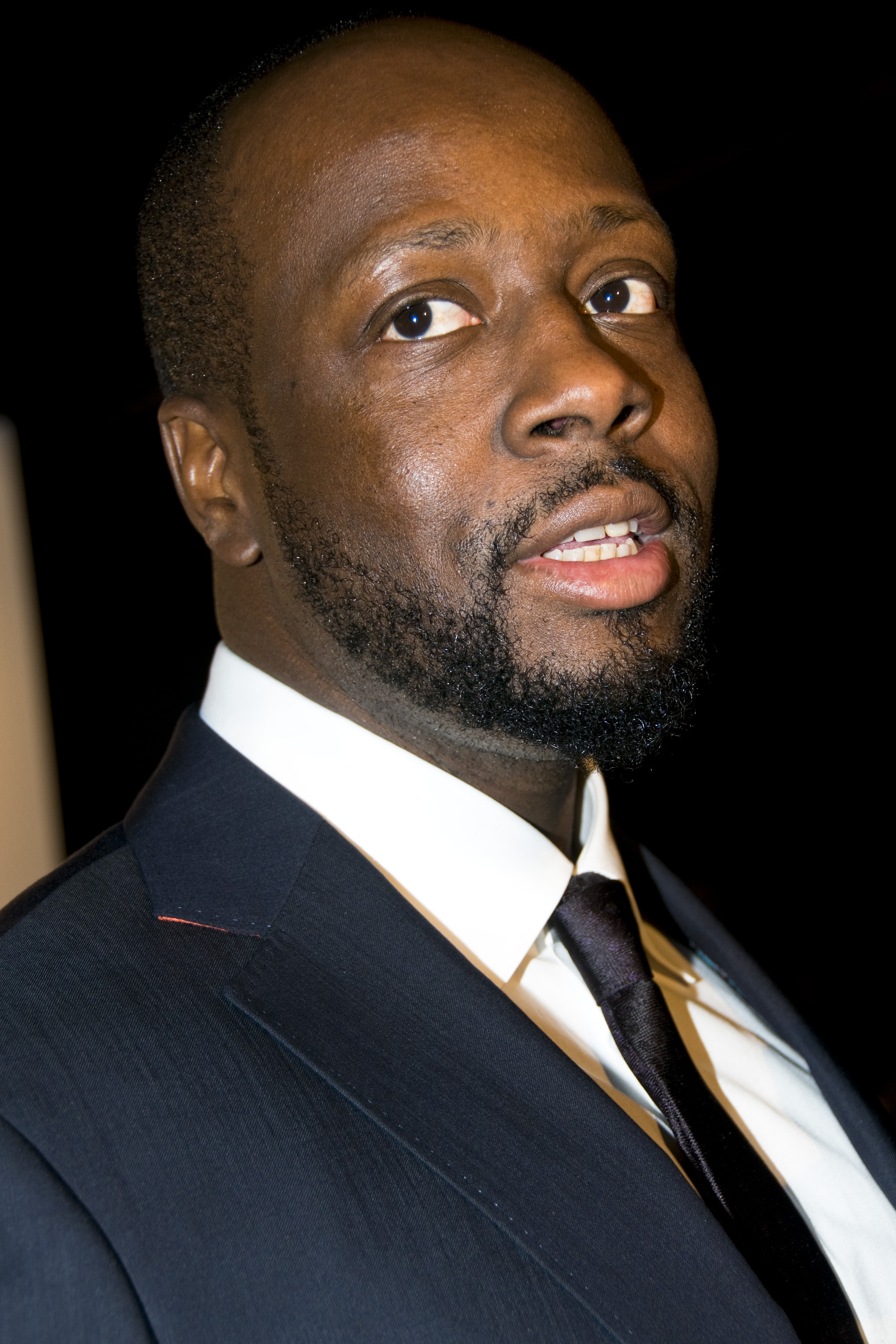
Simon collaborated with rapper Wyclef Jean on his 2007 album Carnival Vol. II: Memoirs of an Immigrant.

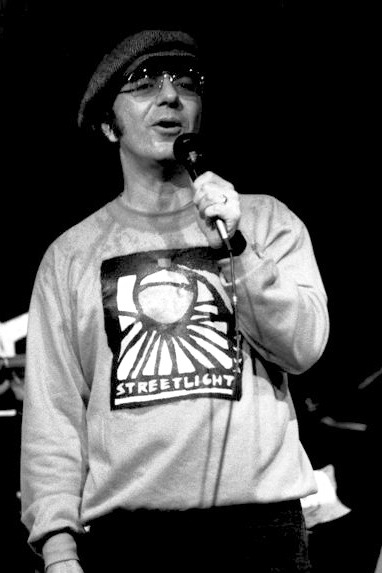
Simon collaborated with Dion on "New York Is My Home" in 2016.

Name of song, originating album, and year released.
Song	Album	Year	Ref.
"50 Ways to Leave Your Lover" †	Still Crazy After All These Years	1975	
"The 59th Street Bridge Song (Feelin' Groovy)" (with Art Garfunkel)	Parsley, Sage, Rosemary and Thyme	1966	
"7 O'Clock News/Silent Night" (with Art Garfunkel)	Parsley, Sage, Rosemary and Thyme	1966	
"Ace in the Hole"	One-Trick Pony	1980	
"A Church Is Burning"	The Paul Simon Songbook	1965	
"Adios Hermanos"	Songs from The Capeman	1997	
"The Afterlife" †	So Beautiful or So What	2011	
"A Hazy Shade of Winter" (with Art Garfunkel) #	Bookends	1968	
"All Around the World or the Myth of Fingerprints"	Graceland	1986	
"All Because of You"	One-Trick Pony (Reissue)	2004	
"Allergies" †	Hearts and Bones	1983	
"All Through the Night" (as a member of the Mystics)	None	1960	
"America" (with Art Garfunkel) #	Bookends	1968	
"American Tune" †	There Goes Rhymin' Simon	1973	
"A Mile Out of Memphis" (with Carl Perkins)	Go Cat Go	1996	
"A Most Peculiar Man" (Note: "A Most Peculiar Man" was later re-recorded for its appearance on Simon & Garfunkel's Sounds of Silence (1966).)	The Paul Simon Songbook	1965	
"Amulet"	So Beautiful or So What	2011	
"Anna Belle" (as Jerry Landis)	None	1958	
"Anji" (with Art Garfunkel)	Sounds of Silence	1966	
"Another Galaxy"	Surprise	2006	
"A Poem on the Underground Wall" (with Art Garfunkel)	Parsley, Sage, Rosemary and Thyme	1966	
"April Come She Will" (Note: "April Come She Will" was later re-recorded for its appearance on Simon & Garfunkel's Sounds of Silence (1966).)	The Paul Simon Songbook	1965	
"A Simple Desultory Philippic (or How I Was Robert McNamara'd into Submission)" (Note: "A Simple Desultory Philippic (or How I Was Robert McNamara'd into Submission)" was later re-recorded for its appearance on Simon & Garfunkel's Parsley, Sage, Rosemary and Thyme (1966).)	The Paul Simon Songbook	1965	
"At the Zoo" (with Art Garfunkel) #	Bookends	1968	
"Armistice Day"	Paul Simon	1972	
"Baby Driver" (with Art Garfunkel)	Bridge over Troubled Water	1970	
"Bad Dream" (with Edie Brickell)	None	2024	
"Barbriallen" (with Art Garfunkel)	Sounds of Silence (Reissue)	2001	
"Beautiful"	Surprise	2006	
"Benedictus" (with Art Garfunkel)	Wednesday Morning, 3 A.M.	1964	
"Bernadette"	Songs from The Capeman	1997	
"The Big Bright Green Pleasure Machine" (with Art Garfunkel)	Parsley, Sage, Rosemary and Thyme	1966	
"Black Slacks" (Note: "Black Slacks" is connected with "Hey, Schoolgirl" on Old Friends (1997) but is presented separately here.) (with Art Garfunkel)	Old Friends	1997	
"Born at the Right Time" †	The Rhythm of the Saints	1990	
"Born in Puerto Rico"	Songs from The Capeman	1997	
"The Boxer" (with Art Garfunkel) #	Bridge over Troubled Water	1970	
"The Boy in the Bubble" †	Graceland	1986	
"Bleecker Street" (with Art Garfunkel)	Wednesday Morning, 3 A.M.	1964	
"Blessed" (with Art Garfunkel)	Sounds of Silence	1966	
"The Blues" (with Randy Newman) †	Trouble in Paradise	1983	
"Blues Run the Game" (with Art Garfunkel)	Sounds of Silence (Reissue)	2001	
"BookendsBookends" (Note: "Bookends" is also known as "Bookends Theme".) (with Art Garfunkel)	Bookends	1968	
"Bridge over Troubled Water" (with Art Garfunkel) #	Bridge over Troubled Water	1970	
"Bye Bye Love" (with Art Garfunkel) (The Everly Brothers cover)	Bridge over Troubled Water	1970	
"Can I Forgive Him"	Songs from The Capeman	1997	
"Can't Run But"	The Rhythm of the Saints	1990	
"Cards of Love" (as a member of Tico & the Triumphs)	None	1962	
"Cars Are Cars"	Hearts and Bones	1983	
"Cecilia" (with Art Garfunkel) #	Bridge over Troubled Water	1970	
"Citizen of the Planet" (with Art Garfunkel)	Old Friends: Live on Stage	2004	
"The Clock"	Stranger to Stranger	2016	
"Cloudy" (with Art Garfunkel)	Parsley, Sage, Rosemary and Thyme	1966	
"The Coast"	The Rhythm of the Saints	1990	
"Comfort and Joy" (with Art Garfunkel)	Old Friends	1997	
"Congratulations"	Paul Simon	1972	
"The Cool, Cool River"	The Rhythm of the Saints	1990	
"Cool Papa Bell"	Stranger to Stranger	2016	
"Crazy Love, Vol. II"	Graceland	1986	
"Cry, Little Boy, Cry" (as a member of Tico & the Triumphs)	None	1962	
"Cuba Si, Nixon No" (with Art Garfunkel)	None (Note: "Cuba Si, Nixon No" was recorded for Bridge over Troubled Water but left unreleased due to disagreements between Simon and Garfunkel. It has still yet to see release.)	1970	
"Dancin' Wild" (with Art Garfunkel)	None	1957	
"The Dangling Conversation" (with Art Garfunkel) #	Parsley, Sage, Rosemary and Thyme	1966	
"Darling Lorraine"	You're the One	2000	
"Dazzling Blue"	So Beautiful or So What	2011	
"Diamonds on the Soles of Her Shoes" †	Graceland	1986	
"Don't Take the Stars" (as a member of the Mystics)	None	1958	
"Duncan" †	Paul Simon	1972	
"El Condor Pasa (If I Could)" (with Art Garfunkel) #	Bridge over Troubled Water	1970	
"Everything Put Together Falls Apart"	Paul Simon	1972	
"Everything About It Is a Love Song"	Surprise	2006	
"Express Train" (as a member of Tico & the Triumphs)	None	1962	
"Fakin' It" (with Art Garfunkel) #	Bookends	1968	
"Fast Car" (Wyclef Jean featuring Paul Simon)	Carnival Vol. II: Memoirs of an Immigrant	2007	
"Father and Daughter" †	The Wild Thornberrys Movie (Music from the Motion Picture)	2003	
"Feuilles-O" (with Art Garfunkel)	Old Friends	1997	
"Fightin' Mad"	None	1959	
"Flowers Never Bend with the Rainfall" (Note: "Flowers Never Bend with the Rainfall" was later re-recorded for its appearance on Simon & Garfunkel's Parsley, Sage, Rosemary and Thyme (1966).)	The Paul Simon Songbook	1965	
"For Emily, Whenever I May Find Her" (with Art Garfunkel) #	Parsley, Sage, Rosemary and Thyme	1966	
"Further to Fly"	The Rhythm of the Saints	1990	
"Getting Ready for Christmas Day" †	So Beautiful or So What	2011	
"Get Up and Do the Wobble" (as a member of Tico & the Triumphs)	None	1962	
"God Bless the Absentee"	One-Trick Pony	1980	
"Gone at Last" (with Phoebe Snow and the Jessy Dixon Singers) †	Still Crazy After All These Years	1975	
"Go Tell It on the Mountain" (with Art Garfunkel)	Wednesday Morning, 3 A.M.	1964	
"Graceland" †	Graceland	1986	
"Groundhog" (with Art Garfunkel)	None (Note: "Groundhog" was recorded in the Bookends sessions but has never seen official release.)	1967	
"Guitar Piece 3"	Stranger to Stranger (Deluxe Edition)	2016	
"Gumboots"	Graceland	1986	
"Have a Good Time" †	Still Crazy After All These Years	1975	
"A Heart in New York"	The Concert in Central Park	1982	
"Hearts and Bones"	Hearts and Bones	1983	
"Here Comes the Sun" (with David Crosby and Graham Nash)	The 25th Anniversary Rock & Roll Hall of Fame Concerts	2010	
"He Was My Brother" (Note: "He Was My Brother" was later re-recorded by Simon only for its appearance on The Paul Simon Songbook (1965).) (with Art Garfunkel)	Wednesday Morning, 3 A.M.	1964	
"Hey, Schoolgirl" (with Art Garfunkel)	None	1957	
"Hobo's Blues"	Paul Simon	1972	
"Homeless" †	Graceland	1986	
"Homeward Bound" (with Art Garfunkel) #	Parsley, Sage, Rosemary and Thyme	1966	
"Horace and Pete"	Stranger to Stranger (Deluxe Edition)	2016	
"How Can You Live in the Northeast?"	Surprise	2006	
"How the Heart Approaches What It Yearns"	One-Trick Pony	1980	
"Hurricane Eye"	You're the One	2000	
"I Am a Rock" (Note: "I Am a Rock" was later re-recorded for its appearance on Simon & Garfunkel's Sounds of Silence (1966).) †	The Paul Simon Songbook	1965	
"(I Begin) To Think Again of You" (as a member of the Mystics)	None	1960	
"I'd Like to Be" (as Jerry Landis)	None	1960	
"I Do It for Your Love"	Still Crazy After All These Years	1975	
"I Don't Believe"	Surprise	2006	
"I Don't Believe Them" (as a member of Tico & the Triumphs)	None	1961	
"I Know What I Know"	Graceland	1986	
"I'm Lonely" (as Jerry Landis)	None	1961	
"I'm Lonesome"	None	1959	
"In a Parade"	Stranger to Stranger	2016	
"Insomniac's Lullaby"	Stranger to Stranger	2016	
"In the Garden of Edie"	Stranger to Stranger	2016	
"It Means a Lot to Them" (as Jerry Landis)	None	1961	
"I Wish I Weren't in Love" (as Jerry Landis)	None	1961	
"Jesus Is the Answer"	Paul Simon in Concert: Live Rhymin'	1974	
"Jonah"	One-Trick Pony	1980	
"Just a Boy" (as Jerry Landis)	None	1960	
"Kathy's Song" (Note: "Kathy's Song" was later re-recorded for its appearance on Simon & Garfunkel's Sounds of Silence (1966).)	The Paul Simon Songbook	1965	
"Keep the Customer Satisfied" (with Art Garfunkel)	Bridge over Troubled Water	1970	
"Killer Wants to Go to College"	Songs from The Capeman	1997	
"Killer Wants to Go to College II"	Songs from The Capeman	1997	
"Kodachrome" †	There Goes Rhymin' Simon	1973	
"Last Night I Had the Strangest Dream" (with Art Garfunkel)	Wednesday Morning, 3 A.M.	1964	
"The Late Great Johnny Ace"	Hearts and Bones	1983	
"Late in the Evening" †	One-Trick Pony	1980	
"Learn How to Fall"	There Goes Rhymin' Simon	1973	
"Leaves That Are Green" (Note: "Leaves That Are Green" was later re-recorded for its appearance on Simon & Garfunkel's Sounds of Silence (1966).)	The Paul Simon Songbook	1965	
"Let Me Live in Your City" (Work in Progress)	There Goes Rhymin' Simon (Reissue)	2004	
"Lisa" (as Jerry Landis)	None	1962	
"Look at That"	You're the One	2000	
"Looking At You"	None	1959	
"Loneliness" (as Jerry Landis)	None	1958	
"The Lone Teen Ranger" (as Jerry Landis)	None	1962	
"Long, Long Day" (with Patti Austin)	One-Trick Pony	1980	
"The Lord"	Seven Psalms	2023	
"Love"	You're the One	2000	
"Love and Blessings"	So Beautiful or So What	2011	
"Love and Hard Times"	So Beautiful or So What	2011	
"Love Is Eternal Sacred Light"	So Beautiful or So What	2011	
"Love is Like a Braid"	Seven Psalms	2023	
"Loves Me Like a Rock" †	There Goes Rhymin' Simon	1973	
"Maybellene" (Note: "Maybellene" is connected with "Kodachrome" on The Concert in Central Park (1982) but is presented separately here.) (with Art Garfunkel) #	The Concert in Central Park	1982	
"Me and Julio Down by the Schoolyard" †	Paul Simon	1972	
"Mother and Child Reunion" †	Paul Simon	1972	
"Motorcycle" (as a member of Tico & the Triumphs)	None	1961	
"Mrs. Robinson" (with Art Garfunkel) #	Bookends	1968	
"My Little Town" (with Art Garfunkel) #	Still Crazy After All These Years	1975	
"My Professional Opinion"	Seven Psalms	2023	
"New York Is My Home" (with Dion)	New York Is My Home	2016	
"Night Game"	Still Crazy After All These Years	1975	
"Nobody"	One-Trick Pony	1980	
"Noise" (as a member of Tico & the Triumphs)	None	1962	
"The Obvious Child" †	The Rhythm of the Saints	1990	
"Oh, Marion" †	One-Trick Pony	1980	
"Old" †	You're the One	2000	
"Old Friends" (with Art Garfunkel)	Bookends	1968	
"Once Upon a Time There Was an Ocean"	Surprise	2006	
"One Man's Ceiling Is Another Man's Floor"	There Goes Rhymin' Simon	1973	
"One-Trick Pony" †	One-Trick Pony	1980	
"The Only Living Boy in New York" (with Art Garfunkel)	Bridge over Troubled Water	1970	
"Our Song" (with Art Garfunkel)	None	1958	
"Outrageous" †	Surprise	2006	
"Overs" (with Art Garfunkel)	Bookends	1968	
"Papa Hobo"	Paul Simon	1972	
"Paranoia Blues"	Paul Simon	1972	
"Patterns" (Note: "Patterns" was later re-recorded for its appearance on Simon & Garfunkel's Parsley, Sage, Rosemary and Thyme (1966).)	The Paul Simon Songbook	1965	
"Peace Like a River"	Paul Simon	1972	
"Peggy-O" (with Art Garfunkel)	Wednesday Morning, 3 A.M.	1964	
"Pigs, Sheep and Wolves"	You're the One	2000	
"Play Me a Sad Song" (as Jerry Landis)	None	1961	
"(Pretty Baby) Don't Say Goodbye" (with Art Garfunkel)	None	1958	
"Proof" †	The Rhythm of the Saints	1990	
"Proof of Love"	Stranger to Stranger	2016	
"Punky's Dilemma" (with Art Garfunkel)	Bookends	1968	
"Quality"	Songs from The Capeman	1997	
"Questions for the Angels"	So Beautiful or So What	2011	
"Quiet"	You're the One	2000	
"Red Rubber Ball" (with Art Garfunkel) (The Cyrkle cover)	Old Friends	1997	
"Rene and Georgette Magritte with Their Dog After the War"	Hearts and Bones	1983	
"Rewrite"	So Beautiful or So What	2011	
"Richard Cory" (with Art Garfunkel)	Sounds of Silence	1966	
"The Riverbank"	Stranger to Stranger	2016	
"Rockabilly Music" (with Carl Perkins)	Go Cat Go	1996	
"Rose of Aberdeen" (with Art Garfunkel)	Sounds of Silence (Reissue)	2001	
"Roving Gambler" (with Art Garfunkel)	Sounds of Silence (Reissue)	2001	
"Run That Body Down"	Paul Simon	1972	
"The Rhythm of the Saints"	The Rhythm of the Saints	1990	
"The Sacred Harp"	Seven Psalms	2023	
"Satin Summer Nights"	Songs from The Capeman	1997	
"Save the Life of My Child" (with Art Garfunkel)	Bookends	1968	
"Scarborough Fair/Canticle" (with Art Garfunkel) #	Parsley, Sage, Rosemary and Thyme	1966	
"Señorita with a Necklace of Tears"	You're the One	2000	
"She Moves On"	The Rhythm of the Saints	1990	
"Shelter of Your Arms"	Hearts and Bones (Reissue)	2004	
"Shy" (as Jerry Landis)	None	1960	
"Shoplifting Clothes"	Songs from The Capeman	1997	
"The Side of a Hill"	The Paul Simon Songbook	1965	
"Silent Eyes"	Still Crazy After All These Years	1975	
"Simon Says"	None	1959	
"Slip Slidin' Away"	Greatest Hits, Etc.	1977	
"So Beautiful or So What"	So Beautiful or So What	2011	
"Soft Parachutes"	One-Trick Pony (Reissue)	2004	
"So Long, Frank Lloyd Wright" (with Art Garfunkel)	Bridge over Troubled Water	1970	
"Some Folks' Lives Roll Easy"	Still Crazy After All These Years	1975	
"Something So Right" †	There Goes Rhymin' Simon	1973	
"Somewhere They Can't Find Me" (with Art Garfunkel)	Sounds of Silence	1966	
"Song About the Moon"	Hearts and Bones	1983	
"Song for the Asking" (with Art Garfunkel)	Bridge over Troubled Water	1970	
"Song For Sam Cooke (Here in America" (with Dion)	None	2020	
"So Tenderly" (as a member of the Mystics)	None	1958	
"The Sound of Silence" (Note: "The Sound of Silence" was later re-recorded by Simon only for its appearance on The Paul Simon Songbook (1965).) (with Art Garfunkel) #	Wednesday Morning, 3 A.M.	1964	
"Sparrow" (with Art Garfunkel)	Wednesday Morning, 3 A.M.	1964	
"Spiral Highway"	One-Trick Pony (Reissue)	2004	
"Spirit Voices"	The Rhythm of the Saints	1990	
"Star Carol" (with Art Garfunkel)	Old Friends	1997	
"St. Judy's Comet"	There Goes Rhymin' Simon	1973	
"Still Crazy After All These Years" †	Still Crazy After All These Years	1975	
"Stranded in a Limousine" †	One-Trick Pony (Reissue)	2004	
"Stranger to Stranger"	Stranger to Stranger	2016	
"Street Angel"	Stranger to Stranger	2016	
"Sunday Afternoon"	Songs from The Capeman	1997	
"The Sun Is Burning" (with Art Garfunkel)	Wednesday Morning, 3 A.M.	1964	
"Sure Don't Feel Like Love"	Surprise	2006	
"Swanee" (as Jerry Landis)	None	1960	
"Take Me to the Mardi Gras" †	There Goes Rhymin' Simon	1973	
"Teen Age Fool" (as True Taylor)	None	1958	
"Tenderness"	There Goes Rhymin' Simon	1973	
"Ten Years"	None (Note: "10 Years" was written celebrating the tenth anniversary of The Oprah Winfrey Show.)	1995	
"That's Why God Made the Movies"	One-Trick Pony	1980	
"That Was Your Mother"	Graceland	1986	
"The Teacher"	You're the One	2000	
"That's Me" †	Surprise	2006	
"That Silver-Haired Daddy of Mine" (with Art Garfunkel) (Gene Autry and Jimmy Long cover)	Live 1969	2008	
"That's My Story" (with Art Garfunkel)	None	1958	
"That's Where I Belong"	You're the One	2000	
"Thelma"	The Rhythm of the Saints	1990	
"Think Too Much (a)" †	Hearts and Bones	1983	
"Think Too Much (b)"	Hearts and Bones	1983	
"Tia-Juana Blues"	None	1959	
"Time Is an Ocean"	Songs from The Capeman	1997	
"The Times They Are a-Changin'" (with Art Garfunkel) (Bob Dylan cover)	Wednesday Morning, 3 A.M.	1964	
"Toot, Toot, Tootsie, Goodbye" (as Jerry Landis)	None	1960	
"Train in the Distance"	Hearts and Bones	1983	
"Trail of Volcanoes"	Seven Psalms	2023	
"Trailways Bus"	Songs from The Capeman	1997	
"True or False" (as True Taylor)	None	1958	
"Two Teenagers" (with Art Garfunkel)	None	1958	
"Um Vento Passou" (with Milton Nascimento and Esperanza Spalding)	Um Vento Passou	2024	
"Under African Skies" †	Graceland	1986	
"The Vampires"	Songs from The Capeman	1997	
"Virgil"	Songs from The Capeman	1997	
"Voices of Old People" (with Art Garfunkel)	Bookends	1968	
"Wait"	Seven Psalms	2023	
"Wake Up Little Susie" (with Art Garfunkel) †	The Concert in Central Park	1982	
"The Wanderer" (with Dion DiMucci)	The 25th Anniversary Rock & Roll Hall of Fame Concerts	2010	
"Wartime Prayers"	Surprise	2006	
"Was a Sunny Day"	There Goes Rhymin' Simon	1973	
"Wednesday Morning, 3 A.M." (with Art Garfunkel)	Wednesday Morning, 3 A.M.	1964	
"The Werewolf"	Stranger to Stranger	2016	
"We've Got a Groovy Thing Goin'" (with Art Garfunkel)	Sounds of Silence	1966	
"When Numbers Get Serious"	Hearts and Bones	1983	
"Whispering Bells"	Graceland	2012	
"Why Don't You Write Me" (with Art Garfunkel)	Bridge over Troubled Water	1970	
"Wildflower" (as a member of Tico & the Triumphs)	None	1962	
"Wonderful World" (with Art Garfunkel and James Taylor) †	Watermark	1977	
"Wristband" †	Stranger to Stranger	2016	
"You Can Call Me Al" †	Graceland	1986	
"You Can Tell the World" (with Art Garfunkel)	Wednesday Morning, 3 A.M.	1964	
"You Don't Know Where Your Interest Lies" (with Art Garfunkel)	None (Note: "You Don't Know Where Your Interest Lies" was first released as the B-side to "Fakin' It" in 1967, and later re-released on the Bookends reissue.)	1967	
"Your Forgiveness"	Seven Psalms	2023	
"You're Kind"	Still Crazy After All These Years	1975	
"You're the One" †	You're the One	2000	
