= Flowers Never Bend with the Rainfall =

1965 song by Paul Simon

Song by Paul Simon

from the album The Paul Simon Songbook
- Released: August 1965
- Genre: Folk
- Length: 2:27
- Label: Columbia/CBS
- Songwriter: Paul Simon

"Flowers Never Bend with the Rainfall"

Song by Simon & Garfunkel

from the album Parsley, Sage, Rosemary and Thyme
- A-side: "I Am a Rock"
- Released: October 24, 1966
- Genre: Pop rock; folk
- Length: 2:10
- Label: Columbia
- Songwriter: Paul Simon

"Flowers Never Bend with the Rainfall" is a song by the American musician Paul Simon, later re-recorded by Simon & Garfunkel for their third studio album Parsley, Sage, Rosemary and Thyme.

== Lyrics ==
The song's lyrics talk about coping with reality and personal confusion. In Paul Simon: The Definitive Biography, Laura Jackson says "his mirror on the wall threw back an image dark and small, which to some degree depressed him."

== Recording ==
The song is played in the key of G on The Paul Simon Songbook but capoed up two frets to A on Parsley, Sage, Rosemary and Thyme.

== Reception ==
Hey Alma called it a "joyful blend of baritone and tenor".

Looking back 50 years to 1965, Cornell Banca said somewhat uncharitably the song and "A Most Peculiar Man" "confront the listener with similarly shallow "philosophical" reflections that sound engaging the first few times, and then pale on repeated listening."

The All Music Guide Required: Classic Rock book by Hal Leonard said it "was Simon at his most reflectively philosophical, dealing with age and its changes much as 'Patterns'"

Matthew Greenwald at AllMusic states "An almost dead ringer for "Red Rubber Ball," a Paul Simon song never recorded in the studio by Simon & Garfunkel (it was a hit by the Cyrcle), "Flowers That Never Bend With the Rainfall" is a simple yet very likeable slice of pop confection. As with many of Simon's songs, this is a simple yet insightful self-analysis, filled with pathos and humor. Musically, it showcases Simon's pop instincts in a very powerful and charming way. There are many other songs of his from this period that are indeed better, but the sense of craftsmanship easily puts it on the level of Simon's other, more ambitious creations."

== Covers ==
The live tribute band Toast recorded a cover of the song in 1970 that was later included on Under the Covers – Forty Great Paul Simon Cover Versions 1964–2017.
