= Parsley, Sage, Rosemary and Thyme =

1966 studio album by Simon & Garfunkel

Studio album by Simon & Garfunkel
- Released: October 10, 1966
- Recorded: December 1965 – August 1966
- Genre: Folk rock
- Length: 28:07 (Original US LP), 25:37 (UK LP), 33:02 (CD w/ bonus tracks)
- Label: Columbia
- Producer: Bob Johnston

Simon & Garfunkel chronology
Sounds of Silence (1966)	Parsley, Sage, Rosemary and Thyme (1966)	The Graduate (1968)

Singles from Parsley, Sage, Rosemary and Thyme
- 1. "Homeward Bound" Released: February 1966; 2. "The Dangling Conversation" Released: September 1966; 3. "Scarborough Fair/Canticle" Released: February 1968; 4. "The 59th Street Bridge Song (Feelin' Groovy)" Released: 1970

Parsley, Sage, Rosemary and Thyme is the third studio album by the American folk rock duo Simon & Garfunkel. Produced by Bob Johnston, the album was released on October 10, 1966, in the United States by Columbia Records. Following the success of the re-release of their debut single "The Sound of Silence", Simon & Garfunkel regrouped after a time apart while Columbia issued their second album, a rushed collection titled Sounds of Silence. For their third album, the duo spent almost three months in the studio working on instrumentation and production.

The album largely consists of acoustic pieces that were mostly written during Paul Simon's period in England the previous year, including some songs recycled from his debut solo record, The Paul Simon Songbook. The album includes the Garfunkel-led piece "For Emily, Whenever I May Find Her", as well as "7 O'Clock News/Silent Night", a combination of news reports of the day (the Vietnam War, the civil rights movement, the death of comedian Lenny Bruce), and the Christmas carol "Silent Night".

Many critics consider it a breakthrough in recording for the duo, and one of their best efforts. "Homeward Bound" had already been a top five hit in numerous countries and "Scarborough Fair/Canticle" performed similarly. The album peaked at number four on the Billboard Pop Album Chart and was eventually certified triple platinum by the Recording Industry Association of America. In 1999, the album was inducted into the Grammy Hall of Fame.

== Recording and production ==
Simon & Garfunkel were given four months to record the album, which allowed the duo considerable freedom in terms of creativity. The band's previous album, Sounds of Silence, was a "rush job" produced to capitalize on the success of their first hit single, "The Sound of Silence". The studio time for Parsley caused its budget to increase into an unusual cost for albums at that time—around $30,000 (US$297,692 in 2025 dollars), Simon speculated. Parsley was the first time Simon insisted on total control in aspects of recording. The album was the duo's first to be recorded on an eight-track recorder, which the duo persuaded Columbia Records to use. Vocal takes were overdubbed, as they found it difficult to get "decent separation" between Simon's voice and guitar. Columbia executives took notice of the longer production time, commenting, "Boy, you really take a lot of time to make records."

The bulk of Parsley was recorded over a week in June 1966, with an additional recording date in July and two in August. Two previously released songs from the December 1965 Sounds of Silence sessions were also added to the track listing: "Homeward Bound" had originally been released as the second single from that album but had been left off the track listing of the US LP release; and "Flowers Never Bend with the Rainfall" had already appeared on the B-side of "I Am a Rock". Garfunkel considered the recording of "Scarborough Fair" to be the moment the duo stepped into the role of producer because they were constantly beside Roy Halee mixing the track.

== Composition ==
"Scarborough Fair/Canticle"
16-second sample from Simon and Garfunkel's "Parsley, Sage, Rosemary and Thyme".

Parsley, Sage, Rosemary and Thyme is largely characterized by sharp contrasts from song to song. Simon found it difficult to write new songs; biographer Peter Ames Carlin notes that the sequence of promotion, including concerts and interviews, made Simon feel out of his element. "He needed things to be familiar", he wrote. In addition, sudden fame had affected both his relationships and him personally. Much of the album is composed of recycled songs written by Simon during his period in England in 1965. Three songs on the album—"Patterns", "Flowers Never Bend with the Rainfall", and "A Simple Desultory Philippic"—also appear on Simon's first solo effort, The Paul Simon Songbook ("Canticle", the second half of opening ballad "Scarborough Fair", is also culled from another song on the record, "The Side of a Hill").

"Scarborough Fair", from which the album's title is derived, a traditional ballad, combines "fingerpicked guitar accompaniment, delicate chimes, harpsichord embellishments, and the vocal blend". "Patterns" posits that the average life is no less predetermined than that of a rat in a maze. String snaps are used prominently in "Patterns", as well as a "syncopated bass and frenetic bongo part". Much of the original guitar line remains the same from its earlier incarnation. "Cloudy" revolves around "a hitchhiker's meanderings in northern California". It employs a "breezy, almost jazzy musical style". "Homeward Bound" carries a sense of melancholia, which biographer Marc Eliot attributed to an "echo of longing" that had resurfaced during the recording process over the failed relationship with Kathy Chitty. "The Big Bright Green Pleasure Machine" is a "satirical appropriation of an electric, organ-heavy psychedelic rock style", in which the singer complains of various woes in his life, which can be "readily eased" by purchasing the titular device. "The 59th Street Bridge Song (Feelin' Groovy)" is a brief vignette "made up of variations on a two-bar ostinato figure", in which the protagonist goes about a carefree morning.

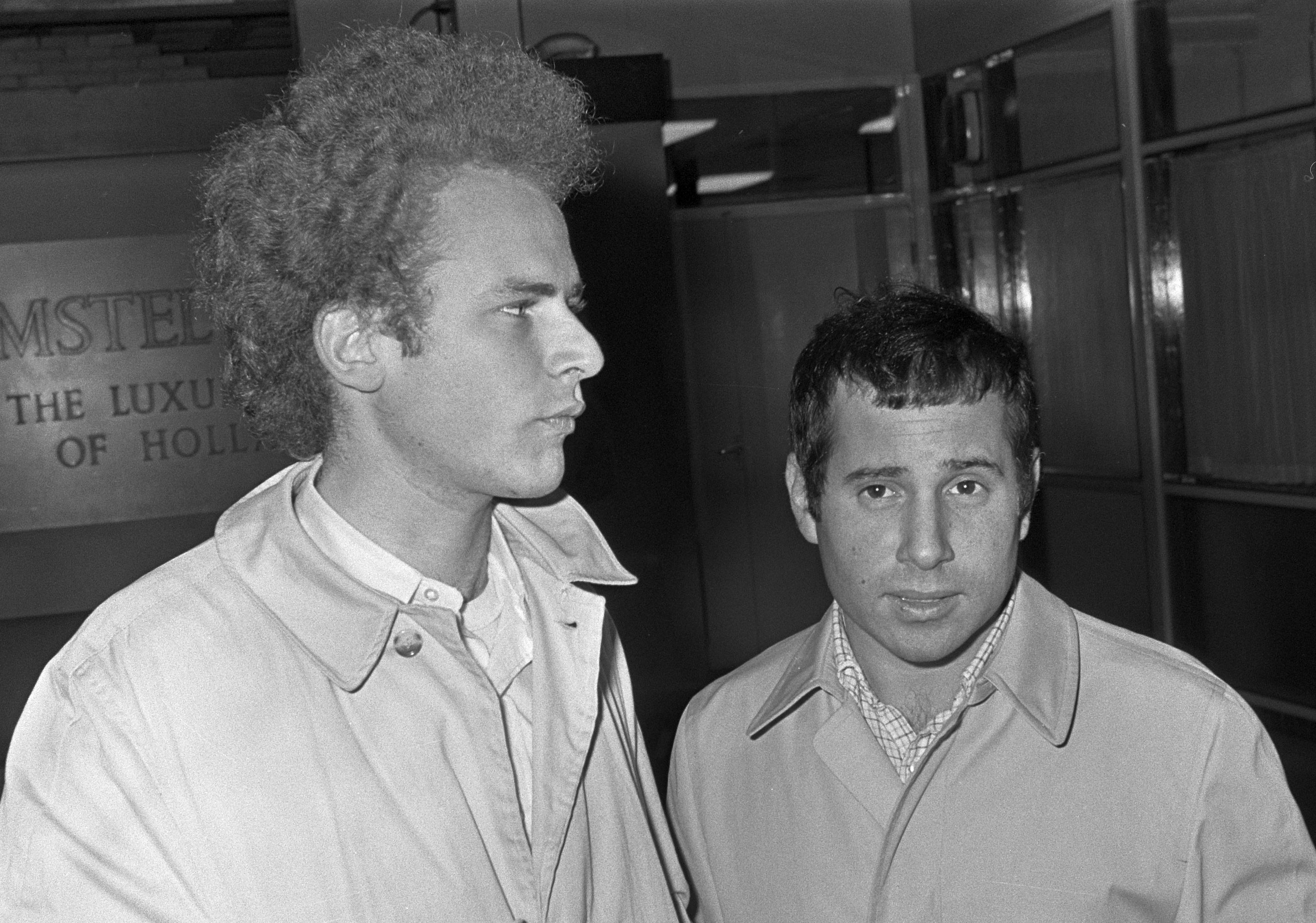
Simon & Garfunkel at Schiphol Airport, the Netherlands in 1966

"The Dangling Conversation" concerns a dying relationship, but Garfunkel disliked the song, feeling it pretentious. In contrast to its earlier appearance on The Paul Simon Songbook, "Flowers Never Bend with the Rainfall" appears here as a "folk combo that produces a bright, almost bluegrass sound". "A Simple Desultory Philippic" is a "satirical rant about the singer's confrontations with a wide variety of pop-culture personalities and phenomena". In the song, Simon vocally imitates Bob Dylan, as well as his harmonica interjections. "For Emily, Whenever I May Find Her" has sometimes been thought to be named after poet Emily Dickinson. Simon later explained that "For Emily" is not about an imaginary girl Emily, but about the belief in true love, while the song "Overs" (from the album Bookends) is about the loss of that belief. While other songs, such as "The Sound of Silence", had taken months for Simon to complete writing, others, such as "For Emily", were written in a single night. "A Poem on the Underground Wall" largely revolves around a man creating graffiti on a sign in a subway station, with Simon also bringing into play "a variety of visceral and religious images".

"7 O'Clock News/Silent Night" is a sound collage consisting of the duo singing "Silent Night" in two-part harmony over an arpeggiated piano part while a news report plays. "The result rather bluntly makes an ironic commentary on various social ills by juxtaposing them with tenderly expressed Christmas sentiments." The simulated newscast was voiced by Charlie O'Donnell, then a radio disc jockey.

== Cover artwork ==
Shot by photographer Bob Cato, the cover depicts Simon & Garfunkel in a flower garden. "Artie is sprawled in jeans and a royal blue sweater, while Paul rises just behind, the modern poet-troubadour clad in cambric and shadow," wrote Peter Ames Carlin in Simon's biography, Homeward Bound. The original back cover of the LP includes an essay by music critic Ralph J. Gleason.

== Songwriting credit disputes ==
There were some copyright disputes about the album's contents. "Cloudy" was co-written by Bruce Woodley, who did not initially receive credit upon the album's release. He still collected royalty payments for the song, but was not listed as an official writer as Simon "needed" it to be credited to him alone. Martin Carthy, who had first introduced Simon to "Scarborough Fair" during his time in England, was never credited. Worse, according to Peter Ames Carlin, "it credited Paul and Artie as co-authors, as if the centuries-old tune had emerged entirely from their imaginations." Columbia was contacted by Carthy's publishing company, Sparta Florida, to claim royalties, and they complied. However, as Carlin notes, "none of the money ever got to Carthy" due to fine-print on a contract he had never read that ceded his stake in the song.

== Release ==
After issuing several singles and receiving sold-out college campus shows, Parsley, Sage, Rosemary and Thyme was released by Columbia Records on October 24, 1966. The duo resumed their trek on the college circuit eleven days following the release, crafting an image that was described as "alienated", "weird", and "poetic". Manager Mort Lewis also was largely responsible for this public perception, as he withheld them from television appearances (unless they were allowed to play an uninterrupted set or choose the setlist).

== Reception ==
Bruce Eder of AllMusic called it the duo's "first masterpiece", one that regarded "youthful exuberance and alienation, [proving] perennially popular among older, more thoughtful high-school students and legions of college audiences across generations." Andy Fyfe of BBC Music wrote in 2009 that he felt the record carried a sense of timelessness, calling its "boldest themes [...] still worryingly pertinent today", while remarking that the record as a whole "reflected the social upheaval of the mid-60s while playing as substantial a part in folk rock's evolution."

In 2003, Rolling Stone listed the album at number 201 on their list of The 500 Greatest Albums of All Time, dropping one position to number 202 in a 2012 revised list. Disc jockey and author Pete Fornatale wrote that "Few others have come close to the intelligence, beauty, variety, creativity, and craftsmanship that Parsley, Sage, Rosemary and Thyme captured." Andrew Gilbert, in 1001 Albums You Must Hear Before You Die, called it "their first great album", producing "a sense of impending doom and Simon's insistence on emotional connection that makes the album such an enduring work."

=== Accolades ===
Publication	Country	Accolade	Year	Rank
Robert Dimery	US	1001 Albums You Must Hear Before You Die	2005	*
Rolling Stone	US	The 500 Greatest Albums of All Time	2012	202

(*) designates unordered lists.

== Track listing ==
=== Original release ===
All tracks are written by Paul Simon except where noted.

Side one
No.	Title	Writer(s)	Recorded	Length
1.	"Scarborough Fair/Canticle"	Traditional; arranged by Simon and Art Garfunkel	July 26, 1966	3:10
2.	"Patterns"		June 8, 1966	2:42
3.	"Cloudy"	Simon, Bruce Woodley	June 10, 1966	2:13
4.	"Homeward Bound"		December 14, 1965	2:30
5.	"The Big Bright Green Pleasure Machine"		June 15, 1966	2:44
6.	"The 59th Street Bridge Song (Feelin' Groovy)"		August 16, 1966	1:49
Total length:				15:08

Side two
No.	Title	Writer(s)	Recorded	Length
1.	"The Dangling Conversation"		June 21, 1966	2:37
2.	"Flowers Never Bend with the Rainfall"		December 22, 1965	2:10
3.	"A Simple Desultory Philippic (or How I Was Robert McNamara'd into Submission)"		June 13, 1966	2:15
4.	"For Emily, Whenever I May Find Her"		August 22, 1966	2:04
5.	"A Poem on the Underground Wall"		June 13, 1966	1:52
6.	"7 O'Clock News/Silent Night"	Josef Mohr, Franz Gruber (Note: Paul Simon received a writing credit for the song.)	August 22, 1966	2:01
Total length:				12:59 28:07

Bonus tracks (2001 CD reissue)
No.	Title	Recorded	Length
13.	"Patterns" (Demo, previously unreleased)	June 7, 1966	2:53
14.	"A Poem on the Underground Wall" (Demo, previously unreleased)	June 12, 1966	2:02
Total length:			4:55 33:02

The original UK edition LP omitted "Homeward Bound" as it was added to the UK edition of Sounds of Silence, reducing the length of side one to 12:38 and the total length to 25:37.

== Personnel ==
Simon & Garfunkel

- Paul Simon – vocals, guitar, harmonica on "A Simple Desultory Philippic (or How I Was Robert McNamara'd into Submission)”
- Art Garfunkel – vocals, piano on "7 O'Clock News/Silent Night"

Additional musicians

- Hal Blaine – drums
- Joe South – electric guitar on "Flowers Never Bend With The Rainfall"
- Carol Kaye – bass guitar on "Scarborough Fair/Canticle" and "Homeward Bound"
- John Meszar – harpsichord on "Scarborough Fair/Canticle"
- Larry Knechtel – organ on "Homeward Bound"
- Joe Morello – drums on "The 59th Street Bridge Song"
- Eugene Wright – double bass on "The 59th Street Bridge Song"
- Charlie O'Donnell – spoken vocals on "7 O'Clock News/Silent Night"
- Unknown – strings on “The Dangling Conversation”
- Unknown - recorder on "The 59th Street Bridge Song"

Production

- Bob Johnston – production
- Roy Halee – recording engineer
- Bob Cato – cover photography

== Charts ==
=== Weekly charts ===
Chart (1966)	Peak position
Australian Albums (ARIA)	14
Canada RPM	8
US Billboard 200	4

Chart (1968)	Peak position
UK Albums (Official Charts)	13

=== Certifications ===
Region	Certification	Certified units/sales
United Kingdom (BPI)	Silver	60,000^{‡}
United States (RIAA)	3× Platinum	3,000,000^{^}
^{^} Shipments figures based on certification alone.^{‡} Sales+streaming figures based on certification alone.

== Trivia ==
The song "A Poem on the Underground Wall" was inspired by vulgar graffiti that was present in the album cover for "Wednesday Morning 3 A.M.".

=== Sources ===
- Bennighof, James (2007). The Words and Music of Paul Simon. Greenwood Publishing Group. ISBN 978-0-275-99163-0.
- Carlin, Peter Ames (2016). Homeward Bound: The Life of Paul Simon. Henry Holt and Co. ISBN 978-1-627-79034-5.
- Eliot, Marc (2010). Paul Simon: A Life. John Wiley and Sons. ISBN 978-0-470-43363-8.
- Fornatale, Pete (2007). Simon and Garfunkel's Bookends. Rodale. ISBN 978-1-59486-427-8.
