= The Graduate (soundtrack) =

Soundtrack album by Simon & Garfunkel
- Released: January 21, 1968
- Recorded: 1967
- Genre: Folk rock
- Length: 36:45
- Label: Columbia Masterworks
- Producer: Teo Macero

Simon & Garfunkel chronology
Parsley, Sage, Rosemary and Thyme (1966)	The Graduate (1968)	Bookends (1968)

Singles from The Graduate
- 1. "Mrs. Robinson" Released: April 1968

The Graduate is a 1968 album of songs and music from the soundtrack of Mike Nichols' film The Graduate. It includes five songs from the folk-rock duo Simon & Garfunkel, including "Mrs. Robinson", a work in progress which Simon adapted to fit the movie, along with several instrumental pieces by Dave Grusin. Released January 21 on Columbia Masterworks, the album was produced by Teo Macero. In March of the following year, Simon and Grusin won the 1968 Grammy Award for "Best Original Score Written for a Motion Picture or Television Special". "Mrs Robinson" received the Grammy for "Record of the Year", whilst Simon & Garfunkel collected the "Best Contemporary-pop Performance, Vocal Duo or Group" award.

Although the album features two versions of "Mrs. Robinson", neither is the full version as featured on Bookends, which was composed later. The first consists of relentless, sharp guitar chords, with the "dee-de-dee-dee" sung motif, while the second includes a chorus, before tapering off as it does in the film. The other major song of the album, the 1965 hit "The Sound of Silence", is used three times in the film. Both songs have been inducted into the Grammy Hall of Fame (in 1999 and 2004 respectively).

Professional ratings
Review scores
Source	Rating
AllMusic	3/5 stars
Pitchfork	6.2/10

== Track listing ==
Side one
No.	Title	Writer(s)	Performer	Length
1.	"The Sound of Silence" (Remix (Note: Often listed as the "Electric Version"))	Paul Simon	Simon & Garfunkel	3:06
2.	"The Singleman Party Foxtrot"	Dave Grusin	Dave Grusin	2:52
3.	"Mrs. Robinson" (Version 1)	Simon	Simon & Garfunkel	1:12
4.	"Sunporch Cha-Cha-Cha"	Grusin	Dave Grusin	2:53
5.	"Scarborough Fair/Canticle" (Interlude)	Traditional, arranged by Paul Simon and Art Garfunkel	Simon & Garfunkel	1:41
6.	"On the Strip"	Grusin	Dave Grusin	2:00
7.	"April Come She Will"	Simon	Simon & Garfunkel	1:50
8.	"The Folks"	Grusin	Dave Grusin	2:27
Total length:				18:01

Side two
No.	Title	Writer(s)	Performer	Length
9.	"Scarborough Fair/Canticle" (Extended version)	Traditional, arranged by Paul Simon and Art Garfunkel	Simon & Garfunkel	6:22
10.	"A Great Effect"	Grusin	Dave Grusin	4:06
11.	"The Big Bright Green Pleasure Machine" (Alternate version)	Simon	Simon & Garfunkel	1:46
12.	"Whew"	Grusin	Dave Grusin	2:10
13.	"Mrs. Robinson" (Version 2)	Simon	Simon & Garfunkel	1:12
14.	"The Sound of Silence" (Alternate version (Note: Often listed as the "Reprise"))	Simon	Simon & Garfunkel	3:08
Total length:				18:44 36:45

== Personnel ==
- Paul Simon – vocals, guitar
- Art Garfunkel – vocals
- Dave Grusin – additional music

== Charts ==
Chart (1968)	Peak position
Australia (Kent Music Report)	1
Dutch Album Chart	10
Spanish Albums Chart	2
UK Albums (OCC)	3
US Billboard 200	1

== Certifications ==
Region	Certification	Certified units/sales
Canada (Music Canada)	Platinum	100,000^{^}
France (SNEP)	Gold	100,000^{*}
United Kingdom (BPI)	Gold	100,000^{‡}
United States (RIAA)	2× Platinum	2,000,000^{^}
^{*} Sales figures based on certification alone.^{^} Shipments figures based on certification alone.^{‡} Sales+streaming figures based on certification alone.
