= Leaves That Are Green =

Song by Simon and Garfunkel

from the album Sounds of Silence
- A-side: "Homeward Bound"
- Genre: Folk pop, folk rock
- Length: 2:20
- Label: Columbia Records
- Songwriter: Paul Simon

"Leaves That Are Green" is a song written and originally recorded by Paul Simon for his 1965 album The Paul Simon Songbook. It was later re-recorded with Art Garfunkel for the 1966 album Sounds of Silence, adding an electric harpsichord, rhythm guitar, and bass. It was also the B-side to the hit song "Homeward Bound".

== Reception ==
Cash Box described the song as a "melodic ballad about the ever-constant aging process". Allmusic critic Matthew Greenwald described the music as having a "sprightly folk-pop tempo and feel" with "inventive percussion and harpsichord", and described the lyrics as using "changing seasons to convey the feelings at the disintegration of a romance". Simon biographer Laura Jackson described the song as "peaceful number" in which Simon uses the changing seasons to illustrate that time goes on, and all things come and go. Simon biographer Cornel Bonca criticizes the "cliched nature imagery" but notes that the "delightful" harpsichord opening "belies the lyrics' winsome gloom". On the other hand, music critic Paul Williams used a line from "Leaves That Are Green" to demonstrate Simon's skill as a phrasemaker with a gift for words: "She faded in the night like a poem I meant to write...and the leaves that are green turn to brown."

Music journalist David Browne considered the theme of the song to be "premature nostalgia". Music journalist Chris Charlesworth considers "Leaves That Are Green" to be Simon's first and possibly prettiest of many of Simon's songs that deal with the passage of time. Charlesworth praised the "intricate guitar picking" but criticizes a "failure of the imagination" in the third verse, where the lyrics just say hello and goodbye.

== Performances ==
Simon played "Leaves That Are Green" at a live concert at his alma mater Queens College in 1964, where he also played "The Sound of Silence". Simon & Garfunkel performed the song live on their 2004 tour.

== Influence and covers ==
The opening lines were quoted by Billy Bragg's song "A New England".

Dorris Henderson covered "Leaves That Are Green" as a single in 1965.
