= I Am a Rock =

1965 song written by Paul Simon

- 45 RPM picture sleeve

Single by Paul Simon

from the album The Paul Simon Songbook
- B-side: "Leaves That Are Green"
- Released: 1965
- Genre: Folk rock
- Length: 2:42
- Label: CBS
- Songwriter: Paul Simon
- Producers: Stanley West, Reginald Warburton

Paul Simon singles chronology
"I Am a Rock" (1965)	"Mother and Child Reunion" (1972)

"I Am a Rock" is a song written by Paul Simon. It was first performed by Simon as the opening track on his album The Paul Simon Songbook which he originally recorded and released in August 1965, only in the United Kingdom. Paul Simon and Art Garfunkel, as the American folk rock duo Simon & Garfunkel, re-recorded it on December 14, 1965, and included it as the final track on their album Sounds of Silence, which they released on January 17, 1966. It was released as a single in 1966, and subsequently included as the B-side of the 1971 A-side reissue of "The 59th Street Bridge Song (Feelin' Groovy)".

== Writing, recording, and commercial success ==
=== Solo-acoustic version ===
Thematically, "I Am a Rock" deals with isolation and emotional detachment. The song was not included on Simon & Garfunkel's acoustic debut album, Wednesday Morning, 3 A.M., which was released on October 19, 1964. Some sources say that it was performed by Simon on January 27, 1965, on a promo show for the BBC. Simon likely began writing the song before the end of January 1964, and had it completed by May 1965, when he first recorded it. It was included on his solo-acoustic The Paul Simon Songbook LP released in the UK in the summer of 1965.

Until 1981, the initial recording of "I Am a Rock" on The Paul Simon Song Book remained unavailable in North America. This was partly because Simon himself was dissatisfied with the album, saying on the album's liner notes:

This L.P. contains twelve of the songs that I have written over the past two years. There are some here that I would not write today. I don't believe in them as I once did. I have included them because they played an important role in the transition. It is discomforting, almost painful, to look back over something someone else created and realize that someone else was you. I am not ashamed of where I've been and what I've thought. It's just not me anymore. It is perfectly clear to me that the songs I write today will not be mine tomorrow. I don't regret the loss.

As a result, the Song Book album was only made available in North America when it was released as part of the boxed set of albums Paul Simon: Collected Works. The album was not released on CD until March 23, 2004. For this release Columbia included two bonus tracks, one of which was an alternate take of "I Am a Rock", during which one can plainly hear Simon stamping his foot for a beat.

In 1965, the solo-acoustic version "I Am a Rock" was also released as a rare A-side of a single in the UK, backed with "Leaves That are Green".

=== Electric version with Garfunkel ===
"I Am a Rock"

Single by Simon & Garfunkel

from the album Sounds of Silence
- B-side: "Flowers Never Bend with the Rainfall"
- Released: May 1966
- Recorded: December 14, 1965
- Genre: Folk rock; jangle pop
- Length: 2:52
- Label: Columbia
- Songwriter: Paul Simon
- Producer: Bob Johnston

Simon & Garfunkel singles chronology
"Homeward Bound" (1966)	"I Am a Rock" (1966)	"The Dangling Conversation" (1966)

Audio sample
- file; help

While Simon was in Denmark during the summer of 1965, Tom Wilson, the producer of Wednesday Morning, 3 A.M., responded to requests for "The Sound of Silence" from American radio stations and dubbed an electric guitar, bass, and drums onto the original track. He then released the song as a single, whereupon it entered the United States pop charts. When Simon heard about the success of this song, he was still touring in Europe as a solo folk singer.

Simon immediately returned to the United States, and with Garfunkel in December 1965 began a series of hasty recording sessions to match the electric "mold" created by Wilson with many of the other songs that Simon had recorded on the Song Book, including "I Am a Rock," which was re-recorded during these sessions on December 14, 1965. The result was the album Sounds of Silence, which the duo released the following January. "I Am a Rock" was the fifth and closing track on Side 2 of the record. Along with most of the other tracks on the album, it was produced by Bob Johnston and recorded in New York at Columbia Recording Studios using some of the same session players that had appeared on Bob Dylan's recent Highway 61 Revisited LP.

The album quickly capitalized on the success of the new album's title track as a No. 1 single, and itself rose to No. 21 on the Billboard charts. The duo cashed in quickly on their new-found success. They released "I Am a Rock" as a single in the late spring of 1966, and the song reached No. 3 on the Billboard Hot 100 charts, the third single (chronologically) by Simon & Garfunkel to reach the top 5 (after "The Sound of Silence" and "Homeward Bound").

This single had two incarnations. First, as a promotion, it was released on red vinyl to radio stations, with a mono mix on one side and a stereo version on the other. These copies are somewhat difficult to locate for collectors. The standard version sold in stores, however, was the black vinyl 45 rpm record with the red Columbia Records label. The B-side was a version of "Flowers Never Bend with the Rainfall," which was later released on Simon & Garfunkel's even-more-successful (and critically acclaimed) album Parsley, Sage, Rosemary and Thyme. The single mix of the song features a more prominent lead vocal track (and different phrasing in the opening lines) by Paul Simon, and less reverb, than the more common LP version.

Billboard described the song as a "beautiful lyric ballad". Cash Box described the song as a "hard-driving, pulsating ode about rather isolated young man". Record World said that the duo "sing about loneliness in usual poetic terms".

=== Personnel ===
Credits are adapted from The Words and Music of Paul Simon.

Simon & Garfunkel

- Paul Simon – vocals, acoustic guitar
- Art Garfunkel – vocals

Additional musicians

- Hal Blaine – drums
- Carol Kaye – bass guitar
- Larry Knechtel – organ
- Joe South – electric guitar

== Chart performance ==
=== Weekly charts ===
Chart (1966)	Peak position
Australian Kent Music Report	20
Canada RPM Top Singles	6
Dutch Singles Chart	10
New Zealand (Listener)	2
Swedish Singles Chart	10
UK Singles Chart	17
US Billboard Hot 100	3
US Cash Box Top 100	4
West Germany (GfK)	35

=== Year-end charts ===
Chart (1966)	Rank
US Billboard Hot 100	42
US Cash Box	40

== Certifications ==
Region	Certification	Certified units/sales
United Kingdom (BPI)	Silver	200,000^{‡}
^{‡} Sales+streaming figures based on certification alone.

== Other versions ==
- It was covered in 1966 by The Hollies on their fourth album Would You Believe?.
- It was covered in 1966 by The Grass Roots on their first album Where Were You When I Needed You.
- It was covered in 1982 by The Church on their EP Singsongs.
- It was covered in 2016 by Tim Heidecker, with parodic lyrics, as "I Am a Cuck".
- It was covered in 2018 by Billie Joe Armstrong under his band The Longshot on the EP Return to Sender
