= The Paul Simon Songbook =

Studio album by Paul Simon
- Released: August 1965
- Recorded: June–July 1965
- Studio: Levy's (London)
- Genre: Folk
- Length: 37:48
- Label: CBS
- Producers: Reginald Warburton, Stanley West

Paul Simon chronology
The Paul Simon Songbook (1965)	Paul Simon (1972)

Singles from The Paul Simon Songbook
- 1. "I Am a Rock" b/w "Leaves That Are Green" Released: 1965

The Paul Simon Songbook is the debut solo studio album by the American singer-songwriter Paul Simon, released in the UK in 1965 by CBS. Featuring Simon alone, it was recorded in London after he emigrated there, following the U.S. release and subsequent limited success of Simon & Garfunkel's debut album Wednesday Morning, 3 A.M. (1964). Songbook features solo re-recordings of two songs from that album, as well as nine songs that would later be re-recorded by the duo for other studio albums such as Sounds of Silence (1966) and Parsley, Sage, Rosemary and Thyme (1966). After a very brief release in the U.S. in 1969, Songbook was later made available there as part of the LP box set Paul Simon: Collected Works (1981). It was released on CD in 2004.

== Background ==
As of 1965, Paul Simon's only recordings available in Britain consisted of three singles released on various labels, two of which were rock and roll-inspired recordings with Art Garfunkel, under the name Tom & Jerry.

The other single was "He Was My Brother" backed with "Carlos Dominguez", recorded by Simon under the pseudonym Paul Kane, inspired by his love for the film Citizen Kane (1941). "Carlos Dominguez" had initially been, unbeknownst to Simon, licensed out in London and recorded by popular UK artist Val Doonican. This resulted in a publishing deal for Simon in England, culminating with the release of the Paul Kane solo single there in May of 1964.

After Simon & Garfunkel's debut album, Wednesday Morning 3 A.M. (1964), had failed to achieve success in the U.S., Simon moved to London and performed in coffeehouses there, building up a following that eventually led to a performance at the BBC. Songbook was then recorded to satisfy demand in the UK for recordings of his music, since Wednesday Morning 3 A.M. had not been released there. Simon's deal with Columbia Records in America allowed him to record for the British equivalent, CBS.

During 1965, Simon played in Paris, Haarlem, and Copenhagen, along with London and other locations in the UK.

== Recording ==
Simon recorded Songbook at Levy's Recording Studio, New Bond Street, London, over several dates in June 1965. The songs feature Simon alone, singing to his own acoustic guitar accompaniment.

Two songs on the album ("The Sound of Silence" and "He Was My Brother") were re-recordings of songs originally found on Wednesday Morning, 3 A.M. Nine of the other songs would subsequently be re-recorded by Simon & Garfunkel and released on their albums Sounds of Silence (1965) and Parsley, Sage, Rosemary and Thyme (1966).

The lyrics to "The Side of a Hill" were later reworked and sung as counterpoint to "Scarborough Fair" on Parsley, Sage, Rosemary and Thyme. The lyrics to both "The Side of a Hill" and "Canticle" are absent from Simon's 2008 book Lyrics 1964–2008.

== Artwork and packaging ==
Regarding the songs, Simon's 1965 liner notes for the album state that "there are some I would not write today", but that they "played an important role in the transition".

The album cover shows Simon and his then-girlfriend, Kathy Chitty, sitting on "narrow streets of cobblestone" in London, the city Simon had adopted as his home, and holding wooden figurines. In the 1970s, the album art was altered: the picture of Simon and Chitty was flipped horizontally, and the red script-like lettering eliminated in favor of an album title in white block print at the top.

== Release ==
The Paul Simon Songbook yielded the single "I Am a Rock" / "Leaves That Are Green".

The album was later issued in the U.S. by Columbia very briefly in 1969 but was recalled within a few days when Simon objected. It was re-released on LP in 1981 on the Columbia "Collected Works" boxed set. The mono version was released on CD in 2004 by Columbia/Legacy and features two bonus tracks: alternative versions of "I Am a Rock" and "A Church Is Burning".

Professional ratings
Review scores
Source	Rating
AllMusic	4/5 stars
Robert Christgau (via Blender)	2/5 stars
Music Box	4/5 stars
Record Mirror	3/5 stars
Rolling Stone	3/5 stars
Paste	8.0/10

== Track listing ==
All tracks are written by Paul Simon. Tracks 7 and 9 credited to "Paul Kane".

Side one
No.	Title	Length
1.	"I Am a Rock"	2:52
2.	"Leaves That Are Green"	2:41
3.	"A Church Is Burning"	3:38
4.	"April Come She Will"	1:55
5.	"The Sound of Silence"	3:19
6.	"A Most Peculiar Man"	2:26
Total length:		16:51

Side two
No.	Title	Length
1.	"He Was My Brother"	2:58
2.	"Kathy's Song"	3:42
3.	"The Side of a Hill"	2:28
4.	"A Simple Desultory Philippic (Or How I Was Robert McNamara'd Into Submission)"	2:25
5.	"Flowers Never Bend with the Rainfall"	2:27
6.	"Patterns"	3:13
Total length:		17:03 33:54

2004 CD bonus tracks
No.	Title	Length
13.	"I Am a Rock" (alternate version)	2:44
14.	"A Church Is Burning" (alternate version)	3:10
Total length:		5:54 39:48

== Personnel ==
- Paul Simon – vocals, acoustic guitar

Technical

- Reginald Warburton – producer
- Stanley West – producer
- Verity Graphic Arts – cover design
- David Lowe – photography
- Paul Simon – liner notes
- Judith Piepe – song notes
- Art Garfunkel – song notes ("He Was My Brother")

== Bibliography ==
- Patrick Humphries, Paul Simon: Still Crazy After All These Years (New York: Doubleday, 1989). ISBN 0-385-24908-X.
