= A Simple Desultory Philippic (or How I Was Robert McNamara'd into Submission) =

1965 song by Paul Simon

"A Simple Desultory Philippic (Or How I Was Robert McNamara'd into Submission)"

Song by Paul Simon

from the album The Paul Simon Songbook
- Released: August 1965
- Recorded: June–July 1965
- Studio: Levy's Recording, London
- Genre: Rock
- Length: 2:25
- Label: CBS
- Songwriter: Paul Simon
- Producers: Reginald Warburghton, Stanley West

"A Simple Desultory Philippic (Or How I Was Robert McNamara'd into Submission)"

Song by Simon & Garfunkel

from the album Parsley, Sage, Rosemary and Thyme
- Released: October 24, 1966
- Recorded: June 13, 1966
- Length: 2:15
- Label: Columbia
- Songwriter: Paul Simon
- Producer: Bob Johnston

"A Simple Desultory Philippic (Or How I Was Robert McNamara'd Into Submission)" is a song written by American singer-songwriter Paul Simon. Originally recorded for Simon's 1965 UK-only debut, The Paul Simon Songbook, it was recorded soon after by Simon and his partner, Art Garfunkel, for the duo's third album, Parsley, Sage, Rosemary and Thyme.

It is generally considered a parody of American musician Bob Dylan's writing style, especially that of "Subterranean Homesick Blues", released on Dylan's 1965 album Bringing It All Back Home. The original version was subtitled "Or how I was Lyndon Johnson'd into Submission" in a spoken introduction at the beginning, after Simon announced the song's title. The subtitle does not appear on the sleeve or the disc label. "Desultory" means lacking in consistency, disconnected, random, and a philippic is a fiery, damning speech or tirade, delivered to condemn a particular political actor.

== Recording history ==
Simon's original, solo performance found on The Paul Simon Songbook is less well known than Simon & Garfunkel's; the album remained out of print until 2004, when it was re-released by Columbia/Legacy.

In early 1965, Simon was in the midst of a period in which he went back and forth between the United States and Great Britain. Eventually spending most of 1965 in Britain, he recorded The Paul Simon Songbook in London, while making a living singing at folk clubs in Britain. During this period he was also writing with Bruce Woodley of the Seekers.

The original version is significantly different from the later, better-known recording. The chords strongly resemble the Everly Brothers' chord design for Wake Up Little Susie, and while many of the lyrics are the same, there are noticeable divergences from the Simon & Garfunkel version.

The album's liner notes by Judith Piepe, state of the song: "This is, of course, a take-off, a take-on, a private joke, but no joke is all that private or any less serious for being a joke."

In 1966, together with Art Garfunkel, Simon re-recorded the song for the duo's album Parsley, Sage, Rosemary and Thyme, with several changes to the lyrics. The list of names dropped is revised.

== Lyrics ==
=== Bob Dylan references ===
When Simon complains about a man who is, "...so unhip, when you say Dylan he thinks you're talking about Dylan Thomas," the next line in the London solo version is "It's all right Ma. It's just something I learned over in England," referencing the Dylan songs "It's Alright, Ma (I'm Only Bleeding)" and "I Shall Be Free No. 10". However, the Simon and Garfunkel song says, "It's all right Ma. Everybody must get stoned." the second part referencing the Dylan song "Rainy Day Women No. 12 & 35". There is another potential Dylan reference in the line "I just discovered somebody's tapped my phone," possibly alluding to "Subterranean Homesick Blues" where Dylan sings that "the phone's tapped anyway." In the 1965 original, the line was "Barry Kornfeld's mother's on the phone."

At the end of the 1966 recording Simon says, "Folk rock," and, after an audible noise, "I've lost my harmonica, Albert." This presumably refers to Dylan's manager, Albert Grossman. In the 1965 version, however, Simon sings, "When in London, do as I do: find yourself a friendly haiku... Go to sleep for ten or fifteen years." This could be a reference to Simon's girlfriend at that time, Kathy Chitty, whom people referred to as 'The Haiku'.

=== References mentioned in lyrics ===
In 1965:

- Lyndon Johnson, President of the United States (1963–1969)
- Union Jack, flag of the United Kingdom
- Jack Kerouac, American novelist
- John Birch, American Baptist missionary and martyr; namesake of American politically right-wing John Birch Society active in that period
- Larry Adler, noted harmonica player
- Walt Disney, American film producer
- Diz Disley, British jazz guitarist
- John Lennon, member of The Beatles
- Krishna Menon, Indian politician
- Walter Brennan, American actor
- Cassius Clay, American boxer, later known as Muhammad Ali
- James Joyce, Irish writer and poet
- Rolls-Royce British luxury car maker
- Tom Wilson, record producer who produced several of Bob Dylan's 1960s LPs, Simon & Garfunkel's début album, and the electric version of "The Sound of Silence"
- Barry Kornfeld, second guitarist on Simon and Garfunkel's Wednesday Morning, 3 A.M. album

In 1966:

- Norman Mailer, American writer
- Maxwell Taylor, American soldier and diplomat
- John O'Hara, American writer
- Robert McNamara, American political figure (U.S. Secretary of Defense at the time)
- Phil Spector, record producer
- Lou Adler, record producer
- Barry Sadler, U.S. Army Green Beret and American musician
- Roy Halee, Simon and Garfunkel's record producer

In both:

- The Rolling Stones, British rock group
- The Beatles, British pop and rock group
- Ayn Rand, novelist and philosopher
- Art Garfunkel, American singer, Paul Simon's partner in Simon and Garfunkel
- Dylan Thomas, Welsh poet and writer – as opposed to Bob Dylan, American singer and songwriter
- Lenny Bruce, American comedian
- Mick Jagger, frontman of The Rolling Stones
- "Silver Dagger", nineteenth-century folk song largely associated with Joan Baez
- Andy Warhol, American visual artist
