= April Come She Will =

Song by Simon & Garfunkel

from the album Sounds of Silence
- Recorded: December 21, 1965
- Genre: Folk
- Length: 1:51
- Label: Columbia
- Songwriter: Paul Simon
- Producers: Paul Simon; Bob Johnston; Roy Halee

"April Come She Will" is a song by American music duo Simon & Garfunkel from their second studio album, Sounds of Silence (1966). It originally appeared on the solo album The Paul Simon Songbook. It is the B-side to the hit single "Scarborough Fair/Canticle". It is included on The Graduate soundtrack album and was additionally released on the "Mrs. Robinson" EP in 1968, together with three other songs from The Graduate film: "Mrs. Robinson", "Scarborough Fair/Canticle", and "The Sound of Silence".

== Background and composition ==
The song was written in 1964 while Paul Simon was in England, while living in a basement flat in Belsize Park. Its lyrics use the changing nature of the seasons as a metaphor for a girl's changing moods. The inspiration for the song was a girl that Simon met and the nursery rhyme she used to recite, "Cuckoo". James Hardy lists regional variations to this folk rhyme about the Cuckoo - and the one closest to the lyrics is from Hampshire:

In April, come I will
In May, I prepare to stay
In June, I change my tune [the call changes in June]
In July, I prepare to fly
In August, go I must [Cuckoos migrate to Africa]

It is the shortest song on the album. The song is composed in the key of G major, sounding as A major with the capo on the 2nd fret, with Art Garfunkel's vocal range spanning from D_{3} to D_{4}.

== Release and reception ==
In the February 1968 release of the soundtrack for the movie The Graduate, the song appeared (in a different version) as the seventh track. It is featured in a pool scene in the movie and was used as a rhythmic guide for the editing of the film.

Reviews for the song were generally positive. Matthew Greenwald of AllMusic wrote: "The sense of yearning in this song would later be beautifully echoed in one of the Parsley, Sage, Rosemary & Thyme masterpieces, "For Emily, Wherever I May Find Her". [sic] Like that song, it is very brief, yet the shortness of the song adds to the effectiveness and economy of both the lyric and melody."

== In popular culture ==
Excerpts feature throughout the Korean drama Angel Eyes. It is the favorite song of the female lead Yoon Soo-wan (Koo Hye-sun) and is the ringtone for the phone of the male lead Park Dong-joo (Lee Sang-yoon) on his return to South Korea. Part of the song was featured in Season 23, Episode 18 of The Simpsons, "Beware My Cheating Bart". Conversely, the musical segment featured a visual gag referencing the poster of the 1967 film, The Graduate, for which Simon & Garfunkel provided the soundtrack. In the 2000s, the song was also featured in an episode of Parks and Recreation and one of The Mindy Project.

== Bibliography ==
- Eliot, Marc (2010). Paul Simon: A Life. John Wiley and Sons. ISBN 978-0-470-43363-8.
