= 7 O'Clock News/Silent Night =

Song by Simon & Garfunkel

from the album Parsley, Sage, Rosemary and Thyme
- Released: October 10, 1966
- Recorded: August 22, 1966
- Genre: Folk; sound collage
- Length: 2:01
- Label: Columbia
- Songwriter(s): Josef Mohr, Franz Gruber
- Producer(s): Bob Johnston

"7 O'Clock News/Silent Night" is a song by American music duo Simon & Garfunkel from their third studio album, Parsley, Sage, Rosemary and Thyme (1966). The track is a sound collage juxtaposing a rendition of the Christmas carol "Silent Night" with a simulated "7 O'Clock News" bulletin consisting of actual events from the summer of 1966.

== Composition ==
The track is a sound collage and simply constructed: it consists of the duo singing "Silent Night" in two-part harmony over an arpeggiated piano section. The voice of the newscaster is that of Charlie O'Donnell, who was then a radio disc jockey. As the track progresses, the news report assumes a greater presence through an increase in volume. "The result rather bluntly makes an ironic commentary on various social ills by juxtaposing them with tenderly expressed Christmas sentiments." The mix on the track purposefully clashes with the piano accompaniment mixed solely to the left channel and the news solely to the right channel while vocals remain in the middle.

The following events are reported in the order given:

- A dispute in the House of Representatives over "the civil rights bill". It is stated that President Johnson had originally proposed a full ban on discrimination for any type of housing — dismissed as "having no chance" — and that "a compromise was painfully worked out in the House Judiciary Committee."
- The death of comedian Lenny Bruce from an overdose of narcotics at the age of 42 [actually 40].
- Martin Luther King Jr. reaffirming plans for an open housing march into Cicero, Illinois, a suburb of Chicago. It is stated that Cook County sheriff Richard Ogilvie urged its cancellation, and that Cicero police plan to ask the National Guard to be called in.
- The grand jury indictment of Richard Speck for the murder of nine [actually eight] student nurses.
- Disruption by protesters at House Committee on Un-American Activities hearings into anti-Vietnam War protests.
- A speech by "former Vice-President Richard Nixon" to the Veterans of Foreign Wars [actually to the American Legion] urging an increase in the war effort in Vietnam, and calling opposition to the war the "greatest single weapon working against the US".

== Cover ==
Phoebe Bridgers released a cover version of this song in 2019. The song featured Bridgers and Fiona Apple singing over a different news report read by Matt Berninger. The news featured the announcement of a settlement that would not force the Sackler family, owners of Purdue Pharma, to admit wrongdoing in the deaths of hundreds of thousands related to their opioid products, the first all female spacewalk, the murder of Botham Jean, the Supreme Court hearing the case of a restrictive abortion law from Louisiana, and the testimony of Mick Mulvaney in the first impeachment trial of Donald Trump.

== Bibliography ==
- Bennighof, James (2007). The Words and Music of Paul Simon. Greenwood Publishing Group. ISBN 978-0-275-99163-0.
- "Songs + Lyrics: 7 O'Clock News/Silent Night". Paul Simon official website.
