= Homeward Bound (Simon & Garfunkel song) =

Single by Simon & Garfunkel

from the album Parsley, Sage, Rosemary and Thyme (US), Sounds of Silence (UK)
- B-side: "Leaves That Are Green"
- Released: January 19, 1966
- Recorded: December 14, 1965
- Genre: Folk rock; jangle pop
- Length: 2:30
- Label: Columbia
- Songwriter: Paul Simon
- Producer: Bob Johnston

Simon & Garfunkel singles chronology
"The Sound of Silence" (1965)	"Homeward Bound" (1966)	"I Am a Rock" (1966)

"Homeward Bound" is a song by the American music duo Simon & Garfunkel, released as a single on January 19, 1966 by Columbia Records. It was written by Paul Simon and produced by Bob Johnston. Simon wrote the song during his time in England, probably while waiting for a train at Widnes railway station, where a plaque commemorates the event.

"Homeward Bound" appears on the duo's third studio album, Parsley, Sage, Rosemary and Thyme (1966), although it was recorded during the sessions for their second album, Sounds of Silence and included on that album in the UK. It was their second single, the follow-up to their breakthrough hit "The Sound of Silence". "Homeward Bound" performed very well domestically, peaking at number five on the Billboard Hot 100, remaining on the charts for 12 weeks. It reached number two in Canada, and was a top-five hit in the Netherlands.

A live version is included on Simon and Garfunkel's Greatest Hits (1972). Simon and Garfunkel performed "Homeward Bound" at their 1981 reunion in Central Park.

== Writing ==
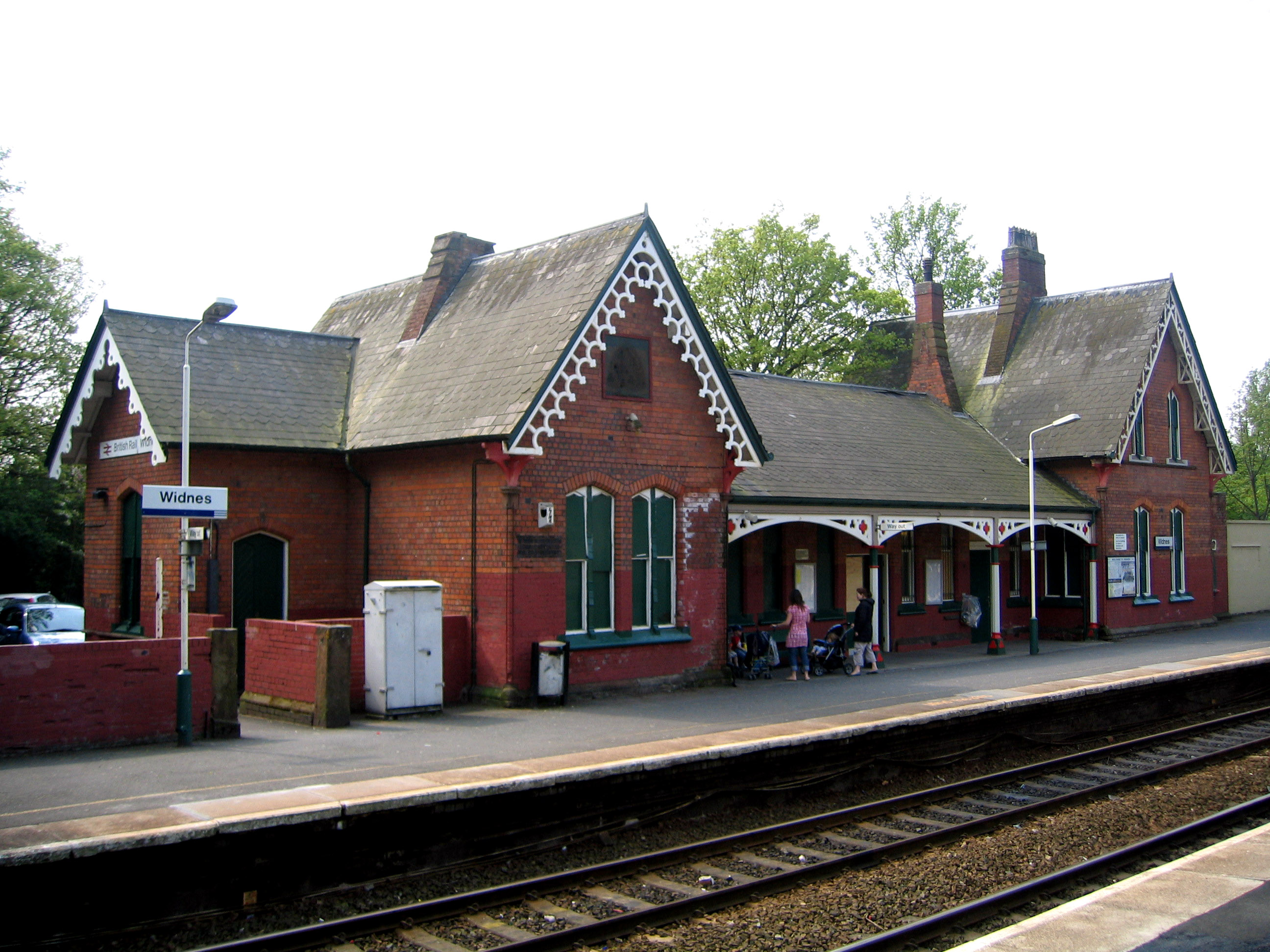
Widnes railway station, England, where Simon wrote "Homeward Bound"

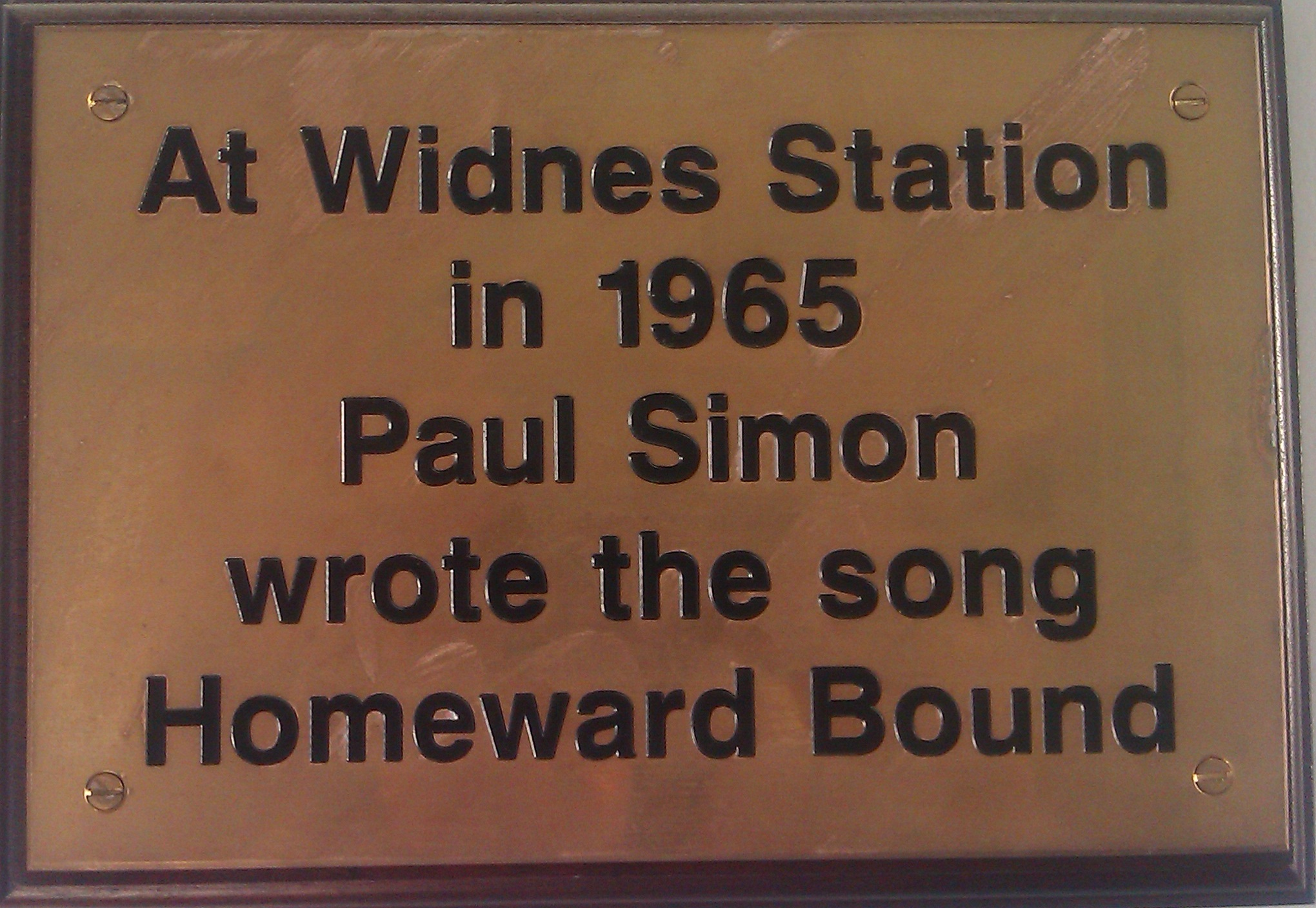
A plaque commemorating the song at Widnes railway station

"Homeward Bound" was written by Simon after he returned to England in early 1964. He had previously spent time in Essex, and he became a nightly fixture at the Railway Hotel in Brentwood, beginning that April. He was reeling from his brief period in the folk scene in Greenwich Village, New York, and the recording of his first album with Art Garfunkel, Wednesday Morning, 3 A.M., which he anticipated would be a failure.

In England, Simon met Kathy Chitty, who was working as a ticket-taker at the club. They quickly became close, but Simon wanted to perform in London. Following a performance in Widnes, Simon was dropped off at Widnes railway station for a train to Manchester, en route to his next performance, in Hull. He had been missing Chitty, and began to write '"Homeward Bound" on a scrap of paper. A plaque commemorating the song is displayed on Widnes station's main platform.

Other locations for the writing of the song have been suggested. In 2016, Simon said that he composed "Homeward Bound" at Widnes or Warrington railway station. Simon's friend Geoff Speed, with whom Simon stayed in September 1965, said he heard Simon writing the song when he was staying at his home. Speed then dropped him at Widnes railway station; he said it was likely that Simon wrote one verse in Liverpool and the chorus in Wigan, and finished the song at the station.

Chitty is mentioned in several other Simon & Garfunkel songs, most notably "Kathy's Song" and "America". In the 1969 song "The Boxer", Simon alludes to a railway station, a possible reference to "Homeward Bound".

== Reception ==
Billboard described "Homeward Bound" as an "interesting off-beat rhythm number". Cash Box described the single as a "catchy, low-down blues-tinged folk-styled ode about a wanderin’ lad who is finally going back to his hometown gal" that "should speedily move up the hitsville path". Record World called it "a haunting, sad song".

== Charts ==
=== Weekly charts ===
Chart (1966)	Peak position
Australia (Kent Music Report)	20
Canadian RPM 100	2
Dutch Singles Chart	4
New Zealand (Listener)	1
Rhodesia Singles Chart	4
South Africa (Springbok Radio)	6
Swedish Singles Chart	12
UK Singles Chart	9
US Billboard Hot 100	5
US Cash Box Top 100	5

=== Year-end charts ===
Chart (1966)	Rank
US Billboard Hot 100	56
US Cash Box	61

== Certifications ==
Region	Certification	Certified units/sales
New Zealand (RMNZ)	Gold	15,000^{‡}
United Kingdom (BPI)	Silver	200,000^{‡}
^{‡} Sales+streaming figures based on certification alone.

== Live performances ==
Simon performed "Homeward Bound" with George Harrison on the November 20, 1976 episode of Saturday Night Live. Both sang some of their solo hits, and also performed "Here Comes the Sun" together. Their duet of "Homeward Bound" appeared on the benefit album Nobody's Child: Romanian Angel Appeal. Simon performed the song again for the 50th anniversary special of Saturday Night Live on February 16, 2025, this time with Sabrina Carpenter.

A video of the duet with Harrison from Saturday Night Live was also included in a DVD release titled Paul Simon and Friends. In May 2007 the Library of Congress invited musicians and artists to perform together in Washington, D.C., to honor Paul Simon who received the first Gershwin Prize for Popular Song. Alison Krauss, Stevie Wonder, Lyle Lovett, Ladysmith Black Mambazo, Marc Anthony, Art Garfunkel and others all performed.

== See also ==
- List of train songs

== Notes ==
=== Sources ===
- Bennighof, James (2007). The Words and Music of Paul Simon. Greenwood Publishing Group. ISBN 978-0-275-99163-0.
- Eliot, Marc (2010). Paul Simon: A Life. John Wiley and Sons. ISBN 978-0-470-43363-8.
- Fornatale, Pete (2007). Simon and Garfunkel's Bookends. Rodale. ISBN 978-1-59486-427-8.
