= The Big Bright Green Pleasure Machine =

Song by Simon & Garfunkel

from the album Parsley, Sage, Rosemary and Thyme
- A-side: "The Dangling Conversation"
- Released: July 1966
- Recorded: December 1965 – August 1966
- Genre: Folk rock
- Length: 2:44
- Label: Columbia
- Songwriter: Paul Simon
- Producer: Bob Johnston

"The Big Bright Green Pleasure Machine" is a 1966 song by Paul Simon released on Simon & Garfunkel's album Parsley, Sage, Rosemary and Thyme, and as a B-side of "The Dangling Conversation", which charted at number 25 on Billboard's Hot 100. It is a commentary on advertising.

== Writing and composition ==
"The Big Bright Green Pleasure Machine" was written by Simon while he was in London apparently watching his clothes in a washing machine. It takes a cynical view of the advertising on Madison Avenue in New York City. The song includes references to the hippie movement during the Vietnam War as well as a series of unanswered personal questions.

The lyrics are "blisteringly satirical" and aimed at various popular culture targets. In the original album notes, Ralph J. Gleason said this song and "The Dangling Conversation" were criticisms of television and radio commercials. The notes for The Columbia Studio Recordings (1964–1970), a 2001 release of Parsley, Sage, Rosemary and Thyme and four other albums, called the track "Simon's caricature of consumer culture".

== Release ==
"The Big Bright Green Pleasure Machine" was released as the B-side of "The Dangling Conversation" in July 1966, reaching number 25 on Billboard's Hot 100. It was the fifth track on Parsley, Sage, Rosemary and Thyme, which was released on October 24, 1966 and peaked at number four on the Billboard 200. The song also appeared (in a different version) on the January 1968 release of the soundtrack for the movie The Graduate.

== Reception ==
"The Big Bright Green Pleasure Machine" received generally positive reviews. Cash Box said that it is a "rollicking, blues-soaked danceable rocker".

== Legacy ==
In a retrospective review for AllMusic Matthew Greenwald compares it to Marty Balin's "Plastic Fantastic Lover" (recorded by Jefferson Airplane on their 1967 album Surrealistic Pillow). Greenwald calls it "a great putdown song about the effect of television" that "succeeds precisely because the overall sound of the record conveys the over-saturation and ridiculous nature of the medium". In Bruce Eder's review for AllMusic, he defines the song as a "sneering rock & roll-based social commentary". Andy Fyfe of BBC Music said in his review of Parsley, Sage, Rosemary and Thyme that the song "may seem slight on the surface, but their joy at merely being alive reflected the optimism of youth in a time of crisis", referring to the Vietnam War.
