= The Dangling Conversation =

- US picture sleeve

Single by Simon and Garfunkel

from the album Parsley, Sage, Rosemary and Thyme
- B-side: "The Big Bright Green Pleasure Machine"
- Released: July 18, 1966
- Recorded: June 21, 1966
- Genre: Folk rock
- Length: 2:37
- Label: Columbia Records
- Songwriter: Paul Simon
- Producer: Bob Johnston

Simon and Garfunkel singles chronology
"I Am a Rock" (1966)	"The Dangling Conversation" (1966)	"A Hazy Shade of Winter" (1966)

"The Dangling Conversation" is a song by American music duo Simon & Garfunkel, released in September 1966 as the second single from the duo's third studio album, Parsley, Sage, Rosemary and Thyme (1966).

== Background ==
Simon & Garfunkel's opinion of the song varied over time. According to biographer Peter Ames Carlin, they both considered it their favorite song on the album at the time of its release. Marc Eliot, who wrote Paul Simon: A Life, disputes this, arguing that Garfunkel always disliked the song and felt it was pretentious. When the single did not perform as well as they had hoped, Simon told Record Mirror's Norman Jopling that the song was "above the kids". In 1993, when asked about the song, he commented, "It's a college kid's song, a little precious."

== Reception ==
Cash Box said that it is a "gentle pop-folk ode which underscores some of life’s everyday hypocrisies" and expected it to "become a smash". Record World said that "the pretty tune with vivid lyrics of aloneness will catch."

== Commercial performance ==
The song peaked at number 25 on the Billboard Hot 100, and never made it onto the UK charts. Simon viewed "The Dangling Conversation" as an "absolutely amazing" disappointment to him at the time, as the previous three Simon & Garfunkel singles were reasonable "hits". He felt as though the song may have been "too heavy" for a mainstream audience.

== Charts ==
Chart (1966)	Peak position
Canada 100 (RPM)	27
US Billboard Hot 100	25
US Cashbox Top 100	15

== In popular culture ==
The song features in Frederick Wiseman's 1968 documentary film High School in which a young teacher plays it, and enthusiastically advocates for its artistic qualities, while her class listens and looks rather bored. (As with all of Wiseman's work, the filmmaker's possible satirical intent always remains ambiguous.)

== Cover ==
Joan Baez' album Joan in 1967. She changed the line "Is the theatre really dead?" to "Is the church really dead?".

== Sources ==
- Carlin, Peter Ames (2016). Homeward Bound: The Life of Paul Simon. Henry Holt and Co. ISBN 978-1-627-79034-5.
- Eliot, Marc (2010). Paul Simon: A Life. John Wiley and Sons. ISBN 978-0-470-43363-8.
