= Patterns (Paul Simon song) =

Song by Paul Simon

from the album The Paul Simon Songbook
- Released: August 1965
- Recorded: June – July 1965
- Label: CBS
- Songwriter(s): Paul Simon
- Producer(s): Reginald Warburghton, Stanley West

"Patterns"

Song by Simon and Garfunkel

from the album Parsley, Sage, Rosemary and Thyme
- Released: September 1966
- Genre: Folk rock, psychedelic folk, worldbeat
- Length: 2:45
- Label: Columbia Records
- Songwriter(s): Paul Simon
- Producer(s): Bob Johnston

"Patterns" is a song written by Paul Simon and included on his 1965 album The Paul Simon Songbook, and later recorded by Simon and Garfunkel on their third album, Parsley, Sage, Rosemary and Thyme. The lyrics are about how life is a labyrinthine maze, following patterns which are, because we are trapped in them, difficult to unravel or control.

Warrel Dane included a heavy metal cover of the song on his 2008 album Praises to the War Machine.
