= The Sound of Silence =

1964 song recorded by Simon & Garfunkel

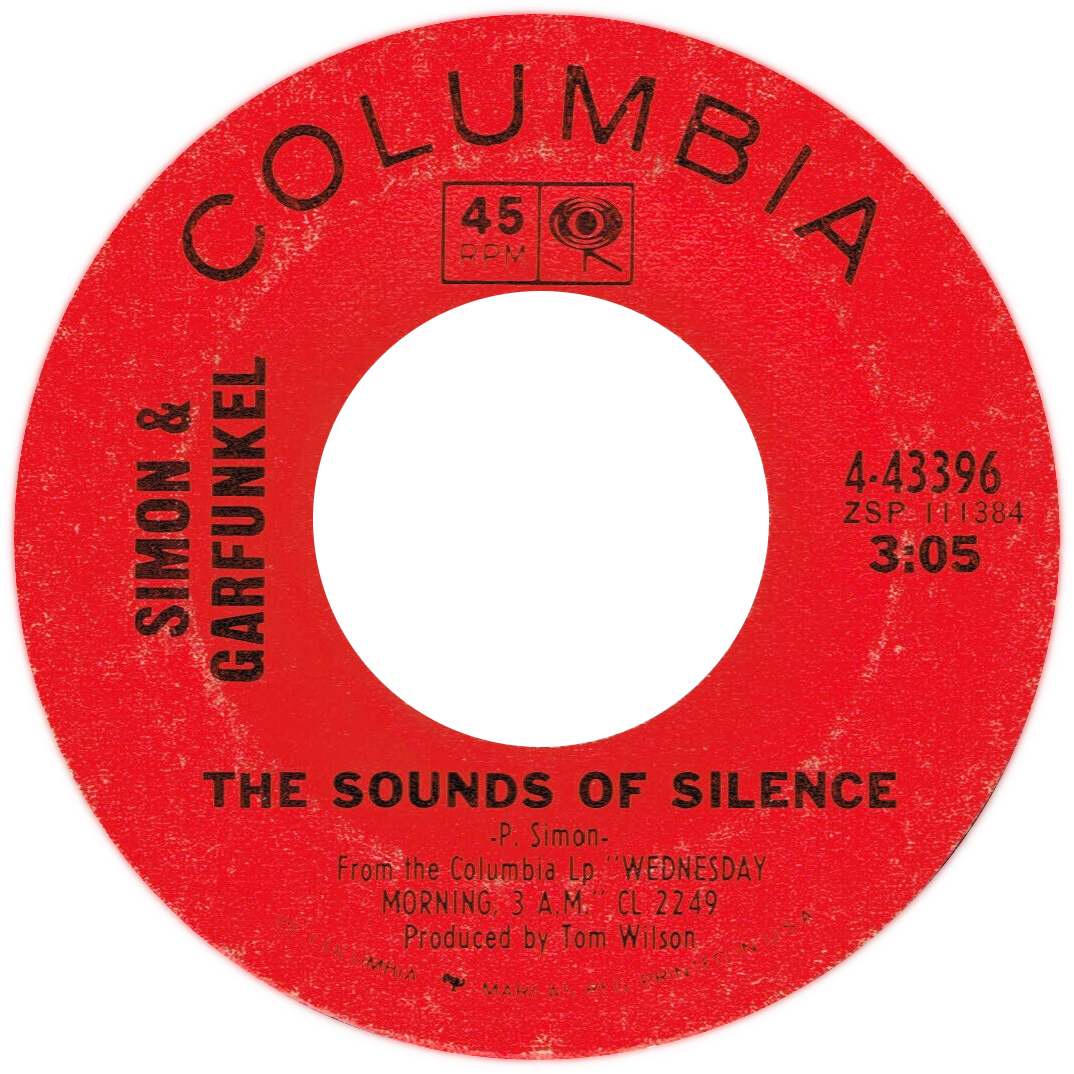
- Side A of the 1965 US vinyl single

Single by Simon & Garfunkel

from the album Wednesday Morning, 3 A.M. and Sounds of Silence
- B-side: "We've Got a Groovy Thing Goin'"
- Released: October 19, 1964 (original acoustic version) September 12, 1965 (overdubbed electric version)
- Recorded: March 10, 1964
- Studio: Columbia 7th Ave, New York City
- Genre: Folk rock
- Length: 3:05
- Label: Columbia
- Songwriter: Paul Simon
- Producer: Tom Wilson

Simon & Garfunkel singles chronology
"The Sound of Silence" (1964)	"Homeward Bound" (1966)

Audio
- "The Sound of Silence" on YouTube

"The Sound of Silence" (originally titled "The Sounds of Silence") is a song by the American folk rock duo Simon & Garfunkel, written by Paul Simon. The duo's studio audition of the song led to a record deal with Columbia Records, and the original acoustic version was recorded in March 1964 at Columbia's 7th Avenue Recording Studios in New York City for their debut album, Wednesday Morning, 3 A.M., released that October to disappointing sales. An overdubbed electric remix was released the following year and went to number one on the Billboard singles chart.

In 1965, the song began to attract airplay at radio stations in Boston and throughout Florida. The growing airplay led Tom Wilson, the song's producer, to remix the track, overdubbing electric instruments and drums. This remixed version was released as a single in September 1965. Simon & Garfunkel were not informed of the song's remix until after its release. The remix hit No. 1 on the Billboard Hot 100 for the week ending January 1, 1966, leading the duo to reunite and hastily record their second album, which Columbia titled Sounds of Silence in an attempt to capitalize on the song's success. The remixed single version of the song was included on this follow-up album. Later, it was featured under both the opening and closing credits of the 1967 film The Graduate and was included on the film's soundtrack album. It was additionally released on the Mrs. Robinson EP in 1968, along with three other songs from the film: "Mrs. Robinson", "April Come She Will", and "Scarborough Fair/Canticle".

"The Sound of Silence" was a top-ten hit in multiple countries worldwide, among them Australia, Austria, West Germany, Japan and the Netherlands. Since its release, the song was included in later compilations, beginning with the 1972 compilation album Simon and Garfunkel's Greatest Hits.

== Background ==
=== Origin and original recording ===
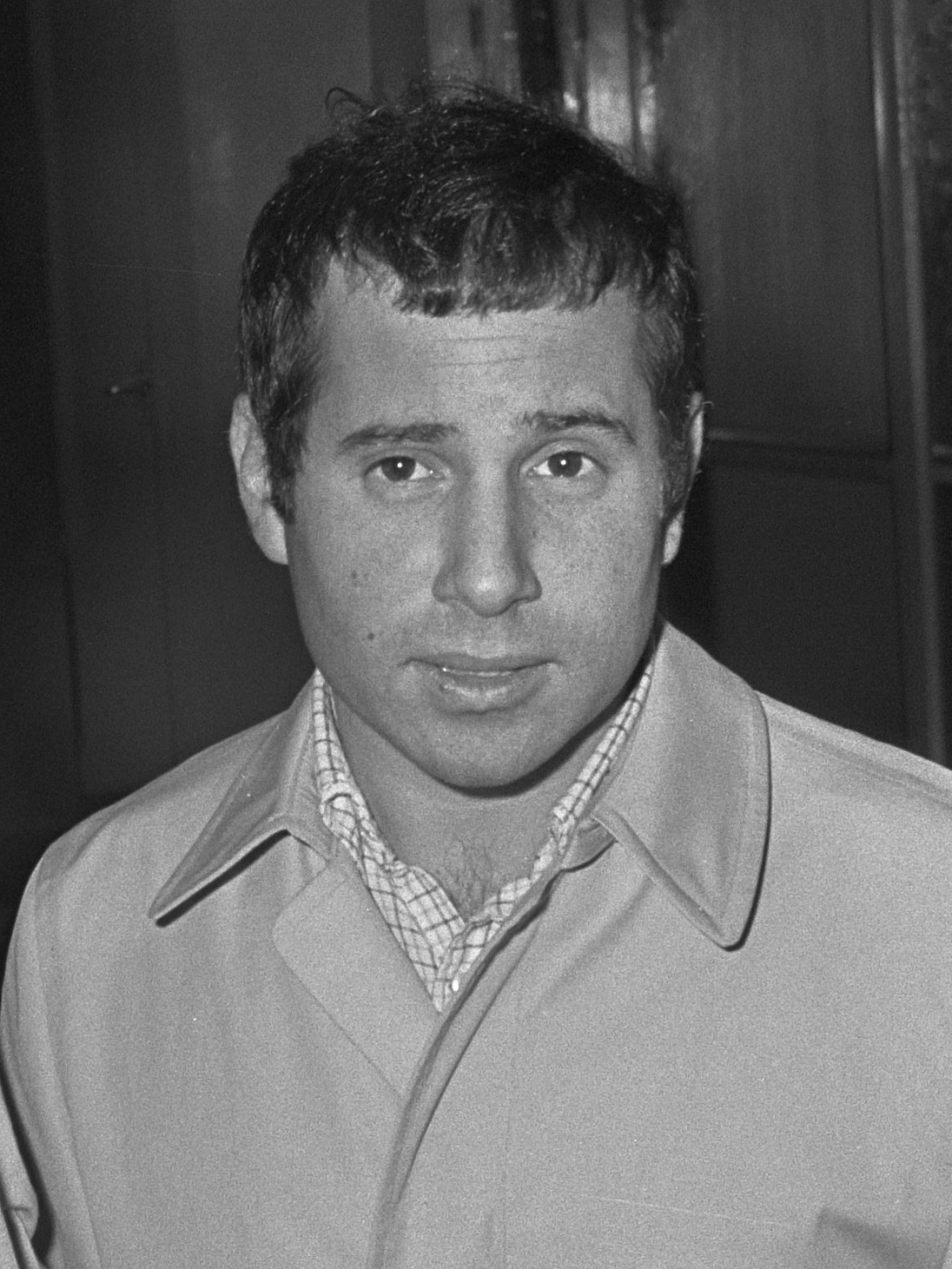
Paul Simon, the song's composer, c. 1966

Simon and Garfunkel had become interested in folk music and the growing counterculture movement separately in the early 1960s. Having performed together previously under the name Tom and Jerry in the late 1950s, their partnership had dissolved by the time they began attending college. In 1963, they regrouped and began performing Simon's original compositions locally in Queens. They billed themselves "Kane & Garr", after old recording pseudonyms, and signed up for Gerde's Folk City, a Greenwich Village club that hosted Monday night performances. In September 1963, the duo's performances caught the attention of Columbia Records producer Tom Wilson, a young African-American jazz musician who was also helping to guide Bob Dylan's transition from folk to rock. Simon convinced Wilson to let him and his partner have a studio audition; their performance of "The Sound of Silence" got the duo signed to Columbia.

The song's origin and basis are unclear, with some thinking that the song commented on the assassination of John F. Kennedy, as the song was recorded three months after the assassination, although Simon & Garfunkel had performed the song live as Kane & Garr two months before the assassination. Simon wrote "The Sound of Silence" when he was 21 years old, later explaining that the song was written in his bathroom, where he turned off the lights to better concentrate. "The main thing about playing the guitar, though, was that I was able to sit by myself and play and dream. And I was always happy doing that. I used to go off in the bathroom, because the bathroom had tiles, so it was a slight echo chamber. I'd turn on the faucet so that water would run (I like that sound, it's very soothing to me) and I'd play. In the dark. 'Hello darkness, my old friend / I've come to talk with you again.'" According to Garfunkel, the song was first developed in November 1963, but Simon took three months to perfect the lyrics, which were entirely written on February 19, 1964. Garfunkel, introducing the song at a live performance (with Simon) in Haarlem (Netherlands), in June 1966, summed up the song's meaning as "the inability of people to communicate with each other, and not particularly internationally but especially emotionally, so that what you see around you is people who are unable to love each other."

Garfunkel's college roommate, Sandy Greenberg, wrote in his memoir that the song reflected the strong bond of friendship between Simon and Garfunkel, who had adopted the epithet "Darkness" to empathise with Greenberg's sudden-onset blindness.

To promote the release of their debut album, Wednesday Morning, 3 A.M., released on October 19, 1964, the duo performed again at Folk City, as well as two shows at the Gaslight Café, which went over poorly. Dave Van Ronk, a folk singer, was at the performances, and noted that several in the audience regarded their music as a joke. "'Sounds of Silence' actually became a running joke: for a while there, it was only necessary to start singing 'Hello darkness, my old friend ... ' and everybody would crack up." Wednesday Morning, 3 AM sold only 3,000 copies upon its October release, and its dismal sales led Simon to move to London. While there, he recorded a solo album, The Paul Simon Songbook (1965), which features a rendition of the song, titled "The Sound of Silence" (instead of "The Sounds of Silence", as on Wednesday Morning, 3 A.M.).

The original recording of the song is in D♯ minor, using the chords D♯m, C♯, B and F♯. Simon plays a guitar with a capo on the sixth fret, using the shapes for Am, G, F and C chords. He provides the lower vocals for harmony while Garfunkel sings the melody. The vocal span goes from C♯3 to F♯4 in the song.

=== Remix ===
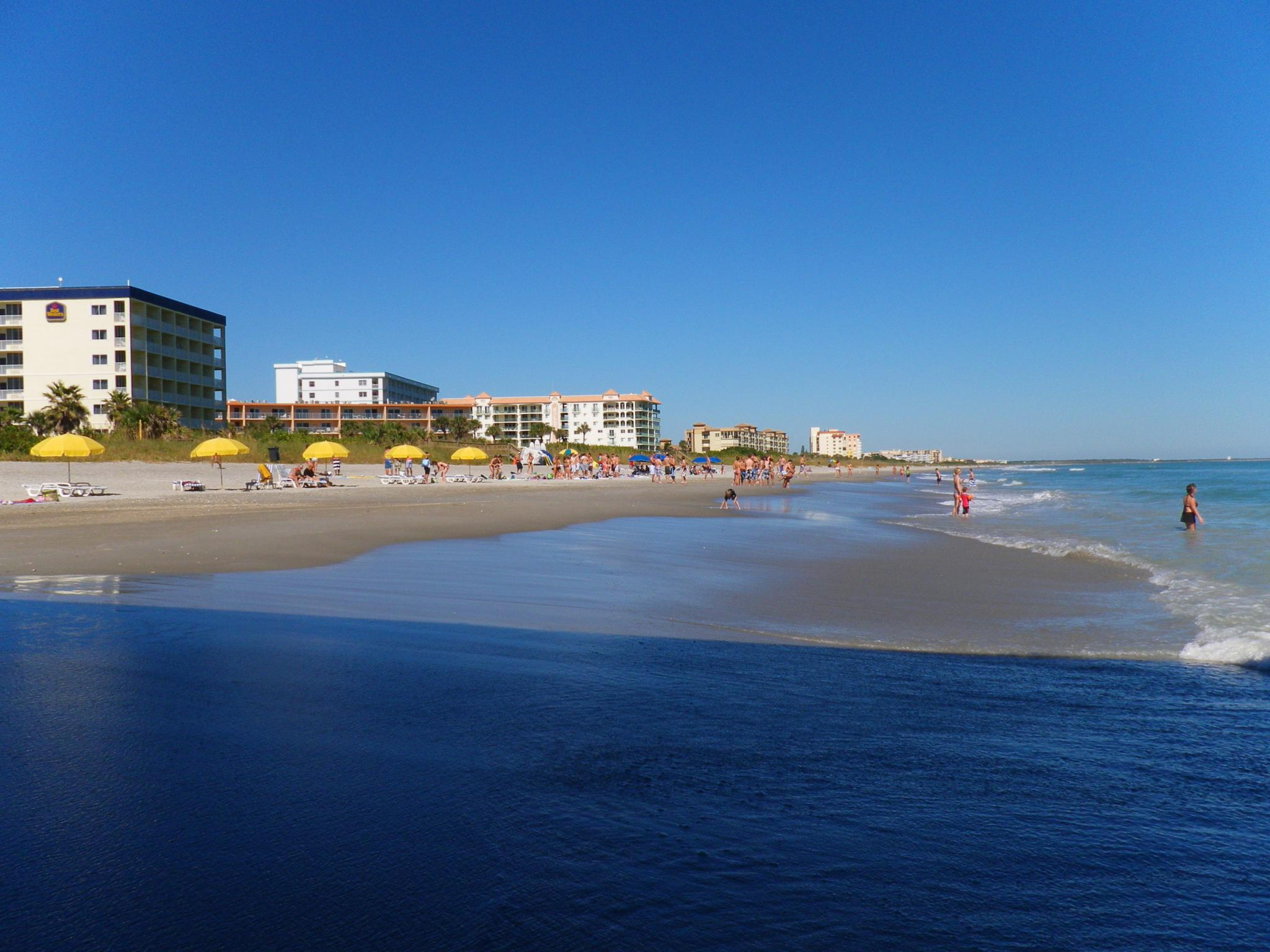
The song's heavy airplay in Cocoa Beach, Florida, alerted Columbia to release the single.

Wednesday Morning, 3 A.M. had been a commercial failure before producer Tom Wilson was alerted that radio stations had begun to play "The Sound of Silence" in spring 1965. A late-night disc jockey at WBZ in Boston began to spin "The Sound of Silence", where it found a college student audience. Those at Harvard and Tufts University responded well, and the song made its way down the east coast pretty much "overnight", "all the way to Cocoa Beach, Florida, where it caught the students coming down for spring break." A promotional executive for Columbia went to give away free albums of new artists, and beach-goers were interested only in the artists behind "The Sound of Silence". He phoned the home office in New York, alerting them of its appeal. An alternate version of the story states that Wilson attended Columbia's July 1965 convention in Miami, where the head of the local sales branch raved about the song's airplay.

Folk rock was beginning to make waves on pop radio, with songs such as the Byrds' "Mr. Tambourine Man" charting high. Wilson listened to the song several times, thinking it too soft for a wide release. He had strong feelings about editing the song with explicit rock overtones. As stated by Geoffrey Himes, "If Columbia Records producer Tom Wilson hadn't taken the initiative, without the singers' knowledge, to dub a rock rhythm section over their folk rendition, the song never would have become a cultural touchstone—a generation's shorthand for alienation." Wilson had also experimented the previous December with overdubbing an electric band over acoustic tracks by Bob Dylan; these recordings were never officially released, as Dylan and Wilson opted to record new tracks with a live band for what would become the album Bringing It All Back Home.

On June 15, 1965, following sessions for Dylan's "Like a Rolling Stone", Wilson retained guitarist Al Gorgoni and drummer Bobby Gregg from the Dylan sessions, adding guitarist Vinnie Bell and bassist Bob Bushnell. The tempo on the original recording was uneven, making it difficult for the musicians to keep the song in time. Engineer Roy Halee employed a heavy echo on the remix, which was a common trait of the Byrds' hits. The single was first provided to college FM rock stations, and a commercial single release followed on September 13, 1965. The lack of consultation with Simon and Garfunkel on the remix was because, although the duo was still contracted to Columbia Records, the duo was no longer a "working entity". It was not unusual for producers to add instruments or vocals to previous releases and re-release them as new products.

In the fall of 1965, Simon was in Denmark, performing at small clubs, and picked up a copy of Billboard, as he had routinely done for several years. Upon seeing "The Sound of Silence" in the Billboard Hot 100, he bought a copy of Cashbox and saw the same thing. Several days later, Garfunkel excitedly called Simon to inform him of the single's growing success. A copy of the 7-inch single arrived in the mail the next day, and according to friend Al Stewart, "Paul was horrified when he first heard it ... [when the] rhythm section slowed down at one point so that Paul and Artie's voices could catch up." Garfunkel was far less concerned about the remix, feeling conditioned to the process of trying to create a hit single: "It's interesting, I suppose it might do something, It might sell," he told Wilson.

== Lyrics ==
The lyrics of the song are written in five stanzas of seven lines each. Each stanza begins with a couplet describing the setting of the scene, followed by a couplet driving the action forward and another couplet expressing the climactic thought of the verse, and closes with a one-line refrain referring to "the sound of silence". The progress of the lyrics through its five stanzas places the singer into an incrementally increasing tension with an increasingly ambiguous "sound of silence". The irony of using the word "sound" to describe silence in the title lyrics suggests a paradoxical symbolism being used by the singer, which the lyrics of the fourth stanza eventually identifies as "silence like a cancer grows". The "sound of silence" is symbolically taken also to denote the cultural alienation associated with much of the 1960s.

The first stanza presents the singer as taking some relative solace in the peacefulness he associates with "darkness" which is submerged "within" the ambiguous sound of silence. The second stanza has the effect of breaking into the silence with "the flash of a neon light" which leaves the singer "touched" by the enduring ambiguity of the sound of silence. In the third stanza, a "naked light" emerges as a vision of 10,000 people all caught within their own solitude and alienation without any one of them daring to "disturb" the recurring sound of silence.

In the fourth stanza, the singer proclaims in a declarative voice that "silence like a cancer grows," though his words "like silent raindrops fell" without ever being heard against the by now cancerous sound of silence. The fifth stanza appears to culminate with the urgency raised by the declarative voice in the fourth stanza through the apparent triumph of a false "neon god". The false neon god is only challenged when a "sign flashed out its warning" that only the words of the indigent written on "subway walls and tenement halls" could still "whisper" their truth against the recurring and ambiguous form of "the sound of silence".

The song has no lyrical bridge or change of key, and was written without any lyrical intro or outro.

== Personnel ==
- Paul Simon – acoustic guitar, vocals
- Art Garfunkel – vocals
- Barry Kornfeld – acoustic guitar
- Bill Lee – double bass

(electric overdubs) personnel

- Al Gorgoni, Vinnie Bell – guitar
- Bob Bushnell – bass guitar
- Bobby Gregg – drums

== Charts performance ==
=== Charts history ===
"The Sound of Silence" first broke in Boston, where it became one of the top-selling singles in early November 1965; it spread to Miami and Washington, D.C. two weeks later, reaching number one in Boston and debuting on the Billboard Hot 100.

Throughout the month of January 1966 "The Sound of Silence" had a one-on-one battle with the Beatles' "We Can Work It Out" for the number one spot on the Billboard Hot 100. "The Sound of Silence" was number one for the weeks of January 1 and 22 and number two for the intervening two weeks. "We Can Work It Out" held the top spot for the weeks of January 8, 15, and 29, and it was number two for the two weeks that "The Sound of Silence" was number one. Overall, "The Sound of Silence" spent 14 weeks on the Billboard chart.

In the wake of the song's success, Simon promptly returned to the United States to record a new Simon & Garfunkel album at Columbia's request. He later described his experiences learning the song went to number one, a story he repeated in numerous interviews:

I had come back to New York, and I was staying in my old room at my parents' house. Artie was living at his parents' house, too. I remember Artie and I were sitting there in my car one night, parked on a street in Queens, and the announcer [on the radio] said, "Number one, Simon & Garfunkel." And Artie said to me, "That Simon & Garfunkel, they must be having a great time." Because there we were on a street corner [in my car in] Queens, smoking a joint. We didn't know what to do with ourselves.

For his part, Garfunkel had a different memory of the song's success:

We were in L.A. Our manager called us at the hotel we were staying at. We were both in the same room. We must have bunked in the same room in those days. I picked up the phone. He said, "Well, congratulations. Next week you will go from five to one in Billboard." It was fun. I remember pulling open the curtains and letting the brilliant sun come into this very red room, and then ordering room service. That was good.

A cover by Peaches & Herb reached #88 in Canada, July 24, 1971.

=== Weekly charts ===
Chart (1965–68)	Peak position
Australia (Kent Music Report)	3
Austria (Ö3 Austria Top 40)	3
Belgium (Ultratop 50 Flanders)	11
Belgium (Ultratop 50 Wallonia)	37
Canada Top Singles (RPM)	4
Germany (GfK)	9
Japan (Oricon)	1
Netherlands (Dutch Top 40)	10
Netherlands (Single Top 100)	11
New Zealand (Recorded Music NZ)	2
South Africa (Springbok Radio)	1
Spain Singles Chart	17
Switzerland (Schweizer Hitparade)	94
US Billboard Hot 100	1
US Cash Box Top 100	1
Zimbabwe Singles Chart	3

Chart (2016)	Peak position
US Hot Rock & Alternative Songs (Billboard)	6

Paul Simon solo version

Chart (1974)	Peak position
Canada Adult Contemporary (RPM)	42
Canada Top Singles (RPM)	84
US Billboard Easy Listening	50
US Cash Box Top 100	97

=== Year-end charts ===
Chart (1966)	Position
South Africa	10
US Billboard Hot 100	54
US Cash Box Top 100	2

Chart (2016)	Position
US Hot Rock Songs (Billboard)	100

=== Certifications ===
Region	Certification	Certified units/sales
Canada (Music Canada)	Gold	75,000^{^}
Denmark (IFPI Danmark)	Platinum	90,000^{‡}
Germany (BVMI)	Gold	250,000^{‡}
New Zealand (RMNZ)	2× Platinum	60,000^{‡}
Spain (Promusicae)	Platinum	60,000^{‡}
United Kingdom (BPI)	Platinum	600,000^{‡}
United States (RIAA)	Gold	1,000,000^{^}
^{^} Shipments figures based on certification alone.^{‡} Sales+streaming figures based on certification alone.

== The Bachelors version ==
A cover version by the Irish group The Bachelors was released in March 1966, peaking at number three in the UK and number nine in Ireland.

=== Chart performance ===
Chart (1966)	Peak position
Ireland (IRMA)	9
UK Singles (Official Charts)	3

== Disturbed version ==
"The Sound of Silence"

Single by Disturbed

from the album Immortalized
- Released: December 7, 2015
- Recorded: 2015
- Studio: The Hideout Recording Studio; Las Vegas, Nevada
- Genre: Symphonic rock
- Length: 4:08
- Label: Reprise
- Songwriter: Paul Simon
- Producer: Kevin Churko

Disturbed singles chronology
"The Light" (2015)	"The Sound of Silence" (2015)	"Open Your Eyes" (2016)

Music video
- "The Sound of Silence" on YouTube

DJ Cyril remix cover

51 years after its original release, a cover version of "The Sound of Silence" was released by American heavy metal band Disturbed on December 7, 2015. A music video was also released. Their cover hit number one on the Billboard Hard Rock Digital Songs and Mainstream Rock charts, and is their highest-charting song on the Hot 100, peaking at number 42. It is also their highest-charting single in Australia, peaking at number four. David Draiman sings it in the key of F♯m. His vocal span goes from F#2 to A4 in scientific pitch notation.

In April 2016, Paul Simon endorsed the cover. Additionally, on April 1, Simon sent Draiman an email praising Disturbed's performance of the rendition on American talk show Conan. Simon wrote, "Really powerful performance on Conan the other day. First time I'd seen you do it live. Nice." "Thanks." Draiman responded, "Mr. Simon, I am honored beyond words. We only hoped to pay homage and honor to the brilliance of one of the greatest songwriters of all time. Your compliment means the world to me/us and we are eternally grateful." As of September 2017, the single had sold over 1.5 million digital downloads and had been streamed over 54 million times, estimated Nielsen Music. As of September 2024, the music video has over 1 billion views on YouTube, while the live performance on Conan has over 166 million, making it the most watched YouTube video from the show.

In 2024, the Australian DJ Cyril released a remix of Disturbed's version called The Sound of Silence (Cyril Remix).

=== Accolades ===
Region	Year	Publication	Accolade	Rank
United States	2015	Loudwire	20 Best Rock Songs of 2016	1
United States	2015	Loudwire	10 Best Rock Videos of 2016	2

=== Weekly charts ===
Weekly chart performance for "The Sound of Silence"
Chart (2015–2024)	Peak position
Australia (ARIA)	4
Austria (Ö3 Austria Top 40)	1
Belarus Airplay (TopHit)	32
Belgium (Ultratop 50 Flanders)	23
Bulgaria Airplay (PROPHON)	7
Canada Hot 100 (Billboard)	40
CIS Airplay (TopHit)	37
Estonia Airplay (TopHit)	14
Finland (Suomen virallinen lista)	40
Germany (GfK)	2
Germany (Airplay Chart)	28
Ireland (IRMA)	31
Lithuania Airplay (TopHit)	127
Luxembourg Digital Song Sales (Billboard)	1
Mexico Ingles Airplay (Billboard)	16
Morocco (Hit Radio)	2
New Zealand (Recorded Music NZ)	32
Poland Airplay (ZPAV)	67
Portugal (AFP)	44
Portugal Digital Songs (Billboard)	1
Romania Airplay (Media Forest)	1
Romania TV Airplay (Media Forest)	2
Russia Airplay (TopHit)	103
Scottish Singles Sales (Official Charts)	8
Slovenia (SloTop50)	22
Sweden (Sverigetopplistan)	17
Switzerland (Schweizer Hitparade)	12
Turkey International Airplay (Radiomonitor Türkiye)	2
Ukraine Airplay (TopHit)	13
UK Singles (Official Charts)	29
UK Rock & Metal (OCC)	1
US Billboard Hot 100	42
US Hot Rock & Alternative Songs (Billboard)	3
US Rock & Alternative Airplay (Billboard)	8

=== Monthly charts ===
Monthly chart performance for "The Sound of Silence" by Disturbed
Chart (2024)	Peak position
Belarus Airplay (TopHit)	42
CIS Airplay (TopHit)	47
Estonia Airplay (TopHit)	22
Romania Airplay (TopHit)	36
Ukraine Airplay (TopHit)	16

=== Year-end charts ===
Year-end chart performance for "The Sound of Silence"
Chart (2016)	Position
Australia (ARIA)	44
Austria (Ö3 Austria Top 40)	3
Germany (GfK)	14
Sweden (Sverigetopplistan)	100
US Digital Song Sales (Billboard)	33
US Hot Rock & Alternative Songs (Billboard)	9
US Rock Airplay (Billboard)	23

Chart (2024)	Peak position
Belarus Airplay (TopHit)	105
CIS Airplay (TopHit)	108
Denmark (Tracklisten)	51
Estonia Airplay (TopHit)	35

=== Decade-end charts ===
Chart (2010–2019)	Position
Germany (Official German Charts)	50
US Hot Rock Songs (Billboard)	49

=== Weekly charts (remix) ===
Weekly chart performance for "The Sound of Silence" (Cyril Remix) by Disturbed
Chart (2024)	Peak position
Austria (Ö3 Austria Top 40)	35
Belarus Airplay (TopHit)	14
Belgium (Ultratop 50 Wallonia)	18
CIS Airplay (TopHit)	6
Croatia International Airplay (Top lista)	39
Czech Republic Airplay (ČNS IFPI)	20
Czech Republic Singles Digital (ČNS IFPI)	5
Denmark (Tracklisten)	34
Estonia Airplay (TopHit)	9
Finland Airplay (Radiosoittolista)	27
France (SNEP)	3
Global 200 (Billboard)	93
Greece International (IFPI)	71
Hungary (Dance Top 40)	1
Hungary (Rádiós Top 40)	1
Hungary (Single Top 40)	3
Kazakhstan Airplay (TopHit)	4
Latvia Airplay (LaIPA)	17
Lithuania (AGATA)	30
Lithuania Airplay (TopHit)	30
Luxembourg (Billboard)	10
Moldova Airplay (TopHit)	91
Netherlands (Dutch Top 40)	2
Netherlands (Single Top 100)	12
New Zealand Hot Singles (Recorded Music NZ)	23
Norway (VG-lista)	12
Poland (Polish Airplay Top 100)	1
Poland (Polish Streaming Top 100)	7
Portugal (AFP)	50
Romania Airplay (UPFR)	3
Russia Airplay (TopHit)	12
Slovakia Airplay (ČNS IFPI)	2
Slovakia Singles Digital (ČNS IFPI)	3
South Korea BGM (Circle)	187
Switzerland (Schweizer Hitparade)	7
Ukraine Airplay (TopHit)	5
UK Singles (Official Charts) Counted for the original Disturbed version	47
US Hot Dance/Electronic Songs (Billboard)	19

=== Monthly charts (remix) ===
Monthly chart performance for "The Sound of Silence" (Cyril Remix) by Disturbed
Chart (2024)	Peak position
Belarus Airplay (TopHit)	15
CIS Airplay (TopHit)	7
Czech Republic (Rádio Top 100)	21
Czech Republic (Singles Digitál Top 100)	5
Estonia Airplay (TopHit)	14
Kazakhstan Airplay (TopHit)	4
Lithuania Airplay (TopHit)	32
Moldova Airplay (TopHit)	99
Romania Airplay (TopHit)	3
Russia Airplay (TopHit)	14
Slovakia (Rádio Top 100)	6
Slovakia (Singles Digitál Top 100)	4
Ukraine Airplay (TopHit)	6

=== Year-end charts (remix) ===
2024 year-end chart performance for "The Sound of Silence" (Cyril Remix) by Disturbed
Chart (2024)	Position
Austria (Ö3 Austria Top 40)	71
Belarus Airplay (TopHit)	44
Belgium (Ultratop 50 Flanders)	98
Belgium (Ultratop 50 Wallonia)	45
CIS Airplay (TopHit)	9
Estonia Airplay (TopHit)	28
France (SNEP)	9
Germany (GfK)	58
Global 200 (Billboard)	172
Hungary (Dance Top 40)	5
Hungary (Rádiós Top 40)	2
Hungary (Single Top 40)	22
Kazakhstan Airplay (TopHit)	8
Netherlands (Dutch Top 40)	6
Netherlands (Single Top 100)	35
Poland (Polish Airplay Top 100)	7
Poland (Polish Streaming Top 100)	10
Portugal (AFP)	120
Romania Airplay (TopHit)	6
Russia Airplay (TopHit)	20
Sweden (Sverigetopplistan)	21
Switzerland (Schweizer Hitparade)	9
UK Singles (OCC) Counted for the original Disturbed version	95
US Hot Dance/Electronic Songs (Billboard)	59

2025 year-end chart performance for "The Sound of Silence" (Cyril Remix) by Disturbed
Chart (2025)	Position
Belarus Airplay (TopHit)	139
Belgium (Ultratop 50 Flanders)	199
Belgium (Ultratop 50 Wallonia)	157
CIS Airplay (TopHit)	81
France (SNEP)	91
Hungary (Dance Top 40)	5
Hungary (Rádiós Top 40)	8
Poland (Polish Streaming Top 100)	79
Romania Airplay (TopHit)	109
Sweden (Sverigetopplistan)	44
Switzerland (Schweizer Hitparade)	51

=== Certifications ===
Certifications for "The Sound of Silence" by Disturbed
Region	Certification	Certified units/sales
Australia (ARIA)	8× Platinum	560,000^{‡}
Austria (IFPI Austria)	Platinum	30,000^{‡}
Canada (Music Canada)	Diamond	800,000^{‡}
Denmark (IFPI Danmark)	3× Platinum	270,000^{‡}
Germany (BVMI)	Diamond	1,000,000^{‡}
Italy (FIMI)	Platinum	50,000^{‡}
New Zealand (RMNZ)	7× Platinum	210,000^{‡}
Norway (IFPI Norway)	2× Platinum	120,000^{‡}
Poland (ZPAV)	2× Diamond	500,000^{‡}
Spain (Promusicae)	Gold	30,000^{‡}
Sweden (GLF)	2× Platinum	80,000^{‡}
Switzerland (IFPI Switzerland)	Gold	15,000^{‡}
United Kingdom (BPI)	3× Platinum	1,800,000^{‡}
United States (RIAA)	9× Platinum	9,000,000^{‡}
^{‡} Sales+streaming figures based on certification alone.

Certifications for "The Sound of Silence" (Cyril Remix) by Disturbed
Region	Certification	Certified units/sales
Australia (ARIA)	2× Platinum	140,000^{‡}
Belgium (BRMA)	Platinum	40,000^{‡}
Canada (Music Canada)	2× Platinum	160,000^{‡}
Denmark (IFPI Danmark)	2× Platinum	180,000^{‡}
Germany (BVMI)	Gold	300,000^{‡}
New Zealand (RMNZ)	Gold	15,000^{‡}
Portugal (AFP)	Gold	5,000^{‡}
Spain (Promusicae)	Platinum	60,000^{‡}
Switzerland (IFPI Switzerland)	Platinum	30,000^{‡}
^{‡} Sales+streaming figures based on certification alone.

== Paul Simon solo versions ==
"The Sound of Silence"

Single by Paul Simon

from the album Paul Simon in Concert: Live Rhymin'
- Released: 1974
- Genre: Folk rock
- Length: 4:21
- Label: Columbia Records
- Songwriter: Paul Simon
- Producer: Paul Simon

Paul Simon singles chronology
"Take Me to the Mardi Gras" (1974)	"The Sound of Silence" (1974)	"Gone at Last" (1975)

Paul Simon released a solo acoustic version of "The Sound of Silence" in the spring of 1974. His version reached No. 84 in Canada and No. 97 on the US Cash Box chart. It was also a minor Adult Contemporary hit (US No. 50, Canada No. 42).

Simon had previously recorded a solo acoustic version of the song on his debut solo album The Paul Simon Songbook, released in 1965 in the UK only, and not widely available in the U.S. until its release as part of a retrospective box set in the 1980s.

== Legacy ==
In 1999, BMI named "The Sound of Silence" as the 18th most-performed song of the 20th century. In 2004, it was ranked No. 156 on Rolling Stone's list of the 500 Greatest Songs of All Time, one of the duo's three songs on the list. The song is now considered "the quintessential folk rock release".

In 2004, the song was inducted into the Grammy Hall of Fame. In June 2026, CBS News included the song in its list of the 250 essential American songs of the past 250 years.

== In popular culture ==
When director Mike Nichols and Sam O'Steen were editing the 1967 film The Graduate, they initially timed some scenes to this song, intending to substitute original music for the scenes. However, they eventually concluded that an adequate substitute could not be found and decided to purchase the rights for the song for the soundtrack. This was an unusual decision, as the song had charted more than a year earlier, and recycling established music for film was not commonly done at the time.

The Canadian band Rush alluded to the song lyrics in the last lines of their 1980 song "The Spirit of Radio".

In 2017, the song re-emerged on Billboard's Hot Rock Songs Chart at No. 6, due to its use in a YouTube video and meme involving Ben Affleck's facial expression during an interview about his film Batman v Superman, dubbed "Sad Affleck".

== Bibliography ==
- Eliot, Marc (2010). Paul Simon: A Life. John Wiley and Sons. ISBN 978-0-470-43363-8.
- Fornatale, Pete (2007). Simon and Garfunkel's Bookends. Rodale. ISBN 978-1-59486-427-8.
