= Classical Gas (disambiguation) =

"Classical Gas" is a 1968 instrumental by Mason Williams.

Classical Gas may also refer to:

- Classical Gas (Tommy Emmanuel album), a 1995 album by Tommy Emmanuel
- Classical Gas (Mason Williams and Mannheim Steamroller album), a 1987 album by Mason Williams and Mannheim Steamroller
- the properties of an ideal gas in classical physics
