= Gone Is Love =

Studio album by Paul Mauriat and His Orchestra
- Released: 1970
- Genre: Easy listening
- Label: Philips
- Producer: Paul Leka

Gone Is Love is a studio album released by Paul Mauriat and his Orchestra in 1970 on Philips LP record 600345. The title track was released as a single (Philips) 40683 which charted on the Easy Listening top-40.

== Reception ==
Billboard reviewed the album as having "distinctive arrangements and voicings", and being "intelligent easy listening". The album entered the Billboard Top LPs chart on September 19, 1970, and remained on the chart for three weeks, peaking at position No. 184.

== Track listing ==
| No. | Title | Length |
|---|---|---|
| 1. | "Gone Is Love" (J. Reed – G. Sklerov) | 2:35 |
| 2. | "Home Again" (J. Reed – G. Sklerov) | 3:03 |
| 3. | "My House and the River" (Paul Mauriat) | 2:53 |
| 4. | "Could This Be Me" (G. Zummo) | 3:32 |
| 5. | "Raindrops Keep Fallin' on My Head" (Burt Bacharach – Hal David) | 2:47 |
| 6. | "I Gotta Get Back to Lovin’ You" (P. Leka – J. Reed) | 3:30 |
| 7. | "Bridge Over Troubled Water" (Paul Simon – Art Garfunkel) | 3:00 |
| 8. | "She Is a Little Bit Sweeter" (P. Leka) | 2:15 |
| 9. | "Let It Be" (Paul McCartney – John Lennon) | 2:55 |
| 10. | "Classical Gas" (Mason Williams) | 2:50 |
| 11. | "Medley: Bridge Over Troubled Water / Let It Be" (Simon Garfunkel / McCartney - Lennon) | 4:23 |
| Total length: | | 33:43 |
