= Classical Gas (Mason Williams and Mannheim Steamroller album) =

Album by Mannheim Steamroller, Mason Williams

Studio album by Mason Williams and Mannheim Steamroller
- Released: 22 October 1987
- Genre: New-age
- Length: 37:28
- Label: American Gramaphone
- Producer: Chip Davis

Mannheim Steamroller chronology
Saving the Wildlife (1986)	Classical Gas (1987)	A Fresh Aire Christmas (1988)

Mason Williams chronology
Of Time and Rivers Flowing (1984)	Classical Gas (1987)	A Gift of Song (1992)

Classical Gas is a 1987 album by new age group Mannheim Steamroller and guitarist/composer Mason Williams. The album's title piece, "Classical Gas", was originally featured on Williams's 1968 solo album The Mason Williams Phonograph Record.

== Track listing ==
All tracks are written by Mason Williams, unless otherwise noted.

No.	Title	Writer(s)	Length
1.	"Classical Gas"		3:32
2.	"Sunflower"		2:14
3.	"Samba Beach"		3:59
4.	"Country Idyll"		2:18
5.	"Saturday Night at the World"		3:56
6.	"Shady Dell"		3:23
7.	"Katydid's Ditty"		0:58
8.	"Greensleeves"	traditional	3:07
9.	"Doot-Doot"		2:08
10.	"La Chanson de Claudine"		3:17
11.	"McCall"		2:41
12.	"Vancouver Island"		2:50
13.	"Baroque-a-Nova"		3:06
Total length:			37:28

== Personnel ==
=== Performance credits ===
- Mannheim Steamroller – primary artist; drums; recorder
- Mason Williams – primary artist; guitar; horn
- Clinton Gregory – cello
- Jackson Berkey – keyboards
- Ron Cooley – guitar; electric guitar; rhythm guitar
- Chip Davis – drums; recorder; baton
- Bob Jenkins – oboe
- Deborah Fuller – violin
- Joey Gulizia – percussion
- Eric Hansen – bass
- David Low – cello
- Roxanne Adams – violin
- Grace Granata – violin
- David Kappy – French horn
- Richard Lohmann – violin
- Bill Ritchie – double bass
- Bill Erickson – accordion
- Sherrie Goeden – viola
- Joshua Kuhl – double bass
- Russell Powell - bass guitar
- Michelle Mathewson – viola
- Arthur McCann – saxophone
- Jim Schanilec – trombone
- Scott Shoemaker – violin
- David Wampler – trombone
- Candida Wiley – violin
- Margaret Wilmeth – cello
- Bochmann String Quartet – group

=== Technical credits ===
- Mason Williams – composer; liner notes
- Mannheim Steamroller – contributor
- Chip Davis – director; producer; contributor; orchestration
- Clete Baker – mastering
- John Boyd – engineer
- Joe Gastwirt – mastering
- Howie Weinberg – mastering
- Steve Shipps – contributor
- Dick Lewsey – engineer

== In popular culture ==
- The title track was featured in "The Great Crane Robbery", a 2000 episode of Frasier. When Frasier's new boss copies his apartment down to the last detail, Frasier tries redecorating, and the song plays over a montage of him trying a long series of ridiculous styles of décor.
- The title track appeared in S1:E5 "Fork" of Netflix's limited series, The Queen's Gambit.
- The title track was briefly featured in S5:E8 "Marco Polo" of HBO's The Sopranos.
