= List of Billboard 200 number-one albums of 1968 =

These are the Billboard magazine number-one pop albums of 1968.

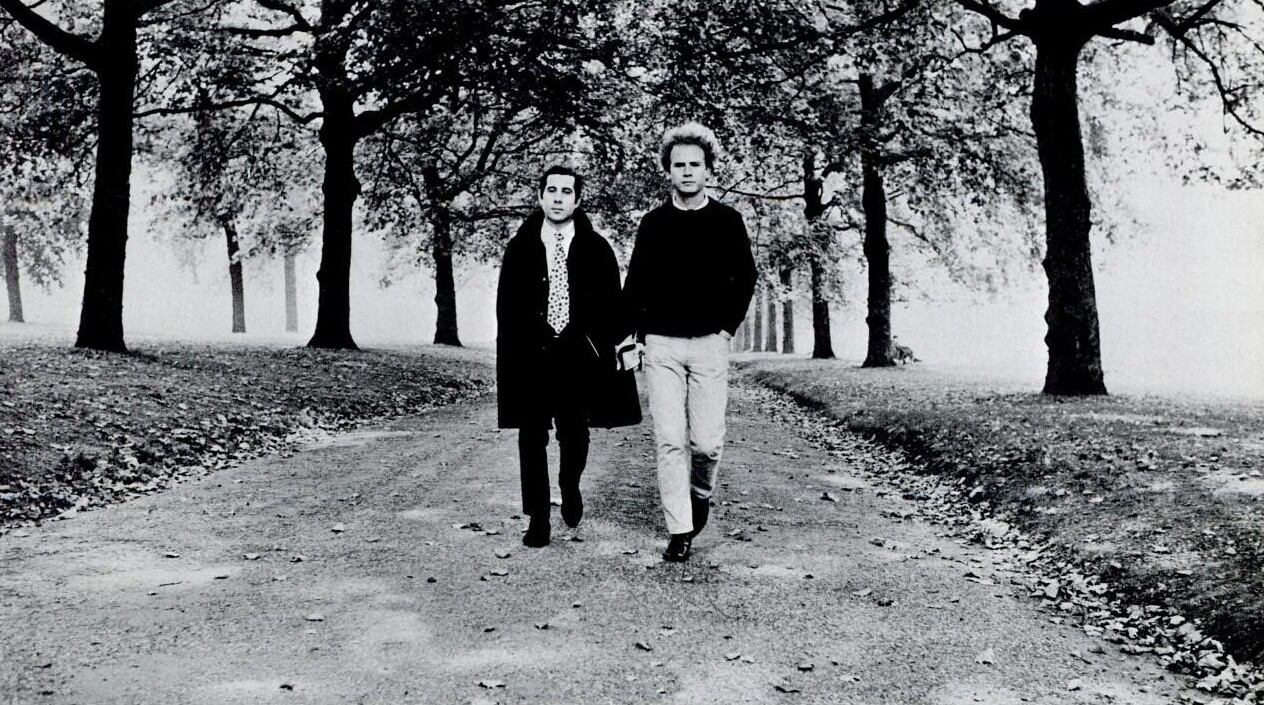
Simon & Garfunkel had two number one albums, The Graduate soundtrack and Bookends, which spent a combined 16 consecutive weeks at number one.

== Chart history ==
Key
†	Indicates best performing album of 1968

Issue date	Album	Artist(s)	Label	Ref.
January 6	Magical Mystery Tour †	The Beatles / Soundtrack	Capitol	
January 13	Magical Mystery Tour †	The Beatles / Soundtrack	Capitol	
January 20	Magical Mystery Tour †	The Beatles / Soundtrack	Capitol	
January 27	Magical Mystery Tour †	The Beatles / Soundtrack	Capitol	
February 3	Magical Mystery Tour †	The Beatles / Soundtrack	Capitol	
February 10	Magical Mystery Tour †	The Beatles / Soundtrack	Capitol	
February 17	Magical Mystery Tour †	The Beatles / Soundtrack	Capitol	
February 24	Magical Mystery Tour †	The Beatles / Soundtrack	Capitol	
March 2	Blooming Hits	Paul Mauriat and His Orchestra	Philips	
March 9	Blooming Hits	Paul Mauriat and His Orchestra	Philips	
March 16	Blooming Hits	Paul Mauriat and His Orchestra	Philips	
March 23	Blooming Hits	Paul Mauriat and His Orchestra	Philips	
March 30	Blooming Hits	Paul Mauriat and His Orchestra	Philips	
April 6	The Graduate	Simon & Garfunkel / Soundtrack	Columbia	
April 13	The Graduate	Simon & Garfunkel / Soundtrack	Columbia	
April 20	The Graduate	Simon & Garfunkel / Soundtrack	Columbia	
April 27	The Graduate	Simon & Garfunkel / Soundtrack	Columbia	
May 4	The Graduate	Simon & Garfunkel / Soundtrack	Columbia	
May 11	The Graduate	Simon & Garfunkel / Soundtrack	Columbia	
May 18	The Graduate	Simon & Garfunkel / Soundtrack	Columbia	
May 25	Bookends	Simon & Garfunkel	Columbia	
June 1	Bookends	Simon & Garfunkel	Columbia	
June 8	Bookends	Simon & Garfunkel	Columbia	
June 15	The Graduate	Simon & Garfunkel / Soundtrack	Columbia	
June 22	The Graduate	Simon & Garfunkel / Soundtrack	Columbia	
June 29	Bookends	Simon & Garfunkel	Columbia	
July 6	Bookends	Simon & Garfunkel	Columbia	
July 13	Bookends	Simon & Garfunkel	Columbia	
July 20	Bookends	Simon & Garfunkel	Columbia	
July 27	The Beat of the Brass	Herb Alpert and the Tijuana Brass	A&M	
August 3	The Beat of the Brass	Herb Alpert and the Tijuana Brass	A&M	
August 10	Wheels of Fire	Cream	Atco	
August 17	Wheels of Fire	Cream	Atco	
August 24	Wheels of Fire	Cream	Atco	
August 31	Wheels of Fire	Cream	Atco	
September 7	Waiting for the Sun	The Doors	Elektra	
September 14	Waiting for the Sun	The Doors	Elektra	
September 21	Waiting for the Sun	The Doors	Elektra	
September 28	Time Peace: The Rascals' Greatest Hits	The Rascals	Atlantic	
October 5	Waiting for the Sun	The Doors	Elektra	
October 12	Cheap Thrills	Big Brother and the Holding Company	Columbia	
October 19	Cheap Thrills	Big Brother and the Holding Company	Columbia	
October 26	Cheap Thrills	Big Brother and the Holding Company	Columbia	
November 2	Cheap Thrills	Big Brother and the Holding Company	Columbia	
November 9	Cheap Thrills	Big Brother and the Holding Company	Columbia	
November 16	Electric Ladyland	Jimi Hendrix Experience	Reprise	
November 23	Electric Ladyland	Jimi Hendrix Experience	Reprise	
November 30	Cheap Thrills	Big Brother and the Holding Company	Columbia	
December 7	Cheap Thrills	Big Brother and the Holding Company	Columbia	
December 14	Cheap Thrills	Big Brother and the Holding Company	Columbia	
December 21	Wichita Lineman	Glen Campbell	Capitol	
December 28	The Beatles (The White Album)	The Beatles	Apple	

== See also ==
- 1968 in music
