= Saving the Wildlife =

Studio album by Mannheim Steamroller
- Released: 1986
- Genre: New age
- Length: 35:48
- Label: American Gramaphone
- Producer: Chip Davis

Mannheim Steamroller chronology
Fresh Aire VI (1986)	Saving the Wildlife (1986)	Classical Gas (1987)

Professional ratings
Review scores
Source	Rating
AllMusic	3/5 stars

Saving the Wildlife is an album by Mannheim Steamroller, released in 1986. It was written for the soundtrack of a PBS special by the same name, except for "Dolphins and Whales," which originally appeared on Fresh Aire VI as "Come Home to the Sea".

== Track listing ==
All tracks are written by Chip Davis.

No.	Title	Length
1.	"Rhinos and Elephants (Africa)"	4:07
2.	"Dolphins and Whales (Come Home To The Sea)"	4:50
3.	"Wolfgang Amadeus Penguin (Argentina)"	2:01
4.	"Florida Suite: a. Barbeque (USA); b. Everglades (USA); c. Sunset (USA)"	5:56
5.	"Wolves (USA)"	3:05
6.	"Tamarin Monkeys (Rio de Janeiro)"	3:08
7.	"Grizzly Bears (USA)"	2:58
8.	"Tigers and Lions (India)"	3:00
9.	"Eagles (USA)"	3:02
10.	"Amanda Panda (China)"	1:47
11.	"Harp Seals (Canada)"	1:35
Total length:		35:48

== Personnel ==
- Jackson Berkey - keyboards
- Chip Davis - drums, recorders
- Joey Gulizia - ethnic percussion
- Ron Agnew - guitar
- Ric Swanson - percussion
