= Blooming Hits =

1967 album by Paul Mauriat

Studio album by Paul Mauriat and His Orchestra
- Recorded: 1967
- Genre: Pop
- Length: 25:51
- Label: Philips

Blooming Hits was a studio instrumental album by Paul Mauriat and His Orchestra. It was released in 1967 and spent five weeks at number one in 1968. It was certified as a Gold LP by the Recording Industry Association of America. The single "Love Is Blue" hit number one on the Billboard Hot 100 in 1968. The success of this song in the United States led to Philips Records requesting Mauriat's French label to complete an entire album. The completed album included instrumentals of hits such as the Beatles' "Penny Lane," Herman's Hermits' "There's a Kind of Hush," Frank and Nancy Sinatra's "Somethin' Stupid" and Sandie Shaw's 1967 Eurovision song contest winner "Puppet on a String." The album was briefly re-released by Collectors' Choice Music on CD, but is now out of print.

== Track listing ==
1. "Somethin' Stupid"
2. "Penny Lane"
3. "This Is My Song"
4. "Seuls Au Monde (Alone in the World)"
5. "Inch Allah"
6. "(There's a) Kind of Hush"
7. "Puppet on a String"
8. "L'Amour Est Bleu (Love Is Blue)"
9. "Adieu a La Nutt (Adieu to the Night)"
10. "Mama"

== See also ==
- List of Billboard 200 number-one albums of 1968
