= The Wayfarers Trio =

- Origin: United States
- Genres: Folk music
- Years active: 1959–1961
- Label: Mercury
- Past members: Mason Williams; Bill Cheatwood; Baxter Taylor

The Wayfarers Trio were an American folk music trio founded in 1959 and consisting of Oklahoma City University college students, Billy Cheatwood, Mason Williams, and Baxter Taylor. The Wayfarers Trio first played publicly at The Gourd coffeehouse in Oklahoma City, Oklahoma in 1959. The Trio had a recording contract with Mercury Records and issued a couple singles and one album Songs of the Blue & Grey, released in April 1961 on Mercury MG 20634 to commemorate the 100th anniversary of the beginning of the Civil War. They disbanded after college.

Joseph Lawrence Hampson later of The Travellers also played with the group.
