= EP 2003: Music for the Epicurean Harkener =

EP by Mason Williams
- Released: December 25, 2003
- Genre: Easy listening

Mason Williams chronology
Of Time and Rivers Flowing (1996)	EP 2003: Music for the Epicurean Harkener (2003)	Electrical Gas (2005)

EP 2003: Music for the Epicurean Harkener is a 2003 EP released on Christmas Day by instrumental Mason Williams. The EP was nominated for Best Pop Instrumental Album at the 47th Annual Grammy Awards (held on February 13, 2005). It was his first and only nomination in the category.

== Track listing ==
1. "Large DeLuxe"-4:37
2. "Flamenco Lingo"-2:44
3. "Trade Winds"-3:56
4. "McCall"-2:50
5. "Santa Fe Souvenir"-3:46
6. "Destinations of the Sun"-3:50
