= Fresh Aire VI =

Studio album by Mannheim Steamroller
- Released: September 15, 1986
- Recorded: 1986
- Genre: New age
- Length: 45:22
- Label: American Gramaphone
- Producer: Chip Davis

Mannheim Steamroller chronology
Mannheim Steamroller Christmas (1984)	Fresh Aire VI (1986)	Saving the Wildlife (1986)

Professional ratings
Review scores
Source	Rating
Allmusic	3/5 stars

Fresh Aire VI is Mannheim Steamroller's sixth album in the Fresh Aire series, and seventh overall. Fresh Aire VI was released in 1986, and is inspired by Greek mythology. It was Mannheim Steamroller's second album to appear on the Billboard album chart, reaching #155 in January 1987.

Tracks two through four comprise the "Rhodes Suite." Tracks seven through nine comprise the "Orpheus Suite." Track ten, "Sirens," consists of four different parts: "Crash and the Call", "The Dance", "The Singing Contest" & "Farewell."

== Track listing ==
All tracks are written by Chip Davis.

No.	Title	Length
1.	"Come Home to the Sea"	4:52
2.	"Twilight at Rhodes"	2:01
3.	"Night Festival at Rhodes"	3:53
4.	"Sunrise at Rhodes"	3:48
5.	"The Olympics"	2:24
6.	"Nepenthe"	5:30
7.	"Descend into the Underworld"	4:08
8.	"Dialogue with the Devil"	2:08
9.	"Ascent From Hell"	4:10
10.	"Sirens": "Crash and the Call"; "The Dance"; "The Singing Contest"; "Farewell"	11:53
Total length:		45:22

== Personnel ==
- Chip Davis – drums
- Jackson Berkey – keyboards
- London Symphony Orchestra
- Cambridge Singers
- Additional musicians on "The Olympics" - Eric Hansen, Ron Cooley, Dave Kappy, Denny Schneider, Dave Wompler, Jim Schanelic, Craig Fuller
- Sirens/Emulator Voices – Liz Westphalen, Pam Kalal, Denise Fackler
- Liner notes: Jim Shey, Classics Department, University of Wisconsin
