= Classical Gas =

1968 instrumental musical piece

Single by Mason Williams

from the album The Mason Williams Phonograph Record
- B-side: "Long Time Blues"
- Released: April 1968
- Genre: Baroque pop, easy listening, classical music, instrumental, and classical crossover
- Length: 3:00
- Label: Warner Bros.
- Songwriter: Mason Williams
- Producer: Mike Post

Audio sample
- file; help

"Classical Gas" is an instrumental musical piece composed and originally performed by American guitarist Mason Williams with instrumental backing by members of the Wrecking Crew. Originally released in 1968 on the album The Mason Williams Phonograph Record, it has been re-recorded and re-released numerous times since by Williams. One later version served as the title track of a 1987 album by Williams and the band Mannheim Steamroller.

== History ==
Originally named "Classical Gasoline", the tune was envisioned to be "fuel" for the classical guitar repertoire. The title was later inadvertently shortened by a music copyist. Mike Post, later famous for television theme music, was a producer and arranger for the song.

Williams was the head writer for the Smothers Brothers Comedy Hour at the time of the piece's release, and he premiered the composition on the show and performed it several times over several episodes.

After the piece had reached the top 10, Williams asked an experimental filmmaker named Dan McLaughlin to adjust a student video montage that he had created of classical art works using Beethoven's Symphony No. 5 and edit it in time to "Classical Gas", using the visual effect now known as kinestasis. The work, 3000 Years of Art, premiered in 1968 on an episode of the Smothers Brothers Comedy Hour. The song peaked at number two for two weeks in August that year, behind "Hello, I Love You" by The Doors. On the US Easy Listening chart, it went to number one for three weeks.

"Classical Gas" is sometimes erroneously thought to have been performed or even composed by Eric Clapton, because Clapton was the musical director of and played much of the guitar music for the feature film The Story of Us, in which Williams' own recording of it from his album Handmade appeared.

Williams re-recorded "Classical Gas" as a solo guitar piece on his 1970 album Handmade. This version was re-released by Sony in 2003, after being featured in the film Cheaper by the Dozen, which starred Williams' Smothers Brothers protégé, actor/comedian/musician Steve Martin.

Williams’ original version of "Classical Gas" was also used on the soundtrack of the popular 2000 Australian movie The Dish.

From the mid-1970s to early '80s, Williams' version of "Classical Gas" was used by television stations across the United States as their opening news themes. News music company Telesound followed with an identically named and quicker-tempo version of the song for television stations to use.

== Awards and honors ==
- In 1969, the piece won three Grammy Awards: Best Instrumental Composition, Best Contemporary-Pop Performance, Instrumental, and Best Instrumental Arrangement.
- In 1998, Broadcast Music Incorporated (BMI) awarded Williams a special Citation of Achievement. The piece has logged over five million broadcast performances to become BMI's all-time number-one instrumental composition for radio air play.

== Charts ==
=== Weekly charts ===
Mason Williams
Chart (1968)	Peak position
Australia (Go-Set)	6
Canada RPM Top Singles	2
Ireland (IRMA)	18
New Zealand (Listener)	13
UK Singles Chart	9
US Billboard Hot 100	2
US Easy Listening (Billboard)	1
US Cash Box Top 100	1

=== Year-end charts ===
Chart (1968)	Rank
Canada	54
US Billboard Hot 100	43
US Cash Box Top 100	58

== Cover versions and later versions ==
- As Williams was a writer for The Glen Campbell Goodtime Hour, star Glen Campbell covered the song multiple times on the show.
- The Midnight String Quartet covered the song on their 1968 album The Look of Love and Other Rhapsodies for Young Lovers. In Canada, this version was co-charted with the Mason Williams version, and they reached number two on the RPM charts.
- In 1968, the Alan Copeland Singers recorded a song that combined "Classical Gas" with "Scarborough Fair".
- The Ventures recorded a cover for the album More Golden Greats, released in 1969.
- Paul Mauriat and his Orchestra recorded a cover for the album Gone Is Love, released in 1970.
- Hugo Montenegro and his Orchestra recorded a cover for the album The Best of Hugo Montenegro, released in 1970.
- Deep Feeling, UK progressive rock band, recorded the song on their 1971 album, Deep Feeling.
- Rick Wakeman, a British progressive rock keyboardist, performed a version for piano on the 1971 album Piano Vibrations.
- A college marching band plays the song at a basketball game in the 1971 film Drive, He Said.
- The progressive rock band Beggars Opera (band) recorded a cover, which was released on their Get Your Dog Off Me! album in 1973.
- Under the name Synergy, Larry Fast recorded an electronic version for the album Sequencer in 1976. This version has served as the theme song for the WUSB (FM) radio program, Destinies-The Voice of Science Fiction, since 1983.
- The Shadows recorded a version for their 1979 album String of Hits.
- Argentine virtuoso guitarist Cacho Tirao (member of the Astor Piazzolla quintet) recorded the song along with Jorge Padín and Manolo Juárez for their 1980 album Encuentro.
- Dutch violinist Judy Schomp and flautist Berdien Stenberg (then still performing under her real name of Steunenberg) recorded a version for their 1980 LP Secret Gardens, performed on violin and concert flute.
- In 1983, Hong Kong cantopop singer/music producer George Lam put Chinese lyrics to the music and turned it into a cantopop song, entitled "Love Story" in Chinese. It can be found on the album bearing the same title.
- Chet Atkins recorded the song for his 1986 album Street Dreams.
- Drummer Cozy Powell released a cover of the track on his 1992 album The Drums Are Back.
- Vanessa-Mae recorded the song for her 1994 album The Violin Player.
- Zlatko Manojlović, Serbian guitarist, included the song on his 1995 album Zlatko.
- Tommy Emmanuel recorded the song with the Australian Philharmonic Orchestra on his 1996 album, Classical Gas.
- Australian actor and musician Daniel Amalm released a cover of "Classical Gas" in 1996 that peaked at number 31 on the Australian ARIA Singles Chart that May.
- California Guitar Trio released a cover version on their 1998 album Pathways.

== See also ==
- List of number-one adult contemporary singles of 1968 (U.S.)
