= The Mason Williams Phonograph Record =

1968 album by Mason Williams

Studio album by Mason Williams
- Released: February 1968
- Genre: Easy listening, classical, instrumental rock, classical crossover
- Length: 29:40
- Label: Warner Bros. Records
- Producer: Mike Post

Mason Williams chronology
The Smothers Brothers Play It Straight (1966)	The Mason Williams Phonograph Record (1968)	The Mason Williams Ear Show (1968)

The Mason Williams Phonograph Record is an album by classical guitarist and composer Mason Williams, released in 1968. It is Williams's most successful and best-known album, and features the instrumental "Classical Gas", his signature song. Williams won two Grammy Awards, for Best Pop Instrumental Performance and Best Instrumental Theme, while Mike Post won Best Instrumental Arrangement for the piece. In Canada, the album peaked at number 16, and in the US it peaked at number 14.

== Track listing ==
All tracks are written by Mason Williams, unless otherwise noted.

No.	Title	Writer(s)	Length
1.	"Overture"	Mike Post	1:49
2.	"All the Time"		2:40
3.	"Dylan Thomas"	Lowell Mason, uncredited – tune of "London Bridge Is Falling Down"	0:29
4.	"Wanderlove"		3:22
5.	"She's Gone Away"		2:15
6.	"Here Am I"		4:06
7.	"Classical Gas"		3:06
8.	"Long Time Blues"		3:35
9.	"Baroque-a-Nova"	Allan Blye, Mason Williams	2:20
10.	"The Prince's Panties"		1:40
11.	"Life Song"		0:27
12.	"Sunflower"		3:43
Total length:			29:40

Arranged by Al Capps, except "Overture" and "Classical Gas" by Mike Post, and "Dylan Thomas" and "Life Song" by Williams. The first pressing of the vinyl label misspelled "The Prince's Panties" as "Princess Panties".

== Personnel ==
Musicians

- Mason Williams – guitar, main performer and composer
- Carl Fortina – accordion
- Bob West, Lawrence Knechtel, Lyle Ritz – bass
- Armand Kaproff, Jerome Kessler, Jesse Ehrlich, Joe DiTullio – cello
- Lyle Ritz – double bass
- James Beck Gordon – drums
- David Duke, William Hinshaw – French horn, tuben
- Alvin Casey, David Cohen, James Burton, Michael Deasy – guitar
- Gail Levant – harp
- Gary L. Coleman, Gene Estes – percussion
- Lawrence Knechtel, Michael Melvoin – piano
- Richard J. Hyde, Hoyt Bohannon, Lew McCreary, Richard Leith – trombone
- David Burk, Emanuel Moss, George Kast, Harry Bluestone, Israel Baker, Jack Gootkin, Jimmy Getzoff, Jerry Reisler, John Vidor, Ralph Schaeffer, Robert Korda, Robert Sushel, Sidney Sharp, Stan Plummer, Tibor Zelig, William Kurasch – violin
- Jim Horn, Tommy Scott – woodwind

Production

- Mike Post – producer
- Phil Kaye – effects
- Stan Cornyn – liner notes
