= Paul Mauriat =

French orchestra leader

Background information
- Born: Paul Julien André Mauriat; 4 March 1925; Marseille, Bouches-du-Rhône, France
- Died: 3 November 2006 (aged 81) Perpignan, Pyrénées-Orientales, France
- Genres: Classical, easy listening, Rock
- Occupations: Musician, orchestra leader, composer
- Instruments: Piano, Organ
- Years active: 1942–1998
- Labels: Philips, Pony Canyon, Universal
- Formerly of: Charles Aznavour; Maurice Chevalier; Mireille Mathieu

Paul Julien André Mauriat (French: [pɔl mɔʁja] or [moʁja]; 4 March 1925 – 3 November 2006) was a French orchestra leader, conductor of Le Grand Orchestre de Paul Mauriat, who specialized in the easy listening genre. He is best known in the United States for his million-selling remake of André Popp's "Love is Blue", which was number 1 for 5 weeks in 1968. Other recordings for which he is known include "El Bimbo", "Toccata", "Love in Every Room/Même si tu revenais", and "Penelope". He (using the pseudonym Del Roma) co-wrote the song "Chariot" (also known as "I Will Follow Him") with Franck Pourcel (using the pseudonym J.W. Stole).

== Biography ==
=== 1925–1956: Early life and career ===
Mauriat was born in 1925 in Marseille, Bouches-du-Rhône, France where he spent his childhood years. His father was a postal inspector who loved to play classical piano and violin. Mauriat began playing the piano between the ages of three and four, and his father gave him music lessons when he was eight. In 1935, at the age of 10, he enrolled in the Conservatoire in Marseille to study classical music, but by the time he was 17, he had fallen in love with jazz and popular music.

Mauriat had his first job as a postman, but in 1942 when he was 17, he was hired as a band conductor. His dance band toured concert halls throughout Europe throughout the 1940s. He was based in Marseilles until 1958 when he moved to Paris. Mauriat became the musical director for at least two well-known French singers, Charles Aznavour and Maurice Chevalier, touring with both of them. He arranged 135 songs by Aznavour, including "La Bohème", "La mamma", and "Tu t'laisses aller", and worked with Aznavour until he concentrated on his own touring and recording career in the 1960s.

=== 1957–1962: First studio recordings ===
In 1957, Mauriat released his first EP, Paul Mauriat, a four-track RGM release. One of his first songs, Rendez-vous au Lavandou, co-written with André Pascal, was awarded the 1958 Coq d'or de la Chanson Française.

Between 1959 and 1964, Mauriat recorded several albums on the Bel-Air record label under the name Paul Mauriat et Son Orchestre, as well as using the various pseudonyms of Richard Audrey, Nico Papadopoulos, Eduardo Ruo, and Willy Twist, to better reflect the international flavour of his recordings. During this period, Mauriat also released several recordings with Les Satellites, where he creatively arranged vocal backing harmony for such albums as Slow Rock and Twist (1961), A Malypense (1962), and Les Satellites Chantent Noël (1964).

Mauriat composed the music for several French movie soundtracks (also released on Bel-Air), including Un Taxi Pour Tobrouk (1961), Horace 62 (1962), and Faites Sauter La Banque (1964).

=== 1963–1997: International acclaim and later career ===
Using the pseudonym of Del Roma, Mauriat was to have his first international hit with Chariot, which he wrote in collaboration with friends Franck Pourcel (co-composer), Jacques Plante (French lyrics) and Raymond Lefèvre (orchestrator). In the United States, the song was recorded as "I Will Follow Him" by Little Peggy March and spent three weeks at No. 1 on the Billboard Hot 100 in 1963. In 1992, the song was featured prominently in the film Sister Act starring Whoopi Goldberg. More recently, Eminem sampled it in his song "Guilty Conscience".

Mauriat started recording under his own name with Philips Records in 1965 as the label was interested in someone who could compete with Franck Pourcel, who was the dominant figure at that time. Between 1967 and 1972, he also wrote numerous songs with André Pascal for Mireille Mathieu; Mon Crédo (1,335,000 copies sold), Viens dans ma rue, La première étoile, Géant.

In 1968, his late 1967 cover of the André Popp/Pierre Cour tune "L'amour est bleu" ("Love Is Blue") became a number 1 hit in the US. The song spent five weeks at the top of the charts. Two other Mauriat singles also made the charts in the US — "Love in Every Room"/"Même si tu revenais" (recorded in 1965; charted in 1968) and the title theme from the movie "Chitty, Chitty, Bang, Bang". "Love Is Blue" was the first instrumental to hit number 1 on the Billboard charts since the Tornados hit with "Telstar" in 1962 and the only American number-one single to be recorded in France. The success of the song and the album on which it appeared, Blooming Hits, established Mauriat as an international recording star.

In 1969, Mauriat started his first world tour with his Grand Orchestra, visiting countries like the United States, Canada, Japan, South Korea, Brazil and other Latin American countries.

In the 1970s and 1980s, Mauriat released albums that paid homage to his musical roots. "Paul Mauriat joue Chopin" and "Classics in the Air" (volumes 1,2,3) feature classical music, like Chopin's "Grande valse brillante", Bach's "Toccata and Fugue in D Minor", and Pachelbel's "Canon", given the "Mauriat spin". El Cóndor Pasa peaked at number 34 in Australia in 1971

Mauriat's collaboration with long-time arranger Gérard Gambus resulted in the 1978 disco/funk album Overseas Call, which was later rediscovered by rare disco collectors in the 2000s. The album was recorded at the Power Station studio in New York and engineered and remixed by disco producer Bob Clearmountain. One of the tracks, "The Joy of You," was included in DJ Dimitri from Paris's influential 2007 compilation Cocktail Disco. Dimitri described the Cocktail Disco sub-genre as having "that ubiquitous 4/4 beat and flying open high hat, complemented by rich orchestrations, campy over the top vocals, and an often tropical Latin vibe. Something that wouldn't feel out of place in a Broadway musical." He also pointed out that he believes "the same style was called Sleaze back in its days, from roughly 1976 to 1979. There were even DJs specialized in the Sleaze sound which was usually played after hours, in spots with a strong sex-oriented drive."

Paul Mauriat enjoyed particularly phenomenal success in Japan starting in the late 1960s. He is the only international artist who ever played two sold-out shows in one day at the famous arena Nippon Budokan in Tokyo. In the early to mid-1980s, Paul Mauriat appeared in several Japanese coffee and wine television commercials, which featured music from his orchestra. He had sold over 15 million albums in Japan and performed over 1,000 shows in 25 Japanese tours by 1996.

For several decades, some of Mauriat's compositions served as musical tracks for Soviet television programmes and short movies, such as the 1977 animated Polygon, "In the world of animals" (V mire zhivotnykh) and "Kinopanorama", among others.

=== 1998–2006: Retirement and death ===
Paul Mauriat retired from performing in 1998. He gave his final performance in the Sayonara Concert, recorded live in Osaka, Japan, but his orchestra continued to tour around the world before his death in 2006. Mauriat's former lead pianist, Gilles Gambus, became the orchestra's conductor in 2000 and led successful tours of Japan, China, and Russia. Gambus had worked with Mauriat for more than 25 years. In 2005 a classical French Horn instrumentalist named Jean-Jacques Justafré conducted the orchestra during a tour of Japan and Korea.

On 3 November 2006, Paul Mauriat died in Perpignan, Pyrénées-Orientales, France, at the age of 81.

== Recordings ==
Relative to his peers, Paul Mauriat has one of the largest recording catalogues, featuring more than 1,000 titles just from his PolyGram era (1965–1993). Both Mauriat's single recording "Love is Blue" (1967) and the album Blooming Hits each sold over one million copies. The single was awarded a gold disc by the Recording Industry Association of America in March 1968.

In 1965, Mauriat established Le Grand Orchestre de Paul Mauriat, and released hundreds of recordings and compilations through the Philips label for the next 28 years. In 1994, he signed with Japanese record company Pony Canyon, where he re-recorded some of his greatest hits and wrote new compositions. Mauriat recorded many of these albums in both Paris and London, utilising several English classical musicians in these recordings.

== Recognition ==
He was awarded the Grand Prix (Grand Prize) from the French recording industry, a MIDEM trophy, and in 1997 won the prestigious distinction of Commandeur des Arts et des Lettres from the French Ministry of Culture. He has sold 6 million records in Japan.

In 2002, Serge Elhaïk published an authorised biography, Paul Mauriat: une vie en bleu.

A line of saxophones and trumpets manufactured in Taiwan are named for Paul Mauriat under the brand P. Mauriat.

== Discography ==
=== Singles ===
- "Puppet on a String" (1967)
- "Love Is Blue" (U.S. No. 1, 1968; AC No. 1, 1968)
- "Love In Every Room" (U.S. No. 60, 1968; AC No. 7, 1968)
- "San Francisco" (U.S. No. 103, 1968; AC No. 16, 1968)
- "Chitty Chitty Bang Bang" (U.S. No. 76, 1969; AC No. 24, 1969; CAN No. 75, 1969)
- "Hey Jude" (U.S. No. 119, 1969; AC No. 24, 1969)
- "Je T'aime Moi Non Plus" (AC No. 35, January 1970)
- "Gone Is Love" (AC No. 32, September 1970)
- "Etude in the Form of Rhythm and Blues " (1971)
- "Apres Toi (Come What May)" (AC No. 21, 1971)
- "A Summer Place" (1972)
- "Love Theme from The Godfather" (Butterfly) (1972)
- "Taka Takata" (1972)
- "Varelie's Theme " (1972)
- "Forever And Ever " (1973)
- "Love Is Still Blue " (US No. 109, 1977)

=== Albums ===
- Viva Cha Cha Cha (1959) (as Eduardo Ruo)
- Jamais le dimanche (1960) (as Nico Papadopoulos)
- Tu viens danser! (1960)
- Paris by Night (1961)
- Plays Standards (1963)
- Paul Mauriat joue pour les enfants (1963)
- Album no 1 (1965)
- Russie de toujours (1965)
- Album no 2 (1965)
- Album no 3 (1966)
- Prestige de Paris (1966)
- Parlez-moi d'amour (1966)
- Album no 4 (1966)
- Bang, bang (1966)
- More Mauriat (1967)
- Mauriat Magic (1967)
- Album no 5 (1967)
- Noëls (Also released as The Christmas Album (1967), White Christmas (1973)
- Album no 6 (1967)
- Blooming Hits (1967) (Philips) (Reissued in 2006 by Universal Music Enterprises)
- Love Is Blue (1968)
- Viva Mauriat (1968)
- Mauriat slows (1968)
- Rain and Tears (1968)
- Cent mille chansons (1968)
- Rhythm and Blues (1968)
- The Soul of Paul Mauriat (1969)
- Doing My Thing (1969)
- Je t'aime... moi non plus (1969)
- Un jour, un enfant (1969)
- L.O.V.E. (1969)
- Vole, vole, Farandole (1969)
- Prevailing Airs (1969)
- Paul Mauriat joue Chopin (1970)
- Paul Mauriat Let the Sunshine in/Midnight Cowboy/ And Other Goodies (1970)
- C'est la vie... Lily (1970)
- Gone Is Love (1970)
- Comme j'ai toujours envie d'aimer (album) (1970)
- Paloma Embriagada (1970)
- Un banc, un arbre, une rue (1971)
- Mamy Blue (1971)
- Penelope (1971)
- El Condor Pasa (1971)
- Tombe la neige (1971)
- Après toi (1972)
- L'Avventura (1972)
- La Décadanse (1972)
- Last Summer Day (1972)
- Paul Mauriat joue les Beatles (1972)
- Le Lac Majeur (1972)
- Forever and Ever (1973)
- Nous irons à Vérone (1973)
- Last Tango in Paris (1973)
- Good bye, My Love, Good bye (1973)
- White Christmas (1973)
- Viens ce Soir (1974)
- Retalhos de Cetim (1974)
- Je pense à toi (1974)
- Le premier pas (1974)
- I Won't Last a Day Without You (1974)
- L'Été indien (1975)
- Entre Dos Aguas (1975)
- The Best of Paul Mauriat – 10 Years With Philips (1975) ???
- From Souvenirs to Souvenirs (1975)
- Lili Marlene (1975)
- Stereo Spectacular (1975)
- The Paul Mauriat Orchestra (Have You Never Been Mellow) (1975)
- Love Sounds Journey (1976)
- Michelle (1976)
- Love Is Still Blue (1976)
- Il était une fois... nous deux (1976)
- Chanson d'amour (1977)
- C'est La Vie (1977)
- Hymne à l'amour (1977)
- Brasil Exclusivamente (1977)
- L'oiseau et l'enfant (1977)
- The Bird and the Child (1977)
- Overseas Call (1978)
- Dans les yeux d'Émilie (1978)
- Ça Ne Fait Rien Les Couilles, Voici Paul Mauriat (1978)
- Brasil Exclusivamente Vol.2 (1978)
- Too Much Heaven (1979)
- Nous (1979)
- Copacabana (1979)
- Aerosong (1980)
- Chromatic (1980)
- Brasil Exclusivamente Vol.3 (1980)
- Reality (1981)
- Pour le plaisir (1981)
- Je n'pourrai jamais t'oublier (1981)
- Roma dalla Finestra (1982)
- Tout pour la musique (1982)
- Magic (1982)
- I Love Breeze (1982)
- Descendant of the Dragon (1982)
- Love with Many Phases (1982 in Hong Kong)(癡情劫)
- Wild Spring (1983)
- Summer Has Flown (1983)
- Olive Tree (1984)
- Piano Ballade (1984)
- The Seven Seas (1984)
- The Best Of Paul Mauriat Vol. II (1984)
- Around the World (Taiwan edition) (1985)
- Transparence (1985)
- The Best of Paul Mauriat 2 — 20 Years With Philips (1985) ???
- Classics in the Air (1985)
- Windy (1986)
- Classics in the Air 2 (1986)
- Song for Taipei (1986)
- Classics in the Air 3 (1987)
- Nagekidori (1987)
- Love Is Blue (20th Anniversary Edition) (1987)
- Best of France (1988)
- The Paul Mauriat Story (1988)
- Serenade (1989)
- Iberia (1989)
- Remember (1990)
- You Don't Know Me (1990)
- Gold Concert (1990)
- Retrospective (1991)
- Nostal Jazz (1991)
- Emotion (1993)
- The Russian Album (1993) (Philips, remaster of Russie de toujours, 1965)
- The Color of the Lovers (1994)
- Now and Then (1994)
- Soundtracks (1995)
- Quartet for Kobe (1995)
- Escapades (1996)
- Cri d'amour (1996)
- 30th Anniversary Concert (1996)
- Romantic (1997)
- Sayonara Concert (1998)
- I Will Follow Him (2000)
- All the Best (2003, in China)
- Paul Mauriat Boxsets Vol 3 & 4 (2007, Universal Music, Japan)
- Les merveilleuses orchestrations de Paul Mauriat (2012, Marianne Mélodie)

== See also ==
- Faites sauter la banque! (film, 1964)
