= Mason Williams =

American musician (born 1938)

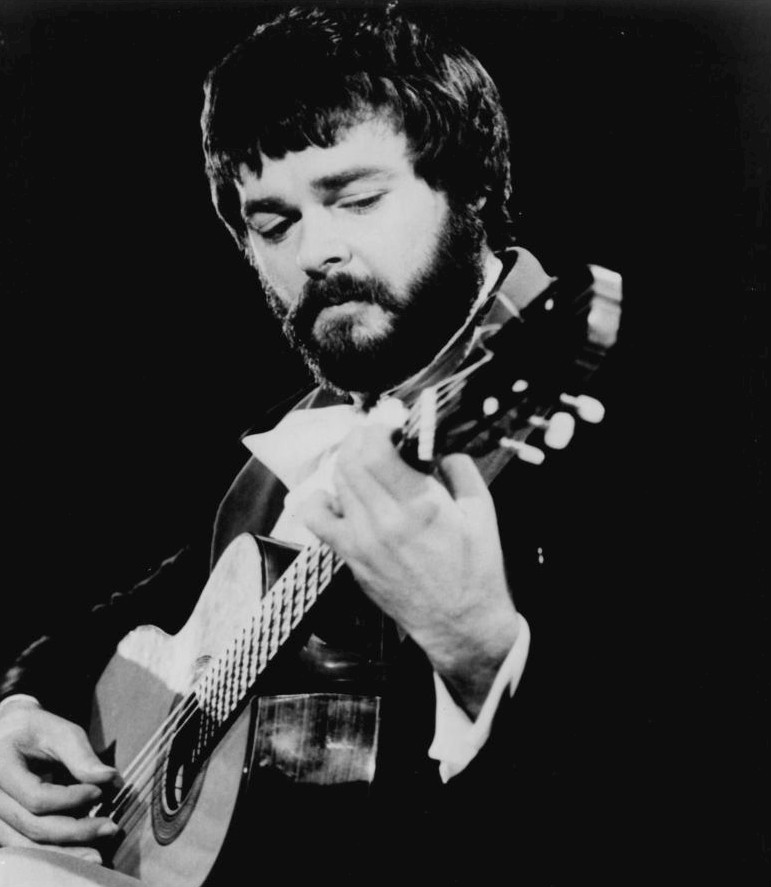
- Williams in 1969

Background information
- Born: Mason Douglas Williams; August 24, 1938 (age 88); Abilene, Texas, U.S.
- Genres: Easy listening, classical, bluegrass, folk
- Occupations: Musician, composer, songwriter, writer, poet, photographer
- Instruments: Guitar, banjo
- Years active: 1958–present
- Labels: American Gramaphone, Everest, Flying Fish, Olympic, Real Music, Skookum, Vanguard, Vee-Jay, Warner Bros., WEA
- Website: masonwilliams-online.com

Mason Douglas Williams (born August 24, 1938) is an American classical guitarist, composer, singer, writer, comedian, and poet, best known for his 1968 instrumental "Classical Gas" and for his work as a comedy writer on The Smothers Brothers Comedy Hour, The Glen Campbell Goodtime Hour, and Saturday Night Live.

== Early life ==
Williams was born in Abilene, Texas, the son of Jackson Eugene (a tile setter) (1914-1995) and Kathlyn (née Nations) Williams (1916-1976).

Williams grew up dividing his time between living with his father in Oklahoma and his mother in Oakridge, Oregon. He graduated from Northwest Classen High School in Oklahoma City, Oklahoma in 1956. In Oklahoma, he began his lifelong friendship with the artist Edward Ruscha.

He attended Oklahoma City University (1957–60) and North Texas State University for one semester, and served in the United States Navy from 1961 to 1963.

== Career ==
=== Music ===
==== "Classical Gas" and early success ====
In 1968, Mason's instrumental, "Classical Gas", was released as a single from The Mason Williams Phonograph Record. The song won three Grammy Awards: "Best Instrumental (theme) Composition", "Best Instrumental (theme) Performance", and "Best Instrumental Orchestra Arrangement", Mike Post, arranger. It sold over one million copies and was awarded a gold disc.

He also wrote songs for The Kingston Trio. Together with Nancy Ames, he wrote "Cinderella Rockefella", a 1968 number-one hit for Esther and Abi Ofarim in the United Kingdom.

In 1970, Williams made a television appearance on a variety show, Just Friends, which reunited regulars of The Smothers Brothers Comedy Hour. To create a visual element for his performance, he used a special playable classical plexiglass guitar built for him by Billy Cheatwood and a prop designer for ABC. For the performance, Williams filled the guitar with water and added a couple of goldfish. He then used the plexiglass guitar to finger-sync his hit version of "Classical Gas".

==== Warner Bros. albums and collaborations ====
Williams has recorded more than a dozen albums. Five were released on the Warner Bros. label: The Mason Williams Phonograph Record (1968), The Mason Williams Ear Show (1968), Music by Mason Williams (1968), (Note: The LP cover for Music by Mason Williams was painted by pop artist Edward Ruscha. The credit reads "Sorry, Cover by Edward Ruscha." Williams relates that when compiling the 1992 compilation album, he went to Warner Bros. and asked, "Where's that painting that Ed Ruscha did for that old [Music] cover?" He was told it had been thrown away, a probable loss of $3–5 million.) Hand Made (1970), and Sharepickers (1971). For both Hand Made and Sharepickers, Mason received two more Grammy nominations for "Best Album Cover Design".

==== Benefit concerts and orchestral performances ====
In December 1970, Williams performed benefit concerts for the Pala Indian Reservation Cultural Center hosted by Clairemont High School. Sponsored by the nonprofit Americans for Indian Future and Tradition, with the help of Ken Kragen and Friends, Williams performed two shows. The event raised enough funds to pay for the construction of the block walls.

Williams then concentrated on a variety of programs for his concert appearances. His "Concert for Bluegrass Band and Orchestra", also titled "Symphonic Bluegrass", has been performed with over 40 symphony orchestras. These include the Colorado Symphony Orchestra, Kansas City Symphony, Louisiana Philharmonic Orchestra, Oklahoma City Philharmonic, Louisville Orchestra, and Edmonton Symphony Orchestra. In 1994, he played six sold-out concerts with the Oregon Symphony in Portland, Oregon. In the 1990s, he also performed with the Eugene Symphony with friend Ken Kesey.

==== Of Time & Rivers Flowing and environmental work ====
In 1984, Williams released an album, Of Time & Rivers Flowing, on his own Skookum label. The album contained 14 of the roughly 35 songs performed in the concert. In 1993, the title cut from the album was used as the soundtrack for a 90-second public service announcement (PSA) created by the American Rivers Council on the home video release of A River Runs Through It. The PSA was also on the 1995 home video release of The River Wild.

That same year, Williams was invited to play for Oregon Governor John Kitzhaber's inauguration. In 1996, Williams received an honorary doctorate in music from his alma mater, Oklahoma City University. In 1999, Williams played again for Kitzhaber's second inauguration. In the spring, he played his Of Time and Rivers Flowing concert with the Oregon Children's Choral Festival, a two-day event involving 3,000 elementary school children singing water and rivers songs with Williams and his band. Williams received the Distinguished Service Award from the University of Oregon in honor of his contribution to the arts in Oregon.

==== Later albums and recognition ====
In 1987, he teamed with Mannheim Steamroller to release a new album on the American Gramaphone label. The album, titled Classical Gas, included a remake of the 1968 composition. Another track from the album, "Country Idyll", was a 1988 nominee for a Grammy in the country music category for "Best Instrumental Performance by a Soloist, Group or Orchestra". The album went gold in 1991. Williams' plexiglass guitar appears on the cover of the album.

He released an acoustic instrumental album of Christmas and holiday music, A Gift of Song, on the Real Music label. It featured arrangements of traditional carols and original compositions. In 1992, the Vanguard label released Music 1968–1971, a compilation of tracks from his five Warner Bros. albums recorded in the late 1960s and early 1970s. In conjunction with the release of this album, Williams added a "Holiday Concert Program" to his repertoire, featuring music from the album and other traditional music of the season.

In 1998, BMI, the performance-rights organization that tracks air-play performances on radio and television, presented Williams with a Special Citation of Achievement in recognition of the great national and international popularity of "Classical Gas". By 2008, the song logged over six million broadcast performances, to become the all-time number-one instrumental composition for air play in BMI's repertoire.

==== Film, television, and recent work ====
Williams' music has been featured in several movies. These include The Story of Us, Cheaper by the Dozen, The Dish, The Heidi Chronicles, and Heartbreakers. His compositions also have been played on the television series The Sopranos.

In late 1999, the Bluegrass Band and he played for Byron Berline's Oklahoma International Bluegrass Festival in Guthrie, Oklahoma, with the Oklahoma City Philharmonic. In February 1999, Williams' "Bus" art piece was included in the Norton Simon Museum exhibition "Radical Past", in Pasadena, California.

In 2003, Williams released an EP, Music for the Epicurean Harkener. He was again nominated for a Grammy in 2004 for best instrumental album. In 2005, he collaborated with UK guitarist Zoe McCulloch on the album Electrical Gas. In June 2006, Williams performed at his 50th high-school reunion at Northwest Classen High School in Oklahoma City. He performed with other musicians as Mason Williams and Friends at concerts in Eugene and Springfield (Oregon) and at the opening gala at the Richard E. Wildish Community Theater in Springfield.

In January 2007, he was reunited with long-time friend and artist Edward Ruscha, performing at the Getty Center in Los Angeles. In October 2007, he was inducted into the Oregon Music Hall of Fame and co-headlined a concert with Everclear and Paul Revere and the Raiders.

In 2022, BGO Records announced the release of a two-CD collection of five of his early albums.

=== Comedy ===
==== Stand-up comedy and "them poems" ====
Outside of music, Williams performed as a stand-up comedian. He set most of his comic ideas to music and sang or recited the jokes in lyric form with guitar accompaniment.

In 1964, Vee-Jay Records released Them Poems, a record album on which Williams entertains a live audience with "them poems about them people". The album covered such varied topics as "Them Moose Goosers", "Them Sand Pickers", and "Them Surf Serfs". A typical "them poem" is "Them Banjo Pickers", which begins: "Them banjo pickers! Mighty funny ways. Same damn song three or four days!"

Several other "them" poems, along with many ditties, song lyrics, odd and amusing photographs from around the country, and assorted bits of visual and verbal silliness are collected in The Mason Williams Reading Matter (Doubleday, 1969). The Them Poems record album was reissued (also in 1969, on the heels of the success of "Classical Gas") as The Mason Williams Listening Matter.

==== The Smothers Brothers Comedy Hour ====
Williams has written more than 175 hours of music and comedy for network television programming. He was a prime creative force for CBS' controversial Smothers Brothers Comedy Hour. His experience in folk music gave him the background for many of Tom and Dick Smothers' comedy routines. With co-writer Nancy Ames, he also composed the show's musical theme.

On the Smothers Brothers Comedy Hour, he created and perpetuated the 1968 "Pat Paulsen for President" campaign, an elaborate political satire. Williams also helped launch the career of entertainer Steve Martin. Martin was hired by Williams as a writer on the Smothers Brothers Comedy Hour. His contributions were initially paid out of Williams' own pocket.

In 1968, he won an Emmy Award for his work as a comedy writer on The Smothers Brothers Comedy Hour.

==== Other television work ====
Other television personalities for whom he has written include Andy Williams, Glen Campbell, Dinah Shore, Roger Miller, and Petula Clark.

In 1980, Williams briefly served as head writer for NBC's Saturday Night Live. He left after clashing with producer Jean Doumanian.

In 1988, Williams received his third Emmy nomination as a comedy writer for his work on The Smothers Brothers 20th Reunion Special on CBS.

==== Later career and reunions ====
In February 2000, Williams participated in the U.S. Comedy Arts Festival in Aspen, Colorado. The sixth annual festival honored The Smothers Brothers Comedy Hour and its contribution to television. Williams performed a concert with Tom and Dick Smothers. He also performed on a late-night show with performers that included Catherine O'Hara, Martin Short, Andrea Martin, Steve Martin, Robin Williams, and Marc Shaiman.

=== Other artistic work ===
Williams published Bus, a life-sized screenprint of a Greyhound bus, in 1967. The photograph was commissioned from street photographer Max Yavno and enlarged by a commercial printer onto sixteen sheets of billboard paper. Williams assembled the prints using 120 feet (37 m) of Scotch tape. The completed work measured approximately 10 by 36 feet (3.0 m × 11.0 m). Bus toured the country, with stops at MoMA and Radio City Music Hall, appeared in Life magazine, and served as a set piece on The Smothers Brothers Comedy Hour. Williams appeared with the print on the cover of his first album. The project, published in an edition of 200, reflected the influence of Williams' friend and collaborator Ed Ruscha.

Williams created a book titled The Mason Williams Reading Matter, published by Doubleday & Company, with copyright dates ranging from 1964 to 1969. The book included original poetry, many of which had comical lyrics, and original photographs.

In 1967, Williams attempted to document the drawing of the world's biggest sunflower on film. As Williams remarked, "the film was to be a slow-motion aerial ballet in which an old bi-wing aeroplane skywrites 'draws' the stem and leaves of a flower in the sky beneath the sun, the sun itself thereby becoming the blossom of a 'Sun' flower." Due to technical difficulties dealing with filming directly into the sun, the film did not turn out. Nevertheless, the completed flower measured 2 by 3 miles (3.2 km × 4.8 km) and lasted 40 seconds.

== Environmentalism ==
After becoming involved in protests against a Willamette River hydroelectric power project, Williams eventually collected over 400 songs about rivers. He created a program called Of Time and Rivers Flowing that encompasses classical, folk, minstrel, gospel, jazz, country, pop, and contemporary rock music genres.

== Personal life ==
Williams married Sheila Ann Massey on April 22, 1961; they had one daughter, Kathryn Michelle, before divorcing.

He remarried, to Katherine Elizabeth Kahn, in February 1994; the couple divorced after 10 years.

He lives in Eugene, Oregon, with his Canadian-born wife, Karen, an attorney.

== Discography ==
=== Albums ===
==== As a band member ====
- Folk Music as Heard at the Gourd, Mason Williams, Steve Brainerd, Johnny Horton & Joe Lawrence, 1960
- Songs of the Blue and Grey, The Wayfarers Trio, 1961
- More Hootenanny, The Hootenaires, 1963

==== As principal artist ====
- Them Poems, 1964
- The Mason Williams Phonograph Record, 1968, No. 14 US
- The Sound of Mason Williams, with Paul Sykes & the Oklahoma City Philharmonic Orchestra, 1968
- The Mason Williams Ear Show, 1968, No. 164 US
- Music by Mason Williams, 1969 No. 44 US
- The Mason Williams Listening Matter (Them Poems re-release), 1969
- Hand Made, 1970
- Improved, 1971
- Sharepickers, 1971
- Fresh Fish, with The Santa Fe Recital, 1975
- Of Time & Rivers Flowing, 1984
- Music 1968-1971, 1992
- A Gift of Song, 1992
- Electrical Gas, with Zoe McCulloch, 2005
- Classical Gas, with Mannheim Steamroller, 2006

==== Compilation ====
- Feuding Banjos, various artists, 1995

=== Singles ===
- "Little Billy Blue Shoes" / "Run Comeun See", The Wayfarers Trio, 1960
- "Love Are Wine" / "The Exciting Accident", 1966
- "Classical Gas" / "Long Time Blues", 1968
- "Baroque-a-Nova" / "Wanderlove", 1968
- "Saturday Night at the World" / "One Minute Commercial", 1968
- "Greensleeves" / "$13 Stella", 1969
- "A Gift of Song" / "A Major Thing", 1969
- "José's Piece" / "Find a Reason to Believe", 1970
- "Train Ride in G" / "Here I Am Again", 1971

=== EPs ===
- EP 2003: Music for the Epicurean Harkener, 2003
- O Christmas Three, 2009

=== For others ===
- Folk Baroque, producer/arranger, 1963
- Introducing Jayne Heather, arranger/musician, 1965
- Tour de Farce, The Smothers Brothers, sideman/songwriter, 1965
- The Smothers Brothers Play It Straight, co-producer, 1966
- Jennifer, Jennifer Warnes, guest vocalist, 1969
- Fiddle & a Song, Byron Berline, sideman, 1995
- 1995 Sony Disc Manufacturing Holiday Choir, producer, 1995

=== Compilation appearances ===
- The Big Hootenanny, 1963
- I Am an American, 1963
- The Twelve-String Story Vol. 1, 1963
- The Twelve-String Story Vol. 2, 1963
- The Banjo Story, 1963
- 5-String Banjo Greats, 1964
- Rock Instrumental Classics Vol. 2: The Sixties, 1994
- 1968 Billboard Top Pop Hits, 1995
- Cascadia (1996 Oregon Governor's Arts Awards), 1996

== Bibliography ==
- Williams, Mason (1964). Bicyclists Dismount. Hollywood, California: Davon Music Corp.
- Williams, Mason; Willis, Robert (1966). Tosadnessday. Los Angeles, California: Tasmania Press. OCLC 18044019.
- Williams, Mason (1966). The Night I Lost My Baby: A Las Vegas Vignette. Los Angeles, California. OCLC 220227.
- Williams, Mason; Ruscha, Edward; Blackwell, Patrick (1967). Royal Road Test. New York: G. Wittenborn. OCLC 7879.
- Williams, Mason (1967). Boneless Roast. Los Angeles. OCLC 219548.
- Williams, Mason; Kragen, Jinx (1968). Pat Paulsen for President. California: Kragen/Fritz. OCLC 4163051.
- Williams, Mason; Willis, Robert (1969). Roadsign Business. Los Angeles, California: M. Williams. OCLC 123471907.
- Williams, Mason (1969). The Mason Williams Reading Matter. Garden City, New York: Doubleday. OCLC 786486344.
- Ruscha, Edward; Williams, Mason (1969). Crackers. Hollywood, California: Heavy Industries. OCLC 656916.
- Williams, Mason (1970). The Mason Williams F.C.C. Rapport. New York: Liveright. OCLC 1502747.
- Williams, Mason (1970). Flavors. Garden City, New York: Doubleday. OCLC 94643.
- Williams, Mason (1997). Santa's Scenic Trip Home. Lubbock, Texas: Flotsam & Jetsam. OCLC 311874920.
- Williams, Mason; Gardiner, James R. (2000). Them Poems. Madison, Wisconsin: Parallel Press. ISBN 978-1-893311-11-4.
