= Ed Ames discography =

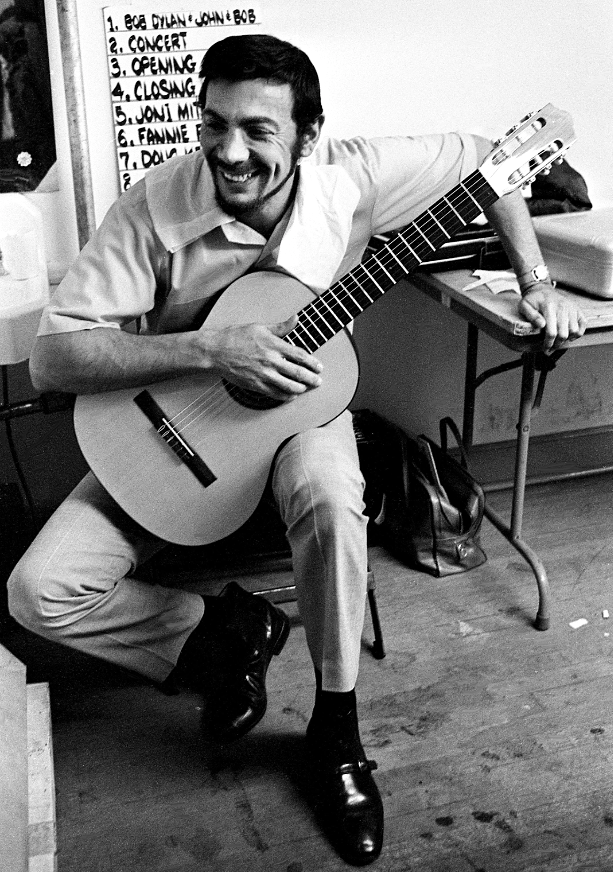
- Ed Ames warms up backstage of the Ryman Auditorium on May 6, 1969.
- Studio albums: 22
- Compilation albums: 9
- Singles: 25
- Collaboration singles: 1
- Promotional singles: 5

This is the discography of American pop and easy listening singer Ed Ames. Shown below are only his solo releases. It contains 22 studio albums, 9 compilation albums, 25 singles and other releases. Ames' debut single was 1956's "The Bean Song", released by RCA Victor while he was still recording with the Ames Brothers. It went unnoticed, and Ames' solo recording career would actually begin in 1963 with "Before I Kiss the World Goodbye", which received a positive reception. After several other singles, he scored a hit in 1965 with his 1964 recording of "Try To Remember", which hit the pop and easy listening charts.

The following singles failed to reach the charts, and it would only be in 1966 when his single "My Cup Runneth Over" would score him a hit. The single quickly reached the top-10 of the pop charts in the US and Canada, and managed to top the Billboard Easy Listening chart. It spawned a top-5 pop album, which received the RIAA certification for Gold. "Time, Time" would follow the success with fewer sales, and the third single "Timeless Love" completely missed the Billboard Hot 100. In September, Ames took up a James Last tune "When the Snow Is on the Roses" which returned him to the Easy Listening number 1 spot, and the pop Hot 100. Ames changed direction with the 1967 protest song "Who Will Answer?, which returned him to the pop top-20 in the US, and scored him his biggest success in Canada. Who Will Answer? in 1968 achieved him another RIAA certification. The following singles in 1968 would consistently reach the charts. Ames' 1968 original recording of "Kiss Her Now" from Dear World spawned a full Broadway themed album as well.

In 1969, due to slipping sales, Ames would change his message of songs again. "Changing, Changing", "Son of a Travelin' Man", and "Leave Them a Flower", all preached change, travelling, and nature. During the year, he also recorded with American singer Marilyn Maye, "Think Summer" was the single they released, which reached the Easy Listening top-20. By the end of the year, Ames' and RCA's efforts would not lead to an increase in sales, with the final album of 1969 for Ames, Love of the Common People failing to reach the top-150 on any type of chart. In 1970, the duet single was reissued and reached number 38 in the US, the same position as Ames' cover of "Three Good Reasons" released in March 1970. Sing Away the World was Ames' second-to-last charting album, reaching number 194 in the summer. The folk-pop song "Chippewa Town" became Ames' final entry on the Easy Listening chart, though RCA continued releasing several other singles until 1973. In 1971, a tribute to Burt Bacharach & Hal David would make Ames reach the Billboard 200 one last time. In 1972, he would record another tribute, this time a country-themed album to Jim Reeves. Ed Ames recordings would be featured on a number of compilations released by RCA throughout the years.

== Albums ==
=== Studio albums ===
List of studio albums, showing all relevant details
Year	Title	Peak chart positions		Certification
Year	Title	US 200	US CB	Certification
1964	Opening Night with Ed Ames	—	—	
1964	The Ed Ames Album	—	—	
1965	My Kind of Songs	—	—	
1965	It's a Man's World	—	—	
1966	More I Cannot Wish You	90	100	
1966	My Cup Runneth Over	4	4	RIAA: Gold
1967	Time, Time	77	57	
1967	Christmas with Ed Ames	11	—	
1967	When the Snow Is on the Roses	24	22	
1968	Who Will Answer?	13	12	RIAA: Gold
1968	Sings Apologize	135	87	
1968	The Hits of Broadway and Hollywood	186	70	
1969	A Time for Living, a Time for Hope	114	91	
1969	The Windmills of Your Mind	157	72	
1969	Love of the Common People	172	—	
1970	Sing Away the World	194	—	
1970	Christmas is the Warmest Time of the Year	—	—	
1971	Sings the Songs of Bacharach and David	199	—	
1972	Ed Ames	—	—	
1972	Ed Ames Remembers Jim Reeves	—	—	
1972	Songs from "Lost Horizon" and Themes from Other Movies	—	—	

=== Compilation albums ===
List of compilation albums, showing all relevant details
Title	Album details	Peak chart positions
Title	Album details	US 200
The Best of Ed Ames	Released: September 1969; Label: RCA Victor; Formats: LP, 8-track cartridge	119
This is Ed Ames	Released: 1970; Label: RCA Victor; Formats: LP, 2 record set	—
Somewhere My Love	Released: 1972; Label: RCA Camden; Formats: LP	—
Ed Ames	Released: 1972; Label: RCA Camden; Formats: LP	—
Do You Hear What I Hear	Released: 1973; Label: RCA Camden; Formats: LP; Reissue of Christmas with Ed Ames with one track replaced	—
Try To Remember	Released: 1974; Label: RCA Camden; Formats: LP	—
Ed Ames - Pure Gold	Released: 1976; Label: RCA; Formats: LP	—
The Very Best of Ed Ames	Released: 2000; Label: Taragon Records; Formats: CD	—
The Very Best of Ed Ames	Released: July 10, 2001; Label: RCA; Formats: CD; Note: Unrelated to previous compilation	—

== Singles ==
=== As lead artist ===
List of singles, with selected chart positions, showing other relevant details
Single	Year	Chart Positions						Album
Single	Year	US AC	US	CB	CAN (RPM)	CAN (AC)	AUS	Album
"Before I Kiss the World Goodbye"	1963	–	–	–	–	–	–	Opening Night with Ed Ames
"It Only Takes a Moment"	1964	–	–	–	–	–	–	Non LP-tracks
"Give Me Back My Life"	1964	–	–	–	–	–	–	Non LP-tracks
"Try to Remember"	1964	17	73	83	39	–	–	Opening Night with Ed Ames
"Dio Mio"	1965	–	–	–	–	–	–	Non LP-tracks
"Melinda"	1965	–	–	–	–	–	–	My Cup Runneth Over
"River Boy"	1966	–	–	–	–	–	–	It's a Man's World
"There's a Time for Everything"	1966	–	–	–	–	–	–	My Cup Runneth Over
"My Cup Runneth Over"	1966	1	8	8	9	–	34	My Cup Runneth Over
"Time, Time"	1967	1	61	66	60	–	–	Time, Time
"Timeless Love"	1967	2	–	109	–	–	–	When the Snow Is on the Roses
"When the Snow Is on the Roses"	1967	1	98	97	–	–	–	When the Snow Is on the Roses
"Who Will Answer?"	1967	6	19	14	6	–	71	Who Will Answer and Other Songs of our Time
"Apologize"	1968	10	79	66	47	–	–	Sings Apologize
"All My Love's Laughter"	1968	12	122	106	–	–	–	Non LP-tracks
"Kiss Her Now"	1968	22	–	77	65	–	–	The Hits of Broadway and Hollywood
"Changing, Changing"	1969	11	130	112	–	6	–	A Time for Living, a Time for Hope
"Son of a Travelin' Man"	1969	21	92	94	81	14	61	The Windmills of Your Mind
"Think Summer" (with Marilyn Maye)	1969	17	–	–	–	–	–	Non LP-tracks
"Leave Them a Flower"	1969	19	–	–	–	33	–	Love of the Common People
"A Thing Called Love"	1969	21	–	115	–	22	–	Love of the Common People
"Three Good Reasons"	1970	28	–	–	–	–	–	Sing Away the World
"Think Summer" (Rerelease)	1970	38	–	–	–	–	–	Non LP-tracks
"Chippewa Town"	1970	36	–	–	–	–	–	Non LP-tracks
"Sweet, Sweet Reason"	1970	–	–	–	–	–	–	Non LP-tracks
"He Gives Us All His Love"	1971	–	–	–	–	–	–	Non LP-tracks
"And I Love You So"	1972	–	–	–	–	–	–	Ed Ames
"Distant Drums"	1972	–	–	–	–	–	–	Ed Ames Remembers Jim Reeves
"Lost Horizon"	1972	–	–	–	–	–	–	Songs from "Lost Horizon" and Themes from Other Movies
"Butterflies Are Free"	1973	–	–	–	–	–	–	Songs from "Lost Horizon" and Themes from Other Movies
"—" denotes releases that did not chart or were not released in that territory.

=== Promotional singles ===
List of promotional singles, showing all relevant details
Title	Year	Album	Ref.
"Hello, Lyndon!"	1964	—N/a	
"My Cup Runneth Over"	1966	My Cup Runneth Over	
"Let It Snow! Let It Snow! Let It Snow!"	1968	Christmas with Ed Ames	
"Changing, Changing"	1969	A Time for Living, a Time for Hope	
"Butterflies Are Free"	1973	Songs from "Lost Horizon" and Themes from Other Movies	
