= The Best of Ed Ames =

Compilation album by Ed Ames
- Released: September 1969
- Studios: RCA's Music Center of the World, Hollywood, California
- Genres: Pop; Easy listening
- Label: RCA Victor
- Producers: Jim Foglesong; Joe Reisman

Ed Ames chronology
The Windmills of Your Mind (1969)	The Best of Ed Ames (1969)	Love of the Common People (1969)

Singles from The Best of Ed Ames
- 1. "Try To Remember" Released: December 1964; 2. "My Cup Runneth Over" Released: November 1966; 3. "Time, Time" Released: April 1967; 4. "When the Snow Is on the Roses" Released: September 1967; 5. "Who Will Answer?" Released: December 1967; 6. "Apologize" Released: April 1968; 7. "Kiss Her Now" Released: October 1968; 8. "Changing, Changing" Released: February 1969

The Best of Ed Ames is a compilation album by American pop singer Ed Ames. It was released in September 1969 via RCA Victor. The Best of Ed Ames was the first compilation album of Ames's solo career and features 11 tracks, including multiple singles by Ames that topped the Billboard Easy Listening chart, and received pop sales as well. The album received positive reviews from several contemporary publications and became another charting release for the singer, reaching the charts in October.

== Background and recording ==
Ed Ames had been a recording artist for the RCA Victor label since the 1950s, during his time in the Ames Brothers vocal group. In 1966, his solo career took off with the hit "My Cup Runneth Over". He continued to have hit singles and best-selling albums. The songs for The Best of Ed Ames were recorded at RCA's Music Center of the World, located in Hollywood, California. All of them were produced by Jim Foglesong and one was also produced by Joe Reisman. Arrangements were provided by Jimmy Wisner, Sid Bass, and Perry Botkin Jr.. Claus Ogerman is credited with conducting "Try to Remember".

== Release ==
The Best of Ed Ames was originally released in September 1969 by RCA Victor. The label also made it available on an 8-track cartridge tape. It was the first compilation album of Ames's solo career. The label originally offered it as a vinyl LP, with six songs on "Side A" and five songs on "Side B". The album hasn't been rereleased to digital streaming platforms. However, its tracks can be found in various other rereleased albums.

== Critical reception ==
The album received a positive critical reception upon its release. Billboard magazine believed that "One of the most popular and distinctive of male vocalists, Ed Ames has enjoyed much deserved success recently, and this 'Best of' album clearly shows why." They also stated that "Here also are such Ames gems as 'Bon Soir Dame,' 'Apologize,' 'Time, Time'". Cashbox said that "this album will be picked up in great numbers by the following that he has gathered over the years." They highlighted "The Impossible Dream," "Try To Remember," and "My Cup Runneth Over," noting that The Best of Ed Ames "will show chart movement shortly." Retrospectively, The Virgin Encyclopedia of Popular Music gave the album a three-star rating, which meant that the album was "good" and "therefore recommended."

== Chart performance and singles ==
The Best of Ed Ames debuted on Billboard magazine's Top LP's chart in the issue dated October 18, 1969, peaking at No. 119 during a sixteen-week run on the chart. It was his only charting compilation.

A total of eight singles were included on The Best of Ed Ames. Only one 1969 release was included, the message-oriented "Changing, Changing" which had "bubbled under" the Hot 100, with a final position of No. 130. The second most recent single on the project was released in October 1968, titled "Kiss Her Now" from the musical Dear World. It became a top-25 single on America's Billboard adult contemporary chart, rising to the number 21 position. In Canada the single reached the pop charts instead, peaking at No. 65 on the RPM Top 100 Singles chart.

The first single was his first solo success, "Try to Remember". It became a success on the easy listening charts, reaching the top-20, and also entered the lower regions of the pop charts in 1965 as well. The main highlight was the second single released at the end of 1966, "My Cup Runneth Over", which topped the easy listening charts, and reached the top-10 on the pop charts in both the US and Canada; his only single to have achieved this success. Four other well-charting singles were released in 1967 and 1968, "Time, Time," "When the Snow Is on the Roses," "Who Will Answer?," "Apologize".

== Track listing ==
Side one
No.	Title	Writer(s)	Length
1.	"My Cup Runneth Over"	Harvey Schmidt; Tom Jones	2:44
2.	"Apologize"	Jimmy Griffin; Michael Z. Gordon	2:04
3.	"When the Snow Is on the Roses"	Eddie Snyder; Ernst Bader; James Last; Larry Kusik	2:45
4.	"Try to Remember"	Harvey Schmidt; Tom Jones	3:57
5.	"Changing, Changing"	Sheila Davis	3:19
6.	"Bon Soir Dame"	Bud Dashiell	2:48

Side two
No.	Title	Writer(s)	Length
1.	"Who Will Answer? (Aleluya No. 1)"	Luis Eduardo Aute; Sheila Davis	3:40
2.	"Time, Time"	Renato Canfora; Giuseppe Baselli; Mort Shuman	2:50
3.	"Kiss Her Now"	Jerry Herman	2:08
4.	"The Color of Snow"	Jones; Green	2:26
5.	"The Impossible Dream (The Quest)"	Joe Darion; Mitch Leigh	2:33

== Charts ==
Chart peaks for The Best of Ed Ames
Chart (1969)	Peak position
US Billboard Top LP's	119

== Personnel ==
All credits are adapted from the liner notes of The Best of Ed Ames.

- Ed Ames – vocals
- Jim Foglesong – producer
- Claus Ogerman, (tracks: A4) – conductor
- Perry Botkin Jr., (tracks: A1 to A3, A5, B1 to B4) – arranger, conductor
- Sid Bass, (tracks: B5) – arranger, conductor
- Jimmy Wisner, (tracks: A6) – arranger, conductor
