= My cup runneth over (disambiguation) =

"My cup runneth over" is a quote from the Hebrew Bible.

My cup runneth over can also refer to:

- "My Cup Runneth Over", a song from the musical I Do! I Do!
  - "My Cup Runneth Over" (song), a cover of the song by Ed Ames
- My Cup Runneth Over (album) by Ed Ames
