= Time, Time =

Studio album by Ed Ames
- Released: June 1967
- Recorded: Early 1967
- Genre: Traditional pop
- Length: 30:47
- Label: RCA Victor
- Producer: Jim Foglesong

Ed Ames chronology
| My Cup Runneth Over (1967) | Time, Time (1967) | Christmas with Ed Ames (1967) |

Singles from Time, Time
- 1. "Time, Time" Released: April 1967

Time, Time is a studio album by Ed Ames, released in the summer of 1967. It mainly consisted of cover songs of either pop hits or current showtunes. The album followed Ames' single "Time, Time", which managed to top the Easy Listening chart published by Billboard magazine. Time, Time itself achieved peak positions of No. 77 on Billboard, No. 57 on Cashbox, and No. 45 on Record World. The album received a positive reception upon its release, but retrospectives were more critical, believing that the albums before and after were much stronger compared to Time, Time.

== Background ==
In late 1966, Ames had his breakout with the Easy Listening chart topping single "My Cup Runneth Over, which also reached No. 8 on the Hot 100, after that he recorded his most successful album with the same name, which peaked at No. 4 on the Billboard Top LPs.

Right after those he recorded Time, Time (Tu As Beau Sourire), which also topped the AC chart, but didn't do as well on the Hot 100, peaking at No. 61, so with that continued success, he recorded another album, and like last time, with the same name as the single, but scrapped the French.

== Reception ==
=== Contemporary ===
Record World put it in its "Albums of the Week" section, writing, "Currently one of the hottest male record sellers, Ed Ames tags this new package of romantic ballads after his 'Time, Time' single." Cashbox magazine said that Ames' "exhibits a romantic style which should do much to insure the success of the package."

=== Retrospective ===
Professional ratings
Review scores
| Source | Rating |
|---|---|
| AllMusic | 2.5/5 stars |
| The Encyclopedia of Popular Music | 2/5 stars |

Retrospectives were mixed. The Encyclopedia of Popular Music gave the album a two-star rating, meaning that the album was "flawed". AllMusic's editors rated it half-a-star higher. Their Greg Adams stated that "As exemplary as the arrangements and Ames' performances may be, the material could be better, and Time, Time is inferior to both My Cup Runneth Over and the album Ames would make next, When the Snow Is on the Roses."

== Chart performance ==
The album debuted on the Billboard Top LPs chart in the issue dated July 8, 1967, peaking at No. 77 during a thirty-eight week run on it. It entered the Cashbox Top 100 Albums chart in the issue dated June 24, 1967, peaking at a higher No. 57 during a thirteen-week run on it. Time, Time entered the Record World 100 Top LP's chart in the issue date July 1, 1967, reaching No. 45 during a twelve-week run on it.

The title track was released by RCA Victor as the lead single in April 1967. It entered the Billboard Hot 100 in May 1967, peaking at No 61. "Time, Time" debuted on the Billboard Easy Listening at the same time, but topped the chart during its fifteen-week run on it. On the Cashbox Top 100 Singles, the song climbed to No. 66 during its five-week run on the chart.

== Track listing ==
Side 1
| No. | Title | Writer(s) | Musical/Film | Length |
|---|---|---|---|---|
| 1. | "Time, Time (Tu As Beau Sourire)" | Michel Fugain, Pierre Delanoë, Norman Gimbel | — | 2:50 |
| 2. | "Michelle" | John Lennon, Paul McCartney | — | 3:20 |
| 3. | "Pretend" | Lew Douglas, Cliff Parman, Frank Levere | — | 2:33 |
| 4. | "Somethin' Stupid" | C. Carson Parks | — | 2:24 |
| 5. | "Here with You" | Robert Allen | Cock-A-Doodle Don't | 2:42 |
| 6. | "Cabaret" | John Kander, Fred Ebb | Cabaret | 3:25 |

Side 2
| No. | Title | Writer(s) | Musical/Film | Length |
|---|---|---|---|---|
| 1. | "One Little Girl at a Time" | Hal David, Neal Hefti | Oh Dad, Poor Dad | 2:31 |
| 2. | "Wish Me a Rainbow" | Mack David, Jerry Livingston | This Property Is Condemned | 2:36 |
| 3. | "Love That Lasts Forever" | James Last, Eddie Snyder, Larry Kusik | — | 3:13 |
| 4. | "Sunrise, Sunset" | Jerry Bock, Sheldon Harnick | Fiddler on the Roof | 3:19 |
| 5. | "What the World Needs Now Is Love" | Burt Bacharach, Hal David | — | 2:54 |
| Total length: | | | | 30:47 |

== Production ==
- Recorded at: RCA Victor's Music Center of the World, Hollywood, California and Webster Hall, New York City.

== Charts ==
Chart peaks for Time, Time
| Chart (1967) | Peak position |
|---|---|
| US Billboard Top LPs | 77 |
| US Cashbox Top 100 Albums | 57 |
| US Record World 100 Top LP's | 45 |

== Personnel ==
All credits are adapted from the liner notes of Time, Time.

- Ed Ames – vocals
- Jim Foglesong – producer
- Anita Kerr, (tracks: A5, B3) – arranger, conductor
- Marty Gold, (tracks: A4, A6, B5) – arranger, conductor
- Perry Botkin, Jr., (tracks: A1, B1) – arranger, conductor
- Ray Ellis, (tracks: A2, A3, B2, B4) – arranger, conductor
- Dick Bogert – recording engineer
- Ed Begley – recording engineer
- Hank Cicalo – recording engineer
- Joan Crosby – liner notes

== Release history ==
Release history and formats for Time, Time
| Region | Date | Format | Label | Ref. |
|---|---|---|---|---|
| United States | June 1967 | LP; Vinyl | RCA Victor | |
| United States | August 1967 | 8-track cartridge tape | RCA Victor | |
| Canada | June 1967 | LP; Vinyl | RCA Victor | |
| Australia | Circa 1969 | LP; Vinyl | RCA Victor | |
| Worldwide | Circa 2020 | Music download; streaming | Sony Music Entertainment | |
