= List of Billboard Easy Listening number ones of 1967 =

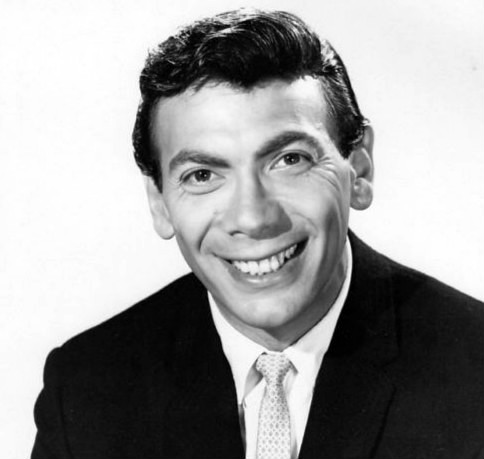
Ed Ames had three number ones in 1967.

In 1967, Billboard magazine published a chart ranking the top-performing songs in the United States in the easy listening market. The listing has undergone various name changes and since 1996 has been published under the title Adult Contemporary. In 1967, 18 songs topped the chart, which at the time was entitled Easy Listening, based on playlists submitted by easy listening radio stations and sales reports submitted by stores.

On the first chart of 1967, Frank Sinatra was at number one with "That's Life", which had been in the top spot since the previous week. Sinatra, who was experiencing a career resurgence in his 50s, had the highest total number of weeks at number one by an artist in 1967, spending seven weeks in the top spot with the solo singles "That's Life" and "The World We Knew (Over and Over)" and a further nine weeks at number one with "Somethin' Stupid", a duet with his daughter Nancy. The nine weeks which "Somethin' Stupid" spent at the top was the longest unbroken run of the year at number one. The song was also a crossover success, topping Billboard's pop music chart, the Hot 100, for four weeks. In addition to Frank Sinatra, Ed Ames also had three Easy Listening number ones in 1967, reaching the top spot with "My Cup Runneth Over", "Time, Time" and "When the Snow Is on the Roses". Nancy Sinatra, Al Martino and Herb Alpert & the Tijuana Brass were the only other acts with multiple chart-toppers during the year.

In contrast to the song by the Sinatras which was both an easy listening and pop number one, both "It's Such a Pretty World Today" by Andy Russell and "Cold" by John Gary were Easy Listening chart-toppers but did not achieve sufficient crossover success to chart on the Hot 100 at all. It would be more than 30 years before another song would top the Easy Listening/Adult Contemporary listing but fail to register on the Hot 100 despite being eligible to do so. Russell's chart-topper came just two months after a recording of the same song by Wynn Stewart had reached number one on the Hot Country Singles chart. "Cold" was the final number one of the year and would prove to be Gary's only Easy Listening chart-topper; after it exited the Easy Listening chart he never achieved another entry on either that listing or the Hot 100.

== Chart history ==
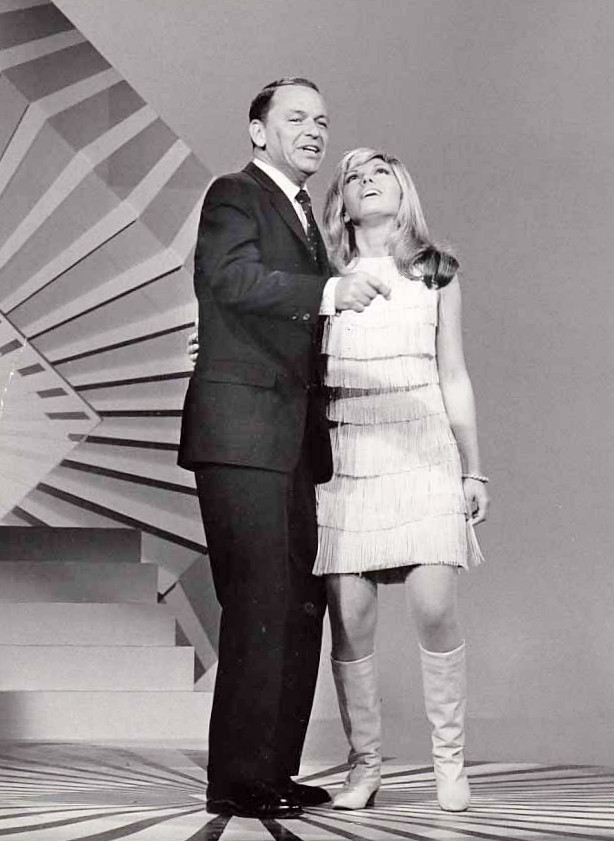
Father-daughter duo Frank and Nancy Sinatra spent nine consecutive weeks at number one with "Somethin' Stupid".

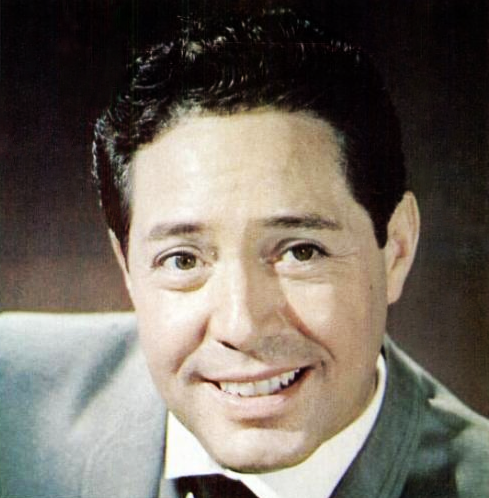
"It's Such a Pretty World Today" was a chart-topper for Andy Russell. Although it was an Easy Listening number one, it did not enter the Hot 100 at all.

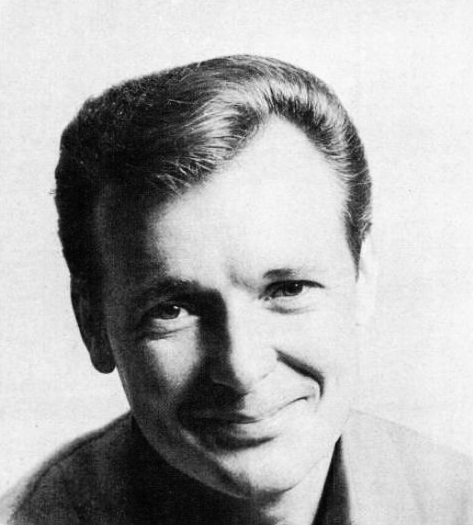
John Gary ended the year at number one with the song "Cold". It was the second song of 1967 to top the Easy Listening chart but fail to enter the Hot 100.

Key
†	Indicates number one on Billboard's year-end easy listening chart for 1967

Issue date	Title	Artist(s)	Ref.
January 7	"That's Life"	Frank Sinatra	
January 14	"That's Life"	Frank Sinatra	
January 21	"Sugar Town"	Nancy Sinatra	
January 28	"Sugar Town"	Nancy Sinatra	
February 4	"My Cup Runneth Over"	Ed Ames	
February 11	"My Cup Runneth Over"	Ed Ames	
February 18	"My Cup Runneth Over"	Ed Ames	
February 25	"My Cup Runneth Over"	Ed Ames	
March 4	"Lady"	Jack Jones	
March 11	"Lady"	Jack Jones	
March 18	"Lady"	Jack Jones	
March 25	"Lady"	Jack Jones	
April 1	"Somethin' Stupid" †	Nancy Sinatra and Frank Sinatra	
April 8	"Somethin' Stupid" †	Nancy Sinatra and Frank Sinatra	
April 15	"Somethin' Stupid" †	Nancy Sinatra and Frank Sinatra	
April 22	"Somethin' Stupid" †	Nancy Sinatra and Frank Sinatra	
April 29	"Somethin' Stupid" †	Nancy Sinatra and Frank Sinatra	
May 6	"Somethin' Stupid" †	Nancy Sinatra and Frank Sinatra	
May 13	"Somethin' Stupid" †	Nancy Sinatra and Frank Sinatra	
May 20	"Somethin' Stupid" †	Nancy Sinatra and Frank Sinatra	
May 27	"Somethin' Stupid" †	Nancy Sinatra and Frank Sinatra	
June 3	"Casino Royale"	Herb Alpert & the Tijuana Brass	
June 10	"Casino Royale"	Herb Alpert & the Tijuana Brass	
June 17	"Time, Time"	Ed Ames	
June 24	"Stop! And Think It Over"	Perry Como	
July 1	"Mary in the Morning"	Al Martino	
July 8	"Mary in the Morning"	Al Martino	
July 15	"Don't Sleep in the Subway"	Petula Clark	
July 22	"Don't Sleep in the Subway"	Petula Clark	
July 29	"Don't Sleep in the Subway"	Petula Clark	
August 5	"It's Such a Pretty World Today"	Andy Russell	
August 12	"In the Chapel in the Moonlight"	Dean Martin	
August 19	"In the Chapel in the Moonlight"	Dean Martin	
August 26	"In the Chapel in the Moonlight"	Dean Martin	
September 2	"The World We Knew (Over and Over)"	Frank Sinatra	
September 9	"The World We Knew (Over and Over)"	Frank Sinatra	
September 16	"The World We Knew (Over and Over)"	Frank Sinatra	
September 23	"The World We Knew (Over and Over)"	Frank Sinatra	
September 30	"The World We Knew (Over and Over)"	Frank Sinatra	
October 7	"A Banda (Ah Bahn-da)"	Herb Alpert & the Tijuana Brass	
October 14	"A Banda (Ah Bahn-da)"	Herb Alpert & the Tijuana Brass	
October 21	"It Must Be Him"	Vikki Carr	
October 28	"It Must Be Him"	Vikki Carr	
November 4	"It Must Be Him"	Vikki Carr	
November 11	"More Than the Eye Can See"	Al Martino	
November 18	"More Than the Eye Can See"	Al Martino	
November 25	"When the Snow Is on the Roses"	Ed Ames	
December 2	"When the Snow Is on the Roses"	Ed Ames	
December 9	"When the Snow Is on the Roses"	Ed Ames	
December 16	"When the Snow Is on the Roses"	Ed Ames	
December 23	"Cold"	John Gary	
December 30	"Cold"	John Gary	
