= Chippewa Town =

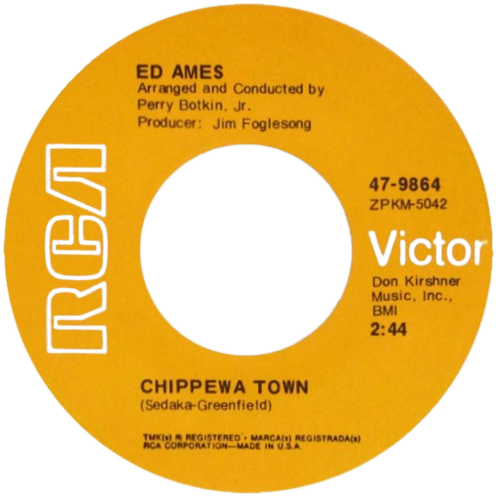
- 1970 vinyl record for commercial use

Single by Ed Ames
- B-side: "Sing Away the World"
- Released: June 1970
- Studio: RCA's Music Center of the World, Hollywood, California
- Genre: Folk-pop; easy listening; country
- Length: 2:44
- Label: RCA Victor
- Songwriters: Howard Greenfield; Neil Sedaka
- Producer: Jim Foglesong

Ed Ames singles chronology
"Think Summer" (1970)	"Chippewa Town" (1970)	"Sweet, Sweet Reason" (1970)

"Chippewa Town" is a 1970 song written by Howard Greenfield and Neil Sedaka. It was most notably performed by Ed Ames, who released it as a single in mid 1970. His version reached the US adult-oriented charts and received a positive reception. Another version was released by actor Lon Satton in April 1971.

== Background and release ==
American singer Ed Ames enjoyed brief pop success in 1967 and 1968, charting several singles. As sales decreased he switched his style to message songs in 1969 with "Changing, Changing" and the LP A Time for Living, a Time for Hope. In mid 1970 Ames changed his song style again, choosing Sedaka's "Chippewa Town" for his next single. The song was noted by critics as "offer[ing] a contemporary semi-folk glimpse of the present state of the redman." Before the Indian-themed song, Ames had already acted in a few shows with the same topic, notably 1964's Daniel Boone.

The single was produced by Jim Foglesong, and arranged by Perry Botkin Jr.. The B-side written by Barry Mann and Andy Badale became the title track for his subsequent album Sing Away the World, while "Chippewa Town" remained a non-album track. The song received programming from easy listening and country radio stations in the summer of 1970, and was a pick for adult-oriented stations.

== Critical reception ==
Professional ratings
Review scores
Source	Rating
Billboard	Positive (Spotlight)
Cashbox	Positive (Pick of the Week)
Record World	Positive (Sleeper of the Week)

The single received a positive critical reception upon its release. Cashbox believed that the single was "Right in line with the Indian image he has presented on TV." Record World put the single in its "Sleepers of the Week" section, saying that "Ames sings about American Indian life", and that the "star will do well with this song". They said that it "is sure to add some new fans to his already vast following." Billboard magazine stated that "Potent ballad material from the pen of Neil Sedaka and Howard Greenfield is served up in an exceptional and commercial performance by Ames." They believed that there was "Much sales and chart potential here!"

== Chart performance ==
"Chippewa Town" became a minor easy-listening success while missing the pop charts. It entered the Billboard Easy Listening chart in the issue dated June 27, 1970, reaching number 36 during a three-week run on it. It debuted on the Record World Top Non-Rock chart in the issue dated July 18, 1970, peaking at number 33 during a one-week appearance on it. It was his final charting single.

== Charts ==
Chart peaks for "Chippewa Town" by Ames
Chart (1970)	Peak position
US Billboard Easy Listening	36
US Record World Top Non-Rock	33
