= Christmas with Ed Ames =

Studio album by Ed Ames
- Released: August 1967
- Studio: Webster Hall
- Genres: Pop; Holiday
- Length: 30:39
- Label: RCA Victor
- Producer: Jim Foglesong

Ed Ames chronology
Time, Time (1967)	Christmas with Ed Ames (1967)	When the Snow Is on the Roses (1967)

Singles from Christmas with Ed Ames
- 1. "Let It Snow! Let It Snow! Let It Snow!" Released: November 1968

Christmas with Ed Ames is a studio album by American pop singer Ed Ames. It was released in August 1967 via RCA Victor and was the eighth studio album of his solo singing career. The album contained 11 Christmas songs, including traditional carols and popular standards. The album received a positive critical reception and managed to chart in both December 1967 and 1968. A promotional single was released from the album in 1968: "Let It Snow! Let It Snow! Let It Snow!".

== Background and recording ==
Ed Ames was a popular vocalist during the late 1960s. In 1967, after his success with hits like "My Cup Runneth Over" and "Time, Time", his label urged him to cut a Christmas album. The songs for Christmas with Ed Ames were recorded in the summer at Webster Hall, located in New York City. All of them were produced by Jim Foglesong. Arrangements were provided by two conductors, Marty Gold and Frank Hunter, both of whom Ames recorded for the first time. Ames was accompanied by a chorus, as was usual for Christmas albums.

== Release and content ==
RCA Victor first released the album in August 1967, as a long play record. Christmas with Ed Ames was among seven new Christmas albums Victor issued in 1967. In September 1968, it was also made available as an 8-track cartridge. A month later, it was released as an LP in Australia for the first time. RCA reissued the album in 1973 on their subsidiary label Camden, retitling it to Do You Hear What I Hear, and changing the order of the songs on side one of the LP. It was again reissued on November 21, 2011 in a two-fer CD by Real Gone Music alongside Christmas is the Warmest Time of the Year (1970). Decades later, the album was re-released for streaming to digital sites.

The album had one new song titled "The Ballad of the Christmas Donkey". Three songs were credited as traditional: "Deck the Halls", "O Come, All Ye Faithful", and "The First Noel". Only one song was fully pop, the 1945 "Let It Snow! Let It Snow! Let It Snow!", the second most recently written track on the album. The arrangements themselves varied from a cappella passages to more swinging brass-filled ones. Ames later personally stated that he thought it was one of his best albums.

== Critical reception ==
=== Contemporary reviews ===
The album received a positive critical reception upon its release. Billboard magazine noted that it "is a delightful time with appropriate combination of traditional and standard seasonal fare," adding "...but Ames also expressively sings such carols as 'The First Noel,' 'Do You Hear What I Hear' and 'O Come, All Ye Faithful.'" Cashbox magazine stated that Ames "sings of a joyous Christmas that should please all those in search of one. 'The Ballad of the Christmas Donkey,' 'Heard the Bells On Christmas Day,' 'Do You Hear What I Hear,' and 'Joy To The World' are among the better tracks."

== Chart performance and singles ==
Christmas with Ed Ames successfully reached the top-40 of the US Christmas LP's chart published by Billboard magazine. It debuted on the chart in the issue dated December 9, 1967, peaking at No. 11 during a four-week run on it. In December 1968, the album peaked at No. 12 also during a four-week run on the chart. That year in November, two songs were taken from the album to form a promotional single. "Let It Snow! Let It Snow! Let It Snow!" and "The Ballad of the Christmas Donkey" were released by RCA Records with the catalogue number SP-45-188.

== Track listing ==
Side one
No.	Title	Writer(s)	Length
1.	"Deck the Halls"	Traditional	2:18
2.	"Let It Snow! Let It Snow! Let It Snow!"	Sammy Cahn; Jule Styne	2:28
3.	"O Come, All Ye Faithful"	Traditional	2:58
4.	"Away in a Manger"	Martin Luther	2:21
5.	"Do You Hear What I Hear"	Gloria Shayne Baker; Noel Regney	2:45
6.	"Joy to the World"	George Frideric Handel; Isaac Watts	1:58
Total length:			14:48

Side two
No.	Title	Writer(s)	Length
1.	"The Ballad of the Christmas Donkey"	Carol Hall	2:16
2.	"Sweet Little Jesus Boy"	Robert MacGimsey	3:30
3.	"I Wonder as I Wander"	John Jacob Niles; L. H. Horton	4:18
4.	"I Heard the Bells on Christmas Day"	Henry Wadsworth Longfellow; Johnny Marks	2:04
5.	"The First Noel"	Traditional	3:43
Total length:			15:51

== Charts ==
Chart peaks for Christmas with Ed Ames
Chart (1967)	Peak position
US Billboard Christmas LP's	11
Chart (1968)	Peak position
US Billboard Christmas LP's	12

== Personnel ==
All credits are adapted from the liner notes of Christmas with Ed Ames.

- Ed Ames – vocals
- Frank Hunter – arranger, conductor (tracks: A3–A5, B1–B5)
- Marty Gold – arranger, conductor (tracks: A1, A2, A6)
- Jim Foglesong – producer
- Ed Begley – recording engineer

== Release history ==
Release history and formats for Christmas with Ed Ames
Region	Date	Format	Label	Ref.
North America	August 1967	LP; Vinyl	RCA Victor	
Norway	November 1967	LP; Vinyl	RCA Victor	
United States	September 1968	8-track cartridge tape	RCA Victor	
Australia	October 1968	LP; Vinyl	RCA Victor	
North America	Late 1973	LP; Vinyl; Reissue	RCA Camden	
United States	November 21, 2011	Compact disc	Real Gone Music	
Worldwide	Circa 2020	Music download; streaming	Sony Music Entertainment	
