= Leave Them a Flower =

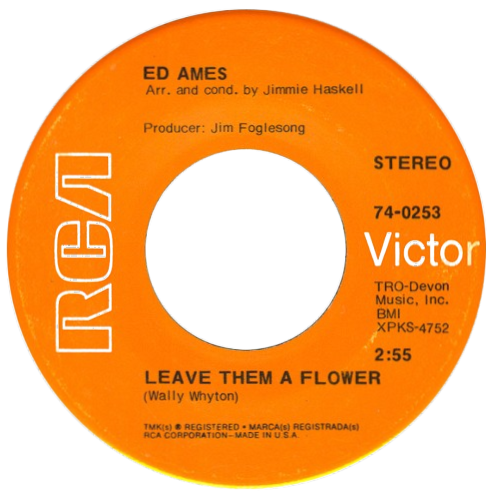

Single by Ed Ames

from the album Love of the Common People
- B-side: "(The) Love of the Common People"
- Released: September 1969
- Studio: RCA's Music Center of the World, Hollywood, California
- Genre: Pop; easy listening
- Length: 2:55
- Label: RCA Victor Records
- Songwriter: Wally Whyton
- Producer: Jim Foglesong

Ed Ames singles chronology
"Think Summer" (1969)	"Leave Them a Flower" (1969)	"A Thing Called Love" (1969)

"Leave Them a Flower" is a 1969 song written by Wally Whyton. It was most notably performed by Ed Ames, who released it as a single in late 1969. His version reached the US and Canadian adult-oriented charts and received positive-to-mixed reception. The lyrics were noted by critics for preserving nature for future generations. Whyton released his own version a few years later.

== Background and release ==
American singer Ed Ames enjoyed brief pop success in 1967 and 1968, charting several songs in the top-100 of charts. As sales decreased he switched his style to message songs in 1969 with "Changing, Changing" and the LP A Time for Living, a Time for Hope. In late 1969 Ames would try do repeat the theme with Wally Whyton's "Leave Them a Flower". The song was noted by critics as being a "flower-power ballad". The single was produced by Jim Foglesong, and arranged by Jimmie Haskell on the A-side and by Al Capps on the B-side "(The) Love of the Common People". It became the title track for his subsequent album Love of the Common People, with both tracks included.

== Critical reception ==
Professional ratings
Review scores
Source	Rating
Record World	4/5 stars
Cashbox	Positive (Pick of the Week)

The single received a positive critical reception upon its release. Cashbox believed that "Futurism in the '2525' mold but with a vocal power and a traditional folk melody to supply drive behind a more positive comment on tomorrow." They called it a "Very fine side that packs a production impetus which could spark pop explosions." Record World gave the single a four-star rating and said that "This is a super-dramatic production to set off Ed's big big voice, and the message will hit home." They said that it "is sure to add some new fans to his already vast following." Retrospectively, on the other hand, Greg Adams on AllMusic believed that the song "might have gone over well on a television variety show in 1969, but on record it wears thin fast and bears an unfortunate resemblance to the worst of Jim Nabors."

== Chart performance ==
Trade ad made by RCA Records for the single.

"Leave Them a Flower" became an easy-listening success while missing the pop charts. It entered the Billboard Easy Listening chart in the issue dated October 25, 1969, reaching number 19 during a five-week run on it. It debuted on the Record World Top-Non Rock chart in the issue dated November 1, 1969, peaking at number 16 during a five-week run as well. "Leave Them a Flower" achieved less adult contemporary success in Canada, where it was ranked at number 33 on the RPM Adult Contemporary survey. It was his final top-20 on the American adult-oriented charts.

== Charts ==
Chart performance for "Leave Them a Flower" by Ames
Chart (1969)	Peak position
US Billboard Easy Listening	19
US Record World Top-Non Rock	16
Canadian RPM Adult Contemporary	33
