= Love of the Common People (disambiguation) =

"Love of the Common People" is a 1970 song by John Hurley and Ronnie Wilkins.

Love of the Common People may also refer to:

- Love of the Common People (Waylon Jennings album), 1967
- Love of the Common People (Ed Ames album), 1969
