= Sings Apologize =

Studio album by Ed Ames
- Released: July 1968
- Studios: RCA's Music Center of the World, Hollywood, California
- Genre: Pop
- Label: RCA Victor
- Producer: Jim Foglesong

Ed Ames chronology
Who Will Answer? (1968)	Sings Apologize (1968)	The Hits of Broadway and Hollywood (1968)

Singles from Sings Apologize
- 1. "Apologize" Released: April 1968

Sings Apologize is a studio album by American pop singer Ed Ames. It was released in July 1968 via RCA Victor and was the eleventh studio album of his career. Sings Apologize contained 11 tracks, including the namesake single "Apologize", which reached the top-10 of the Billboard Easy Listening and the top-80 of the Billboard Hot 100 charts. The album received positive reviews from several contemporary publications and became another charting release for Ames, reaching No. 135 on the Billboard Top LP's chart and No. 87 on both the Cashbox and Record World album charts.

== Background and recording ==
Ed Ames had been a recording artist for RCA Victor since the 1950s, when he was with the Ames Brothers. In 1966, his solo career took off with the chart-topping hit "My Cup Runneth Over". He continued to have hit singles and best-selling albums, signing a new long-term contract with RCA Victor in June 1968. The songs for Sings Apologize were recorded at RCA's Music Center of the World, located in Hollywood, California. All of them were produced by Jim Foglesong. Arrangements were provided by Claus Ogerman and Perry Botkin Jr..

== Content and release ==
Most of its tracks were covers of songs that made America's Billboard pop music chart. This included Roger Williams' "Born Free, Bobby Hebb's "Sunny", Simon & Garfunkel's "Scarborough Fair", Bobby Goldsboro's "Honey", and Andre Popp's "Love Is Blue". "Apologize" was an Ames original and was chosen as the title track. "The Color of Snow" was an Ames original as well, and was later featured on his The Best of Ed Ames compilation the following year. "Elvira" was a ballad adapted into a song by David Carroll with lyrics by Hank Cochran.

Sings Apologize was originally released in July 1968 by RCA Victor in the United States. The label offered it as a vinyl LP, with six songs on "Side A" and five songs on "Side B". In a few weeks, the label made it available on an 8-track cartridge format as well. In September 1968, it was released in Canada. Sings Apologize was available both in mono and stereo sound. It was the eleventh studio album of Ames's career, and also the second of the year. Decades later, the album was re-released for streaming to digital sites.

== Critical reception ==
Professional ratings
Review scores
Source	Rating
AllMusic	2.5/5 stars
The Encyclopedia of Popular Music	3/5 stars
Billboard	Positive "Star Performer"
Cashbox	Positive "Pop Pick"

The album received a positive critical reception upon its release. Billboard magazine stated that "this Ed Ames package also packs power with some favorites like 'Honey,' 'Sunny' and 'Love Is Blue.'" They believed that "Two other tunes that will help sell this album are 'Scarborough Fair' and 'Thirty Days Hath September.'" The Memphis Press-Scimitar stated that "The master of moods, Ed Ames lends his rich baritone to a jazzed-up version of 'Sunny', 'Apologize', and 'Love Is Blue'". They believed that "The latter seems to be written with Ames in mind".

Putting the album in its "Pop Picks" section, Cashbox magazine noted that "the chanter offers a vocal version of the 'Elvira Madigan' theme and a pretty ballad, 'The Color Of Snow,'" calling to "Expect heavy airplay and sales" on the album. The Anaheim Bulletin believed that Ames "will never need to apologize for that performance", they described the tunes as "big, all the way to the wire".

== Chart performance and singles ==
Sings Apologize would reach the US album charts in the late summer, though its performance on them varied. It debuted on Billboard magazine's Top LP's chart in the issue dated August 10, 1968, peaking at No. 135 during a fourteen-week run on the chart. The album entered Cashbox magazine's Top 100 Albums chart in the issue dated July 27, 1968, peaking at No. 87 during a nine-week run on it. It debuted on the Record World 100 Top LP's chart in the issue dated August 3, 1968, peaking at No. 87 as well, during a shorter six-week run on it.

One lead single was included on Sings Apologize. "Apologize" was first released by RCA Victor as a single in April 1968. It became a top-10 single on America's Billboard Easy Listening chart, and reached the pop top-80 as well. In Canada, the single reached number 47.

== Track listing ==
Side one
No.	Title	Writer(s)	Length
1.	"Travelin' Band"	Kessler; Kemp	2:13
2.	"After All the Loves of My Life"	Webb	2:30
3.	"The Color of Snow"	Jones; Green	2:26
4.	"Apologize"	Griffin; Z. Gordon	2:02
5.	"Scarborough Fair/Canticle"	Simon & Garfunkel	3:27
6.	"Born Free"	Black; Barry	2:06

Side two
No.	Title	Writer(s)	Length
1.	"Sunny"	Hebb	3:09
2.	"Love Is Blue"	Popp; Blackburn	2:44
3.	"Elvira"	Cochran; Carroll	2:26
4.	"Honey"	Russell	3:47
5.	"Thirty Days Hath September"	Krondes; Jacobson	2:17

== Charts ==
Chart peaks for Sings Apologize
Chart (1968)	Peak position
US Billboard Top LP's	135
US Cashbox Top 100 Albums	87
US Record World 100 Top LP's	87

== Release history ==
Release history and formats for Sings Apologize
Region	Date	Format	Label	Ref.
United States	July 1968	LP Mono; LP Stereo	RCA Victor Records	
United States	July 1968	8-track cartridge tape	RCA Victor Records	
Canada	September 1968	LP Mono; LP Stereo	RCA Victor Records	
New Zealand	Late 1968	LP Mono; LP Stereo	RCA Victor Records	
Worldwide	Circa 2020	Music download; streaming	Sony Music Entertainment	

== Personnel ==
All credits are adapted from the liner notes of Sings Apologize.

- Ed Ames – vocals
- Jim Foglesong – producer
- Claus Ogerman – arranger, conductor
- Perry Botkin Jr. – arranger, conductor
- Mickey Crofford – recording engineer
