= Sings the Songs of Bacharach and David =

Studio album by Ed Ames
- Released: January 1971
- Studios: RCA's Music Center of the World, Hollywood, California
- Genre: Pop
- Length: 30:57
- Label: RCA Victor
- Producer: Jim Foglesong

Ed Ames chronology
Sing Away the World (1970)	Sings the Songs of Bacharach and David (1971)	Ed Ames (1972)

Sings the Songs of Bacharach and David is a studio album by American singer and actor Ed Ames released in early 1971. It was his first tribute album, released by RCA Victor Records. It contained a total of 11 tracks. The album received a positive critical reception following its release, and reached the US album charts.

== Background, recording and content ==
Ed Ames had been a recording artist for RCA Victor since the 1950s, during his time with the Ames Brothers. In 1966, his solo career took off with the chart-topping hit "My Cup Runneth Over". He continued to have hit singles and best-selling albums, though by the 1970s, sales had heavily decreased. To combat this, he would release a tribute for Burt Bacharach and Hal David, who were some of the most popular songwriters at the time. Like his previous release, the album was produced by Jim Foglesong and recorded at RCA's Music Center of the World, located in Hollywood, California.

Sings the Songs of Bacharach and David consisted of 11 tracks in total. Ten of the tracks were popular songs by the songwriting duo, with several coming from movies and musicals. One new track by them was featured, "How Does a Man Become a Puppet". "Nikki" was originally recorded by Ames in late 1967 for his album When the Snow Is on the Roses. It was the first recorded version of the song with lyrics.

== Release and chart performance ==
Sings the Songs of Bacharach and David was originally released in early January 1971 by RCA Victor. It was the eighteenth studio album of Ames' career. The label originally offered it as a vinyl LP, with six songs on "Side A" and five songs on "Side B". It was only available in stereo sound. Since then, it has been digitized onto streaming platforms in the 2020s as well.

Sings the Songs of Bacharach and David debuted on Billboard magazine's Top LP's chart in the issue dated February 20, 1971, peaking at No. 199 during a one-week run on the chart. It became his final charting release.

== Critical reception ==
Professional ratings
Review scores
Source	Rating
The Virgin Encyclopedia of Popular Music	3/5 stars
Billboard	Positive (Pop Pick)
Cashbox	Positive (Pop Best Bet)

The album was given a positive review from Billboard magazine following its original release. Putting the album in its "Pop" section, the publication stated that "Ames' powerful, wondrously romantic style is the perfect ticket for these Bacharach-David tunes. He captures all the cleverness and imagination of the lyrics and melody." They described the arrangements as "grand". The Columbus Ledger described the album as a "winner" and believed that Ames' "treatment of the score of 'Lost Horizon' is great", highlighting the same two tracks. Cashbox believed that "It now seems inevitable that singer Ed Ames should choose to present a complete album of the songs of Burt Bacharach and Hal David," calling it a "solid MOR set that all of Ed's many fans will want."

== Track listing ==
Side one
No.	Title	Writer(s)	Length
1.	"Make It Easy on Yourself"	Burt Bacharach; Hal David	3:09
2.	"Nikki"	Bacharach; David	2:22
3.	"(They Long to Be) Close to You"	Bacharach; David	3:03
4.	"Do You Know the Way to San Jose"	Bacharach; David	2:45
5.	"The Look of Love"	Bacharach; David	2:46
6.	"Wives and Lovers"	Bacharach; David	2:45
Total length:			16:50

Side two
No.	Title	Writer(s)	Length
1.	"Alfie"	Bacharach; David	3:03
2.	"What the World Needs Now Is Love"	Bacharach; David	3:15
3.	"How Does a Man Become a Puppet"	Bacharach; David	2:45
4.	"Raindrops Keep Fallin' on My Head"	Bacharach; David	2:21
5.	"I Say a Little Prayer"	Bacharach; David	2:43
Total length:			13:27

== Charts ==
Chart peaks for Sings the Songs of Bacharach and David
Chart (1971)	Peak position
US Billboard Top LP's	199

== Release history ==
Region	Date	Format	Label	Ref.
North America	January 1971	LP Stereo	RCA Victor Records	
Worldwide	Circa 2020	Music download; streaming	Sony Music Entertainment	

== Personnel ==
All credits are adapted from the liner notes of Sings the Songs of Bacharach and David.

- Ed Ames – vocals, liner notes
- Jimmie Haskell, (tracks: A1, A4, A6, B1, B3, B5) – arranger, conductor
- Larry Muhoberac, (tracks: A3, B2) – arranger, conductor
- Perry Botkin Jr., (tracks: A2, A5, B4) – arranger, conductor
- Jim Foglesong – producer
- Amy R. Lehman – art direction
- Mickey Crofford – recording engineer
- John Norman – recording engineer
- Pete Abbott – recording engineer
