= Songs from "Lost Horizon" and Themes from Other Movies =

Studio album by Ed Ames
- Released: December 1972
- Studios: RCA's Music Center of the World, Hollywood, California
- Genre: Pop
- Length: 32:10
- Label: RCA Victor
- Producer: Joe Reisman

Ed Ames chronology
Remembers Jim Reeves (1972)	Songs from "Lost Horizon" and Themes from Other Movies (1972)

Singles from Songs from "Lost Horizon" and Themes from Other Movies
- 1. "Lost Horizon" Released: September 1972; 2. "Butterflies Are Free" Released: January 1973

Songs from "Lost Horizon" and Themes from Other Movies is a studio album by American singer and actor Ed Ames released in 1972. It became his final recorded album for RCA Victor Records. It contained a total of 10 tracks, including two singles. The album received a positive critical reception following its release, though it missed the US album charts.

== Background, recording and content ==
Ed Ames had been a recording artist for RCA Victor since the 1950s, during his time with the Ames Brothers. In 1966, his solo career took off with the chart-topping hit "My Cup Runneth Over". He continued to have hit singles and best-selling albums, though by the 1970s, sales had heavily decreased. Like his previous release, the album was produced by Joe Reisman and recorded at RCA's Music Center of the World, located in Hollywood, California. Songs from "Lost Horizon" and Themes from Other Movies consisted of 10 tracks in total. All of the tracks were from popular movies of the early 1970s, the most recent of which were Lost Horizon and Butterflies Are Free. Most popular selections included "Where Do I Begin", "Speak Softly, Love" and "Living Together, Growing Together", the latter being a big pop hit for soul group 5th Dimension during this time.

== Release and singles ==
Trade ad made by RCA Records for the album.

Songs from "Lost Horizon" and Themes from Other Movies was originally released in December 1972 by RCA Victor. It was the twenty-first studio album of Ames' career, and the third that year. The label originally offered it as a vinyl LP, with five songs on "Side A" and five songs on "Side B", the latter being completely made up of songs from Lost Horizon. It was only available in stereo sound. Since then, it has been digitized onto streaming platforms in the 2020s as well.

Two lead singles were included on Songs from "Lost Horizon" and Themes from Other Movies. The title track "Lost Horizon" was first released by RCA Victor as a single in September 1972. "Butterflies Are Free" was taken from the album and released in January 1973 both as a promo record and a single. The single was recommended for radio stations by reviewers from Record World and Billboard music industry trade magazines at the time. The singles themselves failed to reach the charts.

== Critical reception ==
Professional ratings
Review scores
Source	Rating
Billboard	Positive (Pop Pick)

The album was given a positive review from Billboard magazine following its original release. Putting the album in its "Pop" section, the publication stated that "There is no denying that Ed Ames is still the possessor of one of the most exhilarating voices of this or any other era." They believed that "The rich, resonant feel that he imbues to every song should bring response and appreciation from his many adherents." They highlighted the tracks "Living Together, Growing Together," and "The World Is a Circle." The Calgary Albertan described the album as a "winner" and believed that Ames' "treatment of the score of 'Lost Horizon' is great", highlighting the same two tracks.

== Track listing ==
Side one
No.	Title	Writer(s)	Length
1.	"Butterflies Are Free" (from the Columbia Pictures' Release Butterflies Are Free)	Gershe; Schwartz	3:10
2.	"Micol's Theme" (from The Garden of the Finzi-Continis)	Brooks	4:15
3.	"The Summer Knows" (Theme from the Warner Bros. Film Summer of '42)	A. Bergman; M. Bergman; Legrand	2:23
4.	"Speak Softly Love" (Love Theme from the Paramount Picture The Godfather)	Kusik; Rota	3:01
5.	"Where Do I Begin" (from the Paramount Picture Love Story)	Sigman; Lai	3:10
Total length:			15:59

Side two
No.	Title	Writer(s)	Length
1.	"The World Is a Circle" (from Lost Horizon)	Bacharach; David	3:25
2.	"Living Together, Growing Together" (from Lost Horizon)	Bacharach; David	3:00
3.	"Question Me an Answer" (from Lost Horizon)	Bacharach; David	2:55
4.	"Reflections" (from Lost Horizon)	Bacharach; David	3:21
5.	"Lost Horizon" (from Lost Horizon)	Bacharach; David	3:30
Total length:			16:11

== Release history ==
Region	Date	Format	Label	Ref.
North America	December 1972	LP Stereo	RCA Victor Records	
Worldwide	Circa 2020	Music download; streaming	Sony Music Entertainment	

== Personnel ==
All credits are adapted from the liner notes of Songs from "Lost Horizon" and Themes from Other Movies.

- Ed Ames – vocals
- The Jimmy Joyce Children's Chorus, (track: B1) – vocals
- Bill Reddie, (tracks: A2, A4, A5, B1, B3, B5) – arranger, conductor
- Perry Botkin Jr., (tracks: A1, A3, B2, B4) – arranger, conductor
- Joe Reisman – producer
- Jean Nagy – photography
- Amy R. Lehman – art direction
- Mickey Crofford – recording engineer
