= I Do! I Do! =

Musical with a book and lyrics by Tom Jones and music by Harvey Schmidt

- Music: Harvey Schmidt
- Lyrics: Tom Jones
- Book: Tom Jones
- Basis: Jan de Hartog play The Fourposter
- Productions: 1966 Broadway; 1969 Australia; 1969 Norway; 1982 US Television; 1996 Off-Broadway revival

I Do! I Do! is a musical with a book and lyrics by Tom Jones and music by Harvey Schmidt which is based on the Jan de Hartog play The Fourposter. The two-character story spans 50 years, from 1895 to 1945, as it focuses on the ups and downs experienced by Agnes and Michael throughout their marriage. The set consists solely of their bedroom, dominated by the large fourposter bed in the center of the room.

== History ==
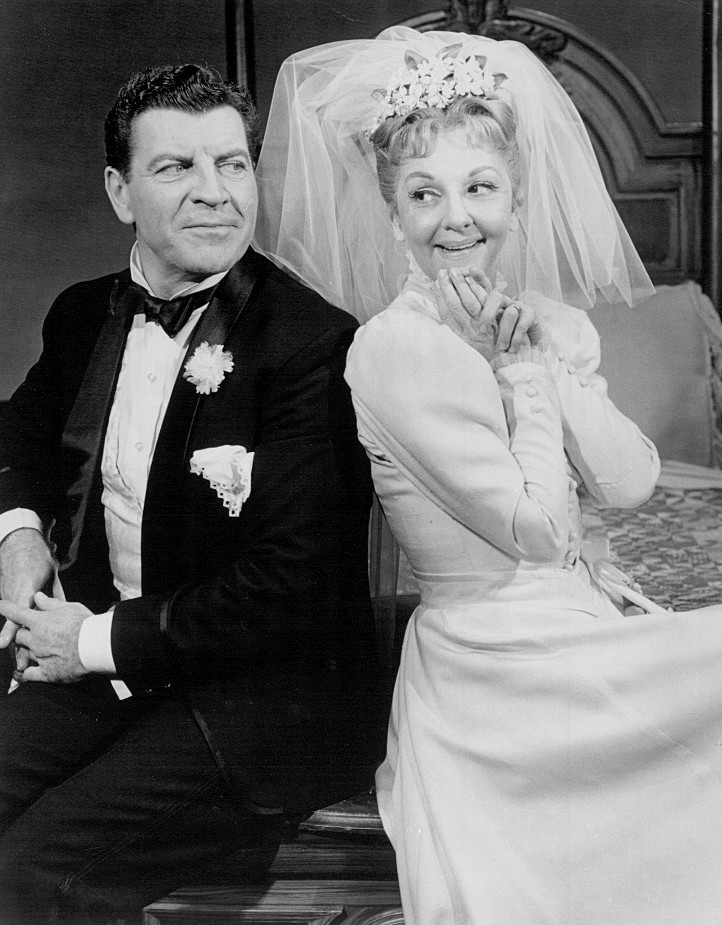
Robert Preston and Mary Martin

For producer David Merrick, who initially presented the play on Broadway, I Do! I Do! was an ideal investment in that it had neither expensive sets and costumes nor a large cast. After four previews, the Broadway production, directed and choreographed by Gower Champion, opened on December 5, 1966, at the 46th Street Theatre and closed on June 15, 1968, after 560 performances. Mary Martin and Robert Preston were in the original cast. Carol Lawrence and Gordon MacRae played matinees starting in October 1967. and then replaced Martin and Preston in December 1967. Also that month, the play was at the Concord Theater in Cape Girardeau, Missouri with actor Kenny Hulshoff and actress Betty Proffer in the roles.

Martin and Preston starred in a national tour, originally scheduled to play 27 cities for one year, starting in March 1968 in Rochester, New York. However, in February 1969 Martin became ill and the remainder of the tour was cancelled. Carol Burnett and Rock Hudson also starred in a national tour, appearing during Burnett's hiatus from her television show in 1973 and again in 1974 at The Muny, St. Louis, Missouri and in Dallas.

The Australian production starring Jill Perryman and Stephen Douglass presented by J. C. Williamson's premiered at the Theatre Royal, Sydney on February 15, 1969. It subsequently toured to Her Majesty's Theatre, Adelaide from May 17, 1969, and Her Majesty's Theatre, Melbourne from June 21, 1969. In 1993 Jill Perryman reprised her performance alongside her husband Kevan Johnston at Old Brisbane Hotel, Perth from November 11 to December 18.

A film adaptation, with a screenplay by Champion and starring Julie Andrews and Dick Van Dyke, was announced by United Artists in 1969, but the commercial failure of several expensive movie musicals around this time and waning interest in musical films in general, led UA to scrap the film in the spring of 1970. In 1981, the musical was seen by audiences at the Apple Dinner Theater in Sarasota, Florida. A television version produced by Archer King with Lee Remick and Hal Linden was broadcast in 1982.

A 1996 Off-Broadway revival at the Lamb's Theatre was directed by Will Mackenzie and starred Karen Ziemba and David Garrison. It ran for 52 performances.

I Do! I Do! is a popular production of regional and amateur theatre across the United States and Canada, because of the minimal cost of mounting it. A production at the Chanhassen Dinner Theatre in Chanhassen, Minnesota ran for more than 20 years with leads David Anders and Susan Goeppinger, who eventually married during their run. This set the American record for a play running with the original cast.

== Synopsis ==
Act One

A bedroom, complete with four-poster bed, chaise longue and easy chair. There are two dressing tables downstage on either side. Michael and Agnes sit at the tables, getting dressed for their wedding. They finish their makeup and don their wedding apparel. They move through the ceremony, complete with Agnes throwing the flowers and the two going out into the audience to shake hands and welcome guests. Finally, Michael carries Agnes back across the threshold and they fall into the bed ("Prologue").

Agnes' feet hurt. Michael removes her shoe and kisses her foot. Agnes protests; a little drunk, a little weepy and very nervous. Michael professes his belief that they were married in a former life, and his sweetness makes her cry. We get a glimpse of the Michael that we will soon get to know when he ruins her happy moment by pointing out to her that she should go ahead and cry, as her youth is over. They nervously and elaborately prepare for the wedding night. They climb clumsily into bed and pull the covers back to find, to their horror, a pillow embroidered with the words, "God Is Love." Michael awkwardly turns out the light. They say goodnight to each other, and Agnes admits that she's never seen a naked man ("Goodnight"). There is an uncomfortable silence. Finally, they kiss and embrace passionately.

A spotlight comes up on Michael, sitting on the lip of the stage. He stretches and smiles and tells the audience a surprising secret: contrary to conventional wisdom, he actually loves his wife ("I Love My Wife"). He wakes her and they dance together. He falls asleep, and she puts the "God Is Love" pillow under his head, tucks him in and kisses him. The music becomes soft and tender as Agnes straightens the room. She folds his clothes and puts them away, gets the robe that is hanging at her dressing area and slips into a new outfit. We see that she is very, very pregnant. She ruminates on impending motherhood ("Something Has Happened").

In the following blackout, we hear an old-fashioned, hand-rung bell as Michael calls for Agnes. He is in bed with a washcloth on his head as she enters – still hugely pregnant – pushing a bassinet. Michael is having sympathetic labor pains and is very needy and upset. He already feels displaced by the baby to come. Sitting on his lap, Agnes goes into labor. As Michael goes for the doctor, they promise to each other that they will never let anything happen to their relationship.

Lights come up on Michael pacing, worrying and praying that his wife and baby survive ("The Waiting Room"). All is well; Michael has a son. He tosses cigars into the audience. Agnes enters, pulling a clothesline strung with diapers and baby clothes. Michael now realizes that he has a family for whom he needs to provide ("Love Isn't Everything"). Agnes then has a girl. Now Michael knows that he really needs to make money. Despite the stress, love isn't everything... but makes it all worth it. The tension between Agnes and Michael starts to become palpable. Michael has become very self-involved and self-important about his work and success as a novelist. He treats her as a lowly domestic as he lectures the audience on writers and writing, themes and works. She interrupts him in the middle of his diatribe and calls his work dull. He corrects her grammar, criticizes her cooking and habitual lateness, insisting that she accompany him to literary parties at which she feels uncomfortable. She counters that she also has a list of irritating habits ("Nobody's Perfect").

They return from the party and argue bitterly. He admits to having an ongoing affair with a younger woman. He blames Agnes for driving him away. He also points out that everyone knows that men get better with age and women get worse ("A Well Known Fact"). Agnes exits in disgust, and Michael finishes the song, making a fast, showy exit, a matinee idol in all his glory. In response to Michael having criticized her shopping habits, Agnes starts parading the extravagant items on her dressing table. She fantasizes about what her life would be like if she were a saucy, single divorcee, partying the night away ("Flaming Agnes").

Michael reappears to finish their discussion. She tells him to get out; he refuses, since, he claims, it is his house and his mortgage. She resolves to leave, taking the checkbook with her. He begins throwing her things into a suitcase: her alarm clock, her nightgown, her cold cream and the "God Is Love" pillow. Their eyes are now wide open about each other... and it isn't pleasant ("The Honeymoon Is Over").

She stalks out, with her ermine thrown over her nightgown, with the Flaming Agnes set determinedly on her head. He waits for a moment, certain of her return. When she doesn't come back, he rushes after her. We hear a struggle and he reappears, dragging her into the room. They fight and he throws her on the bed. His anger dissipates. Looking at her pleadingly, he tells her of his loneliness and regret. Her eyes fill with tears and she acknowledges that no one is perfect ("Finale – Act I"). They lie together and embrace.

Act Two

Agnes and Michael are in bed, celebrating New Year's Eve. The "God Is Love" pillow is gone, as is the gaudy chandelier. Time has passed; their children are teenagers now, celebrating at New Year's Eve parties of their own. Agnes and Michael are getting older ("Where Are the Snows?"). Michael is angry that their son hasn't returned and goes downstairs to wait for him. He storms back into the room, having found bourbon in his son's room. They argue about parenting, and Michael takes a swig from the bottle, only to discover that their son has filled the bottle with the cod liver oil that his mother thought she was administering for three years. We hear that, offstage, Michael has confronted his son at the door with the razor strap, only to discover that his boy is a man, dressed in his father's tuxedo.

Michael and Agnes reflect on the dreams and regrets of their early married years. Agnes asks Michael if he is disappointed. He is not ("My Cup Runneth Over"). They fantasize about their children growing up and moving out. They make plans for their middle age and retirement: he'll finally finish his Collected Tolstoy; she'll cruise to Tahiti and learn to do the hootchi-koo; he'll play the saxophone, she the violin ("When the Kids Get Married").

Later, Michael is dressing with little success for his daughter's wedding. He is not pleased with his little girl's choice of husband ("The Father of the Bride"). Agnes enters, crying. The stained glass window appears again, and Michael and Agnes watch the ceremony. They wave to the departing couple and go home to face an empty nest.

Agnes faces her transition to middle age. She doesn't know what to be now that her children no longer need her as much ("What Is a Woman?"). Michael enters the scene with two packages, but Agnes announces that she's going away; she doesn't love Michael anymore. She feels that he neither understands nor appreciates her, and reveals her infatuation with a young poet. Michael confesses his love and concern for his wife. He shows her that he loves her, and she breaks down, laughing and crying at once. He gives her a charm bracelet with a charm for each of them, one for each of their children and room for many grandchildren. She feels much better. They dance together and multi-colored ribbons cascade from above ("Someone Needs Me").

The music changes, becomes softer and more carousel-like as, together, they pick up the boxes and papers. They begin to pack up the house ("Roll up the Ribbons"). The music continues as they go to their dressing tables and apply old-age makeup, wigs and whiten their hair. It's eight a.m., and the much older Michael and Agnes are moving to a smaller apartment. They are gathering the last bits and pieces to take along with the movers. He pulls out a steamer trunk and finds the "God Is Love" pillow. Agnes wants to leave the pillow for the newlyweds who have bought the house, but Michael refuses. He was mortified to find it on their wedding night and won't have another young groom traumatized. Agnes sends Michael to look for a bottle of champagne and sneaks the pillow back under the covers. Michael returns with the champagne, but they determine that they won't drink it, since it is too early. They look at each other across the bed and remember what a good life they've had ("This House – Finale").

They take a last look around and leave the room together. Michael comes back in for the champagne and finds the "God Is Love" pillow under the covers. He puts it on Agnes' side of the bed and the champagne on his side before exiting. The curtain falls on the home.

== Song list ==
Act I

- All the Dearly Beloved - Michael and Agnes
- Together Forever - Michael and Agnes
- I Do! I Do! - Michael and Agnes
- Good Night - Michael and Agnes
- I Love My Wife - Michael
- Something Has Happened - Agnes
- My Cup Runneth Over - Michael and Agnes
- Love Isn't Everything - Michael and Agnes
- Nobody's Perfect - Michael and Agnes
- A Well Known Fact - Michael
- Flaming Agnes - Agnes
- The Honeymoon Is Over - Michael and Agnes

Act II

- Where Are the Snows - Michael and Agnes
- When the Kids Get Married - Michael and Agnes
- The Father of the Bride - Michael
- What Is a Woman - Agnes
- Someone Needs Me - Michael and Agnes
- Roll up the Ribbons - Michael and Agnes
- This House - Michael and Agnes

== Recordings ==
The original cast album was released by RCA Victor (LOC/LSO-1128). Ed Ames had a major hit with his recording of the song "My Cup Runneth Over", released on an album of the same title.

== Critical response ==
In his review for The New York Times, Walter Kerr wrote that the stars were "great." Martin has "several funny little vocal tricks...and always...with that mellow sound that comes from her throat like red wine at room temperature." Preston is "at his untouchable best when the show asks him to be pompous, and blissfully obtuse." The work of the director is noted: "Then, courtesy of Gower Champion, there are all those engaging things the two do together...one of them is literally the soft-shoe to end all soft-shoes, because it is done with no shoes at all." Kerr also wrote that the material was "on the whole barely passable, a sort of carefully condensed time capsule of all the cliches that have ever been spawned by people married and/or single...the lyrics are for the most part remarkably plain-spoken." In reviewing the new cast of Carol Lawrence and Gordon MacRae, Clive Barnes wrote in The New York Times that they "exerted a certain charm." The musical is "very slight indeed ... Carol Lawrence was more than [Martin's] equal. She did the younger scenes with less cuteness and her acting had a depth unusual in a musical. Mr. MacRae...has a better if more conventional voice." Judith Ann Crow of the Southeast Missourian wrote, "I Do! I Do! proves the point delightfully." Continuing with her review, "The Hulshoff and Proffer voices are unusually good, carrying well into the nether parts of the Concord".

== Awards and nominations ==
=== Original Broadway production ===
Year	Award	Category	Nominee	Result	Ref.
1967	Tony Award	Best Musical		Nominated	
1967	Tony Award	Best Lyricist and Composer	Tom Jones and Harvey Schmidt	Nominated	
1967	Tony Award	Best Performance by a Leading Actor in a Musical	Robert Preston	Won	
1967	Tony Award	Best Performance by a Leading Actress in a Musical	Mary Martin	Nominated	
1967	Tony Award	Best Direction of a Musical	Gower Champion	Nominated	
1967	Tony Award	Best Scenic Design	Oliver Smith	Nominated	
1967	Tony Award	Best Costume Design	Freddy Wittop	Nominated	

=== 1996 Off-Broadway revival ===
Year	Award	Category	Nominee	Result	Ref.
1996	Drama Desk Award	Outstanding Actor in a Musical	David Garrison	Nominated	
1996	Drama Desk Award	Outstanding Actress in a Musical	Karen Ziemba	Nominated	
