= Ed Ames (album) =

Studio album by Ed Ames
- Released: January 1972
- Studios: RCA's Music Center of the World, Hollywood, California
- Genre: Pop
- Length: 32:37
- Label: RCA Victor
- Producer: Joe Reisman

Ed Ames chronology
Sings the Songs of Bacharach and David (1971)	Ed Ames (1972)	Remembers Jim Reeves (1972)

Singles from Ed Ames
- 1. "And I Love You So" Released: March 1972

Ed Ames is a self-titled studio album by American singer and actor Ed Ames released in early 1972. It became his nineteenth recorded album for RCA Victor Records. It contained a total of 10 tracks, including one lead single. The album received a positive critical reception following its release, though it missed the US album charts.

== Background, recording and content ==
Ed Ames had been a recording artist for RCA Victor since the 1950s, during his time with the Ames Brothers. In 1966, his solo career took off with the chart-topping hit "My Cup Runneth Over". He continued to have hit singles and best-selling albums, though by the early 1970s, sales had heavily decreased. The self-titled LP was Ames' first to be produced by Joe Reisman, and was recorded at RCA's Music Center of the World, located in Hollywood, California.

Ed Ames consisted of 10 tracks in total. Selections included recent pop hits like "And I Love You So" and "I Am... I Said", country hits like "Take Me Home, Country Roads", and musical songs such as the standard "Sunrise, Sunset" and "Summer of '42". Other songs included "Bless the Beasts & Children," "Desiderata," "One Tin Soldier," and "The Night They Drove Old Dixie Down", the latter being a big pop hit for singer Joan Baez during this time.

== Release and singles ==
Ed Ames was originally released in January 1972 by RCA Victor. It was the nineteenth studio album of Ames' solo career. The label originally offered it as a vinyl LP, with five songs on "Side A" and five songs on "Side B". It was only available in stereo sound. Since then, it has been digitized onto streaming platforms in the 2020s as well.

One lead single was included on Ed Ames. The track "And I Love You So" written by Don McLean was first released by RCA Victor as a single in March 1972. The flip was a non-album song titled "The Ship". The single was recommended for radio stations by reviewers from Billboard music industry trade magazine at the time. The single itself failed to reach the charts.

== Critical reception ==
Professional ratings
Review scores
Source	Rating
Billboard	Positive (Pop Pick)

The album was given a positive review from Billboard magazine following its original release. Putting the album in its "Pop" section, the publication stated that "lending his beautiful style and great voice to some of the hits of today, Ed Ames has a package here that will drive a big one for 1972. " They believed that it was a "magnificent LP!" They highlighted the tracks "Bless the Beasts & Children," "Loving Her Was Easier," and "One Tin Soldier." The Odessa American said that Ames' "latest album runs the gamut," and believed that he had a "strong take" on "Take Me Home, Country Roads".

== Track listing ==
Side one
No.	Title	Writer(s)	Length
1.	"Take Me Home, Country Roads"	Bill Danoff; Taffy Nivert; John Denver	3:03
2.	"The Summer Knows"	Alan Bergman; Marilyn Bergman; Michel Legrand	2:23
3.	"I Am... I Said"	Neil Diamond	3:11
4.	"Lovin' Her Was Easier (than Anything I'll Ever Do Again)"	Kris Kristofferson	3:06
5.	"One Tin Soldier"	Dennis Lambert; Brian Potter	3:34
Total length:			15:17

Side two
No.	Title	Writer(s)	Length
1.	"Bless the Beasts & Children"	Barry De Vorzon; Perry Botkin Jr.	2:56
2.	"And I Love You So"	Don McLean	3:52
3.	"The Night They Drove Old Dixie Down"	Robbie Robertson	3:20
4.	"Sunrise, Sunset"	Jerry Bock; Sheldon Harnick	3:13
5.	"Desiderata"	Fred Werner	3:59
Total length:			17:20

== Release history ==
Region	Date	Format	Label	Ref.
North America	January 1972	LP Stereo	RCA Victor Records	
Worldwide	Circa 2020	Music download; streaming	Sony Music Entertainment	

== Personnel ==
All credits are adapted from the liner notes of Ed Ames.

- Ed Ames – vocals
- Perry Botkin Jr. – arranger, conductor
- Joe Reisman – producer
- Ivan Nagy – photography
- Mickey Crofford – recording engineer
