= A Time for Living, a Time for Hope =

Studio album by Ed Ames
- Released: February 1969
- Studio: RCA's Music Center of the World, Hollywood, California
- Genre: Pop
- Label: RCA Victor; LSP-4128
- Producer: Jim Foglesong

Ed Ames chronology
The Hits of Broadway and Hollywood (1968)	A Time for Living, a Time for Hope (1969)	The Windmills of Your Mind (1969)

Singles from A Time for Living, a Time for Hope
- 1. "Changing, Changing" Released: February 1969

A Time for Living, a Time for Hope is a studio album by American pop singer Ed Ames. It was released in February 1969 via RCA Victor and was the thirteenth studio album of his career. A Time for Living, a Time for Hope contained 11 tracks split on two sides, including the single "Changing, Changing", which reached the top-15 of the Billboard Easy Listening and the top-10 of the RPM Adult Contemporary charts. The album received positive reviews from several contemporary publications and became another charting release for the singer.

== Recording and content ==
The songs were recorded at RCA's Music Center of the World, located in Hollywood, California. All of them were produced by Jim Foglesong. Some of its tracks were covers of songs that made America's Billboard pop music chart. This included Louis Armstrong's "What a Wonderful World", and Simon & Garfunkel's "The Sound of Silence", Trini Lopez's "If I Had a Hammer (the Hammer Song)". "Changing, Changing" was written by Sheila Davis who wrote Ames' hit protest song "Who Will Answer?". "Six Words" was also an Ames original, originally the flip for the lead single for the album. "If I Can Help Somebody" was a popular song from 1945, first recorded by Turner Layton. Other tracks included pop folk renditions of "Peaceful Waters", "I Believe", and "Just a Drop of Rain".

== Release ==
A Time for Living, a Time for Hope was originally released in February 1969 by RCA Victor in multiple territories. It was the thirteenth studio album of Ames's career, and also the first of the year. The label originally offered it as a vinyl LP, with six songs on "Side A" and five songs on "Side B". The following month, the label made it available on an 8-track cartridge format. Decades later, the album was re-released for streaming to digital sites.

== Critical reception ==
The album was given a positive review from Record World magazine following its original release. The publication noted that "Ames, who has a robust and straightforward voice, sings a collection of inspirational songs. This package will have great meaning for many buyers; 'The Sound of Silence,' 'If I Can Help Somebody,' 'If I Had a Hammer.'" The Daily Breeze compared the album to his previous Who Will Answer? release, and they noted that Ames is "sincere in his delivery and comes through effectively on each song."

Other reviews were positive as well. Billboard magazine stated that "If songs and a singer were all that was needed to make a better world then Ed Ames would be the singer and this repertoire would be the songs. Ames has a strong vocal sell and the songs are meaningful and pertinent." They believed that "The songs contain a message for our time and Ames delivers it expertly and effectively." Cashbox said that "The singer's warm, rich voice has captured and held the attention of thousands of fans, and none of them will be disappointed by his performance here."

== Chart performance and singles ==
A Time for Living, a Time for Hope successfully reached the US pop album charts, though its presence on them varied. It debuted on Billboard magazine's Top LP's chart in the issue dated March 8, 1969, peaking at No. 114 during a fourteen-week run on the chart. The album entered Cashbox magazine's Top 100 Albums chart in the issue dated April 26, 1969, peaking at No. 91 during a nine-week run on it. The album achieved its highest peak on the 100 Top LP's chart published by Record World, reaching No. 84.

One lead single was included on A Time for Living, a Time for Hope. "Changing, Changing" was first released by RCA Victor as a single in early February 1969. It became a top-15 single on America's Billboard adult contemporary chart, rising to the number 11 position. In Canada, the single received more airplay and climbed to the number 6 position on the RPM Adult Contemporary chart.

== Track listing ==
Side one
No.	Title	Writer(s)	Length
1.	"Changing, Changing"	Davis	3:19
2.	"Somewhere"	Bernstein; Sondheim	2:00
3.	"If I Had a Hammer (the Hammer Song)"	Hays; Seeger	2:35
4.	"Peaceful Waters"	Lightfoot	3:27
5.	"What a Wonderful World"	Weiss; Douglas	2:38
6.	"If I Can Dream"	W. Earl Brown	2:50

Side two
No.	Title	Writer(s)	Length
1.	"If I Can Help Somebody"	Bazelandrozzo	3:16
2.	"The Sound of Silence"	Simon	3:09
3.	"Six Words"	Jones; Green	2:40
4.	"Just a Drop of Rain"	Snyder; Kusik	2:42
5.	"I Believe"	Drake; Graham; Shirl; Stillman	2:00

== Charts ==
Chart peaks for A Time for Living, a Time for Hope
Chart (1969)	Peak position
US Billboard Top LP's	114
US Cashbox Top 100 Albums	91
US Record World 100 Top LP's	84

== Personnel ==
All credits are adapted from the liner notes of A Time for Living, a Time for Hope.

- Ed Ames – vocals
- Jim Foglesong – producer
- George Tipton, (tracks: A2, B5) – arranger, conductor
- Perry Botkin Jr., (tracks: A1, A3 to A6, B1 to B3) – arranger, conductor
- Sammy Lowe, (tracks: B4) – arranger, conductor
- Fred Seligo – photography
- Tom Tucker – photography
- Ed Begley – engineer
- Mickey Crofford – engineer

== Release history ==
Release history and formats for A Time for Living, a Time for Hope
Region	Date	Format	Label	Ref.
North America	February 1969	LP; Vinyl	RCA Victor	
United States	March 1969	8-track cartridge tape	RCA Victor	
Australia	June 1969	LP; Vinyl	RCA Victor	
Worldwide	Circa 2020	Music download; streaming	Sony Music Entertainment	
