= Love of the Common People (Ed Ames album) =

Studio album by Ed Ames
- Released: November 1969
- Studios: RCA's Music Center of the World, Hollywood, California
- Genres: Pop; easy listening; country pop; vocal
- Length: 37 minutes and 29 seconds
- Label: RCA Victor
- Producer: Jim Foglesong

Ed Ames chronology
The Best of Ed Ames (1969)	Love of the Common People (1969)	Sing Away the World (1970)

Singles from Love of the Common People
- 1. "Leave Them a Flower" Released: September 1969; 2. "A Thing Called Love" Released: November 1969

Love of the Common People is a studio album by American pop singer Ed Ames. It was released in November 1969 via RCA Victor and was the fifteenth studio album of his career. Love of the Common People contained 11 tracks, including two singles, "Leave Them a Flower" and "A Thing Called Love", both of which reached the top-25 of the Billboard Easy Listening chart. Other tracks included recent pop and country hits, and were noted for their lyrics by critics. The album received positive reviews from several contemporary publications, though retrospectives were mixed. Love of the Common People itself only managed to reach No. 172 on the US Top LP's chart published by Billboard magazine.

== Background and recording ==
Ed Ames had been a recording artist for the RCA Victor label since the 1950s, while in the Ames Brothers vocal group. In 1966, his solo career took off with the hit "My Cup Runneth Over". He had several hit singles and best-selling albums, but as chart performance declined, Ames switched to message-oriented material such as A Time for Living, a Time for Hope in early 1969. He continued with the theme, by covering pop songs with "uplifting" lyrics. The songs for Love of the Common People were recorded at RCA's Music Center of the World, located in Hollywood, California. All of them were produced by Jim Foglesong. A total of four arrangers were recruited for the LP, including Jimmie Haskell who would continue working with Ames the following years.

== Content and release ==
Most of its tracks were covers of songs that made America's Billboard pop music chart. This included Herb Alpert's "This Guy's in Love with You", Roger Miller's "Little Green Apples", James South's "Games People Play", and Jackie DeShannon's "Put a Little Love in Your Heart". The project included three original songs as well; "Today Is the First Day of the Rest of Our Lives", "Bound for Glory (El Camino Real)", and "Leave Them a Flower" were all recorded by Ames first. The songs were noted for all having a message and meaning, with critics noting the "flower-power" theme the album carried.

Love of the Common People was originally released in November 1969 by RCA Victor. It was the fifteenth studio album of Ames's career, and also the third and final of the year. The label originally offered it as a vinyl LP, with six songs on "Side A" and five songs on "Side B". By June 1970, the album was available on LP, 8-track cartridge, and cassette formats. Decades later, the album was re-released for streaming to digital sites.

== Critical reception ==
Professional ratings
Review scores
Source	Rating
AllMusic	1.5/5 stars
The Encyclopedia of Popular Music	3/5 stars

=== Contemporary reviews ===
The album was given a positive review from Cashbox magazine following its original release. The publication noted that "Ed Ames' many fans should be mightily pleased with the chanter's latest album effort. The ace songster really puts his all into this one, and most of the songs on the LP have a message." They believed that it "should be on the charts soon". The Press-Telegram believed that on Love of the Common People Ames was "on top form". They stated that he was "always the consummate 'pro', he gives out with 11 soothing, sophisticated offerings on affectionate themes". Billboard magazine said that "This latest by Ames, whose 'Best of' is currently climbing the Top LP's chart, contains a number of songs whose spiritually uplifting lyrics are warmly interpreted." They stated that "His recent easy listening hit, 'Leave Them a Flower,' is reprised, and his version of 'Little Green Apples' is among the strongest versions of this contemporary classic." They noted, "Also notable are his current singles, 'Thing Called Love,' 'Today Is the First Day of the Rest of Our Lives', and the title song."

=== Retrospective reviews ===
In a retrospective review, Greg Adams of AllMusic wrote that "commercial desperation drove Ames to create the misbegotten mess that is Love of the Common People. Ames' trained baritone crooning 'Let's Get Together' and Wally Whyton's 'Leave Them a Flower' might have gone over well on a television variety show in 1969, but on record it wears thin fast and bears an unfortunate resemblance to the worst of Jim Nabors." He highlighted that "the mismatch between the singer and the songs is a serious problem." He concluded that the song "A Thing Called Love" "holds up to Ames' faux hipster treatment and is about the only bright spot on the album." On the other hand, The Encyclopedia of Popular Music gave the album a three-star rating, which meant that the album was "recommended" and "good" by the artist's standard.

== Chart performance and singles ==
Love of the Common People debuted on Billboard magazine's Top LP's chart in the issue dated January 3, 1970, peaking at No. 172 during a six-week run on the chart. The album failed to reach the charts of other publications, such as Cashbox and Record World, however, Cashbox later referred to it as a "steady selling LP" in June 1970.

Two singles were included on Love of the Common People. "Leave Them a Flower" was first released by RCA Victor as a single in late September 1969. It became a top-20 single on America's Billboard Adult Contemporary chart, rising to the number 19 position. To kickstart the album's sales, two songs were taken from it to form a new single, with it being released concurrently with the album in late November. "A Thing Called Love" managed to reach the number 21 position on the Adult Contemporary charts in America, and the number 20 position on the Canadian RPM Top Adult Songs chart.

== Track listing ==
Side one
No.	Title	Writer(s)	Length
1.	"Let's Get Together"	Chet Powers	4:11
2.	"Today Is the First Day of the Rest of Our Lives"	Byron Walls	3:21
3.	"Put a Little Love in Your Heart"	Jackie DeShannon; Jimmy Holiday; Randy Myers	2:32
4.	"(The) Love of the Common People"	John Hurley; Ronnie Wilkins	3:18
5.	"This Guy's in Love with You"	Burt Bacharach; Hal David	4:15
6.	"A Thing Called Love"	Jerry R. Hubbard	2:45

Side two
No.	Title	Writer(s)	Length
1.	"Leave Them a Flower"	Wally Whyton	2:55
2.	"Bound for Glory (El Camino Real)"	Ernie Sheldon; Jack Keller	3:02
3.	"Little Green Apples"	Bobby Russell	4:21
4.	"Games People Play"	Joe South	3:49
5.	"Lift Every Voice and Sing"	J. W. Johnson; John Rosamond Johnson	3:00

== Charts ==
Chart peaks for Love of the Common People
Chart (1970)	Peak position
US Billboard Top LP's	172

== Personnel ==
All credits are adapted from the liner notes of Love of the Common People.

- Ed Ames – vocals
- Jim Foglesong – producer
- Jimmie Haskell, (tracks: A1, A5, B1 to B3) – arranger, conductor
- Artie Butler, (tracks: A3, B4) – arranger, conductor
- Al Capps, (tracks: A2, A4, A6) – arranger, conductor
- Sid Feller, (tracks: B5) – arranger, conductor
- Mike Salisbury – photography
- Grover Helsley – engineer
- Mickey Crofford – engineer
