= Stop! And Think It Over =

1967 song by Perry Como

Single by Perry Como
- B-side: "How Beautiful The World Can Be"
- Released: April 5, 1967
- Recorded: 1967
- Genre: Traditional Pop
- Length: 2:28
- Label: RCA Victor
- Songwriters: Sid Tepper, Roy C. Bennett
- Producer: Andy Wiswell

Perry Como singles chronology
"Coo Coo Roo Coo Coo Paloma" (1966)	"Stop! And Think It Over" (1967)	"I Looked Back" (1967)

"Stop! And Think it Over" is a 1967 song written by Sid Tepper and Roy C. Bennett, and performed by Perry Como.

== Overview ==
Released as a single, it was the first of three number ones for Como on the Easy Listening chart, spending a single week at the top in June 1967. On the Billboard Hot 100, it reached number ninety-two.

== See also ==
- List of Billboard Easy Listening number ones of 1967
