= Remembers Jim Reeves =

Studio album by Ed Ames
- Released: May 1972
- Studios: RCA's Music Center of the World, Hollywood, California
- Genres: Pop; country-pop
- Label: RCA Victor
- Producer: Joe Reisman

Ed Ames chronology
Ed Ames (1972)	Remembers Jim Reeves (1972)	Songs from "Lost Horizon" and Themes from Other Movies (1972)

Singles from Remembers Jim Reeves
- 1. "Distant Drums" Released: May 1972

Remembers Jim Reeves is a tribute album by American singer Ed Ames to country singer Jim Reeves. It was released in late May 1972 via RCA Victor and was the twentieth studio album of his career. It was also his second-to-last studio album released by RCA Victor. Remembers Jim Reeves contained a total of 10 tracks. Two tracks were originally released as a single. The album was given a positive critical reception following its release.

== Background, recording and content ==
Ed Ames had been a recording artist for RCA Victor since the 1950s, during his time with the Ames Brothers. In 1966, his solo career took off with the chart-topping hit "My Cup Runneth Over". He continued to have hit singles and best-selling albums. Unlike his previous releases, the album was produced by Joe Reisman. Remembers Jim Reeves consisted of 10 tracks in total. All of the tracks were hit songs by well-known American country singer Jim Reeves. The songs varied in popularity, and several were released posthumously following Reeves' death in a plane crash in 1964.

== Release and singles ==
Remembers Jim Reeves was originally released in May 1972 by RCA Victor. It was the twentieth studio album of Ames' solo career. The label originally offered it as a vinyl LP, with five songs on "Side A" and five songs on "Side B". It was only available in stereo sound. Since then, it has been digitilized onto streaming platforms in the 2020s as well.

One lead single was included on Remembers Jim Reeves. "Distant Drums" was first released by RCA Victor as a single in May 1972. Cashbox magazine stated that "The sound of distant drums could very well be announcing a country MOR hit for pop singer Ed Ames, who puts convincing feeling into this slow ballad." The single itself failed to reach the charts.

== Critical reception ==
Professional ratings
Review scores
Source	Rating
AllMusic	3/5 stars
Billboard	Positive (Special Merit Pick)

The album was given a positive review from Billboard magazine following its original release. Putting the album in its "Special Merit" section, the publication stated that "Ed Ames lends his own special style feeling to the classics of the indispensable Reeves." They called it a "strong package", noting that "'He'll Have to Go,' 'Is It Really Over?' 'Anna Marie' and 'Welcome to My World' are all well done." They also characterized "The Blizzard" as a beautiful cut.

The retrospective review by Greg Adams on AllMusic described the album as a "thoroughly respected" tribute, with him saying "Joe Reisman wisely approached the album from a country-pop rather than easy listening direction." He stated that "The subdued pedal steel and sparse accompaniment prevent the end product from seeming schmaltzy or corny, both of which are ever-present dangers when non-country artists cut country records." Adams concluded that "The slightly modernized reading of 'Distant Drums' and Ames' weary recitation on 'The Blizzard' are two highlights."

== Track listing ==
Side one
No.	Title	Writer(s)	Length
1.	"He'll Have to Go"	Allison; A. Allison	2:38
2.	"Adios Amigo"	Livingston; Freed	3:09
3.	"Four Walls"	Moore; Campbell	3:35
4.	"Is It Really Over?"	Reeves	2:15
5.	"The Blizzard"	Howard	3:48

Side two
No.	Title	Writer(s)	Length
1.	"Home"	Miller	2:14
2.	"Distant Drums"	Walker	3:15
3.	"Welcome to My World"	Winkler; Hathcock	2:31
4.	"Anna Marie"	Walker	3:04
5.	"Blue Side of Lonesome"	Payne	2:57

== Release history ==
Region	Date	Format	Label	Ref.
North America	May 1972	LP Stereo	RCA Victor Records	
Worldwide	Circa 2020	Music download; streaming	Sony Music Entertainment	
