= When the Snow Is on the Roses (album) =

Studio album by Ed Ames
- Released: December 1967
- Studios: RCA's Music Center of the World, Hollywood, California; Webster Hall, New York City
- Genres: Pop; Easy listening
- Label: RCA Victor
- Producer: Jim Foglesong

Ed Ames chronology
Christmas with Ed Ames (1967)	When the Snow Is on the Roses (1967)	Who Will Answer? (1968)

Singles from When the Snow Is on the Roses
- 1. "Timeless Love" Released: July 1967; 2. "When the Snow Is on the Roses" Released: September 1967

When the Snow Is on the Roses is a studio album by American pop singer Ed Ames. It was released in December 1967 via RCA Victor and was the ninth studio album of his solo singing career. When the Snow Is on the Roses, titled after the hit song, "When the Snow Is on the Roses", contained 11 tracks, including two singles released earlier that year. Both singles reached the top-5 of the US Billboard Easy Listening chart, and saw brief pop chart appearances. The album received positive reviews from several contemporary publications and climbed to high positions on the charts.

== Background and recording ==
The songs for When the Snow Is on the Roses were recorded at RCA's Music Center of the World, located in Hollywood, California, and at Webster Hall, located in New York City. All of them were produced by Jim Foglesong. Arrangements were provided by a total of three conductors, these include Mort Garson, Ray Ellis, and Perry Botkin Jr.. "Nikki" was the first recorded version of the song with lyrics, originally composed by Burt Bacharach. The song was later included in his 1971 tribute Sings the Songs of Bacharach and David. Other selections included both standards and contemporary material. When the Snow Is on the Roses was originally released in early December 1967 by RCA Victor. It was the ninth studio album of Ames's career, and also his third and final of the year. The label originally offered it as a vinyl LP, with six songs on side one and five songs on side two. Decades later, the album was re-released for streaming to digital sites.

== Critical reception ==
Professional ratings
Review scores
Source	Rating
AllMusic	4/5 stars
The Encyclopedia of Popular Music	3/5 stars

=== Contemporary reviews ===
The album received a positive critical reception upon its release. Billboard magazine noted that "Ed Ames' rich baritone provides pleasant, relaxed listening with such ballads." They highlighted that "He sings 'I'll Get By' with more feeling and sense of the lyric that the standard has received in some time." Cashbox magazine stated that Ames "offers this delightful collection of ballads. Some of the finer efforts on this set are: 'More,' 'Timeless Love,' 'Two For The Road,' 'Let Me So Love,' and 'The Seasons Of Love.'" They believed that the album is "likely to see plenty of spins and sales."

=== Retrospective reviews ===
Greg Adams of AllMusic said in his positive review of the album believed that it "was one of his best sellers and for good reason -- it's full of appealing, melodic songs, none of which are overworn favorites the likes of which fill so many other easy listening vocal albums from this period." He stated that the album "is richly orchestrated without dated production touches and easily sustains the listeners' interest through its course of 11 ballads." Calling "Timeless Love" "lovely", Adams noted that, "tucked away among the album tracks are minor treasures like the sophisticated 'Stranger'" and the light pop of 'Mary in the Morning.'" He concluded that "When the Snow Is on the Roses is a substantial and consistent album that will reward listeners who care to investigate Ames beyond his hits." The Encyclopedia of Popular Music gave the albums a three-star rating, which meant that the album was "recommended" and "good" by the artist's standard.

== Chart performance and singles ==
When the Snow Is on the Roses successfully reached the top-40 of the US pop album charts. It debuted on Billboard magazine's Top LP's chart in the issue dated December 16, 1967, peaking at No. 24 during a twenty-five-week run on the chart. The album debuted on Cashbox magazine's Top 100 Albums chart in the issue also dated December 16, 1967, peaking at No. 22 during a seventeen-week run on it.

Two singles were included on When the Snow Is on the Roses. "Timeless Love" was first released by RCA Victor as a single in July 1967. It became a top-5 single on America's Billboard Easy Listening chart, rising to the number 2 position. "When the Snow Is on the Roses" received a single release in September 1967, it spent two weeks on the Billboard Hot 100 chart, peaking at number 98, returning him to it after "Timeless Love" missed the chart earlier that year. It did better on the Easy Listening charts, and in November through December it topped them at number 1.

== Track listing ==
Side one
No.	Title	Writer(s)	Length
1.	"The Seasons of Love"	Alf Nystrom; Buddy Lambert	3:00
2.	"When the Snow Is on the Roses"	Eddie Snyder; Ernst Bader; James Last; Larry Kusik	2:35
3.	"More" (theme from Mondo Cane)	Nino Oliviero; Riz Ortolani	2:49
4.	"Mary in the Morning"	Johnny Cymbal; Mike Lendel	3:20
5.	"Nikki"	Hal David; Burt Bacharach	2:23
6.	"I'll Get By (As Long as I Have You)"	Roy Turk; Fred Ahlert	2:49

Side two
No.	Title	Writer(s)	Length
1.	"My Love Is Gone from Me"	Andy Badale; Dorothea H. Psalidas Psalidas; Frank Stanton	2:12
2.	"Strangers" (from the TV Production Androcles and the Lion)	Richard Rodgers	2:20
3.	"Timeless Love"	Buffy Sainte-Marie	2:18
4.	"Two for the Road" (from the 20th Century-Fox Film Two for the Road)	Henry Mancini; Leslie Bricusse	2:00
5.	"Let Me So Love"	Livingston-Evans	2:01

== Charts ==
Chart peaks for When the Snow Is on the Roses
Chart (1967–1968)	Peak position
US Billboard Top LP's	24
US Cashbox Top 100 Albums	22
US Record World 100 Top LP's	18

== Personnel ==
All credits are adapted from the liner notes of When the Snow Is on the Roses.

- Ed Ames – vocals
- Jim Foglesong – producer
- Mort Garson, (tracks: A1, B4) – arranger, conductor
- Perry Botkin, Jr., (tracks: A2, A5, B3, B5) – arranger, conductor
- Ray Ellis, (tracks: A3, A4, A6 to B2) – arranger, conductor
- Dick Bogert – recording engineer
- Ed Begley – recording engineer
- John Norman – recording engineer
- Jerry Dantzic – photography
