= The World We Knew (Over and Over) =

Single by Frank Sinatra

from the album The World We Knew
- B-side: "You Are There"
- Released: 1967
- Recorded: 1967
- Genre: Traditional pop
- Length: 2:50
- Label: Reprise
- Songwriter(s): Carl Sigman, Bert Kaempfert, Herbert Rehbein
- Producer(s): Jimmy Bowen

Frank Sinatra singles chronology
"Somethin' Stupid (with Nancy Sinatra)" (1967)	"The World We Knew (Over and Over)" (1967)	"This Town" (1967)

"The World We Knew (Over and Over)" is a song recorded by Frank Sinatra in 1967. It is based on a composition by Bert Kaempfert, a German musician and composer.

The song first appeared on Sinatra's 1967 album The World We Knew and was released as a single later that year. "The World We Knew (Over and Over)" peaked at number thirty on the Billboard Hot 100 chart in September 1967. On the Billboard easy listening chart, it spent five weeks at number one, and was Sinatra's sixth and final single to top that chart.

Charles Aznavour translated the song into French under the title "Un monde avec toi" for Paul Mauriat and Mireille Mathieu . The song was also translated into Italian by Fred Bongusto under the title "Ore D'Amore". Josh Groban covered the song on his album Harmony.

== See also ==
- List of number-one adult contemporary singles of 1967 (U.S.)
