= Who Will Answer? =

Studio album by Ed Ames
- Released: February 1968
- Recorded: 1967–1968
- Studios: RCA's Music Center of the World, Hollywood, California
- Genres: Pop; easy listening
- Label: RCA Victor
- Producer: Jim Foglesong

Ed Ames chronology
When the Snow Is on the Roses (1967)	Who Will Answer? (1968)	Sings Apologize (1968)

Professional ratings
Review scores
Source	Rating
Allmusic	4.5/5 stars

Who Will Answer? (and Other Songs of Our Time) is a 1968 album by pop vocalist Ed Ames. It was recorded and released after the success of its namesake single "Who Will Answer?", which reached the top-10 on adult-oriented and the top-20 on pop charts. It featured a mix of original, but mostly cover songs of contemporary material. The album successfully reached the pop top-15 and went on to receive an RIAA certification for Gold. It features two original songs (the album's hit title track and "Pale Venetian Blind") and nine cover versions of popular songs from the 1960s.

== Release and promotion ==
Who Will Answer? was originally released in February 1968 by RCA Victor in multiple territories. It was the tenth studio album of Ames's career, and also the first of the year. The label originally offered it as a vinyl LP, with six songs on "Side A" and five songs on "Side B". It was available both in mono and stereo sound. At the same time, the label made it available on an 8-track cartridge format. Who Will Answer?, along with several other Ames albums, reportedly received a major advertising push from the label soon after its release. For further promotion, Ames travelled around the country for several performances and in-store visits. One of the highlights was his appearance at the Riviera Hotel in Las Vegas, reported on in Billboard in September 1968. Ames mainly performed album cuts from Who Will Answer?, but focused on telling the audience the "importance of today's music". Decades later, the album was re-released for streaming on digital sites.

== Commercial performance ==
Who Will Answer? successfully reached the US pop record charts. The album entered Cashbox magazine's Top 100 Albums chart in the issue dated February 10, 1968, peaking at No. 12 during a twenty-five-week run on it. It debuted on Billboard magazine's Top LP's chart in the issue dated February 24, 1968, peaking at No. 13 during a fifty-week run on the chart. The album entered the Record World 100 Top LP's chart in the issue dated also February 24, 1968, peaking at No. 13 during a sixteen-week run on it. It was eventually certified Gold by the Recording Industry Association of America for shipments of 500,000 copies on February 17, 1969, his second album to achieve this status.

== Track listing ==
Side one
No.	Title	Writer(s)	Original performer	Length
1.	"Who Will Answer? (Aleluya No. 1)"	Luis Eduardo Aute	Ed Ames (English version)	3:42
2.	"Blowin' in the Wind"	Bob Dylan	Bob Dylan	3:23
3.	"Yesterday"	Lennon–McCartney	The Beatles	2:04
4.	"Monday, Monday"	John Phillips	The Mamas and the Papas	3:14
5.	"Pale Venetian Blind"	Charles M. Jones; Norma Green	Ed Ames	1:51
6.	"Massachusetts"	Barry Gibb; Robin Gibb; Maurice Gibb	Bee Gees	2:18
Total length:				16:32

Side two
No.	Title	Writer(s)	Original performer	Length
1.	"I Wanna Be Free"	Tommy Boyce; Bobby Hart	The Monkees	2:20
2.	"Cherish"	Terry Kirkman	The Association	3:13
3.	"The Other Man's Grass Is Always Greener"	Tony Hatch; Jackie Trent	Petula Clark	2:53
4.	"Can't Take My Eyes Off You"	Bob Crewe; Bob Gaudio	Frankie Valli	2:53
5.	"There's a Kind of Hush (All Over the World)"	Les Reed; Geoff Stephens	Herman's Hermits	2:50
Total length:				14:09

== Production ==
- Recorded at: RCA Victor's Music Center of the World, Hollywood, California.

== Charts ==
Chart peaks for Who Will Answer?
Chart (1968)	Peak position
US Billboard Top LP's	13
US Cashbox Top 100 Albums	12
US Record World 100 Top LP's	13

== Certification ==
Region	Certification	Certified units/sales
United States (RIAA)	Gold	500,000^{^}
^{^} Shipments figures based on certification alone.
