= Sing Away the World =

Studio album by Ed Ames
- Released: June 1970
- Studios: RCA's Music Center of the World, Hollywood, California
- Genre: Pop
- Label: RCA Victor
- Producer: Jim Foglesong

Ed Ames chronology
Love of the Common People (1969)	Sing Away the World (1970)	Christmas is the Warmest Time of the Year (1970)

Singles from Sing Away the World
- 1. "Three Good Reasons" Released: March 1970

Sing Away the World is a studio album by American pop singer Ed Ames. It was released in June 1970 via RCA Victor and was the sixteenth studio album of his career. Sing Away the World contained 11 tracks, including the single "Three Good Reasons", which reached the top-40 of the Billboard Easy Listening chart. The album received positive reviews from several contemporary publications and became one of Ames's final charting releases.

== Background and recording ==
Ed Ames had recorded for RCA Victor since the 1950s as a member of the Ames Brothers vocal group. In 1966, his solo career took off with the hit "My Cup Runneth Over". He had a string of hit singles and best-selling albums, but as chart performance declined he switched to message-oriented recordings such as Love of the Common People (1969). The project was not as commercially successful as hoped for. He subsequently returned to recording love ballads and pop songs. The songs for Sing Away the World were recorded at RCA's Music Center of the World, located in Hollywood, California. All of them were produced by Jim Foglesong. Arrangements were provided by Jimmie Haskell and Perry Botkin Jr..

== Content and release ==
Most of its tracks were covers of songs that made America's Billboard pop music chart. This included Dionne Warwick's "I'll Never Fall in Love Again", Vanity Fare's "Early in the Morning", Simon & Garfunkel's "Bridge over Troubled Water", and B. J. Thomas's "Raindrops Keep Fallin' on My Head". "Sing Away the World" was a new song and was chosen as the title track. "Honey, What's the Matter?" was an Ames original as well. "Adios Amor (Goodbye My Love)" was a ballad written by singer Dusty Springfield.

Sing Away the World was originally released in June 1970 by RCA Victor. It was the sixteenth studio album of Ames's career, and also the first of the year. The label originally offered it as a vinyl LP, with six songs on "Side A" and five songs on "Side B". Decades later, the album was re-released for streaming to digital sites.

== Critical reception ==
The album was given a positive review from Record World magazine following its original release. The publication noted that "Ames with that big, sincere voice of his does right by 'Sing Away the World,' 'Bridge Over Troubled Water,' 'I'll Never Fall in Love Again,' 'What Are You Doing the Rest of Your Life,' 'Until It's Time for You to Go,'" calling it a "Hot album." The Daily Breeze believed that on Sing Away the World "Ames has the emotional quality to project a song, but he also has a great voice. Not many can claim both". They described his voice as "booming" and stated that he continued to take on "new depth" and "feel" with each album.

Billboard magazine said that "Ames has wrapped up another solid package of hit pop songs. He's fit the songs into his own vocal mold and they take on a new and freshly effective meaning." They stated that "He's got a stirring version of 'Bridge Over Troubled Water,' a lilting 'Raindrops Keep Fallin' on My Head' and a romantic 'Two Different Worlds,' which are a sampling of the variety of styles he handles so well here." Santa Barbara News-Press said that Ames is "at his best" on the album, noting that he's "got the power and the range and the quality all displayed".

== Chart performance and singles ==
Sing Away the World debuted on Billboard magazine's Top LP's chart in the issue dated July 11, 1970, peaking at No. 194 during a two-week run on the chart. It was his second-to-last charting album.

One lead single was included on Sing Away the World. "Three Good Reasons" was first released by RCA Victor as a single in March 1970. It became a top-40 single on America's Billboard adult contemporary chart, rising to the number 28 position.

== Track listing ==
Side one
No.	Title	Writer(s)	Length
1.	"Sing Away the World"	Badale; Mann	3:01
2.	"Bridge over Troubled Water"	Simon	3:22
3.	"I'll Never Fall in Love Again"	Bacharach; David	3:03
4.	"Honey, What's the Matter?"	Jones; Green	3:20
5.	"Raindrops Keep Fallin' on My Head"	Bacharach; David	2:15
6.	"Until It's Time for You to Go"	B. St. Marie	3:30

Side two
No.	Title	Writer(s)	Length
1.	"Early in the Morning"	Seago; Leander	3:00
2.	"What Are You Doing the Rest of Your Life?"	A. Bergman; M. Bergman; Legrand	3:04
3.	"Three Good Reasons"	Stephens; Reed	2:55
4.	"Adios Amor (Goodbye My Love)"	Newell; Springfield	2:44
5.	"Two Different Worlds"	Frisch; Wayne	2:55

== Charts ==
Chart peaks for Sing Away the World
Chart (1970)	Peak position
US Billboard Top LP's	194

== Personnel ==
All credits are adapted from the liner notes of Sing Away the World.

- Ed Ames – vocals
- Jim Foglesong – producer
- Jimmie Haskell – arranger, conductor
- Perry Botkin Jr. – arranger, conductor
- Ken Whitmore – photography
- Steve Francisco – technician
