= Who Will Answer? (song) =

1967 single by Ed Ames

Single by Ed Ames

from the album Who Will Answer?
- B-side: "My Love is Gone from Me"
- Released: November 24, 1967
- Recorded: November 11, 1967
- Studio: RCA Victor's Music Center of the World, Hollywood, California
- Genre: Folk rock; Adult contemporary
- Length: 3:42
- Label: RCA Victor
- Songwriters: Sheila Davis; Luis Eduardo Aute
- Producer: Jim Foglesong

Ed Ames singles chronology
"When the Snow Is on the Roses" (1967)	"Who Will Answer?" (1967)	"Apologize" (1968)

"Who Will Answer?" released as a single in November 1967, is the title track from the 1968 album Who Will Answer? by the adult contemporary singer Ed Ames. Originally written as the Spanish song "Aleluya No. 1" by the Philippines-born Spanish singer-songwriter, poet and painter Luis Eduardo Aute, it was adapted into an English-language version with new lyrics by songwriter Sheila Davis. Another cover was made by country singer Hank Snow.

== Background ==
Luis Eduardo Aute's Spanish-language song "Aleluya No. 1" became a number-one hit in Spain in spring 1967 and was well received in other Spanish-speaking countries. Subsequently, Eddie Deane, of the music publisher Sunbury Music, brought the song to Music Row executive Jim Foglesong, who worked with American singer Ed Ames. Deane played the Spanish instrumental version for Foglesong while reciting songwriter Sheila Davis' new English-language lyrics. Ames agreed to record it, and a recording session was held in November 1967 at RCA Victor's Music Center of the World Studios in Hollywood, California. It was arranged and conducted by Perry Botkin, Jr.

Recorded in stereo as RCA Victor 9400 with the B-side "My Love Is Gone from Me", the single shipped to distributors on November 24, 1967. On the previous evening, Ames performed the song on the NBC late-night television talk show The Tonight Show Starring Johnny Carson.

A hit for Ames, the song reached #19 on the Billboard Hot 100 music singles chart, and #6 on that industry trade magazine's Adult Contemporary chart. The song was reported as being the most played on jukeboxes in February. It was Ames' fourth charting single that year, following "My Cup Runneth Over", "Time, Time", and "When the Snow is on the Roses". The song later appeared as the title track of Ames' 1968 album Who Will Answer? In Canada the song reached #6 on the weekly charts.

== Critical assessment ==
Billboard magazine, naming the song its "Record of the Week", praised the topical lyrics and the unusual musical combination of "Gregorian-like chant ... Johann Sebastian Bach and ... hard rock", saying the song "expresses the urgent feelings of our times and deals with such meaningful subject matter as nuclear war, apathy, religious discontent and the underlying confusion of today's generation." The magazine's "Spotlight Singles" reviewer that week said, "With appeal for all programming and buyers, the vital lyric message based upon today's world situation must be heard throughout."

The song reflects contemporary topics and anxieties of the times, with references to such subject matter as nuclear holocaust ("'Neath the spreading mushroom tree / The world revolves in apathy as overhead, a row of specks roars on, drowned out by discotheques And if a secret button's pressed / because one man has been outguessed / Who will answer?"), drug use ("In the rooms with darkened shades / the scent of sandalwood pervades. / The colored thoughts in muddled heads / Reclining in the rumpled beds / Of unmade dreams that can't come true...."), war ("On a strange and distant hill / A young man's lying very still. / His arms will never hold his child / Because a bullet running wild / Has struck him down...."), divorce ("Side by side two people stand / Together vowing, hand-in-hand / That love's imbedded in their hearts / But soon an empty feeling starts / To overwhelm their hollow lives"), and suicide ("High upon a lonely ledge / a figure teeters near the edge / And jeering crowds collect below / To egg him on with, 'Go, man, go!'") culminating in an existential question: "If the soul is darkened / By a fear it cannot name / If the mind is baffled / When the rules don't fit the game / Who will answer?"

The liner notes on the single state that, "As music speaks for the times, it also changes with the times. In Who Will Answer? we find contemporary lyrics that reflect the feelings and concerns of today's world. To the music of Gregorian-type chanting, Baroque harpsichord figures and hard rock, Sheila Davis' penetrating poem can hardly be considered of the 'moon-June' variety."

== Chart performance ==
Chart peaks for "Who Will Answer?" by Ed Ames
Chart (1967–1968)	Peak position
U.S. Billboard Hot 100	19
U.S. Billboard Easy Listening	6
U.S. Cashbox Top 100 Singles	14
U.S. Record World Juke Box Top 25	1
Canadian RPM Top Singles	6
Australian KMR Top Singles	71

Chart peaks for "Who Will Answer?" by Hank Snow
Chart (1968)	Peak position
U.S. Billboard Top Country Singles	69
U.S. Record World Top C&W Singles	75
