= My Cup Runneth Over (album) =

Studio album by Ed Ames
- Released: 1967
- Recorded: September 25, 1965 – December 13, 1966
- Studios: Webster Hall, New York City
- Genre: Traditional pop
- Label: RCA Victor
- Producer: Jim Foglesong

Ed Ames chronology
More I Cannot Wish You (1966)	My Cup Runneth Over (1967)	Time, Time (1967)

Singles from My Cup Runneth Over
- 1. "Melinda" Released: October 1965; 2. "There's A Time For Everything" Released: July 1966; 3. "My Cup Runneth Over" Released: November 1966

My Cup Runneth Over is a 1967 studio album by Ed Ames. At the 10th Annual Grammy Awards, it was nominated for Album of the Year.

== Release ==
My Cup Runneth Over debuted at number 137 on the Billboard 200 on March 4, 1967. By March 25, 1967, My Cup Runneth Over had already sold three times as many copies as the Ames Brothers had ever sold. The album peaked at number four on the Billboard 200 on April 22, 1967.

== Critical reception ==
Professional ratings
Review scores
Source	Rating
AllMusic	4/5 stars
The Encyclopedia of Popular Music	3/5 stars

Peter Reilly of Stereo Review stated that "Aside from its derivative pall, 'My Cup Runneth Over' is a randomly pleasant album," believing that the "selection of songs is extremely good." Reilly noted that the arrangers and conductors all "have all done yeoman service."

== Track listing ==
Side 1
No.	Title	Writer(s)	Length
1.	"My Cup Runneth Over (From I Do, I Do!)"	Harvey Schmidt, Tom Jones	2:44
2.	"In The Arms Of Love (From What Did You Do in the War, Daddy?)"	Henry Mancini, Jay Livingston, Ray Evans	2:37
3.	"Au Revoir (From Sherry!)"	James Lipton, Laurence Rosenthal	2:35
4.	"Don't Blame Me"	Jimmy McHugh, Dorothy Fields	2:43
5.	"Watch What Happens (From The Umbrellas of Cherbourg)"	Michel Legrand, Norman Gimbel	2:27
6.	"Melinda (From On a Clear Day You Can See Forever)"	Alan Jay Lerner, Burton Lane	2:05

Side 2
No.	Title	Writer(s)	Length
1.	"Bon Soir Dame"	Bud Dashiell	2:48
2.	"There's A Time For Everything"	Al Stillman, Alex Alstone	2:38
3.	"True Love (From High Society)"	Cole Porter	2:56
4.	"Our Love Is A Living Thing"	David Blume, Jerry Keller	2:09
5.	"Edelweiss (From The Sound Of Music)"	Oscar Hammerstein II, Richard Rodgers	2:25
Total length:			28:12

== Accolades ==
My Cup Runneth Over was nominated for Album of the Year at the 10th Annual Grammy Awards, making it one of three nominations he got at the ceremony.

Organization	Year	Category	Result	Ref.
Grammy Awards	1968	Grammy Award for Album of the Year	Nominated	

== Certification ==
Region	Certification	Certified units/sales
United States (RIAA)	Gold	500,000^{^}
^{^} Shipments figures based on certification alone.
