= Think Summer =

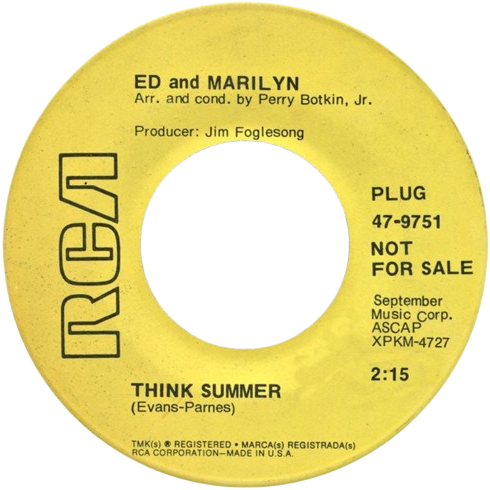

Single by Ed Ames and Marilyn Maye
- B-side: "You Do"
- Released: June 1969
- Studio: RCA's Music Center of the World, Hollywood, California
- Genre: Pop; easy listening
- Length: 2:15
- Label: RCA Victor Records
- Songwriters: Paul Evans; Paul Parnes
- Producer: Jim Foglesong

Ed Ames singles chronology
"Son of a Travelin' Man" (1969)	"Think Summer" (1969)	"Leave Them a Flower" (1969)

Marilyn Maye singles chronology
"Sing Me a Tune" (1969)	"Think Summer" (1969)	"Jimmy" (1969)

"Think Summer" is a 1969 song written by Paul Evans and Paul Parnes. It was most notably performed by Ed Ames and Marilyn Maye, whose duet of the song was released as a single in the summer of 1969 by RCA Victor Records. It made chart appearances on US adult-oriented charts.

== Background and release ==
American singer Ed Ames enjoyed pop and easy listening success in 1967 and 1968, charting several songs in the top-40 of charts, and had three number 1 songs. Marilyn Maye, like Ames, was also an RCA Victor recording star and had success with Broadway show tunes "Cabaret" and "Step to the Rear" during this time as well. RCA partnered up both singers for "Think Summer" and "You Do" in 1969, with critics noting the "sales" appeal of the single. The song was written by Paul Evans and Paul Parnes who provided Maye her previous 1968 hit "Feelin'". The single was produced by Jim Foglesong and arranged by Perry Botkin Jr..

== Critical reception ==
Professional ratings
Review scores
Source	Rating
Cashbox	Positive (Pick of the Week)
Record World	Positive (Sleeper of the Week)

The single received a positive critical reception upon its release. Cashbox believed that it's an "Automatic easy listening and MOR magnetism is a solid start that can be counted on by this duet appearance by Ed Ames & Marilyn Maye." They stated that "The material's delightful lilt and summery approach could just prove the key to making the side an across-the-board hit." Record World put the single in its "Sleeper of the Week" section and said that Ames and Maye "on this new Evans-Parnes song" is a "pay-off idea to team these two".

== Chart performance ==
"Think Summer" became an easy listening success while missing the pop charts. The single debuted on the Billboard Easy Listening chart in the issue date July 19, 1969, reaching number 17 during an eight-week run on it. It entered the Record World Top-Non Rock chart in the issue dated July 25, 1969, peaking at number 17 during an eight-week run as well. It was reissued in May 1970 under the catalogue number 47-9843 and recharted for three weeks, peaking at number 38 on both charts.

== Charts ==
Chart performance for "Think Summer"
Chart (1969)	Peak position
US Billboard Easy Listening	17
US Record World Top-Non Rock	17
Chart (1970)	Peak position
US Billboard Easy Listening	38
US Record World Top-Non Rock	38

== Release history ==
Release history and formats for "Think Summer"
Region	Date	Format	Label	Ref.
United States	June 1969	7 inch single	RCA Victor Records	
Canada	June 1969	7 inch single	RCA Victor Records	
United States	May 1970	7 inch single	RCA Victor Records	
Canada	May 1970	7 inch single	RCA Victor Records	
New Zealand	July 1970	7 inch single	RCA Victor Records	
