= Eddie Snyder =

American songwriter

Background information
- Born: Edward Abraham Snyder; February 22, 1919; New York City, United States
- Died: March 10, 2011 (aged 92) Lakeland, Florida, United States
- Genres: Pop music, easy listening
- Occupation: Songwriter

Edward Abraham Snyder (February 22, 1919 – March 10, 2011) was an American composer and songwriter. Snyder is credited with co-writing the English language lyrics and music for Frank Sinatra's 1966 hit, "Strangers in the Night".

== Life ==
Snyder was born in New York City on February 22, 1919. He studied piano at the Juilliard School before taking a job as a songwriter at the Brill Building. Eddie Snyder died on March 10, 2011, in Lakeland, Florida, at the age of 92. He had two children, Rich Snyder and Valli Kane.

== Career ==
=== Early years ===
Snyder reportedly had a "decent" voice and he found employment as a "piano man" entertaining people in bars, clubs and hotels, first in New York and later in Miami, where he met his future wife, Jessie, in 1945.

=== Songwriting ===
In 1951 after arriving back in New York, Snyder would begin composing his own material. With lyrics by Stanley J. Kahan, he wrote Perry Como's 1957 hit "The Girl with the Golden Braids", and two years later with Kahan again, and the singer Rudy Vallee, "Talk to Me" for Frank Sinatra. Snyder's biggest success would come with "Strangers in the Night" where he co-wrote the lyrics with Charles Singleton, a song that Sinatra would take to the No. 1 spot on the charts. Snyder and Singleton also wrote the lyrics for "Moon Over Naples", which was retitled to "Spanish Eyes" in vocal versions, and was most famously recorded by Al Martino, who at first did not like the lyrics, so Snyder and Singleton had to rewrite them. The duo also wrote Margaret Whiting's last major hit "The Wheel of Hurt". All of these songs were major Easy Listening hits. He worked most often with Singleton and also Larry Kusik.

He often put words to music by Bert Kaempfert or James Last, with him co-writing the lyrics for James Last's composition of "Games That Lovers Play" (a hit for singers like Wayne Newton, Eddie Fisher and Connie Francis) and also the Ed Ames hit of the Kaempfert composition of "When the Snow Is on the Roses". He worked with Singleton further, writing the lyrics with him for Kaempfert's "Remember When (We Made These Memories)", a hit for Newton. He also co-wrote Connie Francis' 1968 minor hit "Why Say Goodbye".
