= When the Snow Is on the Roses =

1967 single by Ed Ames

Single by Ed Ames

from the album When the Snow Is on the Roses
- B-side: "Let Me So Love"
- Released: September 1967
- Genre: Traditional pop
- Length: 2:35
- Label: RCA Victor
- Songwriters: Ernst Bader, Larry Kusik and Eddie Snyder (lyrics), James Last (music)
- Producer: Jim Foglesong

Ed Ames singles chronology
"Timeless Love" (1967)	"When the Snow Is on the Roses" (1967)	"Who Will Answer?" (1968)

"When the Snow Is on the Roses"

Single by Sonny James

from the album When the Snow Is on the Roses
- B-side: "Love is a Rainbow"
- Released: July 5, 1972
- Recorded: June 1, 1972
- Genre: Country
- Length: 2:42
- Label: Columbia
- Songwriters: Ernst Bader, Larry Kusik and Eddie Snyder (lyrics), James Last (music)
- Producer: George Richey

Sonny James singles chronology
"That's Why I Love You Like I Do" (1972)	"When the Snow Is on the Roses" (1972)	"White Silver Sands" (1972)

"When the Snow Is on the Roses" is a song that was an adult contemporary hit for Ed Ames in 1967, spending four weeks at #1 on the Easy Listening chart, but only reached #98 on the Billboard Hot 100. In 1972, a version recorded by Sonny James went to number one on the country charts and almost entered the Pop charts.

== Song history ==
The song was originally recorded by Ames in 1967. In 1968, it was covered by Anita Bryant on her album, In Remembrance of You (The Story of a Love Affair), and by Roy Drusky on his album, Jody and the Kid.

Sonny James had just finished a successful stay at Capitol Records, where he had enjoyed a string of 16 consecutive No. 1 hits during the late 1960s and early 1970s, and had signed with Columbia Records in 1972. His cover version of "When the Snow is On the Roses" was his first single for Columbia Records and it began another long string of hits by "The Southern Gentleman". The song was his 22nd No. 1 song on the Billboard Hot Country Singles chart in mid-September 1972.

Ernst Bader wrote the original lyrics to the song in German. Larry Kusik and Eddie Snyder wrote the English translation. The music was by James Last.

Elvis Presley also sang this song live in Las Vegas on August 24, 1970, in the MS (Midnight Show). This performance is registered in the Live In Las Vegas BMG box set. It is an audience recording.

== Chart performance ==
=== Ed Ames ===
Chart (1967)	Peak position
U.S. Billboard Hot 100	98
U.S. Billboard Easy Listening	1
U.S. Cashbox Top 100 Singles	97

=== Sonny James ===
Chart (1972)	Peak position
U.S. Billboard Hot Country Singles	1
U.S. Billboard Bubbling Under Hot 100	3
Canadian RPM Country Tracks	1
