= Changing, Changing =

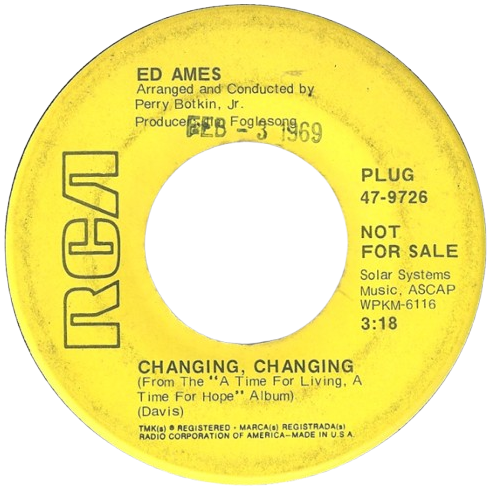
- A promo vinyl record for the song

Single by Ed Ames

from the album A Time for Living, a Time for Hope
- B-side: "Six Words"
- Released: February 1969
- Studio: RCA's Music Center of the World, Hollywood, California
- Genre: Pop; easy listening
- Length: 3:18
- Label: RCA Victor Records
- Songwriter: Sheila Davis
- Producer: Jim Foglesong

Ed Ames singles chronology
"Kiss Her Now" (1968)	"Changing, Changing" (1969)	"Son of a Travelin' Man" (1969)

"Changing, Changing" is a 1969 song written by Sheila Davis. It was most notably performed by Ed Ames, who released it as a single in early 1969. His version reached the US and Canadian charts and received a positive reception. Ames had recorded Davis' previous hit song "Who Will Answer?" in 1967.

== Background and release ==
American singer Ed Ames enjoyed brief pop success in 1967 and 1968, charting several songs in the top-100 of charts. As sales decreased he switched his style to message songs in 1969 with "Changing, Changing" and the LP A Time for Living, a Time for Hope. The song was released as the lead single for the album, along with "Six Words" on the flip. The song was noted by critics as having the "attraction of his 'Who Will Answer?' with none of the controversy". The single was produced by Jim Foglesong, and arranged by Perry Botkin, Jr..

== Critical reception ==
Professional ratings
Review scores
Source	Rating
Record World	4/5 stars
Billboard	Positive (Spotlight)
Cashbox	Positive (Pick of the Week)

The single received a positive critical reception upon its release. Billboard magazine stated that "With much of the fire, drive and sales appeal of his 'Who Will Answer' past hit, Ames has a winner in this meaningful lyric rhythm ballad." They believed that "Once again, Perry Botkin, Jr. comes up with an exceptional arrangement in solid support of Ames stirring performance." Cashbox believed that "Operating with a contemporary song whose lyric is likely to be at least as appealing with youngsters as with his easy listening followers." They described the material as his "regularly superlative performance," calling it an "Especially fine offering." Record World gave the single a four-star rating and said that "Robust Ed sings out on a meaningful new ballad," noting that it "Will be heard across the land."

== Chart performance ==
"Changing, Changing" debuted on the US Billboard Bubbling Under the Hot 100 in the issue dated February 22, 1969, peaking at No. 130 during a four-week run on the chart. The single reached a higher No. 112 on the Cashbox Looking Ahead Top 100 Singles and No. 114 on the Record World Singles Coming Up charts. It was his final entry on both charts. The single also climbed to No. 11 on the Billboard Easy Listening chart, and at No. 10 on the Record World Top-Non Rock chart. "Changing, Changing" achieved more adult contemporary success in Canada, where it was ranked at No. 6 on the RPM Adult Contemporary survey. It was his final top-10 on both American adult-oriented charts.

== Charts ==
Chart performance for "Changing, Changing" by Ames
Chart (1969)	Peak position
US Billboard Bubbling Under the Hot 100	130
US Cashbox (Looking Ahead) Top 100 Singles	112
US Record World Singles Coming Up	114
US Billboard Easy Listening	11
US Record World Top-Non Rock	10
Canadian RPM Adult Contemporary	6
