= Time, Time (song) =

Single by Ed Ames

from the album Time, Time
- B-side: "One Little Girl at a Time" (United States) "There's a Time for Everything" (Australia)
- Released: April 1967
- Genre: Traditional pop
- Length: 2:49
- Label: RCA Victor
- Songwriters: Armand Canfora, Joss Baselli, Michel Jourdan, Mort Shuman
- Producer: Jim Foglesong

Ed Ames singles chronology
"My Cup Runneth Over" (1967)	"Time, Time" (1967)	"Ballad of 'The War Wagon'" (1968)

"Time, Time" is the title track from a 1967 album by Ed Ames. The song is also known as "Tu As Beau Sourire" (You Have a Beautiful Smile). The music was composed by Armand Canfora and Joss Baselli with lyrics by Michel Jourdan. In English the lyrics were written by Mort Shuman. On the Billboard Hot 100, "Time, Time" peaked at number sixty-one, and was Ames' second of three number ones on the Easy Listening chart in the US, when it topped the chart in June 1967.

== Charts ==
Chart performance for "Time, Time" by Ed Ames
Chart (1969)	Peak position
US Billboard Hot 100	61
US Billboard Easy Listening	1
US Cashbox Top 100 Singles	66

== See also ==
- List of Billboard Easy Listening number ones of 1967
