= Ed Ames =

American singer and actor (1927–2023)

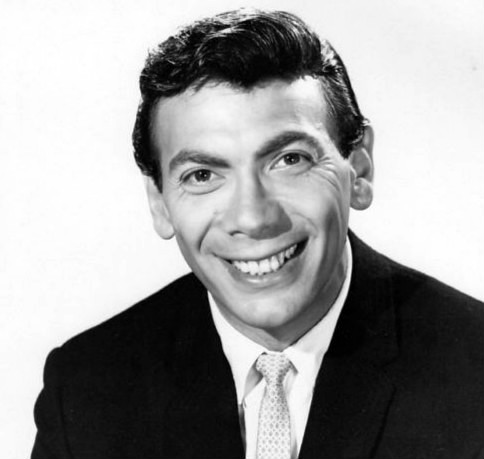
- Ames in 1959

Background information
- Also known as: Eddie Ames
- Born: Edmund Dantes Urick; July 9, 1927; Malden, Massachusetts, U.S.
- Died: May 21, 2023 (aged 95) Beverly Hills, California, U.S.
- Genres: Pop; traditional pop; easy listening; country pop
- Occupations: Singer, actor
- Years active: 1947–2023
- Labels: Decca, Coral, RCA Victor
- Formerly of: Ames Brothers

Edmund Dantes Urick (July 9, 1927 – May 21, 2023), known professionally as Ed Ames or Eddie Ames, was an American pop singer and actor. He was known for playing Mingo in the television series Daniel Boone, and for his Easy Listening No. 1 hits of the mid-to-late 1960s including "My Cup Runneth Over", "Time, Time", and "When the Snow Is on the Roses". He was also part of the popular 1950s singing group with his siblings, the Ames Brothers.

== Early life and career ==
Ames was born in Malden, Massachusetts, on July 9, 1927, to Jewish parents Sarah (Zaslavskaya) and David Urick, a.k.a. Eurich, who had emigrated from Ukraine. He was the youngest of nine children, five boys and four girls.

Ames grew up in a poor household. He attended the Boston Latin School and was educated in classical and opera music, as well as literature. While still in high school, the brothers formed a quartet and often won competitions around the Boston area. Three of the brothers later formed the Amory Brothers quartet and went to New York City, where they were hired by bandleader Art Mooney. Playwright Abe Burrows helped the brothers along the way, suggesting the siblings change their group's name to the Ames Brothers.

The Ames Brothers were first signed on with Decca Records in 1947, but because of the Musician Union's ban in 1948, a holdover from the 1942–1944 musicians' strike, Decca released only three singles by the brothers, and one backing Russ Morgan. As the ban was ending, they signed with Coral Records, a subsidiary of Decca. They had their first major hit in the 1950s with the double-sided "Rag Mop" and "Sentimental Me". The brothers later joined RCA Victor records and continued to have success throughout the 1950s with many hits like "It Only Hurts For a Little While", "You, You, You", and "The Naughty Lady of Shady Lane". The brothers made regular appearances on network television variety programs, and in 1955 briefly had a 15-minute show of their own.

== Acting career ==
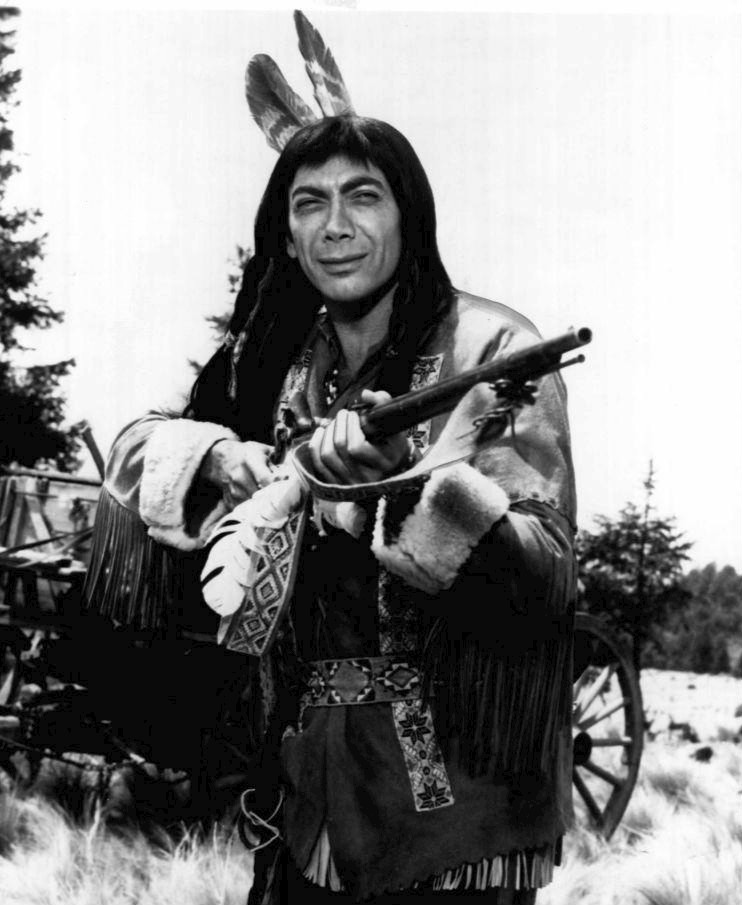
Ames as Mingo in the 1960s NBC television series, Daniel Boone

In the early 1960s, the Ames Brothers disbanded, and Ed Ames, pursuing a career in acting, studied at the Herbert Berghof School. His first starring role was in an off-Broadway production of Arthur Miller's The Crucible, going on to starring performances in The Fantasticks off-Broadway and Carnival!, which was on Broadway.

Ames was in the national touring company of Carnival. His dark complexion and sharp facial features led to his being cast regularly as a Native American. He played Chief Bromden in the Broadway production of One Flew Over the Cuckoo's Nest, opposite Kirk Douglas.

Actor and comedian Norman Wisdom and Ed Ames chatting in late 1967.

Talent scouts at 20th Century Fox saw Ames in the production and invited him to play Cherokee tribesman Mingo on the NBC television series Daniel Boone with Fess Parker. His character's father was an English officer, the Fourth Earl of Dunmore, played in the show by Walter Pidgeon. In that show, Mingo was the Earl's eldest son and thus entitled to claim the title as the fifth Earl, but decided to remain part of the Cherokee Nation. In an episode of Season One, Ames also portrayed Mingo's evil twin brother, Taramingo. Ames' main character was actually named Caramingo, but went by Mingo throughout the entire series.

Ames played a wanted murderer holed-up in a hotel during a smallpox quarantine on a 1962 The Rifleman episode ("Quiet Night, Deadly Night"), and guest-starred as Kennedy in the 1963 episode "The Day of the Pawnees, Part 2" on ABC's The Travels of Jaimie McPheeters, with Kurt Russell in the title role. He guest-starred in 1963 on Richard Egan's NBC modern western series, Redigo. In 1967, Ames appeared in the musical comedy Androcles and the Lion, along with the soundtrack album released alongside it.

=== The Tonight Show Starring Johnny Carson ===
While playing Mingo on television, Ames developed skill in throwing a tomahawk. This led to one of the most memorable moments of his career, when he appeared on The Tonight Show Starring Johnny Carson on April 27, 1965.

During the course of the show, Ames and Johnny Carson were discussing Ames' tomahawk-throwing abilities. When Ames claimed that he could hit a target from across the room, Carson asked Ames if he could demonstrate this skill. Ames agreed, and a wood panel with a chalk outline of a cowboy was brought onto the stage. As the studio band played a bar of the theme music from Adventures of Pow Wow, Ames proceeded to throw the tomahawk, which hit the drawn cowboy square in the groin with the handle pointing upward. This led to a very long burst of laughter from the audience.

After a moment, Ames proceeded to walk toward the target to retrieve the tomahawk but Carson stopped him and allowed the situation to be appreciated for its humor. Ames then said to Carson: "Think I'm going into another business, John." To which Carson ad-libbed: "I didn't even know you were Jewish!" and "Welcome to Frontier Bris." (It's not known whether Carson was aware that Ames actually was Jewish.) Ames then asked Carson if he would like to take a turn throwing, to which Carson replied: "I can't hurt him any more than you did." The clip became a favorite of Carson's own yearly highlight show and subsequent blooper television specials.

=== Summer stock ===
Later in his career, Ames became a fixture on the Kenley Players circuit, headlining in Shenandoah (1976, 1979, 1986), Fiddler on the Roof (1977), South Pacific (1980), Camelot (1981), and Man of La Mancha (1984).

== Singing career ==
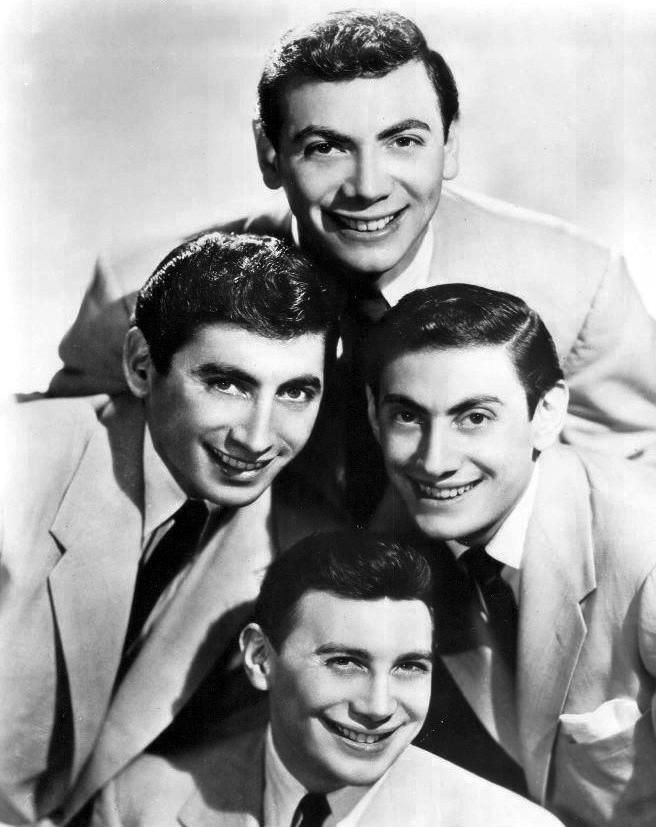
The Ames Brothers in 1955, Ed Ames at the top.

Ames recorded under the name "Eddie Ames" while still with the Ames Brothers, releasing the single "The Bean Song (Which Way to Boston?)" in January, 1957. Several of his other releases in 1963 and 1964 went unnoticed.

Ames is known for his baritone voice. He released his first RCA Victor chart single, "Try to Remember" in late 1964. The song did respectably (No. 73 on the pop charts, No. 17 in the Adult Contemporary listing) in 1965. A bigger success came in 1967 with "My Cup Runneth Over". The song was both a No. 8 pop hit and a No. 1 adult contemporary radio hit. Thereafter he had Adult Contemporary hits with "Time, Time", "When the Snow Is on the Roses", and "Timeless Love", the latter written by Buffy Sainte-Marie. He did make the pop Top 20 one last time in his singing career with the protest song "Who Will Answer?" written by Sheila Davis in 1968. The subsequent single "Apologize" reached No. 79 on the US Billboard Hot 100 and No. 47 in the Canadian RPM Magazine Top 100 Singles chart. It climbed to the Adult Contemporary Top 10 during this time. In the summer Ames collaborated with songwriter Jimmy Webb for "All My Love's Laughter", which hit the charts in August.

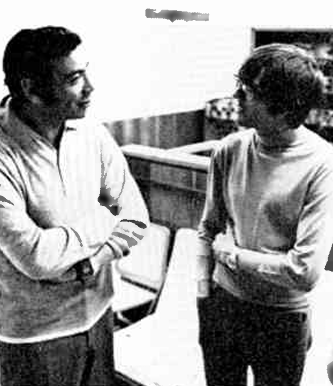
Singer Ed Ames standing with songwriter Jimmy Webb in the recording studio in mid-1968.

In 1969, he continued recording message-oriented singles again. "Changing, Changing" written by Davis, became his final US Adult Contemporary top-15 single and Canadian top-10. The song spawned the album A Time for Living, a Time for Hope, which hit the charts in the spring. Critics noted that it contained "meaningful" songs. A similar styled album preaching "brotherly love" was released later that year (Love of the Common People), though critics believed that Ames was not suited for the material chosen. Ames' recording career stopped after the RCA Victor contract ended in 1973. His final albums included tributes to Jim Reeves, (Remembers Jim Reeves) and Burt Bacharach & Hal David, (Sings the Songs of Bacharach and David). The latter was his final chart entry, placing at No. 199 nationally in February 1971.

Ames's distinctive baritone is a regular radio presence during the Christmas season, as well, thanks to his version of "Do You Hear What I Hear?" The song received its best-selling treatment from Bing Crosby in 1962, but Ames' version, recorded a few years later, is in frequent holiday rotation. Ames also sang the "Ballad of the War Wagon" in the John Wayne/Batjac Productions movie, The War Wagon in 1967.

== Personal life and death ==
Ed Ames married Sarita (Sara) Cacheiro in 1947 and they had three children, Sonya, Ronald, and Linda (known as Marcila, who died in 2007). The couple divorced on October 5, 1973 in Santa Monica, California. Ames married Jeanne Arnold Saviano in 1998; the marriage lasted until his death in 2023.

While maintaining his career, Ames attended the University of California, Los Angeles, where he received a bachelor's degree in theater and cinema arts in 1975.

At the age of 77, Ames stated: "I am a secular Jew, but I feel strongly about Israel and the Jewish communities of Europe". He became president of the Los Angeles chapter of the Zionist Organization of America.

While appearing in Daniel Boone, Ames maintained homes in Woodland Hills, Los Angeles and Teaneck, New Jersey.

From 1968 until 1987, he owned a percentage of the Phoenix Suns basketball team.

Ames died of Alzheimer's disease at his Beverly Hills, California home on May 21, 2023, at the age of 95. He is buried at Pierce Brothers Westwood Village Memorial Park and Mortuary in Westwood, California.

== Discography ==
The list below shows the singer's studio albums and hit songs only. His full discography, singles and other releases are described in a separate article. Ames placed several albums on the Billboard Top LP's and singles on the Billboard Hot 100 charts.

=== Studio albums ===
- Opening Night with Ed Ames (1964)
- The Ed Ames Album (1964)
- My Kind of Songs (1965)
- It's a Man's World (1966)
- More I Cannot Wish You (1966)
- My Cup Runneth Over (1967)
- Time, Time (1967)
- Christmas with Ed Ames (1967)
- When the Snow Is on the Roses (1967)
- Who Will Answer? (1968)
- Sings Apologize (1968)
- The Hits of Broadway and Hollywood (1968)
- A Time for Living, a Time for Hope (1969)
- The Windmills of Your Mind (1969)
- Love of the Common People (1969)
- Sing Away the World (1970)
- Christmas is the Warmest Time of the Year (1970)
- Sings the Songs of Bacharach and David (1971)
- Ed Ames (1972)
- Somewhere, My Love (1972)
- Ed Ames Remembers Jim Reeves (1972)
- Songs from "Lost Horizon" and Themes from Other Movies (1972)

=== Hit songs ===
Year	Single	Chart Positions						Album
Year	Single	US AC	US	CB	CA (RPM)	CA (AC)	AUS	Album
1965	"Try to Remember"	17	73	83	39	-	-	Opening Night with Ed Ames
1966	"My Cup Runneth Over"	1	8	8	9	-	34	My Cup Runneth Over
1967	"Time, Time"	1	61	66	60	-	-	Time, Time
1967	"Timeless Love"	2	-	109	-	-	-	When the Snow Is on the Roses
1967	"When the Snow Is on the Roses"	1	98	97	-	-	-	When the Snow Is on the Roses
1968	"Who Will Answer?"	6	19	14	6	-	71	Who Will Answer and Other Songs of our Time
1968	"Apologize"	10	79	66	47	-	-	Sings Apologize
1968	"All My Love's Laughter"	12	122	106	-	-	-	—
1968	"Kiss Her Now"	22	-	77	65	-	-	The Hits of Broadway and Hollywood
1969	"Changing, Changing"	11	130	112	-	6	-	A Time for Living, a Time for Hope
1969	"Son of a Travelin' Man"	21	92	94	81	14	61	The Windmills of Your Mind
1969	"Think Summer" (with Marilyn Maye)	17	-	-	-	-	-	—
1969	"Leave Them a Flower"	19	-	-	-	33	-	Love of the Common People
1969	"A Thing Called Love"	21	-	115	-	22	-	Love of the Common People
1970	"Three Good Reasons"	28	-	-	-	-	-	Sing Away the World
1970	"Think Summer" (with Marilyn Maye)	38	-	-	-	-	-	—
1970	"Chippewa Town"	36	-	-	-	-	-	—
"—" denotes releases that did not chart or were not released in that territory.
