= Larry Kusik =

American songwriter

Larry Kusik (also known as Larry Kusic) is a lyricist. He is perhaps best known for writing the lyrics for the tune "Speak Softly Love", the love theme from the 1972 film The Godfather. He has also written lyrics to many other movie themes, including "A Time for Us" from the 1968 film version of Romeo and Juliet, Murder on the Orient Express, Mommie Dearest, "Love Said Goodbye" from the 1974 film The Godfather Part II and Serpico. Along with composer Paul Evans, he wrote the song "Live Young" for the spring break film Palm Springs Weekend.

His nephew is musician and producer Lenny Kaye.

== Awards ==
- Grammy nomination for "A Time for Us"
- ASCAP award for "When the Snow is on the Roses"
- ASCAP award for "Speak Softly Love"
- BMI award for "Lady" (from Billy's Hollywood Screen Kiss)
