= My Cup Runneth Over (song) =

1966 single by Ed Ames

Single by Ed Ames

from the album My Cup Runneth Over
- B-side: "It Seems a Long Long Time" (from La Mandragola) (United States) "Climb Ev'ry Mountain" (from The Sound of Music) (Australia/UK)
- Released: November 1966
- Recorded: September 28, 1966
- Studio: Webster Hall
- Genre: Traditional pop
- Length: 2:45
- Label: RCA Victor
- Songwriters: Harvey Schmidt; Tom Jones
- Producers: Jim Foglesong; Joe Reisman

Ed Ames singles chronology
| "There's a Time for Everything" (1966) | "My Cup Runneth Over" (1966) | "Time, Time" (1967) |

"My Cup Runneth Over" is a song originally written by Harvey Schmidt and Tom Jones for the musical I Do! I Do!.

It became the title track of the 1967 album My Cup Runneth Over by Ed Ames.

== Release ==
"My Cup Runneth Over" debuted at number 82 on the Billboard Hot 100 on January 21, 1967. It peaked at number eight on the Billboard Hot 100 on March 25, 1967. It later ranked number 46 on the Billboard Year-End Hot 100 singles of 1967. The song peaked at No. 1 on Billboard's Easy Listening chart, and was the first No. 1 of Record World's new Top Non-Rock chart, similar to the Easy Listening chart.

In Canada, the song reached number nine on the weekly charts, and number 87 on the year-end chart.

Ames performed "My Cup Runneth Over" on The Ed Sullivan Show on September 24, 1967.

== Accolades ==
At the 10th Annual Grammy Awards, "My Cup Runneth Over" was nominated for Record of the Year and Song of the Year.
