= Oakley Hall (disambiguation) =

Oakley Hall (1920–2008) was an American novelist.

Oakley Hall may also refer to:

== People ==
- Oakley Hall III (1950–2011), American playwright
- Oakley Hall (band), an American folk rock band

== Buildings ==
- Oakley Hall, Staffordshire, a historic building in Mucklestone, Staffordshire, England
- Oakley Hall, Hampshire
- Great Oakley Hall, a historic building in Great Oakley, Northamptonshire, England

== See also ==
- A. Oakey Hall (1826–1898), mayor of New York City, 1869–1872
