= Lexington, New York =

- Town
- Location in Greene County and the state of New York
- Coordinates: 42°12′54″N 74°23′5″W
- Country: United States
- State: New York
- County: Greene

Government
  - Type: Town Council
  - Town Supervisor: JoEllen Schermerhorn (D)
  - Town Council: Members' List: • Keith Mellott (D); • Lynn Byrne (D); • John W. Berger, Jr. (R); • Glenn E. Howard (R)

Area
  - Total: 80.25 sq mi (207.85 km^{2})
  - Land: 80.21 sq mi (207.75 km^{2})
  - Water: 0.039 sq mi (0.10 km^{2})
- Elevation: 1,601 ft (488 m)

Population (2020)
  - Total: 770
  - Density: 9.6/sq mi (3.7/km^{2})
- Time zone: UTC-5 (Eastern (EST))
  - Summer (DST): UTC-4 (EDT)
- ZIP Codes: 12452 (Lexington); 12492 (West Kill); 12468 (Prattsville); 12444 (Jewett); 12480 (Shandaken)
- Area code: 518
- FIPS code: 36-42202
- GNIS feature ID: 979147
- Website: www.lexingtonny.com

Lexington is a town in Greene County, New York, United States. The population was 770 at the 2020 census. The town is in the southwestern part of Greene County.

== History ==
The area was first settled circa 1788. The town of Lexington was established in 1813, as the "Town of New Goshen", from the town of Windham. Within a few months, the name was altered to "Lexington".

In 1976, playwright Oakley Hall III co-founded Lexington Conservatory Theatre at historic Lexington House. The company performed there for five years before moving to Albany, NY to become Capital Repertory Theatre. Lexington House was later used as a summer retreat by Ensemble Studio Theatre. The location was also featured in the 2004 documentary The Loss of Nameless Things.

In 2024, the town of Lexington applied for funding from the New York State Restore NY program, on behalf of a group of projects designed to revitalize the Lexington hamlet and restore and re-use several nearby historic structures. The proposal includes the restoration of Lexington House and the adjacent Barn Theatre, which previously housed Lexington Conservatory and Ensemble Studio Theatre.

== Geography ==
According to the United States Census Bureau, the town has a total area of 79.7 square miles (206 km^{2}), of which 79.7 square miles (206 km^{2}) is land and 0.04 square miles (0.10 km^{2}), or 0.04%, is water.

Lexington is within the Catskill Mountains; most of the town is also inside the Catskill Park Blue Line. The southern town line is the border of Ulster County.

Schoharie Creek flows through the town. The West Kill, an 11-mile-long (18 km) tributary of the Schoharie, drains much of the town.

The summit of West Kill Mountain, sixth-highest peak in the Catskills at approximately 3,880 feet (1,180 m), is the highest point in the town. Three other Catskill High Peaks—Rusk, North Dome and Sherrill—are also within Lexington.

== Demographics ==
Historical population
Census	Pop.	Note	%±
1820	1,798		—
1830	2,548		41.7%
1840	2,813		10.4%
1850	2,263		−19.6%
1860	1,657		−26.8%
1870	1,371		−17.3%
1880	1,356		−1.1%
1890	1,229		−9.4%
1900	1,153		−6.2%
1910	1,054		−8.6%
1920	1,075		2.0%
1930	815		−24.2%
1940	827		1.5%
1950	833		0.7%
1960	698		−16.2%
1970	666		−4.6%
1980	819		23.0%
1990	835		2.0%
2000	830		−0.6%
2010	805		−3.0%
2020	770		−4.3%
U.S. Decennial Census 2020

=== 2024 ===
According to the 2024 American Community Survey (ACS), there were 763 permanent residents of Lexington, with 337 households in the state averaging 2.3 persons from each household. 71% of households were owned by married couples, 20% by non-family members, 8% female single residents, and less than 1% of households were owned by single male homeowners.

64% of the population over 15 were married, The per capita Income was $74,98, while the median household income was $129,028.

Lexington had a predominantly Caucasian male population as of 2026, with 87% of the population being Caucasian, and 59% being male. With 5% of the population being Hispanic, 3% being Asian, and 1% being Native American.

=== 2000 ===
As of the census of 2000, there were 830 people, 375 households, and 219 families residing in the town. The population density was 10.4 inhabitants per square mile (4.0/km^{2}). There were 854 housing units at an average density of 10.7 per square mile (4.1/km^{2}). The racial makeup of the town was 97.35% White, 0.96% Native American, 0.60% Asian, 0.36% from other races, and 0.72% from two or more races. Hispanic or Latino of any race were 1.69% of the population.

There were 375 households, out of which 21.9% had children under the age of 18 living with them, 48.3% were married couples living together, 6.7% had a female householder with no husband present, and 41.6% were non-families. 35.5% of all households were made up of individuals, and 16.8% had someone living alone who was 65 years of age or older. The average household size was 2.21 and the average family size was 2.91.

In the town, the population was spread out, with 20.2% under the age of 18, 4.5% from 18 to 24, 22.9% from 25 to 44, 31.2% from 45 to 64, and 21.2% who were 65 years of age or older. The median age was 47 years. For every 100 females, there were 86.5 males. For every 100 females age 18 and over, there were 96.4 males.

The median income for a household in the town was $29,375, and the median income for a family was $39,583. Males had a median income of $26,250 versus $31,000 for females. The per capita income for the town was $20,471. About 9.0% of families and 12.9% of the population were below the poverty line, including 15.7% of those under age 18 and 14.0% of those age 65 or over.

== Communities and locations in Lexington ==
- Bushnellsville – A hamlet at the southern town line (in Ulster County) on Route 42.
- Lexington – The hamlet of Lexington is located on Route 42.
- Mosquito Point – A hamlet west of Lexington village.
- North Lexington – A hamlet in the northwestern part of the town.
- Spruceton – An isolated hamlet in the eastern part of the town, on County Route 6.
- West Kill – A hamlet south of Lexington village on Route 42.

== Hurricane Irene 2011 ==
On August 27, 2011, Hurricane Irene (at that point, a tropical storm) inflicted damage to the town. Very heavy rainfall caused the Schoharie Creek to surge higher and cause immense widespread flooding. High wind speeds were also present. A small bridge was destroyed, and numerous houses were also washed away by the creek. Farms near the creek were flooded as well. Flash flooding also was an issue. Certain roads that run through the town were flooded and some were damaged. Many homes in Lexington lost power.

The Federal Emergency Management Agency arrived in Lexington following the storm. People volunteered for cleanup work and many donated food and clothing. Power was eventually restored to all affected areas.
