= Broadstreet Hollow Creek =

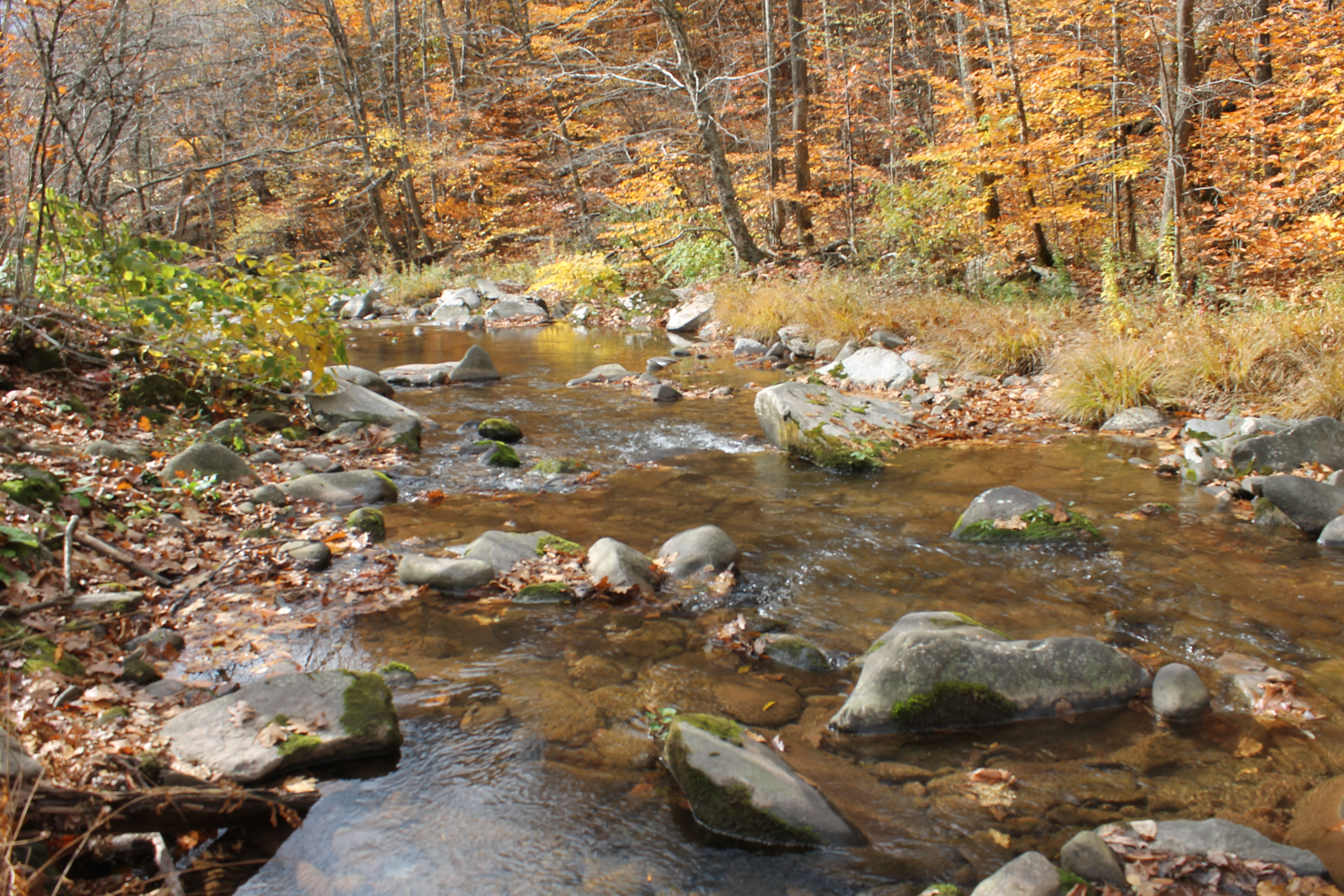

- Location of mouth within New York Broadstreet Hollow Creek (the United States)

Location
- Country: United States
- State: New York
- Region: Catskill Mountains
- Counties: Greene, Ulster
- Towns: Lexington, Shandaken

Physical characteristics
- Mouth: Esopus Creek
  - location: Allaben
  - coordinates: 42°06′40″N 74°21′35″W

Broadstreet Hollow Creek or Broadstreet Hollow Brook is a river in New York. It begins in the town of Lexington in Greene County, and flows south, through the town of Shandaken in Ulster County then converges with the Esopus Creek.

The creek was named after Major John Bradstreet, an officer in the English Army during the French and Indian War, who is known for attacking Fort Frontenac.

== Watershed ==
Broadstreet Hollow Creek is the second largest tributary to Esopus Creek in the project area, with a watershed of 9.2 square miles and a total length of 5.5 miles. The headwaters are located on the southern slopes of West Kill Mountain. The stream flows to the southwest for 3.9 miles before turning south and traveling the remainder of its distance to the Esopus Creek. It enters Esopus Creek approximately 1,500 feet downstream of the Shandaken Tunnel outlet. The watershed is mountainous with steep slopes and a forest cover of 99.5 percent. The valley bottom is narrow with little floodplain area. Broadstreet Hollow Creek runs parallel to Broadstreet Hollow Road along the lower half of its course passing under nine bridges. As a result of the narrow geological setting and transportation infrastructure, the course of the stream is highly constrained. Many residences are located close to the stream. This proximity coupled with little floodplain area suggests that these structures are at risk of flooding during high discharges.

== Geology ==
The geological setting of Broadstreet Hollow Creek is similar to Bushnellsville Creek. The surficial geology consists of glacial and alluvial deposits. The exposed sediments are primarily glacial till and alluvium although lacustrine clay has been observed in the banks and the bed. The bedrock consists of red beds including shales and mudstones as well as grey sandstones and grey shales. However, there is no evidence of bedrock in the valley bottom due to thick deposits of glacial sediment.

== Hydrology ==
On January 19, 1996, the Catskill Mountains experienced a heavy mid-winter rain and unseasonably warm temperatures causing rapid snowmelt, extreme runoff, and extensive flooding. During the flood, a small section of Broadstreet Hollow Creek experienced thirty feet of erosion, which caused damage to one home and threatened several others. In response the Natural Resources Conservation Service (NRCS) provided assistance under the Emergency Watershed Protection Program (EWP). The emergency project rebuilt the streambank, and provided stabilization to an additional 475 feet of streambank. During the project, the contractor experienced difficulties with clay deposits that had become exposed, causing turbidity. The emergency project resulted in the loss of streambed erosion protection, due to the course streambed material being used to restore the eroded streambank. Removal of the streambed exposed deep deposits of glacial and lacustrine clay. Then between early 1996 and late 1999, the creek experienced severe degradation, leading to bank erosion and large amounts of clays being deposited in the stream channel. In the fall of 1999, Tropical Storm Floyd further degraded the stream channel. Rapid incision of the channel, creating a constant upwelling of highly turbid groundwater. The turbid condition continued through low and high flows, with the stream remaining turbid from the project site to the Esopus Creek.
