= Richard Zobel =

American actor (1952–2005)

- Born: Richard J. Zobel Jr. June 18, 1952; West Chester, Pennsylvania, U.S.
- Died: October 4, 2005 (aged 53)
- Occupation: Actor

Richard J. Zobel Jr. (June 5, 1952 – October 4, 2005) was an American actor. He starred as the attorney Aaron Levinsky in the original Broadway run of Nuts in 1980. Over the course of his career, he was also a singer, instrumentalist, animator, writer, and producer.

== Career ==
Zobel was born in West Chester, Pennsylvania, and moved to New York City for his acting career.

=== New York and Hollywood acting career ===
Zobel's Off-Broadway credits included All's Well That Ends Well and The Taming of the Shrew in the New York Shakespeare Festival in Central Park in 1978, and The Country Girl in 1984.

He starred as the attorney Aaron Levinsky in the original Broadway run of Nuts in 1980. He appeared in small and supporting film roles, and had guest appearances in over a dozen television series including The X-Files, ER, China Beach, Hill Street Blues, and Star Trek: Voyager, from 1984 through 1999. He was also a singer and a musician.

He acted and sang in, and was the vocal arranger for, the 1987 film Walker, and the 2008 making-of documentary about the film, Dispatches from Nicaragua, is dedicated to his memory.

=== Lexington Conservatory Theatre ===
Zobel was a founding company member of Lexington Conservatory Theatre and friend and collaborator of co-founder Oakley Hall III. He performed with them in numerous roles and continued his association with the company when it moved to Albany, NY and became Capital Repertory Theatre. Zobel starred as the title role in Hall's first adaptations of Alfred Jarry's Ubu Roi (called Ubu Rex) and its sequels, in New York City Off-Off-Broadway and at Lexington, co-producing as well as creating the masks for it. He also appeared in the world premiere of Hall's Grinder's Stand. Zobel's work with the two companies totaled more than 200 performances over the course of two decades.

In 2004, Zobel appeared in the documentary The Loss of Nameless Things, recalling his experience of working with Lexington Conservatory Theatre and Oakley Hall III. It was his last appearance on film.

=== Rubber Chicken Cards ===
In 2000, Zobel co-founded Rubber Chicken Cards, which sells online greeting cards that combine voice-over acting with irreverent humor, with fellow actor and Lexington alumni Steven Rotblatt. For the cards Zobel sang, played several instruments, wrote scripts, did animation, and voiced numerous characters.

Zobel died of cancer in October 2005 in Hershey, Pennsylvania where he lived. He was survived by his wife and daughter.

== Filmography ==
=== Film ===
Year	Title	Role	Notes
1984	Once Upon a Time in America	Reporter 2	
1984	Teachers	Propes	
1985	Turk 182	TV Interviewer	
1987	From the Hip	Matt Cowens	
1987	Walker	Lemuel	
1992	To Sleep with a Vampire	Cabby	
1993	Warlock: The Armageddon	Barker	
1995	Tall Tale	Barkeep	
1998	Montana	Simms	

=== Television ===
Year	Title	Role	Notes
1983–1984	The Edge of Night	Eric Blake	15 episodes
1985	Search for Tomorrow	Elmo	2 episodes
1987	Hill Street Blues	Scanlon	Episode: "Dogsbreath Afternoon"
1987–1988	Crime Story	Lt. Col. Milton Dance	4 episodes
1988	Simon & Simon	Head of Security	Episode: "Simon & Simon and Associates"
1989	Matlock	Val Delaney	2 episodes
1990	Mancuso, F.B.I.	FBI Counter Intelligence Agent	2 episodes
1990	Parker Kane	Jack Moody	Television film
1990	Jake and the Fatman	Manny	Episode: "'Round Midnight"
1990	The Young Riders	McPhalen	Episode: "Star Light, Star Bright"
1991	Mrs. Lambert Remembers Love	Mitch	Television film
1991	China Beach	Tony	Episode: "Through and Through"
1992	Melrose Place	Employment Officer	Episode: "Friends & Lovers"
1993	Knots Landing	Middle-Aged Hippie	Episode: "Some Like It Hot"
1993	Bodies of Evidence	Bert	Episode: "Flesh and Blood"
1994	M.A.N.T.I.S.	Homeless Man	Television film
1997	ER	Mr. Bartok	Episode: "You Bet Your Life"
1997	Star Trek: Voyager	Gaumen	Episode: "The Raven"
1997–1998	Profiler	Ben Farrarini	3 episodes
1999	The X-Files	Al	Episode: "Three of a Kind"
