= Gloria Muzio =

American theatre and television director

- Occupations: Theatre director, television director
- Years active: 1998–present

Gloria Muzio is an American theatre and television director. She has worked on a number of TV shows including Criminal Minds, Brothers & Sisters, The Black Donnellys, The Closer, ER, Third Watch, Law & Order, Law & Order: Criminal Intent, Law & Order: Special Victims Unit, The Wire and Oz.

== Education ==
Muzio attended Mount Holyoke College, earning a degree in theatre, before attending Florida State University's graduate program, where she graduated with an MFA in Directing. Her work at FSU included directing student productions of Home Free! by Lanford Wilson and Moonchildren by Michael Weller.

== Theatre career ==
Muzio's first professional theatre production was the world premiere of Arlecchino Undone by fellow FSU alumni Christopher Ceraso at Lexington Conservatory Theatre in upstate New York. When the company moved to Albany and formed Capital Repertory Theatre, she continued her association with the organization and directed numerous other productions, including the world premiere of November by Don Nigro. Her production of the world premiere of Alice and Fred by Dan Ellentuck transferred to Broadway for a brief run at Cherry Lane Theatre. In 1988, she directed Other People's Money by Jerry Sterner, first at Hartford Stage followed by a highly successful run Off-Broadway. A film adaptation was produced in 1991.

== Television career ==
Edwin Sherin hired Muzio to direct her first episode of Law and Order in 1998, helping launch a successful career as a television director.

== Filmography ==
- Deception
  - "You're the Bad Guy" (2013)
- The Good Wife
  - "Crash" (2009)
- Brothers & Sisters
  - "An American Family" (2007)
  - "The Other Walker" (2007)
- Criminal Minds
  - "Doubt" (2007)
  - "The Big Game" (2007)
  - "The Last Word" (2006)
  - "The Fisher King: Part 2" (2006)
  - "A Real Rain" (2006)
- Saving Grace
  - "And You Wonder Why I Lie" (2007)
- The Black Donnellys
  - "Lies" (2007)
- Ghost Whisperer
  - "Deja Boo" (2007)
  - "Weight of What Was" (2007)
  - "Deadbeat Dads" (2008)
  - "Save Our Souls" (2008)
  - "Thrilled To Death" (2009)
  - "Till Death Do Us Start" (2009)
  - "Dead Air" (2010)
- The Closer
  - "Mom Duty" (2006)
  - "Fatal Retraction" (2005)
  - "You Are Here" (2005)
- Huff
  - "Bethless" (2006)
- E-Ring
  - "War Crimes" (2006)
- ER
  - "I Do" (2005)
  - "Refusal of Care" (2005)
- House M.D.
  - "Hunting" (2005)
- Third Watch
  - "End of Tour" (2005)
  - "Higher Calling" (2004)
  - "A Ticket Grows in Brooklyn" (2003)
- CSI: Miami
  - "Identity" (2005)
- Hawaii (2004)
- Law & Order
  - "Hands Free" (2004)
  - "City Hall" (2004)
  - "Maritime" (2003)
  - "Under God" (2003)
  - "Maritime" (1998)
- Joan of Arcadia (2003)
- Platinum
  - "Power" (2003)
- The Dead Zone
  - "Dead Men Tell No Tales" (2003)
- Ed
  - "May the Best Man Win" (2002)
  - "The Shot" (2002)
- Presidio Med
  - "Pelagros" (2002)
- Law & Order: Criminal Intent
  - "Best Defense" (2002)
  - "Semi-Professional" (2002)
  - "Poison" (2002)
- The Wire
  - Episode 1.08 "Lessons" (2002)
- Law & Order: Special Victims Unit
  - "Care" (2001)
- Oz
  - "Orpheus Descending" (2001)
- Son of the Beach
  - "Miso Honei" (2000)
