= Lexington Conservatory Theatre =

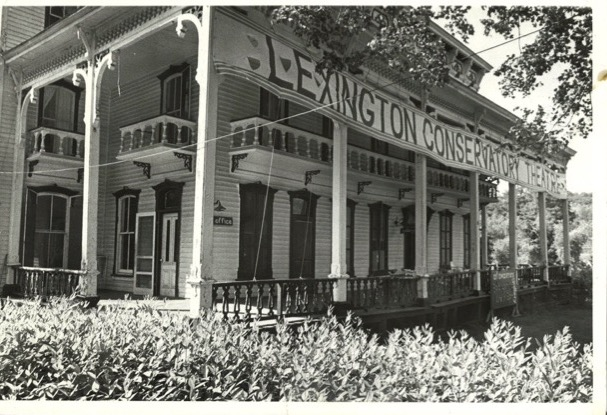
Lexington Conservatory Theatre

Lexington Conservatory Theatre was an equity summer theatre company in the Catskills town of Lexington, New York. Co-founded in 1976 by a group of professional theatre artists including Oakley Hall III, Michael Van Landingham and Bruce Bouchard, the theatre operated for five seasons at the historic Lexington House, a former hotel turned artist retreat. Hall was seriously injured in a fall from a bridge during the summer of 1978. That summer and Hall's life in the aftermath of a traumatic brain injury were the subjects of the documentary The Loss of Nameless Things.

"...on par with the Woodstock, Williamstown and Berkshire playhouse troupes," summarized Fred LeBrun in the Albany Times Union in 1978, "but with an attitude all their own."

"Their productions roared with a full-throated vitality that's never since had a regional equal, and in their offstage life, troupe members indulged in carnal and intoxicating pursuits with comparable zeal," said critic Steve Barnes, decades later. "They were on a mission to change the world, like generations of young artists before and since."

== Formation ==
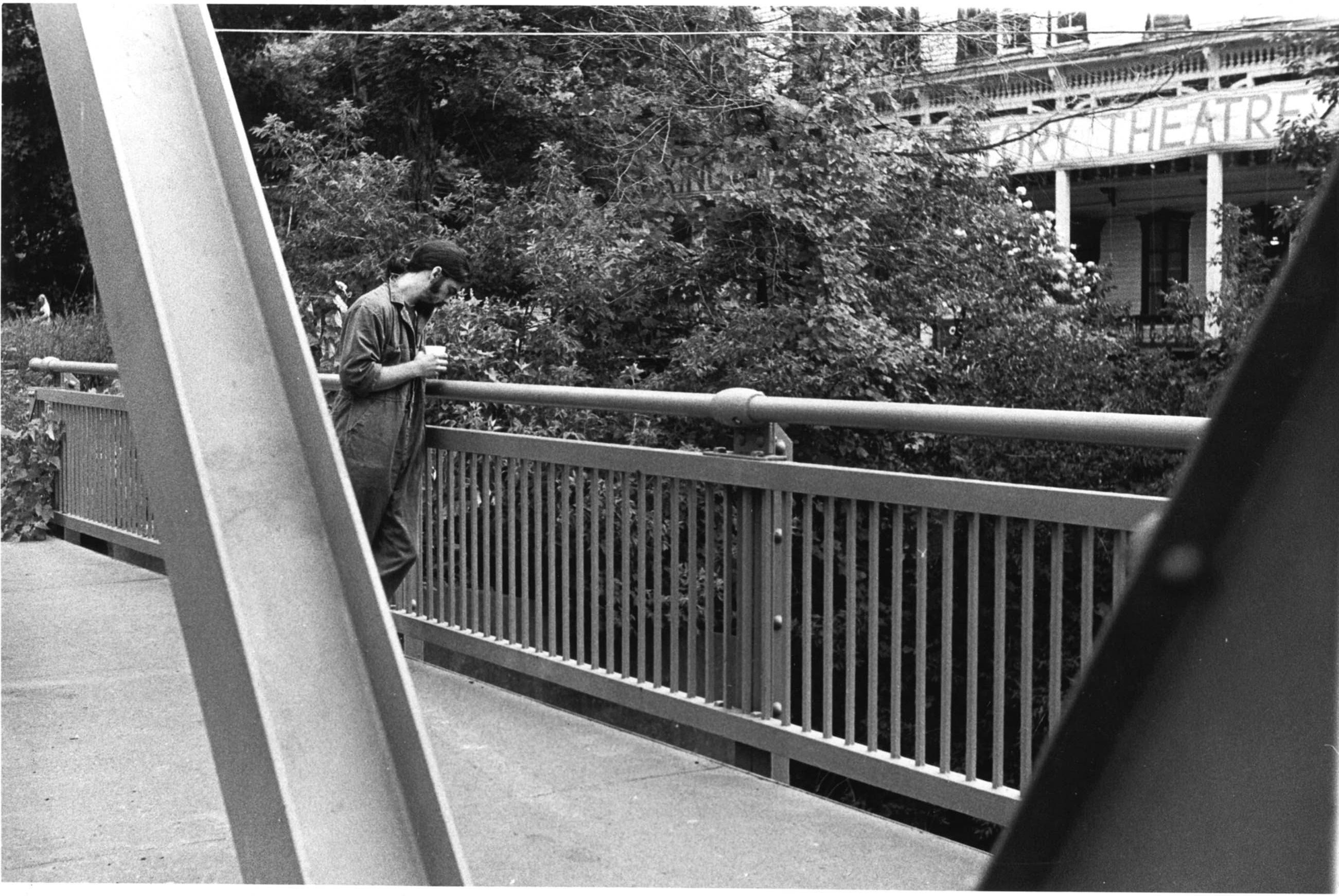
Playwright Oakley Hall III on the Rt 42 Bridge in Lexington, NY

Oakley Hall III, Michael van Landingham, Thomas Culp and Bruce Bouchard met while attended college at UC Irvine, working together on productions at Irvine Repertory Theatre and American Conservatory Theater. The group of friends eventually moved to New York City to continue their careers. In 1974, Evelyn Weisberg, owner of Lexington House, met Bouchard and fellow actor Kate Kelly while operating a local educational theatre program. Learning of the nascent theatre group forming in New York, Weisberg supported the formation of the group in 1975, inviting them to take residence at Lexington House and its surrounding facilities. Cabaret star Julie Wilson held a fundraiser for the company in a downtown Manhattan loft, netting $7,000 in seed funding for the organization.

After extensive work on the facility over the course of several summers, the nascent company of approximately 30 members held an open house on June 3, 1976 for the surrounding community, previewing their first season amid music and square dancing. Subscription rates were $10-$12.

The first season launched on July 8 with a production of Our Town. Photographer John Margolies visited the site that summer.

Leadership included executive director Michael Van Landingham, treasurer Thomas Culp, and artistic director Oakley Hall III, later briefly joined by Abraham Tetenbaum for the 1979 season

The facility at Lexington House included an art gallery, cabaret/bar, numerous smaller cabins and two 150-seat theatres, presenting a main stage season as well as numerous staged readings and developmental works. Tickets were sold via several subscription packages in addition to single ticket sales. When LCT opened in 1976, the Barn Theatre was the primary theatre space, outfitted with seats donated from Theatre 80 in Greenwich Village, NYC. In 1978, after extensive work by the company, the refurbished River Theatre opened with the production of A Streetcar Named Desire.

== 1976-1980 seasons ==

Over the course of its first three years, the organization had grown to include several simultaneous projects. In addition to the main summer series at Lexington, LCT produced PROVOS, a new play reading series, an Upstate Tour production series aimed at serving rural communities, and a League of Women Artists focused on developing theatre opportunities for women. Company members also taught a series of theatre classes to students ages 6–18.

By the end of the 1977 season, the company's profile had raised considerably. "The two venerable rival companies at Williamstown, Mass. and Woodstock, New York could not boast seasons of such sustained artistic accomplishment as the young, energetic players at Lexington Theatre enjoyed in the second season of their ascendency," according to the River Valley Chronicle.

The theatre also supported the development of original music. In 1976, the company helped launch the Sonora Music Festival in Lexington, which continued for several seasons. In 1977, LCT featured Earful, a concert series by Joseph Lyons and future Dream Theater star Jordan Rudess. Lyons served as the music director and Rudess as associate music director, composing and performing for several shows as well. On August 14, 1978, PBS affiliate WMHT broadcast a documentary about the theatre company as part of The Summer Show series. Hosted by Joan Lapp, the production interviewed cast and crew of the production of Monte Merrick's Nurseryland.

By its third season, the company had secured significant funding from the New York State Council on the Arts and was growing its reputation nationally, with attention from critic Brooks Atkinson. In 1978, the company won a regional theatre award from The Rockefeller Foundation. In 1979, the company received a $2,000 grant from the National Endowment for the Arts for its new play development work, and in 1980, $4,000.

The 1980 world premiere of Close Ties by Elizabeth Diggs starred notable stage actress Margaret Barker. She praised the company and its work, saying "I haven't felt this since I was with the Group Theater."

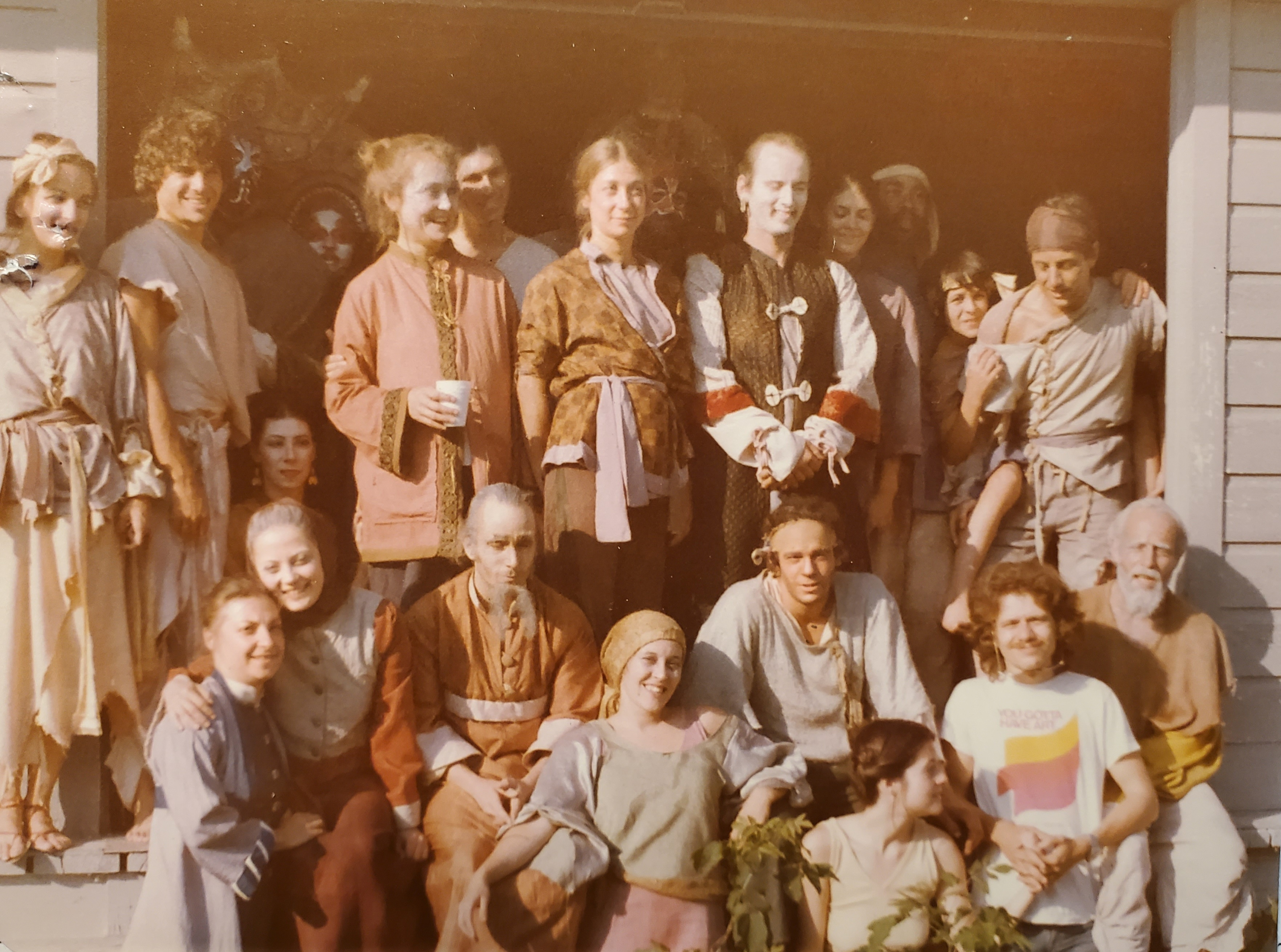
Cast and designers of LCT's 1979 production of "The Good Woman of Szetuan"

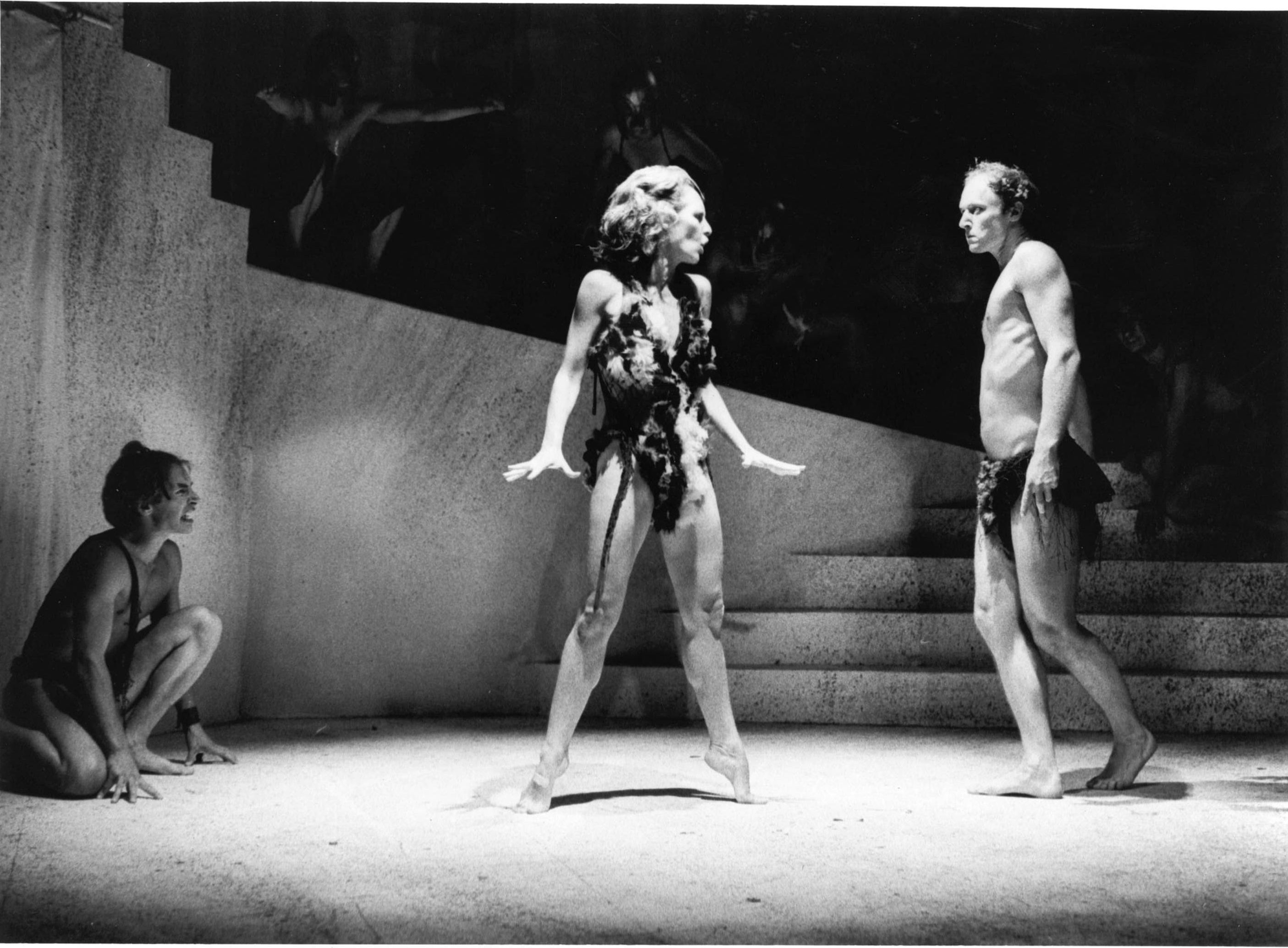
1980 production of A Midsummer Night's Dream

== Move to Albany ==
In 1977, the company received a Whitney Foundation award to support the search for a city in which to develop a resident theatre company. A year later, LCT staff began visiting Albany to plan such a theatre, envisioning a downtown space for a 400-500 seat facility.

On April 18, 1979, executive director Michael Van Landingham and artistic director Abraham Tetenbaum held a press conference at the EBA Dance Studio in Albany, NY. They announced that the company would form a theatre in downtown Albany that followed a fall-winter-spring season, to be known as Capital Repertory Company or "Capital Rep." While they had reviewed various buildings in search of a suitable facility, they had decided that refurbishing a non-theatre building into a 450-seat theatre was the most viable option. On April 19 and 20, the company presented a series of events called "The Break In", intended to orient the community to the theatre company and its work. The event included music and video presentations, a discussion with director Lev Shekhtman, and selections of scenes from past productions.

In March 1980, LCT produced The Tavern by George M. Cohan at the Egg Theatre in Albany, under the Capital Rep name. Directed by future producing artistic director Peter Clough, it starred company members Michael J. Hume, Court Miller, Janni Brenn, Patricia Charbonneau, Sofia Landon Geier and Steve Hytner. "The idea is to make Albany the hub of our operations," Van Landingham told The Knickerbocker News prior to opening night. "We want to construct a network of productions, centered here."

In October 1980, amidst circulating rumors, executive director Michael Van Landingham announced that the theatre would not return to Lexington House and instead move permanently to Albany. He cited a desire to be closer to the larger populace of Albany, which comprised much of the summer audience. The company did not want to abandon summer productions, and was also seeking a rural property to develop into a summer residence. No such project subsequently emerged, however. That December, the group began its first full season as Capital Repertory Theatre at Page Hall in Albany.

== Legacy ==
LCT helped launch the careers of several notable alumni, and produced numerous world premieres as well as development workshops for emerging writers, including playwrights such as Elizabeth Diggs, Paula Vogel, Peter Parnell, Monte Merrick, Wendy Kesselman and Kathleen Betsko.

The company's descendant, Capital Repertory Theatre, continues to produce a year-round season of productions, including a new play development program.

In 2004, the feature film documentary The Loss of Nameless Things debuted on the festival circuit and later was broadcast on the PBS series Independent Lens. It chronicled the history of the company and its founder, Oakley Hall III. The film sparked renewed interest in Hall's work as well as a biopic that was in development but never produced.

In 2022, photographer and documentary filmmaker Michael Bronfenbrenner published Lexington Through the Lens, a photographic recollection of the company.

== Notable alumni ==
- Patricia Charbonneau
- Steve Hytner
- Lev Shekhtman
- John Griesemer
- Richard E. Council
- Cotter Smith
- Richard Zobel
- Court Miller
- Sofia Landon Geier
- James Rebhorn
- Jordan Rudess
- Mark Nelson
- Phil Soltanoff
- Sands Hall
- Gloria Muzio

== World premieres ==
- Frankenstein by Oakley Hall III
- Lazarus' Cue by Mariquita Platov
- Nurseryland by Monte Merrick
- The Revengers adapted by William C. Sandwick and Philip Soltanoff, music composed by Philip Soltanoff
- Beatrice (Cenci) and the Old Man by Oakley Hall III
- The Prevalence of Mrs. Seal by Otis Bigelow
- Grinder's Stand by Oakley Hall III
- Arlecchino Undone by Christopher Ceraso
- Close Ties by Elizabeth Diggs

In addition to the company's summer productions, LCT also produced plays in New York City, Off and Off-Off Broadway.

== Production History ==
=== 1976 season ===
Season	Venue	Work performed	Director	Cast	Dates	Notes	Ref.
1976	River Theatre	Our Town by Thornton Wilder	Michael Van Landingham	Sofia Landon, Bruce Bouchard, Duncan Brine, Michael J. Hume, Richard Zobel, Richard Gambe, Laralu Smith, Sherrie Ahlin,	July 8–11, August 5–8	The debut production of LCT. "This loving and witty look at daily life in Grover's Corners is presented on an almost bare stage, stripped to the essentials...aided by two stage managers," said critic Hilde Schuster, later an LCT and Capital Repertory Theatre staff member.	
1976	River Theatre	Charley's Aunt by Brandon Thomas	Bruce Bouchard	Michael J. Hume, Gretchen Van Ryper, Sherrie Ahlin, Richard Zobel, Laralu Smith, Richard Gambe,	July 15–18, August 19–22	Director Bruce Bouchard also provided scene design and updated the play to the 1920s.	
1976	River Theatre	Hail Scrawdyke! by David Halliwell	Oakley Hall III	Michael J. Hume as Scrawdyke, with Richard Zobel, Kevin O'Brien, Stephen Nisbet and Kate Kelly	July 22–25	LCT produced this show with substantially the same cast that winter, Off-Broadway.	
1976	River Theatre	A Weekend of Varied Delights: Comin' Through the Rye by William Saroyan, The Lover by Harold Pinter and Winners by Brian Friel		Richard Gambe, Laralu Smiht, Kate Kelly, Gevin O'Brien, Stephen Nisbet, Bruce Bouchard, Richard Zobel, Susan Sharpe and Peter Lowndes, with musical interludes by Grace Marie Testani, Lee Ahlin, Stephen Nisbet and Joseph Lyons.			
1976	Barn Theatre	The Enchanted by Jean Giradoux	Michael Van Landingham	Kate Kelly as Isabel, with Bruce Paul Verdeaux, Jennifer Daweson, Susan Sharp, Gretchen Van Ryper, Richard Gambe, Lee Ahlin, Duncan Brine, Music by Joseph Lyons	August 12–15	"The play again illustrated the remarkable versatility of the Lexington Conservatory Theatre company. The set design, the original score and the acting were excellent in this ambitious production," according to the Catskill Daily Mail.	
1976	Barn Theatre	Frankenstein by Oakley Hall III, with original music composed and performed by Judith Martin	Oakley Hall III and Michael Van Landingham	Christopher Venom (Michael J. Hume) as the Creature; Sofia Constant(Sofia Landon Geier) as Elizabeth, Jenifer Dawson as Justine and Bruce Carson as Dr. Frankenstein	August 26–29, September 2–5	World premiere production. The cast deployed pseudonyms to avoid Actors Equity Association sanctions during this first season. An expanded version of Frankenstein with additional material by Kathleen Masterson premiered at Capital Repertory Theatre in 1982, with Richard E. Council as the monster.	
1976	River Theatre	Portable Annabelle by Edward Wolf, with music by Lee Ahlin	Sherrie Ahlin	Gretchen Van Ryper, Richard Gambe, Laralu Smith, Bruce Carson, Duncan Brine,	August 6–18	A fantasy for children about a little girl transported into her television. Executive director Michael Van Landingham described the production as a "critical and financial success," though it closed two weeks earlier than scheduled "in order to conserve the energies of our actors in these last two weeks."	

=== 1977 season ===
Season	Venue	Work performed	Director	Cast	Dates	Notes	Ref.
1977	Barn Theatre	The Tavern by George M. Cohan	Steven Patterson	Court Miller, Michael J. Hume, Steven Nisbet, Duncan Brine, Laralu Smith, Robert Le Voyd Wright	June 23–26, June 30-July 3		
1977	River Theatre	Picnic by William Inge	Bill Herndon	Anthony Cummings, Barbara Kolsun, Sands Hall, Ken Weisbarth, Mary Baird	July 7–10, July 14–17	Bill Herndon's only LCT credit. An actor and director for theatre and television, he died in 1990.	
1977	Barn Theatre	'Tis Pity She's a Whore by John Ford	Oakley Hall III	Steven Patterson, Sofia Landon, Michael J. Hume, Steven Rotblatt,	July 21–24, 28-31	Sets by Derek Tillett and Kathy Jacobsen, lighting design by Linnaea Tillett. "...a splendid, if somewhat tense, cast proved that the young company richly deserves its place in the 'outstanding category'". - The Daily Mail. "A stunning coup du theatre" - River Valley Chronicle	
1977	Barn Theatre	The Prevalence of Mrs Seal by Otis Bigelow	Otis Bigelow	Sofia Landon as Mrs Seal, Michael J. Hume as Murdstone, James Goodwin Rice as Mr. Smith, Sands Hall as Belinda, Stephen Nisbet as Harry, Jani Brenn as Mrs. Pilgrim, Richard Zobel as Dr. Porteous and Tony Cummings as Igor.	August 4–7 and 11-14	"...other-wordly--entirely plausible, crazy and fun." - Woodstock Times. "A triumph of Box Office and Art" - River Valley Chronicle. Described as a world premiere, although there had been a production at Brandeis University. Author Otis Bigelow dedicated the published version of the play to Oakley Hall III. Richard Council, who joined the company in 1979, appeared in the New York premiere of the play in 1981.	
1977	Barn Theatre	Quality Street by J.M. Barrie	Michael Van Landingham	Janni Brenn, Pamela Brown, Winship Cook, Oakley Hall III, Kristin Joliff, Sofia Landon, Miriam Layn, Stephen Nisbet, Steven Rotblatt, James Lee Wilson	August 18–21, 25-28	Choreography by Winship Cook, set design by Leslie Tillett and Linda Milian, lighting design by Michael Van Landingham. "All beauty, sentiment and high style under Michael Van Landingham's direction...One would have to single out Sofia Landon as the Best Actress of Summer '77". - River Valley Chronicle "...a thoroughly amiable experience, but many rough edges." - New York Theatre Review	

=== 1978 season ===
Season	Venue	Work performed	Director	Cast	Dates	Notes	Ref.
1978	Barn Theatre	You Can't Take it With You by Moss Hart and George S. Kaufman	Steven Rotblatt	James Goodwin Rice, Kristin Jolliff, Kate Kelly, Michael J. Hume, Daniel Schweid, Laralu Smith, Court Miller, Mary Baird, Bruce Bouchard, Susanne Marley, Linda Thompson, Eddie Coiro, Kate Kelly, Mark Nelson, Charlotte Webb, Robert Le Voyd Wright, Robert S. Eichler. With lighting by Linnaea Tillett and Barbara Emily Tulliver, costumes by Sofia Landon, sound by Joseph Lyons and stage management by Wendy Chapin.	June 14–25	"First-rate all the way...Steven Rotblatt, director, has taken a sackful of wildcats by the tail--this maelstrom can only be handled by a strong-willed trainer--and made a workable, thoroughly enjoyable, well-paced play."- The Knickerbocker News It was actor Mark Nelson's first role with the company. Fred LeBrun of the Times Union, in a favorable review, observed that the material echoed the eccentric personalities of the company itself. "...as clean, crisp and well-paced through tricky comedy as you are apt to see at Williamstown, Woodstock or the Berkshire Playhouse".	
1978	River Theatre	A Streetcar Named Desire by Tennessee Williams	Michael Van Landingham	Janni Brenn as Blanche, Stephen Burleigh as Stanley, Sofia Landon as Stella. With Court Miller, Mark Nelson, Bruce Bouchard, Mairy Baird, Michael Hume and Rosalyn Farinella.	June 28-July8	Sets designed by Stephen Nisbet. Music by Joseph Lyons, lighting design by Linnaea Tillet and Barbara Tulliver."In brief, the Lexington production is magnificent." - Dan DiNicoloa. "With a brilliant performance by Jani Brenn in the tragic lead role of Blanche Du Bois leading the way, the production sidestepped a few opening night flaws and captured the rhythm of the troubled lives of the characters." - The Knickerbocker News. This was the first production to take place in the River Theatre after its recent refurbishment.	
1978	River Theatre	Beatrice (Cenci) and the Old Man by Oakley Hall III	Wendy Chapin	Steven Rotblatt, Sofia Landon, Michael J. Hume, Peggy Schoditsch, Kristin Jolliff, Robert le Voyd Wright	July 12–22	"...perversely and engagingly humorous," according to critic Dan DiNicola in a review published on July 17. "[It] deserves serious and intelligent consideration as a work of both potential and merit." That night, Hall fell from a nearby bridge and suffered a traumatic brain injury. Previously, the play was read by the company in 1977.	
1978	Barn Theatre	Tiny Alice by Edward Albee	Thomas Culp	James Goodwin Rice, Richard Gambe, Winship Cook, Bruce Bouchard, Michael J. Hume	July 26-August 5	"Culp gains good performances from his cast as, no matter how obtuse the script may appear, it is theatrical and capable of eliciting strong acting," notes the Albany Times Union. "Tiny Alice is hardly traditional summer fare, and perhaps only such a group as the one at Lexington might attempt it."	
1978	River Theatre	Nurseryland by Monte Merrick	Peggy Schoditsch	Court Miller, Barbara Kolsun, Daniel Schweid, Mary Baird, Susanne Marley, James Goodwin Rice, Steven Rotblatt	August 9–19	World premiere. Six school teachers are confined to a boiler room. "Nurseryland still needs some reworking. But in its present form it is almost always fun to watch, and in its best moments is profound and moving as well." - Dan DiNicola, Schenectady Gazette	
1978	Barn Theatre	The Tragical History of Doctor Faustus by Christopher Marlowe, adapted by Oakley Hall III	Peter Clough	Court Miller as Dr. Faustus, Winship Cook as Mephistophles, Michael J. Hume as Wagner. With James Goodwin Rice, Michael J. Hume, Mary Baird, Kristin Jolliff, Sigrid Heath, Robert Wright, Bruce Bouchard, Janni Brenn and Steven Rotblatt.	August 23-September 2	World premiere of this adaptation by Hall, who was injured a few weeks earlier. "The cast of twelve was headed by Court Miller in the role of John Faustus, whose command of the torn genius was simply electrifying." - Catskill Daily Mail.	
1978	Cabaret	The Seahorse by Edward J. Moore	Wendy Chapin	James Lee Wilson and Mary Baird	June 21 and 22		
1978	Barn Theatre	Bedtime Story by Sean O'Casey	Bruce Bouchard		June 30 and July 2	Featured at the Irish Folk Arts Festival in Leeds, NY on June 26.	
1978	Various, including Bardavon 1869 Opera House	The Fourposter by Jan de Hartog	Duncan Brine	James Goodwin Rice and Peggy Schoditsch	Duncan Brine, previously the artistic director of Princeton University's Theatre Intime, was a member of the LCT for three years before this production, his directorial debut.	An LCT upstate tour. "This is a nice introduction to an interesting theater company," said critic Jeffrey Borak. "Director Duncan Brine and his youthful cast--James Goodwin Rice and Peggy Schoditsch--have done a workmanlike job with the play: quietly competent if not always inspired."	

=== 1979 season ===
Season	Venue	Work performed	Director	Cast	Dates	Notes	Ref.
1979	Barn Theatre	The Country Wife by William Wycherley	Steven Rotblatt	Mary Baird, Peggy Schoditsch, James Goodwin Rice, Shaw Purnell, Daniel Schweid, Deborah Hedwall, Kristin Jolliff, Michael J. Hume.	June 13–24	"The plot is light-hearted and the characterizations superficial with the accent on wit and charm. As directed by Steven Rotblatt, the comedy really doesn't hit at consistent stride." - Martin P. Kelly, Albany Times Union Critic Dan DiNicola criticized the first act but thought the second contained some of the best comedy he had seen that year. "It is a rarity to see this most wonderful example of restoration theatre, another instance of Lexington's proclivity to present important plays which we might not otherwise see." "An extravaganza not to be missed." - Steve Peskin, Stamford Mirror Recorder. "...sheer magic," - The Times Record.	
1979	River Theatre	The Hot L Baltimore by Lanford Wilson	Bruce Bouchard	Kit Flanagan, Deborah Hedwall, Wesley John Rice, Kate Kelly, Naomi Riordan, Shaw Purnell, Daniel Schweid, Richard Zobel, Steven Rotblatt, Charles Losacco, Miriam Layn,	June–July 8	Bouchard had previously appeared in the 1975 Broadway production, in the role of Paul Grainger. Costumes by Nancy Haffner. Sets by Bruce Bouchard and Richard Zobel. "This Lexington production is as good as the best of summer theatre" - Dan DiNicola	
1979	Barn Theatre	The Philanthropist by Christopher Hampton	Wendy Chapin	Richard Gambe, Shaw Purnell, Kate Kelly, Michael J. Hume, Laralu Smith, Richard Zobel, Patricia Charbonneau	July 11–22	"Brilliantly executed," according to the Stamford Mirror Recorder. "...an intricate play in need of a more purposeful, confident style than it has found in this production. But there is some fine acting here, especially from Gambe and Miss Purnell. They alone are worth the admission price." - Poughkeepsie Journal "A solid cast of Equity actors is giving electric performances...Wendy Chapin's direction is close to perfection in fluidity, authenticity and timing." - C. Robie Booth. Dan DiNicola praised the performances and the direction of Wendy Chapin: "...the finest comedy of the summer season."	
1979	Barn Theatre	Marriage by Nikolai Gogol, adapted by Lev Shkhtman and Abraham Tetenbaum, with original music by George Andoniadis	Lev Shekhtman	Patricia Charbonneau, Michael J. Hume, Daniel Schweid, James Goodwin Rice, Naomi Riordan, J.L. Wilson, Wesley John Rice, Steven Rotblatt, Susan Smyth, Lynne Charnay, Nancy Haffner.	July 25-August 5	A substitution for a previously announced production of Want by Arthur John Morey. The production was director Lev Shekhtman's US debut. He met artistic director Abraham Tetenbaum in Rome, and this relationship brought him to Lexington. It also featured Broadway star Lynne Charnay, recently emerged from retirement. "Ambitious and brilliantly conceived"- Dan DiNicoloa. "Inspired performances by half a dozen players and brilliant direction...make "Marriage" at Lexington Conservatory Theatre a delightful institution."- Knickerbocker News. "Russian director Lev Shekhtman has gone deep beneath the surface of Gogol's work and created a frequently bizarre theatrical experience which veers--sometimes uncertainly, sometimes brilliantly--between farce of the grandest order and a discomforting expressionism." - Jeffrey Borak. Shehktman again directed his adaptation in 1982 at Theater in Action in New York.	
1979	Barn Theatre	The Good Woman of Setzuan by Bertolt Brecht, with original music by Philip Soltanoff	Barbara Rosoff	Janni Brenn, Cotter Smith, Susan Strickler, Roz Farinella, Richard Greene, Nancy Haffner, Randolph Gambelunghe, Michael J. Hume, Shaw Purnell, Mary Baird, Bruce Bouchard, Laralu Smith, James Wilson, Philip Soltanoff, James Goodwin Rice, Wesley John Rice, Susan Smyth, Steve Barney, Robert LeVoyd Wright, Peggy Schoditsch	August 8–19	Musical direction by Stephen Roylance. Set and lighting design by Dale Jordan and Leslie Taylor. Director Barbara Rosoff soon after became the artistic director of Portland Stage Company, serving from 1981-87.The Albany Times Union praised the directing, performances and the original musical score. The Knickerbocker News observed a departure from Brecht's typical somber tone, as "adroit, lively and sometimes almost irreverent."	
1979	Barn Theatre	Grinder's Stand by Oakley Hall III	Peter Clough	Court Miller as Meriwether Lewis, with Michael J. Hume, Richard Zobel, Sofia Landon, Richard Council, Red Sutton and Bruce Bouchard.	August 22 - September 2	World Premiere full production, funded in part by a grant from the National Endowment for the Arts and a writing fellowship from the Rockefeller Foundation.	
1979	Various venues in Greene, Delaware, Albany and Otsego counties	Endgame by Samuel Beckett	Louis Rackoff	starring Court Miller as Clov, Janni Brenn, James Lee Wilson and Susan Strickler	October 1979	An LCT Upstate Tour. Original music composed by George Andoniadis, costumes and sets by Leslie Taylor, lighting by Dale F. Jordan. "The acting as usual was of the highest professional caliber. However, this critic was disappointed in the choice of productions. The play was extremely intellectual, at times quite depressing, always stimulating but not the type of production that should be used to promote the L.C.T." - Steve Peskin, Stamford Mirror-Recorder	
1979	LCT Gala and Old Forge	Luv by Murray Schisgal	Daniel Schweid	James Goodwin Rice as Harry Berlin, with Steven Rotblatt and Deborah Hedwall	8/23/79 and 8/26/79	A benefit production for the LCT annual gala, with costumes by Nancy Haffner, sets by Geoffrey Hall and lighting by David Filkins	

=== 1980 season ===
Season	Venue	Work performed	Director	Cast	Dates	Notes	Ref.
1980	Barn Theatre	Let's Get a Divorce by Victorien Sardou and Émile de Najac, translated by	Peter Clough	Forbesy Russell, Stephen Nisbet, Ben Siegler, Richard Vincent Mazza, Sofia Landon, Kristin Jolliff, Steven Rotblatt, Steve Hytner, Chris Fracchiolla, Steve Barney, Joseph Quandt, Kim Ameen, Jeff Reade, Kay Stamer.	June 11–22	Reset in 1896 (instead of the play's original 1880) and evoking Art Nouveau, the production team included set designer Kenneth Doherty, costume designer Cynthia Waas and lighting designer Stephen Gerry. The cast includes Chris Facchiolla, later one of the co-creators of Tony n' Tina's Wedding It was also playwright Ben Siegler's first LCT production. "Thoroughly enjoyable and entertaining." - The Stamford Mirror Recorder. "Thanks to capable acting, precise direction and some of the company's best technical work, the troupe succeeds in turning in a solid effort. The only question is--does one want farce to be solid?" according to The Knickerbocker News "...its arguments and temperament are as fresh as today, especially in the bright, breezy and remarkably intelligent production the play is receiving at the Lexington Conservatory Theatre," said critic Jeffrey Borak.	
1980	Barn Theatre	Of Mice and Men by John Steinbeck, with original music by George Andoniadis	Bruce Bouchard	Michael J. Hume, Patricia Charbonneau, Richard Council, Steven Rotblatt, Richard Gambe, Michael Arkin, Stephen Nisbet, Chris Fracchiola, Ronald Larkin	June 25-July 6	Sets by Leslie Taylor and Dale F. Jordan. "Council is remarkable in a very tough role. Hume, with his Kirk Douglas profile, spiels a nonstop medley of honesty, common sense and love for Lennie," said the Old Dutch Post Star. "...LCT is the most dynamic, accomplished and professional theater in the Hudson Valley today."	
1980	Barn Theatre	Arlecchino Undone by Christopher Ceraso, music composed and performed by George Andoniadis	Gloria Muzio	Bruce Bouchard as Arlecchino, with Carla Meadows, Sofia Landon, Stephen Nisbet, Kristin Jolliff, Michael Arkin, and Michael J. Hume.	July 9–20	World premiere. Designed by Leslie Taylor and Dale F. Jordan. Later retitled A Fool's Errand, it received mixed reviews. The Daily Gazette noted the talent of the playwright despite struggling with the cerebral nature of the work, and praised the performance of Carla Meadow. "Alone, her performances approach brilliance." "Classics like "Of Mice and Men" and "Dr. Faustus" will remain as touchstones for those who saw them, but this new play seems to be what theater in Lexington, and everywhere else for that matter, is all about," said The Old Dutch Post Star. "It's that good a play."	
1980	Barn Theatre	Joe Egg by Peter Nichols	B. Rodney Marriott	James Goodwin Rice, Deborah Hedwall, Sofia Landon, Richard Gambe, Sarah Melici, Jennifer Skurnik	July 23-August 3	"Wildly funny, deeply moving, at times bitter and intense," according to the Poughkeepsie Journal. The Knickerbocker News praised the theatre's "artistic courage"... "sensitive, human, and surprisingly humorous." "Thanks mostly to the brilliantly vibrant performances of James Goodwin Rice and Deborah Hedwall, the Lexington production quivers with authenticity." - Dan DiNicola. This production was director B. Rodney Marriott's first and only work for the company, though he directed the same production in December of the same year, when the company moved to Albany as Capital Repertory Theatre. Marriott died in Calcutta in 1990.	
1980	Barn Theatre	A Midsummer Night's Dream by William Shakespeare, with original music by Philip Soltanoff	Michael J. Hume	Richard Gambe, Court Miller, Kit Flanagan, Wesley John Rice, Nancy Haffner, Patricia Charbonnea, Cotter Smith, Chris Fracchiolla, Bruce Bouchard, Steve Hytner, Steve Barney and Mairy Baird.	August 6–17	Set in pre-Hellenic Greece. Costumes by Lloyd Waiwaiole. Set design by Geoffrey Hall. "Sex sounds fill the woods of Athens, so loud as to almost drown out the sounds of true love as spoken by the Athenian couples: grunts, hoarse sighs, sharp animal cries, challenges and mating calls,"—T.H. Littlefield. "The Lexington version...emphasizes the sensual, dark and barbaric undercurrents that may be found in the work." - The Knickerbocker News	
1980	Barn Theatre	Close Ties by Elizabeth Diggs	Barbara Rosoff	Sofia Landon as Eveyln, Margaret Barker as Josephine, Janni Brenn as Anna, John Griesemer as Ira, Laralu Smith as Connie, Eric Schiff as Thayer, Eloise Iliff as Bess, and Joel Parsons as Watson. With set design and lighting by Dale F. Jordan and Leslie Taylor.	August 20–31	World premiere. The Knickerbocker News described it as "...beautiful, touching, gentle and heartwarming."	
1980	Various, including venues in Middleburgh, Sharon Springs, Catskil, Albany and Cohoes Music Hall	Two for the Seesaw by William Gibson	Barbara Rosoff	Kit Flanagan as Gittel and James Rebhorn as Jerry Ryan.	April–May 1980	A bittersweet comedy about a miss-matched romance between a modern dancer and a Nebraska lawyer in New York City. An LCT Upstate Tour, managed by Kathy Angus.	

=== PROVOS series 1976-1980 ===
Season	Venue	Work performed	Director	Cast	Dates	Notes	Ref.
1976	River Theatre	Frankenstein by Oakley Hall III				Reading of play, produced later that season.	
1976	River Theatre	An Evening with a Great Lady of the Silver Screen by Otis Bigelow					
1976	River Theatre	Portrait of a Lady adapted by Oakley Hall					
1976	River Theatre	Kid Champion by Thomas Babe					
1976	River Theatre	In Search of the Lost Triad by Mariquita Platov					
1977	River Theatre	Ubu Rex by Alfred Jarry, translated by Oakley Hall III	Oakley Hall III	Richard Zobel, Steven Rotblatt, Steven Patterson, Winship Cook, Oakley Hall III	June 5, July 27	Stage managed by Wendy Chapin, with lighting by Linnaea Tillett and music by Axel Gros. Previously produced with substantially the same personnel in December 1976 in New York City.	
1977	River Theatre	The Prevalence of Mrs. Seale by Otis Bigelow					
1977	River Theatre	Doorman, Cash and Mental Health by Oakley Hall III		Susanne Marley		Subsequently produced at New Stage Works in NYC.	
1977	Mark Rothko Carriage House, NYC	Eclipse by Paul Auster	Michael Van Landingham	Larry C. Lott, Steven Rottblat, Michael Hartman		Auster's first play. Subsequently re-written and re-titled Laurel and Hardy Go to Heaven	
1977	River Theatre	Beatrice and the Old Man by Oakley Hall III	Oakley Hall III	Susanne Marley		A staged reading. Subsequently produced in 1978 at LCT, where it was directed by Wendy Chapin.	
1977	River Theatre	Lazarus' Cue by Mariquita Platov	Mary Hall	Steven Rotblatt, Kristin Joliff, Mary Baird, Kenneth Weisbarth, Tony Cummings, Sands Hall, Lilian Zenker, Axel Gros	August 8	World premiere. Interpretation of the biblical characters of Lazarus and Mary Magdalene, presenting Magdalene in four different modes/contexts. Songs by Gwendolyn Belle, Josephine Feagley, Keith Bradley, Joseph Duchac. Sound by Axel Gros.	
1977	River Theatre	Play Strindberg by Friedrich Durrenmatt	Steven Rotblatt	Seekin Dalyte, Clara Marm and Christopher Venom	August 26 and 27		
1978	River Theatre	Nesting by Christopher Ceraso	Gloria Muzio	cast	July 5 and July 7	The story of a young man who declines to go to Vietnam. A play reading	
1978	River Theatre	Grinder's Stand by Oakley Hall III	Peggy Schoditsch	Court Miller as Meriwether Lewis	July 18 and 21	A play reading, exploring the last days of Meriwether Lewis, previously read at Phoenix Theatre in New York City. Produced the following year at LCT.	
1978	River Theatre	Meg by Paula Vogel	Peter Clough	cast	August 1 and 4	A play reading, based upon the life of Sir Thomas More and his daughter Meg.	
1978	River Theatre	The Revengers based upon The Revenger's Tragedy by Cyril Tourneur, adapted by William C. Sandwick and Philip Soltanoff, music composed by Philip Soltanoff	William Sandwick	Stephen Burleigh, Steve Nisbet, Sigrid Heath, Edward Coiro, Richard Gambe, Sofia Landon, David Schweid, Patrica Charbonneau and Michael J. Hume	August 15 and 18	A workshop production. Subsequently produced by the company in NYC.	
1978	River Theatre	The Unicorns by Otis Bigelow	Oakley Hall III		August 29 and 31	A play reading, not listed in the LCT production history page, but listed in the LCT flyer and announcement materials. "An erie, dramatic adventure story of the far future," according to the press release.	
1978	River Theatre	Toad by Gerald Locklin and George Carroll	Michael Van Landingham	Susan Smyth	August 30 and September 1	A play reading. Subsequent productions retitled The Toad Poems, based on the life and work of poet Gerald Locklin.	
1978	River Theatre	The Father Play by George Carroll					
1978	River Theatre	Surgical Theatre by Abraham Tetenbaum				Alternative title: The Magical Tragical Surgical Theater of Dr. J. Marion Sims - also received staged readings at the New York Shakespeare Festival Public Theater and Circle-in-the-Square/Broadway.	
1979		The Wager by Mark Medoff	Wendy Chapin	Steve Hytner, Steve Barney, Chris Fracchiolla, Jeri Jackson		A special production by LCT interns. Hytner, later to find success as a guest star on Seinfeld, joined LCT in 1978 as a technical assistant. His first main stage appearances for the company were in the 1980 season productions of "Let's Get A Divorce" and "A Midsummer Night's Dream". He went on to appear in the Capital Rep production of The Tavern following the 1980 LCT season.	
1979	River Theatre	Occultation and Lumification of Mr. Ubu by Oakley Hall III	Wendy Chapin		6/17/79, 6/19/79	Two performances, 52 attendees. Alternatively titled Mr. Ubu	
1979	River Theatre	Beggar's Choice by Kathleen Betsko	Susan Smyth		7/1/79 and 7/3/79	Two performances, 70 attendees. Was recognized by the National Playwrights Conference in 1978 and the first act was later adapted for NPR's Earplay. A co-production of the Women of the League of Theatre Artists.	
1979	River Theatre	Scooter Thomas Makes it to the Top of the World by Peter Parnell	Sheldon Larry		7/15/79 and 7/17/79	Two performances, 91 attendees. Director Sheldon Larry directed the world premiere of Parnell's Sorrows of Stephen a few months later at the Public Theatre.	
1979	River Theatre	Remains to be Seen by Ramona Moon (Christine Hayes)	Susan Smyth	Steve Barney as Archimedes, Susan Smyth	7/20/79 and 7/21/79	Two performances, 86 attendees	
1979	River Theatre	Cawdor (adaptation)			7/29/79 and 7/31/79	Two performances, 51 attendees	
1979	River Theatre	Drinking Man's Comedy			8/12/79 and 8/14/79	Two performances, 70 attendees	
1979	River Theatre	My Sister in this House by Wendy Kesselman			7/30/79 and 8/1/79	Two performances, 86 attendees. Subsequently produced at Actors Theatre of Louisville, Second Stage (NYC), helping launch the career of LCT member Patricia Charbonneau	
1979	River Theatre	Untitled			8/15/79 and 8/16/79	Two performances, 69 attendees	
1979	River Theatre	John Wilkes Booth Dreaming by Cotter Smith and Christian Horn		Cotter Smith as John Wilkes Booth, Stephen Roylance as Davey	8/17/79 and 8/18/79. Two performances, 91 attendees	Subsequently produced at Second Stage, Manhattan Theater Club	
1979	River Theatre	The Incredible Standing Man and His Friends by Dennis J. Reardon			8/27/79 and 8/28/79	Two performances, 60 attendees	
1979	River Theatre	Summer Repairs by Alexander Vampilov, adapted by Abraham Tetenbaum				A reading. One of two Russian adaptations Tetenbaum worked on that summer, with Lev Shekhtman and Lynne Charnay serving as translators.	
1979	River Theatre	Want by Arthur John Morey				Tetenbaum recalls this being a reading and that Morey was there. Morey does not recall.	
1980	River Theatre	Goodbye Freddy by Elizabeth Diggs			8/24/80 and 8/27/80, Two performances, 28 attendees		
1980	River Theatre	Robin Hood by Daniel Friedman			6/29/80, 7/2/80	Two performances, 27 attendees	
1980	River Theatre	Sons of Tushy by Steven Rotblatt			7/13/80, 7/16/80	Two performances, 10 attendees. Also spelled Sons of Tuschy in a later program listing.	
1980	River Theatre	More Interesting Than Either Sex by various			7/14/80, 7/15/80	An ensemble theatre piece based on the work of gay and lesbian poets, including Judy Grahn, Edward Field, Audre Lorde, Marilyn Hacker, Ian Young, Lynn Lonidier, and Ernest Hood. Two performances, 52 attendees. Previously received a reading at New York Shakespeare Festival, May 5, 1980. Subsequently produced at Washington Studio Arena.	
1980	River Theatre	Growing Pains by Ben Siegler			7/27/80 and 7/30/80	Two performances, 60 attendees. Listed in the 1980 brochure as Used Parts by Ben Siegler	
1980	River Theatre	Never Part from Your Loved Ones by Aleksandr Volodin			8/12/80	One performance, 20 attendees	
1980	River Theatre	Saturday Night Special by Monte Merrick		Mary Baird	8/11/80 and 8/13/80	Two performances, 15 attendees. Subsequently produced at Direct Theatre, NYC.	
1980	River Theatre	Then There Were Six			8/24/80 and 8/27/80	Two performances, 29 attendees	

=== Off-Off Broadway productions ===
Season	Venue	Work performed	Director	Cast	Dates	Notes	Ref.
1976	Hansen Galleries	Ubu Rex adapted by Oakley Hall III	Oakley Hall III	Richard Zobel, Michael Griffin, Steven Patterson, Joseph Lyons, Oakley Hall III	December 10-?	A new translation, produced by Richard Zobel and Linnaea Tillett, assisted by Mary Hall, in association with Ken Hansen and Joyce Herman. Music by Joseph Lyons, lighting by Seth Tillett, masks designed and built by Richard Zobel. Later produced at LCT in 1977 and by Firlefanz Puppets in Albany, NY in 2009.	
1977	International Community Center, 931 First Avenue, NYC	Hail Scrawdyke by David Halliwell	Oakley Hall III	Michael J. Hume as Scrawdyke, with Deborah Hedwall, Steven Nisbet, Kevin O'Brien and Richard Zobel.	January 13–16, 20-23 and 27-30, 1977.	Produced by Christopher Cade. "Very funny, and very destructive," according to the director, who recalled a captivating performance by Michael Hume as Scrawdyke. The production emphasized the thick accents of northern England. "The acting...makes this show a winner." - Show Business. "An impressive young group," according to Wisdom's Child. "Artistic director Oakley Hall III has trimmed he excess verbal fat off the play, and mounted a production full of directorial invention, travesty and high energy."	
1978	Playwrights Horizons	The Revengers based upon The Revenger's Tragedy by Cyril Tourneur by Cyril Tourneur, adapted by William C. Sandwick and Philip Soltanoff, music composed by Philip Soltanoff	William C. Sandwick	Stephen Burleigh, Steve Nisbet, Sigrid Heath, Edward Coiro, Richard Gambe, Sofia Landon, David Schweid, Patrica Charbonneau and Michael J. Hume	September 1978	Produced by LCT and Joseph Kavanagh, with choreography by Joya Granbery Hoyt, set and costumes by Steve Nisbet and Susan Smyth, lighting by Linnaea Tillet and Barbara Emily Tulliver.	

=== WLTA series ===
Season	Venue	Work performed	Director	Cast	Dates	Notes	Ref.
1979	New York Stageworks	Meat for the Crazies by Berrilla Kerr	Thomas Gruenewald	Mary Baird, Richard Gambe, Sands Hall, Michael Hume, Sofia Landon, Susanne Marley, Court Miller, Mark Nelson, Laralu Smith, James Wilson	March 19	a production of WLTA, Women of the League of Theatre Artists, Inc.	
1979	NYU School of the Arts	Retake by María Irene Fornés	Barbara Rosoff			a production of WLTA, Women of the League of Theatre Artists, Inc.	
