= The Loss of Nameless Things =

- Directed by: Bill Rose
- Produced by: Bill Rose
- Cinematography: Bill Bishop, Mickey Freeman, Jerry Slick
- Edited by: Rick LeCompte
- Music by: Joan Jeanrenaud, Barney Jones
- Release date: March 7, 2004
- Running time: 103 minutes
- Country: United States
- Language: English

The Loss of Nameless Things is a 2004 documentary feature film directed by Bill Rose. It tells the story of playwright Oakley Hall III, from his early life, founding of Lexington Conservatory Theatre, the traumatic brain injury that effectively ended his career, and his subsequent journey to building a new life.

== Production ==
Director Bill Rose began his career as an independent filmmaker in the 1970s, before leaving Los Angeles for the Bay Area and spending the 1980s and 90s producing corporate marketing films. Rose was wanting to return to his artistic roots when he met Hall in 2002, through Hall's brother in law Louis B. Jones, who sometimes collaborated with Rose. He learned that the Foothill Theatre Company in Nevada City had received a National Endowment for the Arts grant to produce Hall's Grinder's Stand and brought a camera to a rehearsal. Without a script and unsure of where the story would lead, Rose and his team recorded 200 hours of footage and let the process take them on a journey before editing down to a feature length. To finance the production, he sold a house.

Rose initially thought the story would focus on what happened the night Hall fell from the bridge, but changed his mind after meeting Hall. "It quickly became apparent to me that it didn't matter what happened," Rose told SFGate. "To me, the story was really Oakley's fall from grace and his embrace of this new life. Putting one foot in front of the other all those years."

The first cut of the film was five hours long, followed by a three hour version, until it was edited to a final run time of 103 minutes.

Interviewees include novelist Blair Fuller, father Oakley Hall, sister Sands Hall, Lexington Conservatory alumni Sofia Landon Geier, Bruce Bouchard, Richard Zobel, Stephen Nisbet, Deborah Headwall, Ramona Moon, Michael Hume and Patricia Charbonneau, and poet Molly Fisk. Hall's ex-wife Mary declined to participate.

The title of the film is a quote from a passage from Hall's play Grinder's Stand.

== Synopsis ==
Oakley Hall III, the playwright son of prominent novelist Oakley Hall, emerges as a charismatic and sometimes rebellious writer and theatre artist, attending UC Irvine and Boston University. In 1976, he co-founds Lexington Conservatory Theatre at Lexington House in the Catskill mountains.

The first seasons of the company merit acclaim and increased expectations. Amidst rising career pressure, the responsibilities of marriage and family dosed with excessive drinking, Hall falls from a nearby bridge, suffering a traumatic brain injury. After months in hospital, he is released, but he finds he cannot return to his previous life. Subsequent years spent living in upstate New York, Ohio and the midwest find him working odd jobs and struggling to find himself.

In 2002, a small theatre company in Nevada City begins work to mount a production of Grinder's Stand, his last completed play. Returning to California, Hall begins to build a new life for himself. He returns to writing with a novel that mixes fictional autobiography of Alfred Jarry with memoir from Hall himself.

== Release ==
The film premiered on March 7, 2004, at the San Jose Cinequest Film & Creativity Festival. It played at Cleveland International Film Festival, Silverdocs Film Festival, Austin Film Festival and Sedona International Film Festival, among others. It won four awards for Best Documentary on the festival circuit.

On February 28, 2006, the film was broadcast nationally as an extended-length episode of the PBS program Independent Lens.

== Reception ==
"Beautiful and compelling," said critic Richard von Busack, "one of the highlights of this year's Cinequest." The Los Angeles Times described it as "a documentary as eloquent as its title." Variety noted the film's penchant for melodrama, but praised its compelling story and Catskill cinematography. "...the undeniable fascination of such live-fast, burnout-young life sagas holds attention even when pic dawdles." American Theatre described its PBS premiere as "a poignant tragedy of the almost." Critic Fred LeBrun, who knew Hall from his Lexington days as "a character who was bright as hell but living in damnation at the same time," observed that Hall had finally found peace with himself. The Sante Fe New Mexican, in a favorable review, also noted that Hall remained an enduring inspiration to his former company members.

"It's an amazing story," Hall told the Albany Times Union. "I've seen it three times, and it makes me almost cry. I'm watching a story about me, but it's like it's somebody else, it's a me I don't remember being."

== Legacy ==
=== Theatrical revivals ===
The documentary spurred increased interest in Hall's work, with productions of Grinder's Stand in Kansas, North Dakota and Catskill's Bridge Street Theatre. His adaptation of Frankenstein was produced in Cleveland and Connecticut.

Hall returned to theatre himself in 2010, directing his translation of Ubu Rex in Albany, NY.

=== Proposed feature film ===
In 2009, writer and director Fred Dekker said in an interview that he had been approached to write and direct a feature film about Hall, based upon the documentary. "I think the script is the best thing I have ever done," Dekker said.

In 2013, producer Curtis Burch announced he was developing the feature film project, and hoped it would go into production in 2014.

== Home media ==
The Loss of Nameless Things was released on DVD in 2009.
