= Torch Song Trilogy =

Collection of three plays by Harvey Fierstein

- Broadway promotional poster
- Original language: English
- Written by: Harvey Fierstein
- Characters: Arnold Beckoff; Ed; Lady Blues; Mrs. Beckoff; Alan; David; Laurel
- Genre: Drama
- Setting: 1970s, 1980s New York City

Premiere
- Date: January 15, 1982
- Place: Actors' Playhouse, Greenwich Village, New York City

Torch Song Trilogy is a collection of three plays by Harvey Fierstein rendered in three acts: International Stud, Fugue in a Nursery, and Widows and Children First! The story centers on Arnold Beckoff, a Jewish homosexual, drag queen, and torch singer who lives in New York City in the late 1970s and early 1980s. The four-hour play begins with a soliloquy in which he explains his cynical disillusionment with love.

== Characters ==
- Lady Blues: a character who appears between scenes in International Stud. According to Fierstein’s stage directions, she is to be “dressed in period, [singing] a torch song in the manner of Helen Morgan or Ruth Etting."
- Arnold Beckoff: the central character of the play. In the stage directions, Fierstein playfully describes him as a "kvetch (someone who complains habitually) of great wit and want."
- Ed Reiss: Arnold’s bisexual lover and friend. He is “thirty-five [and] very handsome.”
- Young Stud: a young man who Arnold hooks up with in the backroom of the International Stud. He has no speaking lines.
- Laurel: Ed’s lover and eventual fiancee.
- Alan: Arnold’s young lover, who is beaten to death by a group of homophobic boys.
- David Beckoff: Arnold’s 15-year old adopted son, “a wonderfully bright and handsome boy.”
- Ma: Arnold’s extremely strict, traditional Jewish mother. She is around 60.

== Summary ==
Each act focuses on a different phase in Arnold's life. In the first, Arnold meets Ed Reiss, who is uncomfortable with his bisexuality. This becomes an increasing source of conflict between the two, causing Ed to eventually leave Arnold and settle down with a woman named Laurel. Arnold is heartbroken because he still loves Ed. In the second, one year later, Arnold meets Alan, and the two settle down into a blissful existence that includes plans to adopt a child. The couple visits Ed and Laurel in their country home, where the group deals with tensions resulting from Ed and Arnold’s previous relationship. The segment ends with Laurel telling Arnold she and Ed are engaged. In the third, several years later, Arnold is a single father raising gay teenager David. It is revealed that just before receiving David from the state, Alan was the victim of a violent hate crime, resulting in his death and leaving Arnold to raise a child on his own. Ed is separated from Laurel, and stays at Arnold’s to help him. The play revolves around Arnold’s struggle to move on following Alan’s death as he is forced to deal with his mother's ("Ma") intolerance and disrespect when she visits from Florida.

The first act derives its name (International Stud) from an actual gay bar of the same name at 117 Perry Street in Greenwich Village in the 1960s and 1970s. The bar had a backroom where men engaged in anonymous sex. The backroom plays a central role in the act. The trilogy derives its title from the “torch” musical style which are “popular sentimental song[s] of unrequited love.”

The award-winning and popular work broke new ground in the theatre: "At the height of the post-Stonewall clone era, Harvey challenged both gay and straight audiences to champion an effeminate gay man's longings for love and family."

== Production history ==
The first staging of International Stud opened on February 2, 1978, at La MaMa, E.T.C., an off-off-Broadway theater, where it ran for two weeks. The off-Broadway production opened on May 22, 1978, at the Players Theatre, where it ran for 72 performances.

The first staging of Fugue in a Nursery opened at LaMama on February 1, 1979.

Torch Song Trilogy first opened at the uptown Richard Allen Center on October 16, 1981, produced by The Glines. On January 15, 1982, it transferred to the Actors' Playhouse in Greenwich Village, where it ran for 117 performances, produced by The Glines. The cast included Fierstein as Arnold, Joel Crothers as Ed, Paul Joynt as Alan, Matthew Broderick as David, Diane Tarleton as Laurel/Lady Blues and Estelle Getty as Mrs. Beckoff.

The Broadway production, directed by Peter Pope, opened on June 10, 1982, at the Little Theatre, where it ran for 1,222 performances and 8 previews. Fierstein, Joynt, Tarleton, and Getty were joined by Court Miller as Ed and Fisher Stevens as David and Susan Edwards as Lady Blues. Later in the run, David Garrison and Jonathan Hadary portrayed Arnold, Craig Sheffer was cast as Alan, and Barbara Barrie replaced Getty.

The play won Fierstein two Tony Awards, for Best Play (with John Glines' historic Tony speech that acknowledged his lover and co-producer Larry Lane) and Best Actor in Play; two Drama Desk Awards, for Outstanding New Play and Outstanding Actor in a Play; and the Theatre World Award.

Torch Song Trilogy went on national tour in 1983, first arriving in San Francisco before continuing to Los Angeles in November, where it played until June 1984. Getty joined the Los Angeles cast and left before continuing to the next stop to audition for and act in Golden GIrls. The tour marked the debut of Patrick Dempsey, who had dropped out of his senior year of high school for the tour.

The West End production starring Antony Sher, with Barbara Rosenblat, Rupert Frazer (Ed), Belinda Sinclair (Laurel), Rupert Graves (Alan), Ian Sears (David) and Miriam Karlin (Mrs Beckoff) for Albery Theatre production of Torch Song Trilogy, 1985, cast list. It opened on October 1, 1985, at Albery Theatre on St. Martin's Lane, where it ran for slightly more than seven months. Sher left the production before the play closed, and Fierstein filled-in for the role that earned him a Tony. Sher later said. "his was a real Broadway-sized, scenery-eating, audience-eating, giant performance – I can understand that he might have found mine a bit restrained."

In 2006, the 25th anniversary production of Torch Song Trilogy was produced by the Gallery Players in Brooklyn; Harvey Fierstein was one of the founding members of the Players. Seth Rudetsky played Arnold in the production, directed by Stephen Nachamie.

In late January 2009, it was revived at the American Theatre of Actors Sargent Theatre in New York City, by Black Henna Productions. Directed by Malini Singh McDonald, the production ran as a limited engagement until February 1, 2009, with each act being performed separately on weeknights and the entire series running on Saturdays and Sundays. The cast featured Cas Marino as Arnold, Ian M. McDonald as Ed, Susan Erenberg as Lady Blues, Christian Thomas as Alan, Amie Backner as Laurel, Chris Kelly as David, and Mary Lynch as Mrs. Beckoff.

The play was also revived at the Menier Chocolate Factory in London in 2012, with David Bedella playing Arnold.

Torch Song Trilogy was produced by The Studio Theatre in Washington, D.C., as part of its subscription series in September and October 2013. It was directed by Michael Kahn, artistic director of The Shakespeare Theatre, also in Washington, D.C.

In the fall of 2017, a significantly revised version of the play, cut down by Fierstein from its original four-plus hours to two hours and forty-five minutes and retitled simply Torch Song, was produced Off Broadway by Second Stage Theatre, with Michael Urie as Arnold and Mercedes Ruehl as Mrs. Beckoff, and directed by Moises Kaufman. In October 2018, the Urie-led production transferred to the Hayes Theater on Broadway. The revival-transfer had its first preview on October 9, 2018, and had its opening performance on November 1, 2018. The production had its final performance on January 6, 2019, playing 26 previews and 77 regular performances.

In December 2018 (shortly before closing), the producers of the Broadway revival led by Richie Jackson announced a national tour starting in late 2019 at the Center Theater Group in Los Angeles, starring Michael Urie as Arnold Beckoff. In London in 2019, the full three-act play was the first production in the Turbine Theatre’s inaugural season, opening on August 22. It was presented by Bill Kenwright and ran until October 13.

On January 25th, 2022, a new production in Spanish opened at Teatro Milan, in Mexico City. This currently running production is led by award winning actors Rogelio Suarez as Arnold and Anahi Allue as Ma. It is directed by Alejandro Vilallobos in his directorial debut and produced by Gabriel Guevara; the cast included Jose Peralta as David.

Hoboken Library produced a staged reading of 'Torch Song Trilogy: Widows And Children First’ on August 28th, 2021. It featured NYC cabaret luminary Sidney Myer as Arnold, Florence Pape as Mrs. Beckoff, Michael Stever as Ed, Logann Grayce as David and was directed by Ethan Galvin.

== Casts ==
Character	Off-Broadway (1981)	Broadway (1982)	West End (1985)	25th Anniversary (2006)	Washington, D.C. (2013)	Off-Broadway (2017)	Broadway (2018)
Arnold Beckoff	Harvey Fierstein	Harvey Fierstein	Antony Sher	Seth Rudetsky	Brandon Uranowitz	Michael Urie	Michael Urie
Ed	Joel Crothers	Court Miller	Rupert Frazer	Brad Thomason	Todd Lawson	Ward Horton	Ward Horton
Alan	Paul Joynt	Paul Joynt	Rupert Graves	Andy Phelan	Alex Mills	Michael Hsu Rosen	Michael Hsu Rosen
David	Matthew Broderick	Fisher Stevens	Ian Sears	Marc Tumminelli	Michael Lee Brown	Jack DiFalco	Jack DiFalco
Laurel	Diane Tarleton	Diane Tarleton	Belinda Sinclair	Andrea Wollenberg	Sarah Grace Wilson	Roxanna Hope Radja	Roxanna Hope Radja
Lady Blues	Diane Tarleton	Sue Edwards	Barbara Rosenblat	Yolanda Batts	Ashleigh King	—N/a	—N/a
Ma Beckoff	Estelle Getty	Estelle Getty Barbara Barrie	Miriam Karlin	Laura Raines	Gordana Rashovich	Mercedes Ruehl	Mercedes Ruehl

== Reception and impact ==
International Stud first premiered in 1978 at La MaMa, where Fierstein made his professional acting debut in Andy Warhol's play Pork in 1971. Fierstein has spoken about the difficulty he faced as an openly gay playwright. In an archived 1982 interview with Playbill republished to commemorate the show’s anniversary, he reminisced on the attitude producers and critics took towards his work: “Fabulous writer. Fabulous play. But gay. Goodbye.” Mel Gussow of The New York Times panned the play as a "sincere but sentimentalized view of a transvestite extremes." Despite the criticism, Ellen Stewart, founder of La MaMa, chose to produce A Fugue in the Nursery and Widows and Children First! in 1979, though she personally found the work "too talky." The Glines, a nonprofit organization dedicated to forwarding gay-themed cultural endeavors, financially supported Fierstein in reworking the three one-act plays as a singular theatrical event, which became Torch Song Trilogy and earned excited praise from Mel Gussow. "Arnold's story becomes richer as it unfolds," he wrote, saying that Fierstein's performance "[was] an act of compelling virtuosity."

Writing in The Boston Phoenix, Don Shewey declared that "the trilogy proves to be a masterpiece — it’s gay theater's gift to American drama." He observed that the trilogy presents "gay life not as an isolated phenomenon but in constant relation to the society at large, a society whose sexual values have undergone a general upheaval, leaving everyone — gays and straights alike — struggling to learn the new rules." Shewey concluded by stating that while Torch Song Trilogy raises many questions, "it doesn’t provide answers — only a model of how to come to terms with our common struggle for self-acceptance and (above all) love."

Theatre scholar Jordan Schildcrout notes that some critics viewed Torch Song Trilogy as "the most truly conservative play to come along in years" because of its focus on "fidelity and family" (Jack Kroll), while others declared the play a radical breakthrough because of its forthright depiction of gay sexuality, gay youth, and gay families during an era of political backlash against the gay rights movement. Today, the play is primarily remembered as a groundbreaking moment for LGBTQ theatre. It is lauded for touching on issues such as gay marriage and adoption before they were mainstream. In a 2018 review revisiting the play, PopMatters writer Elizabeth Woronzoff remarked that Torch Song Trilogy laid the groundwork for many modern queer television shows such as Queer as Folk, Modern Family, and Will and Grace.

Additionally, the play addressed intersectionality in a newfound way. The inclusion of both the Jewish and queer identities allowed for the representation and (arguably) rejection of the stereotypes associated with each group. According to critic John Simon in a critique published in New York Magazine, the play highlights both the Jewish, melancholic humor and homosexual, flamboyant humor. Still, Simon argues that Fierstein rejects the common stereotypes of both identities and incites the audience to practice "warm empathy" towards every character.

== Film adaptation ==
Fierstein adapted his play for a feature film, released in 1988. It was directed by Paul Bogart and starred Fierstein (Arnold), Anne Bancroft (Ma Beckoff), Matthew Broderick (Alan), Brian Kerwin (Ed), and Eddie Castrodad (David).

== Awards and nominations ==
=== Awards ===
- 1983 Drama Desk Award for Outstanding New Play
- 1983 Drama Desk Award for Outstanding Actor in a Play (Harvey Fierstein)
- 1983 Tony Award for Best Play (Harvey Fierstein)
- 1983 Tony Award for Best Performance by a Leading Actor in a Play (Harvey Fierstein)

=== Nominations ===
- 1982 Drama Critics' Circle Award Runner-Up Best American Play
