= Lexington House =

- U.S. National Register of Historic Places
- Location within New York Location within the United States
- Location: NY 42, Lexington, New York
- Coordinates: 42°14′23″N 74°22′0″W
- Area: 2.2 acres (0.89 ha)
- Built: 1883
- Architect: Campbell, Jerome
- Architectural style: Stick/Eastlake, Italianate
- NRHP reference No.: 86002175
- Added to NRHP: September 4, 1986

Lexington House is a historic former riverfront hotel located in Catskill Park on the south side of the Schoharie Creek in the Town of Lexington in Greene County, New York.

Lexington House was designed by local architect Jerome Campbell and built for John P. Van Valkenburg in 1883 as a middle class resort. It features Italianate and Eastlake design elements. Listed on the National Register of Historic Places in 1986, it is notable for its historic features and for its long history in arts and professional theatre. "On the opposite side of the lake is the new Lexington House," said a newspaper account in 1886. "So complete in all its appointments and whose imposing structure viewed from across the water lends enchantment to the eye."

Also on the property is the Morse Inn (c. 1881), a former ice house (c. 1900), wagon house (c. 1883) and shed (c. 1900). The River Theater (c. 1887) stood on the property until about 2011 when it was severely damaged.

== Construction and notable features ==
Its construction coinciding with the development of the Catskill and Tannersville Railway, the Lexington House is a rare surviving example of mid-scale, railroad-era resort architecture. The Lexington House, featuring thirty rooms, advertised facilities for 50-60 guests. Architecturally, the Lexington House embodies a variety of distinctive characteristics commonly associated with this type of resort architecture.

On the exterior, the most salient features associated with the type are the broad verandah and second-story balconies. Expansive porches and open-air balconies were an essential feature of the resort hotel, providing guests with vistas of the surrounding wilderness and pleasant public spaces for social gatherings. Verandahs also served as sanitary and therapeutic retreats from which to enjoy the healthful and moral atmosphere of nature, reflecting the popularity of resorts not only for pleasure and recreational activity but also for escapes from the crowded, disease-ridden and immoral conditions of the suddenly industrialized cities of the northeast.

Lexington House (1883)

The interior of Lexington House illustrates the typical plan of the mid-scale resort hotel. The ground floor, still virtually intact in spatial configuration and restrained architectural detailing, provided large public spaces for a variety of reception and entertainment uses. No late-nineteenth century resort hotel was complete without a ballroom.

According to information currently available, dances were initially held in the sitting parlor and/or dining area of the main house. Dances were held in the River Theater following its completion in approximately 1887. Guest rooms, still intact, flank long corridors along the second and third stories, amply ventilated with movable transoms and numerous windows.

Lexington House was particularly progressive for its time, featuring an elaborate system of gas lighting throughout the building and fire-stop framing between the wall cavities and dwelling units. Shared sanitary facilities were located at convenient locations on each floor (modern plumbing was installed in the 1930s). The rear wings and dependencies housed the support facilities for the hotel (laundry, kitchen, storage and ice house) while the various outbuildings provided facilities for resort-related activities. The large wagon house provided livery services for the guests, while the River Theater provided space for local performers and traveling opera, melodrama and vaudeville companies as well as dancing. (A theater was, like the ballroom, an essential component of the Catskill resort experience. Evers, et alia, p. 23). [T]he Lexington House was, according to a number of late-nineteenth century accounts, considered to be one of the finest, most popular resorts of the period, offering a broad range of entertainment and activity.

== Camp Lexington ==
In 1931, after operating as a hotel for seven years, owners Sam and Esther Doctorow converted the house into Camp Lexington, a camp for children with a focus on theatre arts. Their daughter Evelyn Weisberg and her husband Hy, over the next decades, became the primary managers of the programming. In the early 50s, the family purchased the adjacent 145-acre farm to expand the camp. In 1973, as the camp activities declined, it was rebranded as Art Awareness, a not-for-profit artists retreat. A year later, Weisberg met a group of young actors seeking to start a theatre company and invited them to take residence at Lexington House and its surrounding facilities. The artists spent the next several summers renovating the property to accommodate the new company.

== Lexington Conservatory Theatre ==
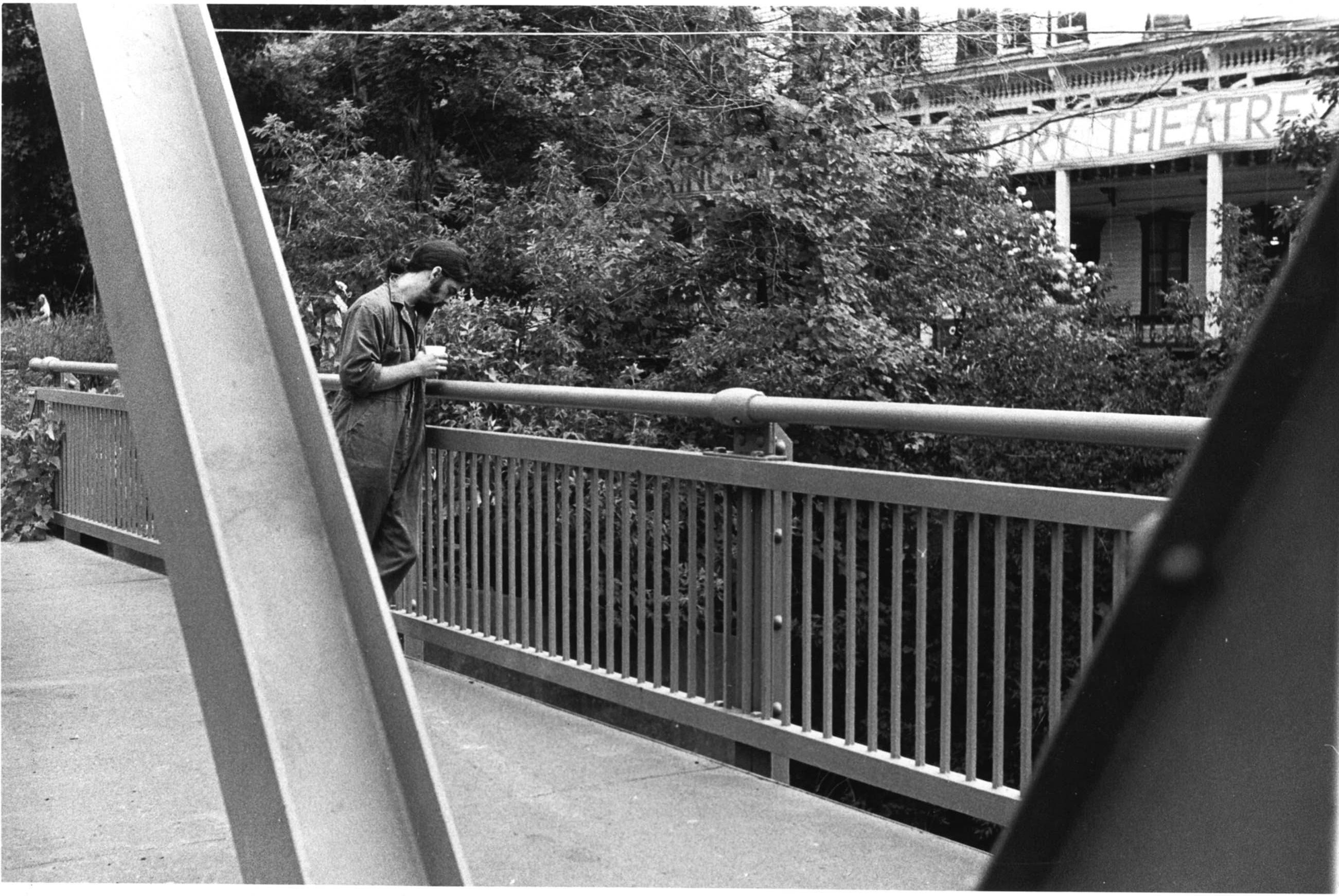
Playwright Oakley Hall III on the Rt 42 Bridge in Lexington, NY

Let by artistic director Oakley Hall III, Lexington Conservatory Theatre launched its first season at Lexington House in summer 1976, the same year that John Margolies photographed it. In 1978, Hall suffered a traumatic brain injury falling from the nearby bridge, recounted in the documentary film The Loss of Nameless Things. In October 1980, after five seasons in Lexington, executive director Michael Van Landingham announced that the theatre would not return to Lexington House. In December 1980, the group began its first full season as Capital Repertory Theatre in Albany. The theatre company returned to Lexington House over subsequent years for new play development workshops and staged readings.

== Art Awareness ==
A not-for-profit founded in 1975, Art Awareness operated gallery and artist retreat space at Lexington house over 25 years, until the property was sold to Ensemble Studio Theatre. Run by artistic director Judd Weisberg and executive director Pamela Weisberg, Art Awareness hosted numerous artists and their works, including Elisa Monte, Alvin D. Loving, Ann Agee, Patsy Norvell, Mark Dion, Sarah Draney, Jared Handelsman and Gail Schneider.

== Ensemble Studio Theatre ==
In the early 1990s, Ensemble Studio Theater began using the 31-acre campus seasonally for its new play development work. In 2000, EST purchased the property for $190,000. The purchase strained the finances of the theatre group, unraveling in an embezzlement scandal and culminating in the suicide of founder Curt Dempster in 2007.

== Present use ==
Lexington House was acquired by Lexington Arts & Science, LLC in 2019.

In 2024, the town of Lexington applied for funding from the New York State Restore NY program, on behalf of a group of projects designed to revitalize the Lexington hamlet and restore and re-use several nearby historic structures. The proposal includes the restoration of Lexington House and the adjacent Barn Theatre, which previously housed Lexington Conservatory and Ensemble Studio Theatre.

Lexington House

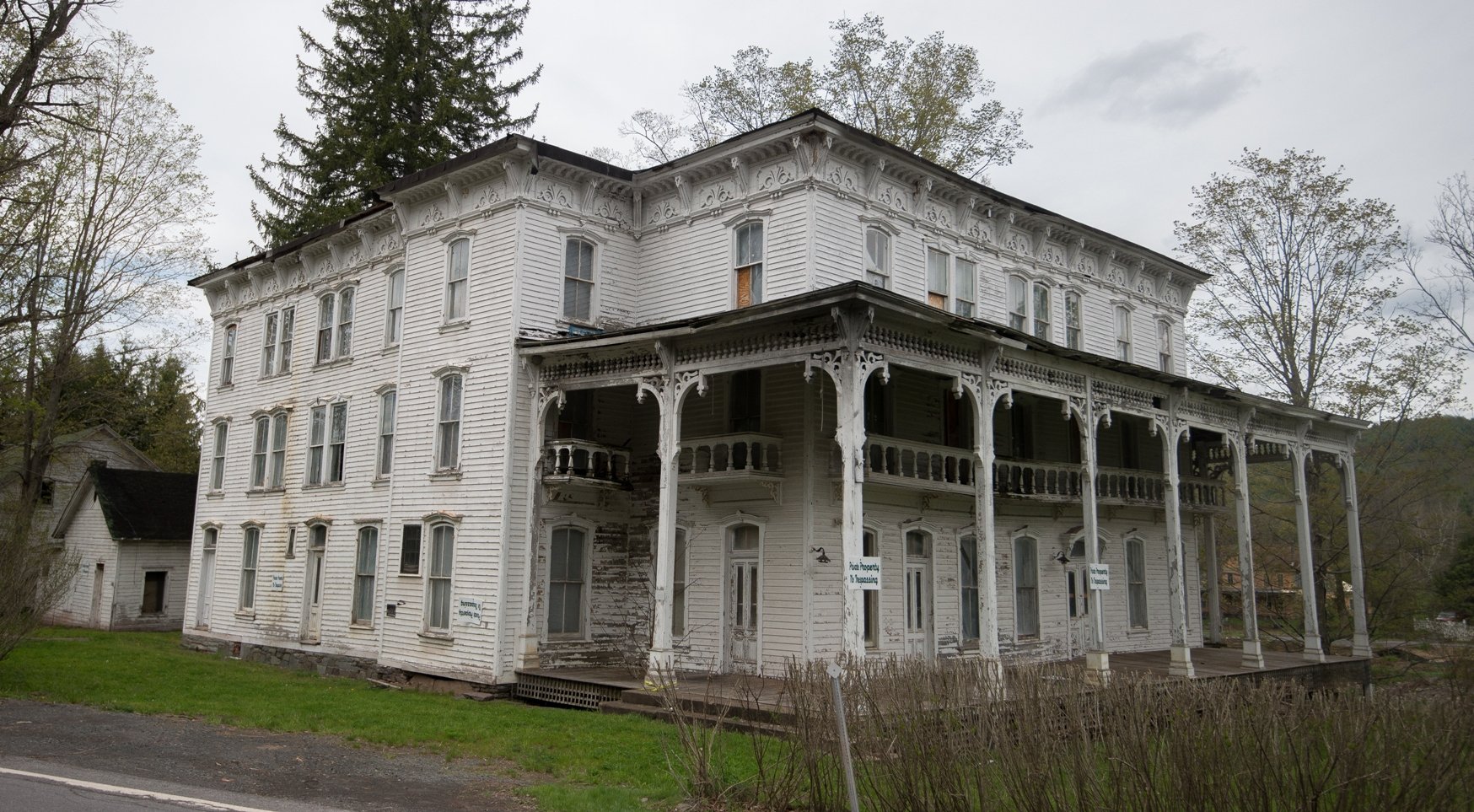
Lexington House
