= Court Miller =

American actor (1952–1986)

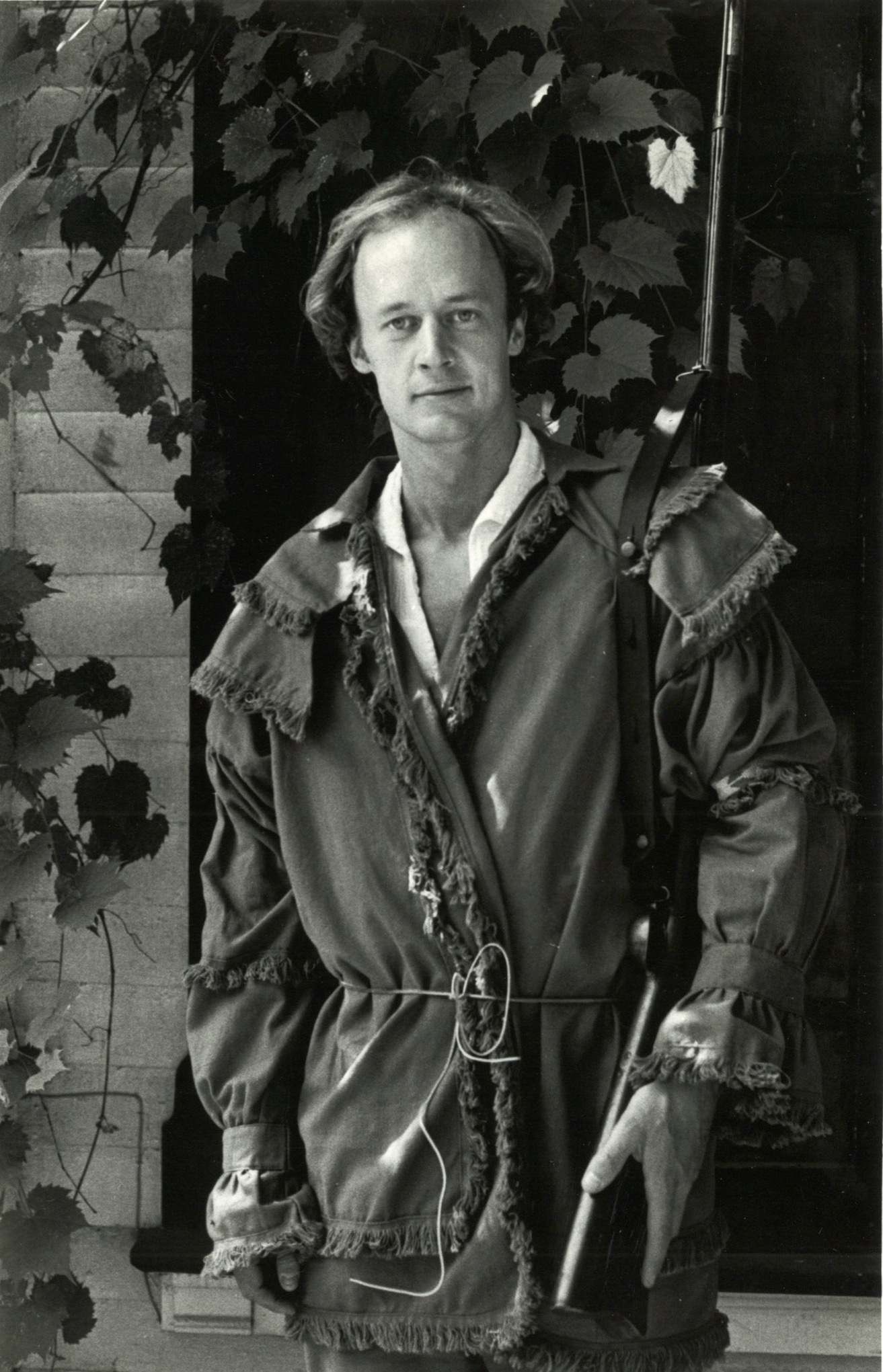
Miller in Grinder's Stand

Court Miller (1952–1986) was an American actor most notable for starring in the Broadway production of Torch Song Trilogy.

== Early life ==
Miller was born J. Courtlandt Miller on January 29, 1952 in New Canaan, Connecticut, one of three children.

== Career ==
Miller studied acting with Uta Hagen and singing with Louise Quinto. His early work included a 1974 starring role as King Arthur in Camelot at the Cortland Repertory Theater (alongside his wife Barbara Kolsun), and at the Rochester Opera House, Woodstock Playhouse and the Walker Art Center in Minneapolis. He had a starring role in the Susan Horowitz play Angelface in 1978 opposite Martha Schlamme and appeared in The Runner Stumbles at Studio Arena Theater in 1979. He also toured England and Scotland with the Paper Bag Players.

=== Lexington Conservatory Theatre ===
In 1977, Miller joined Lexington Conservatory Theatre as a company member with a role in the George M. Cohan play The Tavern. He continued his work with the company over four seasons, playing Mitch in A Streetcar Named Desire, the title role in Dr Faustus, Oberon and Theseus in A Midsummer Night's Dream and Clov in Endgame. He appeared in the 1978 world premiere of Monte Merrick's Nurseryland.

In 1979, Miller originated the role of Meriwether Lewis in the world premiere production of Oakley Hall III's Grinder's Stand. Critic Dan DiNicola wrote: "I cannot possibly do justice to the production and the performances, which often equal the brilliant moments within the play ... One cannot say enough about Miller, who succeeds in creating a disturbed man powerful in stature." The Albany Times Union wrote: "Court Miller, who is excellent in the role of Lewis, gives a terrifying display of a man withdrawing from drug use in a locked room," Miller had previously performed the role in a staged reading of the play in 1978.

In March 1980, the company launched Capital Repertory Theatre in Albany. Miller starred in its first full production, The Tavern, at the Egg. It was his last production with the company.

=== New York success ===
In 1980, Miller landed a role in the world premiere of Elizabeth and Essex, a musical at Encompass New Opera Theatre starring Estelle Parsons.

In 1981, he made his Broadway debut in the Robert Brush/Martin Charnin musical The First as a member of a cast that included David Huddleston, David Alan Grier and Lonette McKee. That same year, he played in José Quintero's revival of Welded by Eugene O'Neill with Philip Anglim and Ellen Tobie.

=== Torch Song Trilogy and beyond ===
In 1982, Miller was cast in his most prominent role, that of Ed in the Broadway premiere of Harvey Fierstein's Torch Song Trilogy. That fall, he made his first TV appearance in the television movie Rage of Angels, starring Jaclyn Smith.

A year later, he appeared at the 37th Tony Awards. Torch Song Trilogy received the award for Best Play, while Miller presented the award for Best Lighting Design.

Miller played opposite Anne Meara and Tom Noonan in a 1984 production of Harvey Fierstein's Spookhouse at Playhouse 91. Later that year, he reunited with several Lexington Conservatory alumni, including actress Kit Flanagan, director Barbara Rosoff and playwright Elizabeth Diggs, at Portland Stage Company, where he starred as Hank in Diggs' Goodbye Freddy. The play had previously been performed at Lexington in 1980. The Portland Stage production also included Barbara Eda-Young and Walter Bobbie.

Although Miller was primarily a stage actor, he also performed in movies and on television, including the feature films Garbo Talks, Cat's Eye, The New Kids and Playing for Keeps and the television series Ryan's Hope and Heart's Island.

== Death ==
Miller was married to actress and attorney Barbara Kolsun. According to friend Harvey Fierstein, Miller was diagnosed with HIV in 1982. He died of AIDS on March 7, 1986 in Portland, Maine. His name is memorialized on the NAMES Project AIDS Memorial Quilt in two panels.

Fierstein's 1987 trilogy Safe Sex is dedicated to Miller. One of the plays in the cycle, On Tidy Endings, is based on Miller's relationship with Kolsun. It was later produced by HBO as a film starring Fierstein and Stockard Channing and directed by Gavin Millar.
