= Sofia Landon Geier =

American actress

- Born: January 24, 1949 (age 76); Montreal, Quebec, Canada
- Occupation(s): writer, actress

Sofia Landon Geier (born January 24, 1949) is a television soap opera writer and actress. She is also credited as Sofia Landon or Sophia Landon.

Born in Canada, Geier grew up in Mt. Prospect, Illinois, the child of a commercial artist and a bank legal secretary. In her freshman year of high school, she auditioned for a role in the play Laura. Classmates included Barbara Rucker and Bruce Boxleitner, which whom she performed with numerous times. She studied theatre at Northwestern University.

After college, Geier appeared on television series such as The Rookies, Marcus Welby, M.D. and Medical Center before landing her major role on Guiding Light in 1978. Other early work include the film Murph the Surf directed by Marvin Chomsky as well as off-Broadway roles in The Red, White and Black, Heardbreak House, and Missouri Legend. Her performance in Peg O' My Heart garnered a Drama Desk nomination for best actress in 1977.

Geier was a founding company member of Lexington Conservatory Theatre in Lexington, New York, run by Artistic Director Oakley Hall III along with Executive Director Michael Van Landingham. Her numerous roles included Stella in A Streetcar Named Desire, Elizabeth in Frankenstein and Evelyn in the world premiere of Close Ties by Elizabeth Diggs. In 1979, she originated the role of Mrs. Grinder in Oakley Hall III's Grinder's Stand.

Geier continued to work with the company as it moved to Albany, New York and became Capital Repertory Theatre, appearing in its inaugural production of George M. Cohan's The Tavern in 1980, as well Peter Nichols' Joe Egg later that year.

She was married to Michael Van Landingham from 1977 to 1982.

== Acting jobs ==
Another World

- Jennifer Thatcher (1983)
- Donna Love (1990–1991; 1993)

Guiding Light

- Diane Ballard (1978–1981)

Tales from the Darkside 3rd Season

- May Dusa (1986) from the episode, "Miss May Dusa."

== Writing jobs ==
Another World

- Script Writer (1994-1999)

As the World Turns

- Script Writer (1991 - 1992)

Days of Our Lives

- Script Writer (1999 - January 26, 2007)

== Awards and nominations ==
Daytime Emmy Award

- Nomination, 1996, Best Writing, Another World

Writers Guild of America Award

- Nomination, 2001, Best Writing, Days of our Lives
- Win, 1999, Best Writing, Days of our Lives
- Nomination, 1994, 1995, 1997, Best Writing, Another World
