= Bridge Street Theatre =

Performance venue in New York, US

- Interactive map of Bridge Street Theatre
- Address: 44 West Bridge Street; Catskill, New York; United States
- Coordinates: 42°13′1″N 73°52′14″W
- Capacity: 84

Construction
- Opened: April 12, 2014

Bridge Street Theatre is an 84-seat production company and performance venue located in Catskill, New York. Incorporated in 2013, it is dedicated to producing new works, revisiting oft-neglected works from the theatrical canon, and approaching classic pieces from a new and different perspective.

== History ==
In 1986, founders John Sowle and Steven Patterson created a production company called Kaliyuga Arts for the purpose of presenting off-beat, challenging work. Of the 28 plays Kaliyuga Arts presented, eight were world premieres, three were U.S. premieres, six were regional premieres, and many others had not been seen in their respective regions for decades. As they migrated from Los Angeles to San Francisco to New York City and eventually to the Hudson Valley, Sowle and Patterson continued to present sporadically and tour occasionally, always in rented or donated spaces.

In November 2013, they purchased an old factory building on the outskirts of downtown Catskill, NY to serve as a permanent artistic home for their productions. The building opened to the public on April 12, 2014.

In 2019, the theatre will present its sixth season of in-house productions, along with an eclectic mix of theatre, dance, music and special events brought in from outside production sources.

Bridge Street Theatre has been instrumental in the region's cultural renaissance, thanks in part to ongoing support by New York State's Homes and Community Renewal Program.

== Productions of Note ==
- "A Conversation with Patty Duke" - June 8, 2014
- Revival of "Grinder's Stand" by Oakley Hall III - October 2015
- "Turning 15 on the Road to Freedom", directed by Ally Sheedy - February 2017
- World premiere of "The Official Adventures of Kieron and Jade" by Kieron Barry - April 2017
- World premiere multimedia dance piece by d. Sabela Grimes - June 2018
- World premiere of Michael Whistler's "Casse Noisette" - October 2018
- Revival of "The Shaggs Philosophy of the World", rarely-performed musical about the musical group "The Shaggs" - July 2019 (scheduled)
