= Capital Repertory Theatre =

Regional theatre in Albany, New York, US

Coordinates: 42°39′9.5″N 73°45′1.5″W

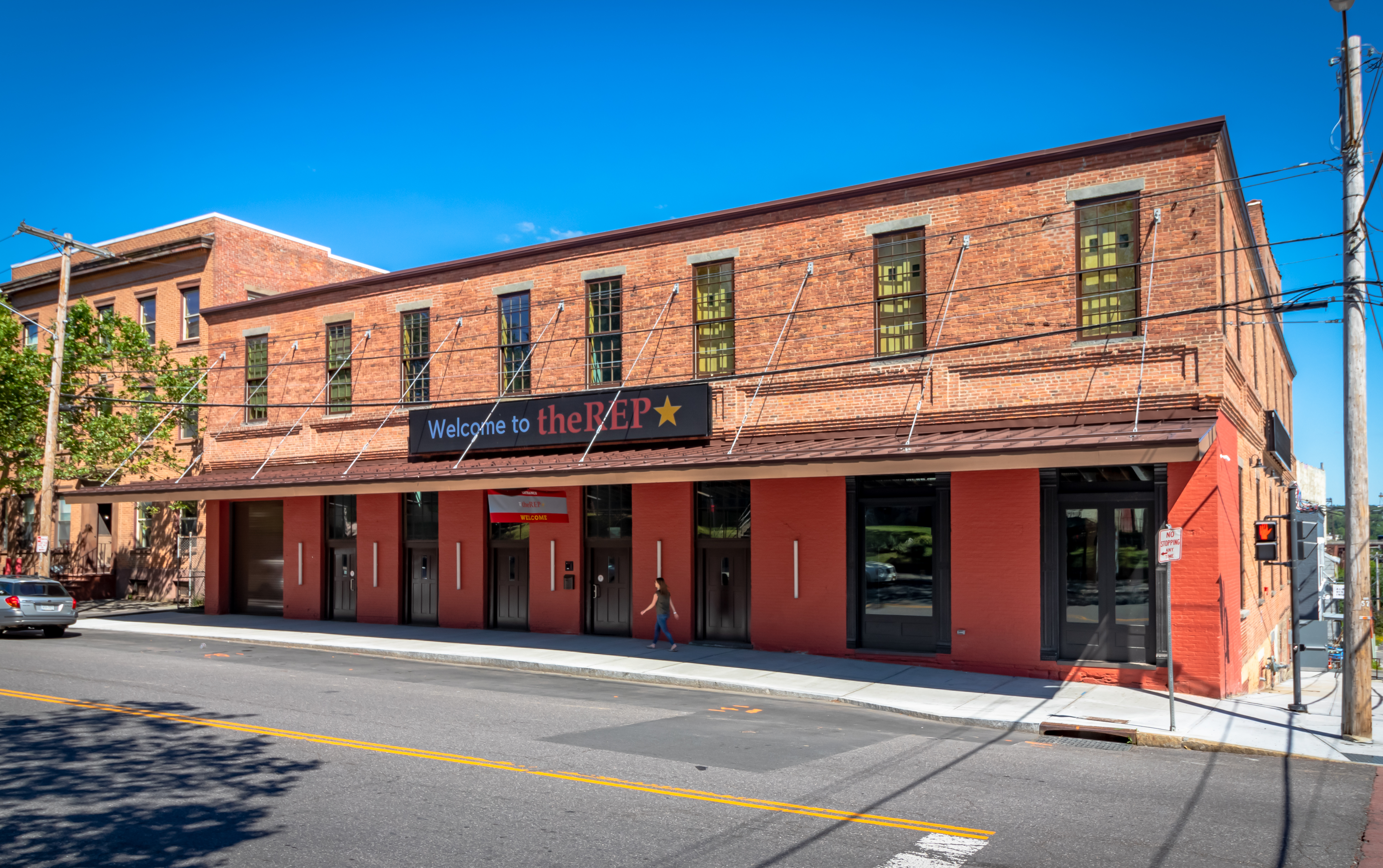
theREP

Capital Repertory Theatre (also called Capital Rep or simply theREP) is a 309-seat professional regional theatre in Albany, New York. Capital Rep is the only theatre in the Capital District that is a member of the League of Resident Theatres (LORT). As a member, it operates under collective bargaining agreements with Actors' Equity Association and other theatre worker unions.

The theatre relocated to its new home at 251 N. Pearl St in Albany, New York in 2021, and is one of three venues affiliated with Proctors Collaborative.

Artistic staff include Producing Artistic Director Maggie Mancinelli-Cahill, Associate Artistic Director Margaret E. Hall, along with associate artists Gordon Greenberg, Barbara Howard, Stephanie Klapper, Kevin McGuire, Jean-Remy Monnay, Yvonne Perry, Josh D. Smith and Freddy Ramirez.

== History ==
=== Lexington Conservatory Theatre ===
Lexington Conservatory Theatre, 1976

The theatre's predecessor was Lexington Conservatory Theatre in Lexington, New York, founded in 1976 by artistic director Oakley Hall III. In 1978, Hall suffered a traumatic brain injury, ending his career. That October, LCT staff began to explore developing a resident theatre in Albany.

On April 18, 1979, Lexington Conservatory executive director Michael Van Landingham and artistic director Abraham Tetenbaum held a press conference at the EBA Dance Studio in Albany, NY. They announced that the company would form a theatre in downtown Albany that followed a fall-winter-spring season, to be known as Capital Repertory Company or "Capital Rep." While they had reviewed various buildings in search of a suitable facility, they had decided that refurbishing a non-theatre building into a 450-seat theatre was the most viable option. "Basically, we decided to come to Albany for three reasons," said Van Landingham during the press conference. "We found 40 percent of our patrons last season came down to us from the Capital District; there's no professional theater in this city during the winter, and most importantly, we all really liked the place."

On April 19 and 20, the company presented a series of events called "The Break In", intended to orient the community to the theatre company and its work. It was the first event to carry the Capital Rep name. The event included music and video presentations, a discussion with director Lev Shekhtman, and selections of scenes from past productions.

=== Transition to Albany ===
On March 21, 1980, the company produced The Tavern by George M. Cohan at the Egg Theatre in Albany, the first full production under the Capital Rep name. Directed by future producing artistic director Peter Clough, it starred company members Michael J. Hume, Court Miller, Janni Brenn, Patricia Charbonneau, Sofia Landon Geier and Steve Hytner. "The premiere...was a completely auspicious one," according to critic James R. Gray, "charming enough to boost the new troupe into strong contention in its first "real" season next fall." "The idea is to make Albany the hub of our operations," Van Landingham told The Knickerbocker News prior to opening night. "We want to construct a network of productions, centered here." He described ambitious plans alongside the challenges of moving to Lexington to start Lexington Conservatory, in a remote location, and noted the success they found despite naysayers. "There's great satisfaction of doing something everyone says can't be done." In July, the company announced that it would take up residence at Page Hall for its new season, on the University of Albany campus. At the invitation of SUNY dean John W. Shumaker, the 93-person company would receive free performance space in exchange for providing learning opportunities for students and faculty for the college. The projected budget for the operation was $188,874.

An editorial in the Troy Times Record noted the trepidation of some, regarding the venture, as a professional company at Cohoes Music Hall had recently closed: "To survive, the Capital Repertory Company will need the support of everybody who believes that a major region of the United States needs a professional theater to augment the busy community theater already existing."

In October 1980, amidst circulating rumors, executive director Michael Van Landingham announced that the theatre would not return to Lexington House and instead move permanently to Albany. He cited a desire to be closer to the larger populace of Albany, which comprised much of the summer audience. The company did not want to abandon summer productions, and was also seeking a rural property to develop into a summer residence. No such project subsequently emerged, however. That December, the group began its first full season at Page Hall in Albany.

At the close of the 1981 season, the theatre faced mounting debts and an uncertain future. Executive director Michael Van Landingham resigned that June.

=== Market Theatre era ===
On August 31, 1981, Mayor Erastus Corning 2nd met with recently appointed Producing Artistic Directors Bruce Bouchard and Peter Clough, which secured the fledgling theatre with a new space in a former supermarket on North Pearl Street owned by the city of Albany.

At a press conference on November 12, Mayor Corning announced a rent-free, five-year lease of the former Grand Cash Market, which included the city paying for utilities and heat for at least the first year. Clough and Bouchard expressed optimism amidst the need to raise $225,000 for an operating budget, as well as to address an accumulated debt from previous years' deficit. A new board of directors was being organized, with support noted from local community leader Lewis A. Swyer, along with in-kind support from various groups including architecture firm Einhorn, Yaffe, Prescott and Krouner. The theatre planned to open for its new season in March 1982 with Table Manners by Alan Ayckbourn, and teased that the season might include a show directed by Albany native William Devane.

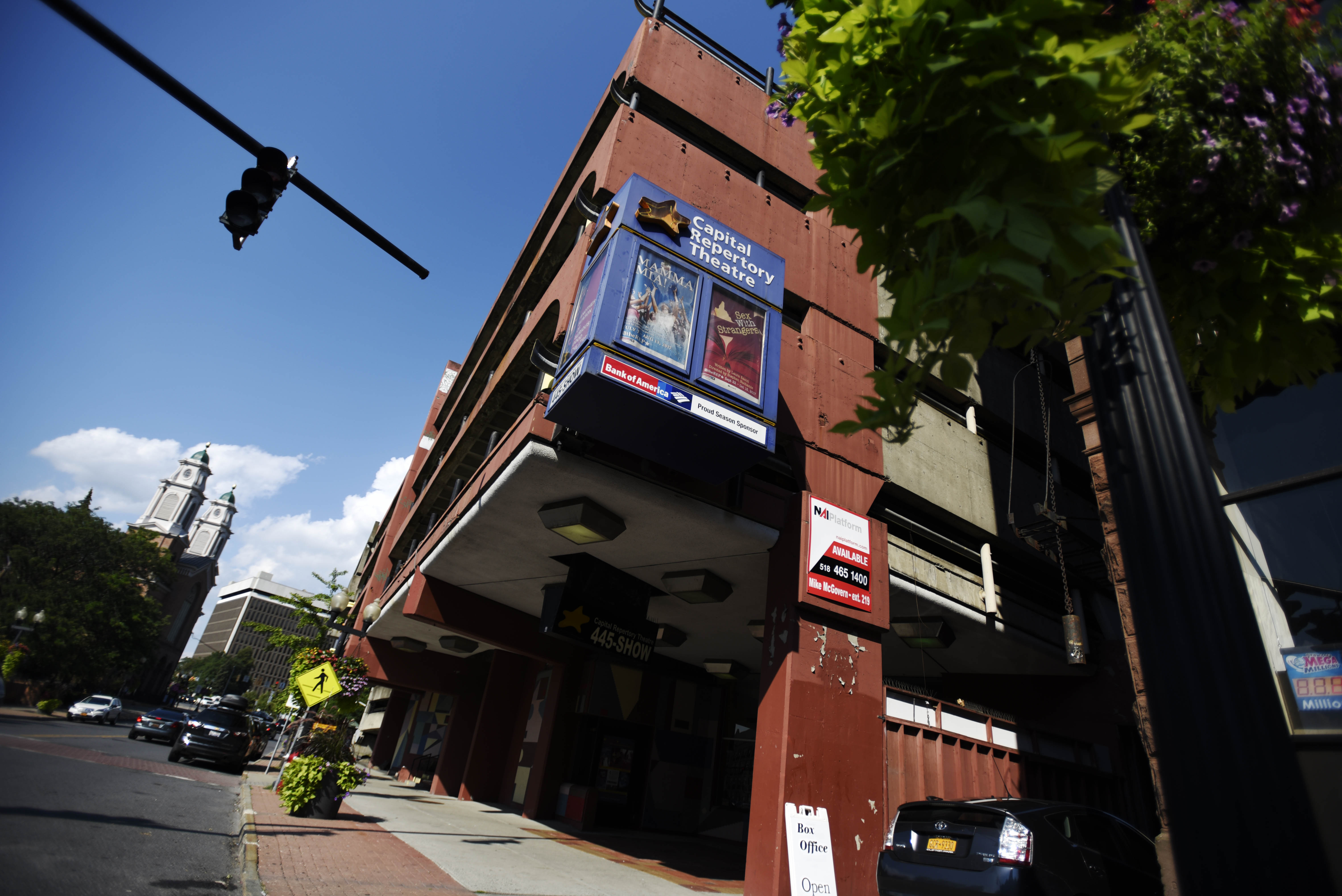
The Market Theatre, former facility at 111 North Pearl Street

After extensive construction, the Market Theatre opened on March 5, 1982 and was the theatre's home for the next 39 years.

In 1995, the Board of Trustees appointed Maggie Mancinelli-Cahill as the producing artistic director. Under her aegis, the theatre developed an affiliation with arts organization Proctors Collaborative and expanded its regional focus. In January 2025, she announced that the current season would be her last. That February, the theatre announced that Miriam Weisfeld, artistic director of Adirondack Theatre Festival, would assume the title of producing artistic director for Capital Repertory Theatre, beginning in September and overseeing the 2025-26 season. The announcement reflected a deepening relationship with the theatre festival.

=== Permanent facility ===
In 2021, the theatre moved to 251 North Pearl Street.

The theatre's leadership positions are primarily held by women; its productions also notably provide opportunities for women theatre technicians in crafts and disciplines traditionally dominated by men.

== Notable Productions ==
The theatre has produced numerous world premieres, including Dreaming Emmett by Toni Morrison, November by Don Nigro, Saint Florence by Elizabeth Diggs, Breaking Up Is Hard to Do by Neil Sedaka, Grand View by William Kennedy and Edges: A Song Cycle by Pasek and Paul.

== Mission ==
According to the website, the mission of Capital Rep is "to create a meaningful theatre generated from an authentic link to the community."

== Awards ==
- Theatre Communications Group Playwright in Residence Award (1997)
- American Marketing Association Mark of Excellence Award (1996)
- Pew Charitable Trust National Theatre Artist Residency Program Award (1993)
- Kennedy Center Fund for New American Play Award (1988 & 1992)
- Foundation of the Dramatists Guild/CBS Awards (1984, 1986 & 1987)
- Business Committee for the Arts First Place National Award (1984)
- Outstanding New Enterprise - Albany/Colonie Regional Chamber of Commerce (1983)

== See also ==
- Lexington Conservatory Theatre
- League of Resident Theatres
- Regional Theatre
- Capital District
