= Oakley Hall III =

American dramatist

Oakley "Tad" Hall III (May 26, 1950 – February 13, 2011) was an American playwright, director, and author. The co-founder and first artistic director of Lexington Conservatory Theatre, in 1978 he suffered a traumatic brain injury in a fall from a bridge; he spent decades in recovery and in the process of creating a new life. He is the subject of the 2004 documentary The Loss of Nameless Things.

== Early life and education ==
Oakley Hall III was the eldest child of novelist Oakley Hall and photographer Barbara E. Hall, and the brother of Sands Hall. In 1963, following a long family trip to Europe, his parents enrolled him at Phillips Academy in Andover, Massachusetts, where he first became involved in theatre. The winter of his junior year, he dove head-first out a third-story dorm room into what he thought was a snowbank, but was actually a stone bench concealed under a mound of snow. Hall suffered a gash to his head and a split lip. The following weekend, he left school grounds without permission to visit his then-girlfriend, Dana Porter, at Foxcroft, a girls boarding school in Middleburg, Virginia. These two incidents resulted in Hall's expulsion from Phillips Academy.

Hall returned to Los Angeles to live with his father and completed his high school studies at Hollywood High before enrolling in the newly formed University of California, Irvine where Hall's father was working as a Writer in Residence.

At Irvine, Hall met future collaborators Bruce Bouchard and Michael Van Landingham. He acted in numerous productions as part of the prestigious Irvine Repertory Theater, including a minor role in Clayton Garrison's production of Marat/Sade by Peter Weiss, alongside lead actors Bob Gunton and Robert Cohen as well as Dark of the Moon by Howard Richardson and William Berney. In fall of 1968, Hall, Bouchard, and Steven Nisbet (another future Lexington collaborator) received summer scholarships to study at San Francisco's American Conservatory Theater, founded by Bill Ball, its then artistic director.

In 1969, at age 18, Hall made national news in refusing the draft, mailing back his draft card and citing US war crimes in Vietnam for his reason in doing so.

That summer, he "starred" in a short 8mm home movie ‘’Dionysus and the Maenads’’, conceived and filmed by writer, bookshop owner and family friend Blair Fuller. In the film, Hall is cast as the Greek god Dionysus, who is chased by a growing crowd of furies, sylphs, goddesses and nymphs, played by friends and neighbors of Hall's parents. Seeking to escape his pursuers, a naked Hall eventually slides barefoot down a steep slope covered with snow and ice, presumably crashing onto the rocks below where he "dies", is mourned but is then "reborn", exuberantly leaping up from a small pool of water.

In 1974, he completed an MFA in writing from Boston University, studying under John Cheever and Ivan Gold. Hall had finished a novel titled The Archons and submitted it as his thesis. Cheever told him the work was "perfect", urged him to seek a New York publisher and assured him, "They'll publish it right away..." But Cheever was in the throes of extreme alcoholism at the time and was known to avoid reading anything by his students outside of classes, leaving his assessment of Hall's novel suspect. Hall never found an interested publisher and the work languished, remaining unpublished to this day.

It was at Boston University that Hall met fellow student Mary Gormley, daughter of prominent Massachusetts doctor Charles Gormley. They married at Cape Cod in the spring of 1975 and moved to a Manhattan apartment on 78th St and 1st Ave where Mary took a job with the magazine Psychology Today. Oakley worked as a guard at the West Side Center for Mental Health in Harlem. They would eventually have two children together: Oakley IV and Elizabeth.

== Career ==
In 1976, Hall co-founded Lexington Conservatory Theatre, located in the Catskills town of Lexington, NY.

In 1977, his play Mike Fink was read at the New York Shakespeare Festival for producer Joseph Papp. It starred Mandy Patinkin, William Hurt and Glenn Close among others, and was directed by future Capital Repertory Theatre producing artistic director Peter Clough.

That same year, Hall received a grant from the National Endowment for the Arts.

Hall made a lifelong study of the pre-surrealist playwright Alfred Jarry, and translated several of Jarry's plays from the original French. In 1976–1977 he translated and adapted Jarry's bizarrely comic and revolutionary 1896 French play Ubu Roi (which Jarry titled Ubu Rex) and its sequels, and directed them in New York City Off-Off-Broadway and also at the Lexington Conservatory Theatre. The adaptations starred Richard Zobel, who also produced the play and created the masks for it.

Hall's 1978 play Beatrice (Cenci) and the Old Man, with its challenging, dark humor and incestual subtext, received mostly positive reviews but has not been produced again. "...perversely and engagingly humorous," according to critic Dan DiNicola. "[It] deserves serious and intelligent consideration as a work of both potential and merit."

In 1979, Lexington Conservatory premiered his play Grinder's Stand, a historical drama written in blank verse exploring the mysterious death of Meriwether Lewis. Directed by Peter Clough, the show starred Court Miller, Michael J. Hume, Richard Zobel, Sofia Landon Geier, Richard E. Council, Red Sutton and Bruce Bouchard. "If you care, really care, about theater you will get to Lexington to see Grinder's Stand between now and Sunday," said critic Dan DiNicola. "More than any other new play I have seen, it has the potential to become a richly significant piece of American drama."

The publication of Otis Bigelow's play The Prevalence of Mrs. Seal is dedicated to Hall.

== Accident ==
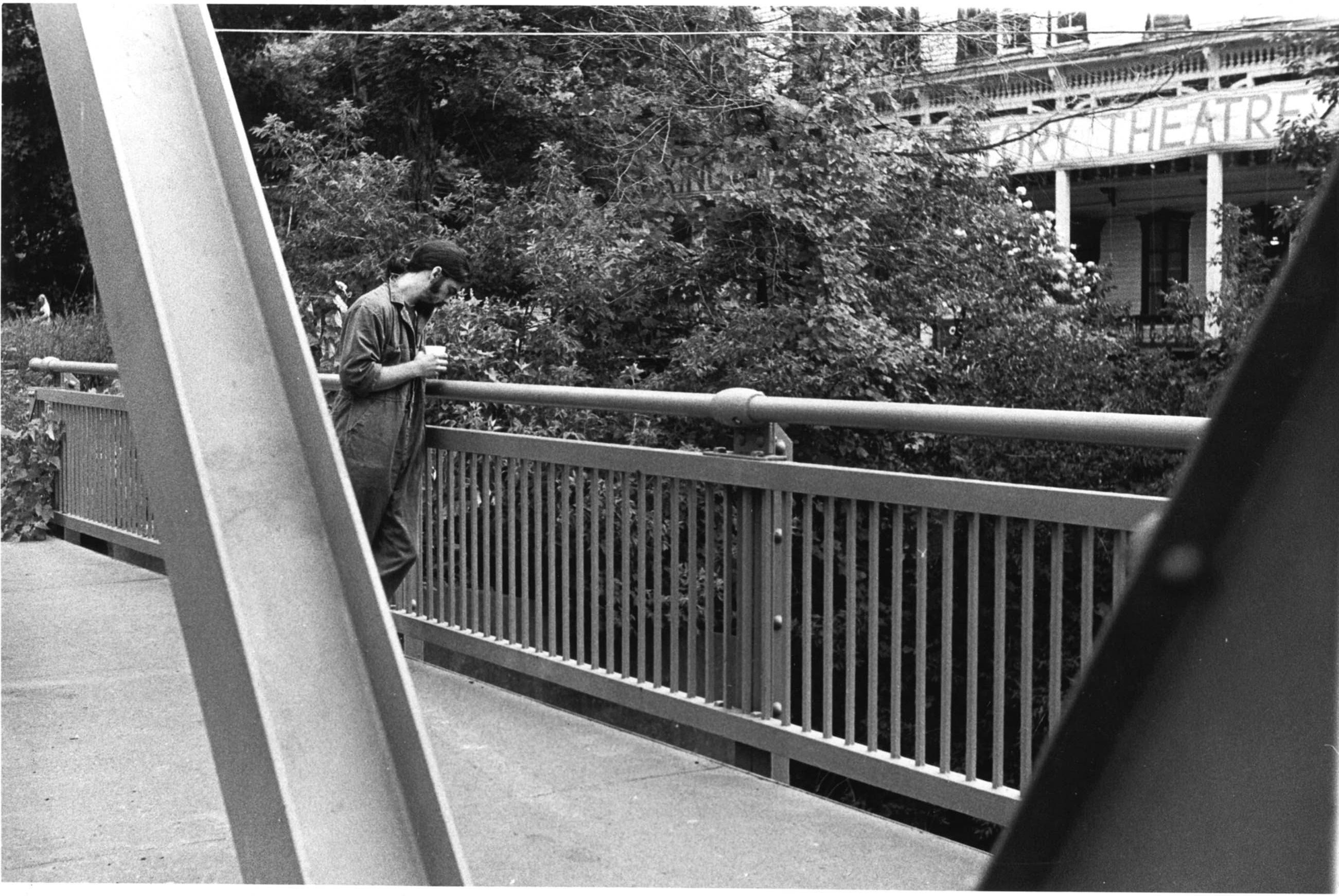
Playwright Oakley Hall III on the Rt 42 Bridge in Lexington, NY

On July 17, 1978, Hall suffered a traumatic brain injury in a fall from a bridge. He was rushed to Stamford Hospital and later to Albany Medical Center where he began a difficult recovery. In 1979, he told the Albany Times Union that he had just completed writing the final monologue of his play Grinder's Stand. He could not remember what happened that night. "I still don't remember if I jumped or fell," he said, on the eve of the LCT production of Grinder's Stand. "I also can't remember who at the National Endowment I'm supposed to send a copy of this play as part of the grant requirement...I'm a full time playwright, but it looks like this fall I'll have to find some kind of job. I'm completely out of money. I don't know where I'll go and I don't know what I'll do."

The written version of this monologue was lost, but had been read into an audio tape. The recording facilitated its recovery, except for one unintelligible line.

== Later life ==
In 1990, Hall submitted his play A Dying Art for consideration at the Reality Theatre Company's new play festival in Columbus, Ohio. It was selected for a staged reading that year. After revisions working with producing director Frank A. Barnhart and Artistic Director Dee Shepherd, it received a full production at the theatre in 1991, where it was noted as a highlight of the festival by The Columbus Dispatch. Richard Ades of The Other Paper described it as "a clever and gleefully perverse black comedy," noting that "it's well-served by Dee Shepherd's intense direction, and set designer Chris Jones's crumbling wall backdrop is more than adequate for a play too self-consciously theatrical to be mistaken for real life."

Hall continued to write, though he gave up acting as a result of diminished memory for remembering lines. He completed an unpublished novel about Lilith, a biblical character and Adam's first wife.

=== Documentary and rediscovery ===
In 2002, Foothill Theatre Company in Nevada City, California received a $6,000 grant from the National Endowment for the Arts to support the development of Hall's 1979 play Grinder's Stand. Director Bill Rose, a friend of Hall's brother in law, heard about the production and began documenting it, a project which grew into the award-winning documentary The Loss of Nameless Things. The film was exhibited theatrically throughout the country in 2004. Two years later, it aired on PBS as an episode of Independent Lens.

=== Return to Albany ===
In 2008, he moved to Albany, New York to live with Hadiya Wilborn, who fostered a collaboration with acclaimed puppeteer Ed Atkeson. This resulted in a production of Jarry's Ubu Rex in 2010, performed by the Firlefanz Puppets at Steamer No. 10 Theatre in Albany, New York, directed by Oakley, with actor Steven Patterson in the title role. In the fall of 2010, Moving Finger Press published Oakley's novel, Jarry and Me, in which Oakley intertwines a memoir of his own life with a sly "autobiography" of Jarry. One of the last sentences of the book is, "Jarry dies with a grin on his face." That summer, he returned to the Community of Writers conference, co-founded by his father, as an author presenting his new work.

=== Death ===
On February 13, 2011, Hall died of a heart attack at his Albany home. He was survived by his two children. Poet Molly Fisk dedicated her poem "A Theatrical Death" to him.

== Legacy ==
Lexington Conservatory Theatre, co-founded by Hall, operated for five years at historic Lexington House in the Catskill mountains. Many of its alumni went on to notable careers on stage and screen. In 1980, the company moved to Albany, NY and became Capital Repertory Theatre. It continues to produce professional theatre, including new plays and world premieres.

The 2004 documentary led to increased interest in Hall and his work, including revivals of some of his plays in Kansas, Ohio, Connecticut, North Dakota and upstate New York.

In 2009, writer and director Fred Dekker said in an interview that he had been approached to write and direct a feature film about Hall, based upon the documentary by Bill Rose. "I think the script is the best thing I have ever done," Dekker said. In 2013, producer Curtis Burch announced he was developing the feature film and hoped the film would go into production in 2014.

In 2015, Catskill's Bridge Street Theatre revived Grinder's Stand. It starred William Dobbins, along with Steven Patterson. Patterson had previously been a member of Lexington Conservatory Theatre in 1977, where he appeared in Hall's Ubu Rex and Hall's version of Tis Pity She's a Whore; in 2010 Patterson also starred in Hall's Albany revival of Ubu Rex.

== Plays ==
Produced Plays

- Ubu Rex (translated and adapted from the play Ubu Roi by Alfred Jarry)
- Doorman
- Mike Fink
- Frankenstein (based on the novel by Mary Shelley)
- Ubu Enchained (translated and adapted from the play by Alfred Jarry)
- A Dying Art
- Grinder's Stand
- Beatrice (Cenci) and the Old Man (based on the 1935 play by Antonin Artaud)

Unproduced Plays

- Melmoth the Wanderer (based on the 1820 novel by Charles Maturin)
- The Monks of Monk Hall (based on the 1845 novel by George Lippard)
- The Moonstone (based on the 1871 novel by Wilkie Collins)
- The Occultation and Lumification of Mr. Ubu

== Productions and notable readings ==
- 1976 Frankenstein at Lexington Conservatory Theatre
- 1976 Ubu Rex at Hansen Galleries, New York City. Directed by Oakley Hall III
- 1977 Ubu Rex at Lexington Conservatory Theatre, a PROVOS series production
- 1977 Doorman, Cash and Mental Health at Lexington Conservatory Theatre, a PROVOS series reading.
- 1977 Mike Fink, a staged reading at New York Shakespeare Festival starring Mandy Patinkin, Dwight Shultz, Dominic Chianese, John Glover, Lenny Baker, Glenn Close, William Hurt, Clifton James. Directed by Peter Clough.
- 1977 Frankenstein staged reading at Fairfield University, October 31, 1977
- 1977 Doorman at New York Stageworks, a full production. Directed by Bill Partlan, starring Brent Jennings December 12, 15, 21 and 22.
- 1978 Beatrice (Cenci) and the Old Man at Lexington Conservatory Theatre. Directed by Wendy Chapin
- 1978 Grinder's Stand staged reading produced by Phoenix Theatre, starring John Seitz, Tom Klunis, Kenneth Welsh and Mimi Kennedy. Directed by Bill Partlan. At Marymount Manhattan Theatre.
- 1978 Ubu Enchained at Lexington Conservatory Theatre, a PROVOS series reading
- 1979 Grinder's Stand at Lexington Conservatory Theatre, a full production starring Court Miller and Sofia Landon Directed by Peter Clough
- 1982 Frankenstein at Capital Repertory Theatre. Directed by Peter Clough, with additional material by Kathleen Masterson
- 1991 Beatrice (Cenci) and the Old Man, a staged reading at Reality Theatre, Columbus Ohio.
- 1991 A Dying Art at Reality Theatre, Columbus Ohio. A full production starring Richard Boorman, Elaine Miracle and Michael Day. Directed by Dee Shepherd
- 2002 Grinder's Stand at Foothill Theatre Company.
- 2009 Grinder's Stand at Kaw Point Park, site of a Lewis and Clark encampment
- 2010 Ubu Rex in collaboration with Firlefanz Puppets at Steamer 10 Theatre in Albany, NY
- 2012 Frankenstein at Chase Collegiate School, directed by Bob Cutrofello.
- 2013 Frankenstein at Cleveland Ensemble Theatre, Directed by Ian Wolfgang Hinz
- 2015 Grinder's Stand at Bridge Street Theatre. Directed by John Sowle
- 2018 Grinder's Stand at TruNorth Theatre in Bismarck, ND. Directed by John Clemo.

== Novels ==
- The Archons 1974 (unpublished)
- Jarry and Me 2010

== Cultural references ==
Hall has been mentioned in music, including The Tigersharks' "The Ballad of Oakley Hall III"

== Bibliography ==
- Hall III, Oakley (2010). Jarry and Me. Absintheur Press. Archived from the original on 2014-09-15.
- Hall, Sands (2018). Flunk. Start. Counterpoint Press. ISBN 9781619021785.
- Bailey, Blake (2009). Cheever: A Life. Knopf. ISBN 9781400043941.
