= Oakley Hall =

American writer (1920–2008)

- Born: July 1, 1920; San Diego, California, U.S.
- Died: May 12, 2008 (aged 87); Nevada City, California, U.S.
- Occupation: Novelist
- Children: Oakley "Tad" Hall III, Sands Hall
- Writing career
- Genre: Western
- Notable work: Warlock
- Notable awards: Lifetime achievement awards from PEN American Center and the Cowboy Hall of Fame

Oakley Maxwell Hall (July 1, 1920 – May 12, 2008) was an American novelist. He was born in San Diego, California, graduated from the University of California, Berkeley, and served in the Marines during World War II. Some of his mysteries were published under the pen names "O.M. Hall" and "Jason Manor." Hall received his Master of Fine Arts in English from the Iowa Writers' Workshop at the University of Iowa.

== Career ==
His books focus primarily on the historical American West. His most famous book, Warlock, was a finalist for the Pulitzer Prize for Fiction in 1958. The film adaptation of the same title, directed by Edward Dmytryk, starred Henry Fonda, Richard Widmark and Anthony Quinn. In Thomas Pynchon's introduction to Richard Fariña's Been Down So Long It Looks Like Up to Me, Pynchon stated that he and Fariña started a "micro-cult" around Warlock. Another novel, The Downhill Racers, was made into a film starring Robert Redford in 1969.

After the death of Wallace Stegner, Hall was considered the dean of West Coast writers, having supported the early careers of novelists such as Richard Ford and Michael Chabon, both graduates of the well-known writing program at the University of California, Irvine, where Hall taught for many years, and Amy Tan, his student from The Community of Writers at Squaw Valley. Hall's colleagues at Irvine included Pulitzer Prize-winning poet and fellow Iowa graduate Charles Wright, and poet and Victorian Scholar Robert Peters. San Diego—and Hall's one-time San Diego neighborhood of Mission Hills—serve as focal points of two novels, Corpus of Joe Bailey and Love & War in California.

Oakley Hall married Barbara Edinger Hall, a professional photographer, in 1944, and they were married for 64 years. They had four children: Brett Hall Jones, director of the Community of Writers at Squaw Valley, the writers’ conference that Oakley Hall helped found in 1969; Sands Hall, a teacher, actor, director, and novelist (Catching Heaven, 2000, and Tools of the Writer’s Craft, 2005); Tracy, a schoolteacher; and Oakley "Tad" Hall III, the author of the play Grinder’s Stand, whose tragic fall from a bridge and the brain damage suffered from this fall are documented in Bill Rose's film The Loss of Nameless Things.

Hall died May 12, 2008, in Nevada City, California. Among his many honors are lifetime achievement awards from the PEN American Center and the Cowboy Hall of Fame.

== Bibliography ==
=== Western ===
- Warlock (Legends West, 1958)
- The Adelita (1975)
- The Bad Lands (Legends West, 1978)
- The Children of the Sun (1983)
- The Coming of the Kid (1985)
- Apaches (Legends West, 1986)

=== Ambrose Bierce series ===
- Ambrose Bierce and the Queen of Spades (1998)
- Ambrose Bierce and the Death of Kings (2001)
- Ambrose Bierce and the One-Eyed Jacks (2003)
- Ambrose Bierce and the Trey of Pearls (2004)
- Ambrose Bierce and the Ace of Shoots (2005)

=== Other novels ===
- Murder City (as O.M. Hall, 1949)
- So Many Doors (1950)
- Corpus of Joe Bailey (1953)
- Too Dead to Run as Jason Manor (1953)
- The Red Jaguar as Jason Manor (1954)
- The Pawns of Fear as Jason Manor (1955)
- Mardios Beach (1955)
- The Tramplers as Jason Manor (1956)
- The Downhill Racers (1963)
- The Pleasure Garden (1966)
- A Game for Eagles (1970)
- Report from Beau Harbor (1971)
- Lullaby (1982)
- Separations (1997)
- Love and War in California (2007)

=== Non-fiction ===
- The Art and Craft of Novel Writing (1995)
- How Fiction Works (2000)

== See also ==
- Ambrose Bierce (character)
