= List of Jews born in the Russian Empire and the Soviet Union =

This List of Jews contains individuals who, in accordance with Wikipedia's verifiability and no original research policies, have been identified as Jews by reliable sources.

The following is a list of Jews born in the territory of the former Russian Empire. It is geographically defined, so it also includes people born after the dissolution of the Russian Empire in 1922 and its successor the Soviet Union in 1991.

A few years before the Holocaust, the Jewish population of the Soviet Union (excluding Western Ukraine and the Baltic states that were not part of the Soviet Union then) stood at over 5 million, most of whom were Ashkenazic as opposed to Sephardic, with some Karaite minorities. It is estimated that more than half died directly as a result of the Holocaust.

== Politics and military ==
=== Politicians ===
- Georgy Arbatov, Soviet politician, academic and political advisor
- Aizik Aronchik, attempted to assassinate the Tsar Alexander II
- Dimitri Bogrov, Soviet politician
- Anatoly Chubais, Deputy Prime Minister, now Chairman of UES
- Mikhail Fradkov, Russian Prime Minister (half-Jewish)
- Volodymyr Groysman, Prime Minister of Ukraine (2016–2019)
- Adolph Joffe, Bolshevik diplomat
- Lazar Kaganovich, First Deputy Premier of the Soviet Union and one of the principal architects of the Ukrainian famine.
- Lev Kamenev, Bolshevik leader (Jewish father)
- Maxim Litvinov, Soviet ambassador and Minister of Foreign Affairs
- Julius Martov, Menshevik leader
- Mikhail Mishustin, incumbent Prime Minister
- Boris Nemtsov, Deputy Prime Minister
- Yevgeny Prigozhin, head of the Wagner Group private military company. Led a rebellion against Russian President Vladimir Putin (Jewish father)
- Yevgeny Primakov, Russian politician and diplomat who served as Prime Minister of Russia from 1998 to 1999.
- Karl Radek, Soviet politician
- Yevgeny Roizman, deputy of the Russian State Duma, mayor of Yekaterinburg (Jewish father)
- Grigory Sokolnikov, Bolshevik politician
- Vladimir Solovyov, Russian TV presenter and propagandist
- Yakov Sverdlov, Bolshevik leader, the first head of state of the Russian SFSR
- Leon Trotsky, Bolshevik politician, the founder of the Red Army
- Moisei Uritsky, Soviet politician
- Leonid Volkov, Russian opposition leader. Alexei Navalny's campaign manager
- Genrikh Yagoda, head of Secret Police in the Stalin era (1934–1936)
- Yakov Yurovsky, Bolshevik commander, was in charge of imprisonment and execution of Tsar Nicolas II of Russia and his family (under Vladimir Lenin's orders)
- Volodymyr Zelenskyy, President of Ukraine
- Grigory Zinoviev, Soviet politician
- Vladimir Zhirinovsky, Russian politician; leader of the Liberal Democratic Party of Russia (LDPR); Vice-chairman of the State Duma; member of the Parliamentary Assembly of the Council of Europe"

=== Israeli politicians ===
- Menachem Begin, Israeli Prime Minister, Nobel Prize (1978)
- Yitzhak Ben-Zvi, second President of Israel (1952–63)
- Shmuel Dayan, Zionist activist, Israeli politician
- Levi Eshkol, Israeli Prime Minister (1963–69)
- Ephraim Katzir, fourth President of Israel (1973–78)
- Avigdor Lieberman, Israeli Deputy Prime Minister and Minister of Strategic Affairs (2006–2008)
- Golda Meir, Israeli Prime Minister (1969–74)
- Yitzhak Shamir, Israeli Prime Minister (1983–84, 1986–92)
- Natan Sharansky, Israeli politician
- Moshe Sharett, Israeli Prime Minister (1954–55)
- Zalman Shazar, third President of Israel (1963–73)
- Chaim Weizmann, first President of Israel (1949–52)

=== Israeli military persons ===
- Yaakov Dori, first Chief of Staff of the Israel Defense Forces (IDF) (1948–1949); President of Technion.
- Ze'ev Jabotinsky, founder of British Jewish Legion
- Haim Laskov, fifth Chief of Staff of the Israel Defense Forces (1958–1961)
- Yitzhak Sadeh, Palmach commander and one of the IDF founders
- Joseph Trumpeldor, founder of British Jewish Legion and early pioneer-settler in Israel (born in Pyatigorsk)
- Tzvi Tzur, sixth Chief of Staff of the Israel Defense Forces (1961–1964)

=== Soviet soldiers and revolutionaries ===
- Osip Aptekman, revolutionary
- Pavel Axelrod, Menshevik, Marxist revolutionary
- Yevno Azef, revolutionary
- Tuvia Bielski, Belarusian partisan
- Yakov Blumkin, Soviet spy
- Ivan Chernyakhovsky, Soviet Front Commander, WWII
- Fedor Dan, revolutionary
- Leo Deutsch, revolutionary
- David Dragunsky, Soviet tank brigade commander, WWII
- Raya Dunayevskaya, founder of Marxist humanism in the U.S.
- Hesya Helfman, revolutionary
- Grigory Gershuni, revolutionary
- Moshe Gildenman, known as Dyadya ("Uncle") Misha, partisan commander
- Mordechai Schlein, partisan and violinist.Tzvi (2020-08-17). "12-Year-Old Jewish Hero of WWII | Aish". Aish.com.
- Grigory Goldenberg, revolutionary
- Olga Kameneva, Russian Bolshevik revolutionary and a Soviet politician (sister of Leon Trotsky)
- Walter Krivitsky, Soviet spy
- Semyon Krivoshein, Soviet mechanized corps commander, WWII
- Rodion Malinovsky, Soviet front commander, WWII, Minister of Defence (Jewish origin is disputed)
- Mark Natanson, revolutionary
- Alexander Parvus, revolutionary
- Grigoriy Plaskov, Soviet artillery lieutenant
- Sidney Reilly (born Shlomo Rosenblum), Ukrainian-born adventurer and Secret Intelligence Service agent
- Theodore Rothstein, Russian-British communist
- Pinhas Rutenberg, Zionist, Social revolutionary
- Israel and Manya Shochat, founders of the Hashomer movement
- Moisei Uritsky, communist revolutionary
- Volin (Vsevolod Eikhenbaum), leading Russian Anarchist. Senior member of Nestor Makhno's movement (1918–1921)
- V. Volodarsky, communist revolutionary
- Iona Yakir, Red Army commander and one of the world's major military reformers between World War I and World War II

=== Others ===
- Murray Bookchin, important American anarchist
- Michael Dorfman, Russian-Israeli essayist and human rights activist
- David Dubinsky, American labor leader
- Yisroel ben Eliezer (The Baal Shem Tov), rabbi, founder of Hasidic Judaism
- Shlomo Ganzfried, rabbi
- Fanny Kaplan, would-be assassin of Lenin
- Nathan Mileikowsky, Zionist political activist, rabbi and writer
- Menachem Mendel Schneerson, Rebbe of the Chabad-Lubavitch branch of Hasidic Judaism
- Boris Volynov, Soviet astronaut; the first Jew in space (Jewish mother)

== Business figures ==
- Roman Abramovich, businessman, former owner of Chelsea F.C.
- Pyotr Aven, businessman
- Leon Bagrit, pioneer of automation
- Bernhard Baron, cigarette maker and philanthropist
- Boris Berezovsky, businessman, politician
- Zino Davidoff (born Sussele-Meier Davidoff), former tobacco manufacturer, known as "King of Cigars"
- Bernard Delfont, impresario
- Mikhail Fridman, businessman
- Arcadi Gaydamak, owner of Portsmouth F.C., AJ Auxerre, and Bnei Sakhnin F.C.
- Leslie Grade, executive
- Lew Grade, impresario, Chairman of ATV from 1962
- Vladimir Gusinsky, exile, former media tycoon
- Boris Khait, businessman and vice-president of the Russian Jewish Congress
- German Khan, businessman
- Mikhail Khodorkovsky, businessman, politician (Jewish father)
- Ihor Kolomoyskyi, Ukrainian businessman
- Max Levchin (born Maksymilian Levchin), co-founder of PayPal
- Morris Markin, founder of Checker Cab
- Michael Marks, co-founder of Marks & Spencer
- Alexander Mashkevitch, businessman
- Louis B. Mayer, co-founder of Metro-Goldwyn-Mayer (MGM)
- Leonid Mikhelson, businessman, CEO, chairman and major shareholder of the Russian gas company Novatek
- Yuri Milner, entrepreneur, venture capitalist
- Boris Mints, co-founder of Otkritie FC Bank
- Vadim Moshkovich, businessman, founder of Rusagro
- Leonid Nevzlin, businessman
- Mikhail Prokhorov, businessman
- Ida Rosenthal, founder of Maidenform Brassieres
- Arkady Rotenberg, businessman, Vladimir Putin's childhoods friend
- Boris Rotenberg, businessman, Vladimir Putin's childhood friend
- David Sarnoff (born Schwirnofsky), former head of RCA
- Viktor Vekselberg, businessman (Jewish father)
- Leo Wainstein, textile industrialist
- Harry, Albert, Sam, and Jack Warner, founders of Warner Bros.
- Sergey Brin, is an American computer scientist and businessman who co-founded Google.
- Jan Koum, is an American billionaire businessman and computer programmer.

== Scientists ==
=== Natural scientists ===
- Anatole Abragam, physicist
- Alexei Alexeyevich Abrikosov, physicist (Jewish mother), Nobel Prize (2003)
- Zhores Alferov, physicist, Nobel Prize (2000)
- Aleksander Akhiezer, physicist
- Semen Altshuler, physicist
- Lev Artsimovich, physicist (Jewish mother)
- Varvara Brilliant-Lerman, plant physiologist
- Matvei Bronstein, theoretical physicist
- Gersh Budker, nuclear physicist
- Ilya Frank, physicist, Nobel Prize (1958)
- Yakov Frenkel, physicist
- Vitaly Ginzburg, physicist, Nobel Prize (2003)
- Emanuel Goldberg (1881–1970), pioneered Microdots and microfilm retrieval technology
- Alexander Gorodnitsky, geologist and oceanographer, Soviet and Russian bard and poet
- Vladimir Gribov, physicist
- Mikhail Gurevich, co-founder of the Mikoyan Gurevich (MiG) aircraft design bureau
- Waldemar Haffkine, biologist, vaccine against cholera and plague
- Boris Hessen, physicist
- Naum Idelson, astronomer
- Abram Ioffe, nuclear scientist
- Vladimir Keilis-Borok, physicist
- Isaak Khalatnikov, physicist
- Yuli Khariton, physicist
- Semyon Kosberg, engineer
- Lev Landau, physicist, Nobel Prize (1962)
- Grigory Landsberg, physicist
- Semyon Lavochkin, engineer
- Veniamin Levich, electrochemist
- Evgeny Lifshitz, physicist
- Leonid Mandelstam, physicist
- Alexander Migdal, physicist
- Arkady Migdal, physicist
- Lev Pitaevskii, physicist
- Boris Podolsky, physicist
- Alexander Polyakov, physicist
- Isaak Pomeranchuk, physicist
- Grigory Abramovich Shajn, astronomer
- Mikhail Shifman, physicist
- Iosif Shklovsky, astrophysicist, astronomer, biologist
- Alexander Tropsha, chemist
- Vladimir Veksler, physicist
- Alexander Vilenkin, cosmologist
- Selman Waksman, biochemist, Nobel Prize (1952)
- Grigoriy Yablonsky, chemical engineer
- Sorojon Yusufova, geologist
- Yakov Zel'dovich, astrophysicist

=== Mathematicians ===
- Georgy Adelson-Velsky, mathematician
- Naum Akhiezer, mathematician
- Vladimir Arnold, mathematician
- Grigory Barenblatt, mathematician
- Joseph Bernstein, mathematician
- Alexander Brudno, mathematician
- Chudnovsky brothers, amateur mathematicians
- Vladimir Drinfeld, mathematician, Fields Medal (1990)
- Eugene Dynkin, mathematician
- Paul Sophus Epstein, mathematician
- Felix Gantmacher, mathematician
- Israel Gelfand, mathematician
- Alexander Gelfond, mathematician
- Semyon Aranovich Gershgorin, mathematician
- Victor Kac, mathematician
- David Kazhdan, mathematician
- Aleksandr Khinchin, mathematician
- Mark Krasnoselsky, mathematician
- Mark Krein, mathematician,
- Alexander Kronrod, mathematician
- Yevgeniy Landis, mathematician
- Solomon Lefschetz, mathematician
- Vladimir Levenshtein, mathematician
- Leonid Levin, mathematician, computational complexity theory
- Jacob Levitzki, Ukrainian-Israeli mathematician
- Grigory Margulis, mathematician, Fields Medal (1978)
- David Milman, mathematician
- Hermann Minkowski, mathematician
- Mark Naimark, mathematician
- Grigori Perelman, mathematician, Fields Medal (2006, declined)
- Vladimir Rokhlin, mathematician
- Jakob Rosanes, mathematician
- Lev Schnirelmann, mathematician
- Zvi Hermann Schapira, mathematician
- Moses Schönfinkel, logician
- Samuil Shatunovsky, mathematician
- Yakov G. Sinai, applied mathematician
- Boris Tsirelson, mathematician
- Pavel Urysohn, mathematician
- Boris Weisfeiler, mathematician
- Victor Zalgaller, mathematician
- Oscar Zariski, mathematician
- Efim Zelmanov, mathematician, Fields Medal (1994)

=== Social scientists and philosophers ===
- Urie Bronfenbrenner, developmental psychologist
- Solomon Buber, Hebraist
- Ariel Durant, historian
- Boris Eichenbaum, historian
- Mikhail Epstein, literary theorist
- Moshe Feldenkrais, inventor of the Feldenkrais method
- Alexander Gerschenkron, economic historian
- Jean Gottmann, geographer
- Lazar Gulkowitsch, Jewish Studies scholar
- Abraham Harkavy, historian
- Zellig Harris, linguist
- Roman Jakobson, Russian/American linguist
- Naum Krasner, economist
- Leonid Hurwicz, economist, Nobel Prize (2007)
- Simon Kuznets, economist, Nobel Prize (1971)
- Juri Lotman, prominent semiotician and historian of culture
- Seymour Lubetzky, cataloging theorist
- Jacob Marschak, economist
- Alexander Luria, neuropsychologist
- Benzion Netanyahu, encyclopedist, historian and father of Benjamin Netanyahu
- Alexander Nove, economist
- Jacob Rabinow, inventor
- Ayn Rand, philosopher
- Anatol Rapoport, game theorist
- Dietmar Rosenthal, linguist
- Leonid Roshal, pediatrician, negotiator
- Isaak Russman, historian
- Max Seligsohn, Orientalist
- Lev Shestov, philosopher
- Elye Spivak, linguist

== Medical scientists and physicians ==
- Isaac Andreyevich Chatzkin, physician
- Yevsey Gindes, pediatrician
- Gavriil Ilizarov, orthopaedic surgeon
- Isaac Trachtenberg, hygienist
- Mikhail Varshavski, family medicine physician and YouTuber, known online as Doctor Mike

== Cultural figures ==
=== Fine artists ===
- Michael Matusevitch (1929–2007), painter
- Eugene Abeshaus, painter
- Meer Akselrod, painter
- Benish Mininberg, painter
- Nathan Altman, painter and stage designer from Vinnytsia
- Boris Anisfeld, painter, theatre
- Mark Antokolsky, sculptor
- Boris Aronson, painter and designer
- Isaak Asknaziy, painter
- Mordechai Avniel, painter
- Léon Bakst, painter and costume designer
- Abraham Berline, painter
- Eugène Berman, painter
- Leonid Berman, painter
- Mikhail Bernshtein, painter
- Isaak Brodskiy, painter
- Marc Chagall, painter from Vitebsk
- Bella Chagall, wife of Marc Chagall
- Joseph Chaikov, sculptor
- Ilya Chashnik, painter
- Nudie Cohn, fashion designer
- Sonia Delaunay, painter
- Robert Falk, painter
- Naum Gabo, sculptor
- Moisei Ginzburg, architect
- Michail Grobman, painter
- Michel Kikoine, painter
- Boris Iofan, architect
- Ilya Kabakov, conceptual artist (Jewish father)
- Komar and Melamid, art-duo
- Jacob Kramer, painter
- Pinchus Kremegne, painter
- Jankieĺ Kruhier, painter
- Morris Lapidus, architect
- Felix Lembersky painter
- Isaac Levitan, painter
- El Lissitzky, designer
- Louise Nevelson, sculptor
- Ernst Neizvestny, sculptor
- Solomon Nikritin, painter
- Jules Olitski, painter
- Leonid Pasternak, painter
- Antoine Pevsner, sculptor
- Issachar Rybak, painter from Yelizavetgrad
- Semion Rotnitsky, painter
- David Shterenberg, painter from Zhitomir
- Chaïm Soutine, painter from Minsk
- Raphael Soyer, American painter
- Israel Tsvaygenbaum, Russian-American painter
- Joseph Tepper, painter
- Vladimir Weisberg, painter
- Josephinne Yaroshevich, painter
- Lazar Yazgur, painter
- Valentin Yudashkin, fashion designer
- Ossip Zadkine, sculptor (Jewish father)
- Saveliy Moiseyevich Zeydenberg, painter

=== Musicians ===
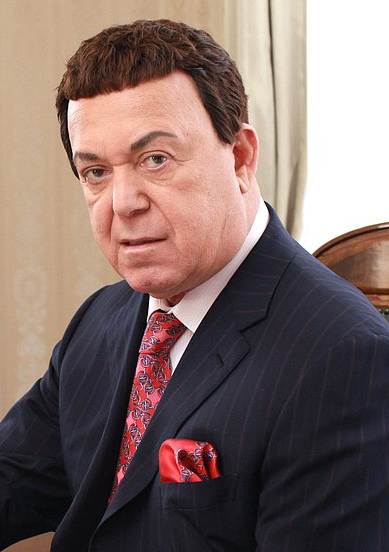
Joseph Kobzon, Russia's most decorated artist, often described as the "Russian Sinatra"

- Sophia Agranovich, pianist
- Leonid Agutin, singer-songwriter
- Joseph Achron, composer
- Modest Altschuler, cellist, conductor, and composer
- Lera Auerbach, composer/pianist
- Vladimir Ashkenazi, pianist (Jewish father)
- Sidor Belarsky, operatic vocalist and music educator
- Nina Brodskaya, singer
- Yefim Bronfman, pianist
- Simon Barere, pianist
- Rudolf Barshai, conductor
- Dimitri Bashkirow, pianist
- Yuri Bashmet, violist
- Irving Berlin composer and lyricist
- Lazar Berman, pianist
- Mark Bernes, singer and actor
- Matvei Blanter, composer, author of Katyusha
- Shura Cherkassky, pianist
- Vladimir Dashkevich, composer, wrote music for Sherlock Holmes and Dr. Watson
- Bella Davidovich, pianist
- Issay Dobrowen, pianist and composer
- Larisa Dolina, singer
- Isaak Dunayevsky, composer
- Mischa Elman, violinist
- Mark Ermler, conductor m I
- Anthony Fedorov, singer, American Idol finalist
- Samuil Feinberg, composer
- Mikhaïl Faerman, pianist
- Vladimir Feltsman, pianist
- Veniamin Fleishman, composer
- Yakov Flier, pianist
- Yan Frenkel, composer
- Grigory Frid, songwriter
- Artur Friedheim, composer
- Kirill Gerstein, pianist
- Josef Gingold (1909–1995) violinist
- Grigory Ginsburg, pianist
- Emil Gilels, pianist
- Grigory Ginzburg, conductor
- Mark Gorenstein, conductor
- Emil Gorovets, singer
- Maria Grinberg, pianist
- Natalia Gutman, cellist
- Tamara Gverdtsiteli, singer
- Jascha Heifetz, violinist
- Mordechai Hershman, chazzan
- Jascha Horenstein, conductor
- Vladimir Horowitz, pianist
- Aleksey Igudesman, violinist
- Oleg Kagan, violinist
- Ilya Kaler, violinist
- Tina Karol, singer
- Boris Khaykin, conductor
- Evgeny Kissin, pianist
- Alexander Knaifel, composer
- Joseph Kobzon, singer
- Leonid Kogan, violinist
- Mikhail Kopelman, violinist
- Yakov Kreizberg, conductor
- Maya Kristalinskaya, singer
- Igor Krutoy, composer, pianist
- Josef Lhévinne, pianist
- Alexander Lokshin, composer (Jewish father)
- Arthur Lourié, composer
- Andrey Makarevich, singer-songwriter
- Oleg Maisenberg, pianist
- Samuel Maykapar, composer/pianist
- Nathan Milstein, violinist
- Lolita Milyavskaya, singer (Jewish father)
- Shlomo Mintz, violinist
- Boris Moiseev, dancer, showmaker
- Benno Moiseiwitsch, pianist
- Larisa Mondrus, singer
- Alexander Mordukhovich, composer
- Vadim Mulerman, singer
- David Oistrakh, violinist
- Igor Oistrakh, violinist (Jewish father)
- Leo Ornstein, composer
- Gregor Piatigorsky, cellist
- Pokrass brothers, composers
- Mikhael Rauchverger, pianist and composer
- Viktor Reznikov, composer, singer
- Alexander Rosenbaum, singer-songwriter
- Anton Rubinstein, pianist/composer
- Nikolai Rubinstein, pianist/composer
- Samuil Samosud, conductor
- Alfred Schnittke, composer (Jewish father)
- Eduard Schmieder, conductor
- Joseph Schillinger, composer, music theorist, and composition teacher
- Vladimir Shainsky, composer
- Daniil Shafran, cellist
- Mihail Shufutinskiy, singer, music producer
- Leo Sirota, pianist
- Regina Spektor, singer-songwriter and pianist
- Isaac Stern, violinist
- Yevgeny Sudbin, pianist
- Mikhail Tanich, songwriter
- Alexander Tsfasman, jazz pianist, composer, conductor, arranger
- Sophie Tucker, singer
- Lyubov Uspenskaya, singer (Jewish father)
- Leonid Utyosov, singer and actor
- Anzhelika Varum, singer Aida Vedishcheva, singer
- Maxim Vengerov, violinist
- Alexander Veprik, composer
- DJ Vlad, DJ, producer, interviewer, journalist, and YouTuber
- Maria Yudina, pianist
- Yakov Zak, pianist
- Zedd, Russian-German DJ
- Inna Zhvanetskaya, composer
- Efrem Zimbalist, Russian-born American violinist

=== Performing artists ===
- Jacob Adler, actor
- Anatoly Adoskin, actor (Jewish father)
- Alexander Alov, film director and screenwriter
- Lev Arnshtam, film director
- Dmitry Astrakhan, film director and actor
- Abram Avdalimov, stage actor and theatre director
- Leonid Bronevoy, actor
- Elina Bystritskaya, actress
- Grigori Chukhrai, film director and screenwriter, father of Pavel Chukhrai
- Pavel Chukhrai, film director and screenwriter, son of Grigori Chukhrai
- Maya Deren, filmmaker
- Lev Dodin, theater director
- Mark Donskoi, film director
- Aleksandr Druz, longest-running contestant on the What? Where? When? game show. "Magister of the Game"
- Boris Efimov, cartoonist
- Sergei Eisenstein, film director (Jewish father)
- Fridrikh Ermler, film director, actor, and screenwriter
- Vladimir Etush, actor
- Semyon Farada, actor
- Aleksandr Faintsimmer, cinematographer
- Maxim Galkin, comedian
- Valentin Gaft, actor
- Oleg Gazmanov, singer
- Zinovy Gerdt, actor
- Aleksei German, cinematographer
- Vitaliy Ginzburg, director
- Alexander Goldstein, director
- Abraham Goldfaden (1840–1908), playwright and theatre director
- Yuli Gusman, director
- Alexander Gutman, director
- Roman Izyaev, stage actor and theatre director
- Roman Abelevich Kachanov, animator
- Aleksei Kapler, film artist
- Roman Karmen, documentary filmmaker
- Roman Kartsev, comedian
- Boris Kaufman, cinematographer
- Mikhail Kaufman, cinematographer
- Yevgeny Khaldei, photographer
- Gennady Khazanov, comedian
- Iosif Kheifits, film director
- Ilya Khrzhanovsky, film director
- Yefim Kopelyan, actor
- Mikhail Kozakov, actor
- Grigori Kozintsev, theater and film director
- Savely Kramarov, actor
- Mila Kunis, actress
- Yuri Levitan, radio announcer
- Anatole Litvak, director
- Solomon Mikhoels, actor and director
- Andrei Mironov, actor and singer, Jewish father
- Alexander Mitta, film director
- Julius Nathanson, actor
- Alla Nazimova, actress
- Vladimir Naumov, director
- Yuri Norstein, animator
- Klara Novikova (born Herzer), comedian
- Ilya Oleynikov (Klyaver), comedic actor
- Maya Plisetskaya, ballerina
- Iosif Prut, playwright
- Yuli Raizman, film director and screenwriter
- Elena Ralph, model
- Faina Ranevskaya, actress
- Arkady Raikin, comedian
- Konstantin Raikin, actor and theatre director
- Mikhail Romm, film director, scriptwriter, and educator (Jewish father)
- Abram Room, film director
- Grigori Roshal, film director and screenwriter
- Hanna Rovina, actress
- Ida Rubinstein, dancer
- Lev Shekhtman, theater director and actor
- Alexander Schirwindt, actor, director and screenwriter
- Mikhail Schweitzer, screenwriter
- Yefim Shifrin, comedian
- Viktor Shenderovich, humorist
- Esfir Shub, editor, director, and writer of documentary films
- Yakov Smirnoff, American comedian
- Lee Strasberg, acting teacher
- Genndy Tartakovsky, Russian-born American animation director
- Leonid Trauberg, film director, scriptwriter, and educator
- Ivan Urgant, actor, comedian, host of the Evening Urgant television show
- Dziga Vertov, documentary film director and film theoretician
- Vladimir Vinokur, comedian (Jewish father)
- Leonid Yakubovich, actor, host of the Pole Chudes television show
- Leonid Yarmolnik, actor
- Anton Yelchin, Russian-born American film/television actor
- Sergei Yursky, actor
- Sergei Yutkevich, film director and screenwriter

== Writers and poets ==
- Grigory Adamov, writer
- M. Ageyev, novelist
- David Aizman, writer and playwright
- Vasily Aksyonov, writer (Jewish mother)
- Sholom Aleichem, Yiddish-language writer
- Semyon Altov (born Altshuller), writer, comedian
- Isaac Asimov, science fiction writer
- Daniil Atnilov, poet
- Hizgil Avshalumov, novelist, poet and playwright
- Isaac Babel, writer
- Eduard Bagritsky, poet
- Grigory Baklanov, novelist
- Mishi Bakhshiev, writer and poet
- Devorah Baron, writer
- Agniya Barto, writer
- Eliezer Ben-Yehuda, Hebrew-language writer
- Isaac Dov Berkowitz, writer
- Hayyim Nahman Bialik, poet
- Rachel Bluwstein, poet
- Yosef Haim Brenner, Hebrew-language writer
- Osip Brik, author
- Joseph Brodsky, Russian-language poet, Nobel Prize (1987)
- Sasha Cherny, poet
- Korney Chukovsky, writer (Jewish father)
- Manuvakh Dadashev, poet
- Yuli Daniel, writer
- Michael Dorfman, journalist and essayist
- Sergei Dovlatov, journalist and writer (Jewish father)
- David Edelstadt, Yiddish-language anarchist poet
- Ilya Ehrenburg, writer
- Natan Eidelman, writer
- Alter Esselin, poet, carpenter
- Alexander Galich, playwright poet
- Vladimir Galperin, journalist and writer, literature professor
- Boris Gavrilov, poet
- Mikhail Gavrilov, writer and poet
- Masha Gessen, writer and journalist
- Asher Hirsch Ginsberg (Ahad Ha'Am), Hebrew-language writer
- Lydia Ginzburg, writer
- Yevgenia Ginzburg, writer
- Jacob Gordin, American playwright
- Leon Gordon, writer
- Grigori Gorin, playwright and writer
- Vasily Grossman, writer
- Igor Guberman, writer
- Peretz Hirshbein, playwright
- Ilya Ilf, writer
- Vera Inber, poet
- Sergey Izgiyayev, poet
- Lev Kassil, writer
- Veniamin Kaverin, writer (Jewish father)
- Arkady Khait, satirist and playwright (Хайт, Аркадий Иосифович)
- A.M. Klein, poet
- Pavel Kogan, poet
- Lev Kopelev, author and dissident
- Lazar Lagin, writer
- H. Leivick, dramatist
- Clarice Lispector, writer that settled in Brazil fleeing from Ukraine Civil's War
- Benedikt Livshits, writer
- Nadezhda Mandelstam, writer
- Osip Mandelstam, poet
- Samuil Marshak, poet
- Yunna Morits, poet
- Semen Nadson, poet (Jewish father)
- Seva Novgorodsev, musician and journalist (Jewish father)
- Grigoriy Oster, author and scriptwriter
- Yeremey Parnov, writer
- Boris Pasternak, writer, Nobel Prize (1958)
- Yakov Perelman, writer
- Elizaveta Polonskaya, translator, poet
- Vladimir Posner, writer
- David Pinski, writer
- Lev Razgon, writer, gulag inmate for 17 years
- Yevgeny Rein, poet
- Ayn Rand, writer (born Alisa Rosenbaum)
- Ilya Reznik, poet and songwriter
- Anatoli Rybakov, writer
- David Samoylov, poet
- Genrikh Sapgir, poet
- Natalya Sats, playwright (Jewish father)
- Zoya Semenduyeva, poet
- Mendele Mocher Sforim, founder of modern Yiddish and modern Hebrew literature
- Viktor Shklovsky, writer and critic (Jewish father)
- Ilia Shtemler, writer
- Gary Shteyngart (Steinhart), writer
- Yulian Semyonov, writer
- Elena Shirman, poet
- Boris Slutsky, war-time poet
- Mikhail Slonimsky, writer (Jewish father)
- Boris and Arkady Strugatsky, science fiction writers (Jewish father)
- Mikhail Svetlov, poet
- Leon Talmi, journalist, killed on the Night of the Murdered Poets
- Shaul Tchernichovsky, poet and translator
- Yuri Tynyanov, writer
- Vladimir Voinovich, writer
- Vladimir Vysotsky, poet, singer, actor (Jewish father)
- Semen Yushkevich, writer and playwright
- Boris Zakhoder, children's poet and writer
- Mikhail Zhvanetsky, writer and comedian
- Zinovy Zinik, writer
- Valentin Zorin, Soviet and Russian political commentator, journalist, author, screenwriter and television presenter.

== Religious figures ==
- Israel Isaac Kahanovitch, Orthodox Jewish rabbi
- Raïssa Maritain, Catholic writer and philosopher
- Alexander Men, Russian Orthodox priest, theologian, Biblical scholar and writer.
- Samuel Isaac Joseph Schereschewsky, Anglican Bishop of Shanghai, China, from 1877 to 1884

== Sport figures ==
=== Chess ===
- Lev Alburt
- Yuri Averbakh
- Alexander Beliavsky
- Ossip Bernstein
- Benjamin Blumenfeld
- Isaac Boleslavsky
- Mikhail Botvinnik, World Champion
- David Bronstein, World Championship challenger
- Mikhail Tal
- Maxim Dlugy
- Iossif Dorfman
- Mark Dvoretsky
- Louis Eisenberg
- Yakov Estrin
- Alexander Evensohn
- Salo Flohr
- Semen Furman
- Boris Gelfand
- Efim Geller
- Eduard Gufeld
- Boris Gulko
- Dmitry Gurevich
- Ilya Gurevich
- Mikhail Gurevich
- Nicolai Jasnogrodsky
- Gregory Kaidanov
- Ilya Kan
- Garry Kasparov, World Champion
- Alexander Khalifman, FIDE World Champion
- Alexander Konstantinopolsky
- Viktor Korchnoi, World Championship challenger
- Ljuba Kristol
- Alla Kushnir, Women's World Championship challenger
- Anatoly Lein
- Konstantin Lerner
- Grigory Levenfish
- Irina Levitina
- Vladimir Liberzon
- Andor Lilienthal
- Moishe Lowtzky
- Vladimir Malaniuk
- Sam Palatnik
- Ernest Pogosyants
- Iosif Pogrebyssky
- Lev Polugaevsky
- Lev Psakhis
- Abram Rabinovich
- Ilya Rabinovich
- Leonid Shamkovich
- Ilya Smirin
- Gennadi Sosonko
- Leonid Stein
- Peter Svidler
- Mark Taimanov
- Boris Verlinsky
- Yakov Vilner
- Leonid Yudasin

=== Boxing ===
- Yuri Foreman, Belarusian-born Israeli US middleweight and World Boxing Association champion super welterweight
- Louis Kaplan ("Kid Kaplan"), Russian-born US, world champion featherweight, Hall of Fame
- Shamil Sabirov, Russia, Olympic champion light flyweight

=== Canoeing ===
- Leonid Geishtor, USSR (Belarus), sprint canoer, Olympic champion (Canadian pairs 1,000-meter)
- Michael Kolganov, Soviet (Uzbek)-born Israeli, sprint canoer, world champion, Olympic bronze (K-1 500-meter)
- Naum Prokupets, Moldovan-born Soviet, sprint canoer, Olympic bronze (C-2 1,000-meter), gold (C-2 10,000-meter) at ICF Canoe Sprint World Championships

=== Fencing ===
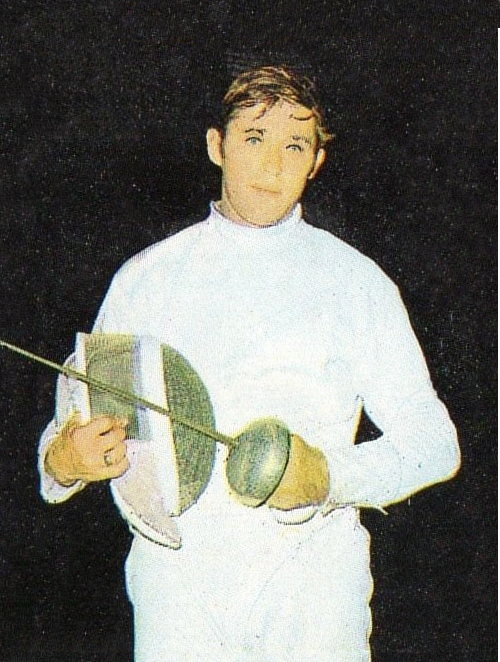
Grigory Kriss

- Yury Gelman (born 1955), Ukrainian-born American Olympic fencing coach
- Vadim Gutzeit, Ukraine (saber), Olympic champion
- Grigory Kriss, Soviet (épée), Olympic champion, 2x silver
- Maria Mazina, Russia (épée), Olympic champion, bronze
- Mark Midler, Soviet (foil), 2x Olympic champion
- Mark Rakita, Soviet (saber), 2x Olympic champion, 2x silver
- Yakov Rylsky, Soviet (saber), Olympic champion
- Sergey Sharikov, Russia (saber), 2x Olympic champion, silver, bronze
- David Tyshler, Soviet (saber), Olympic bronze
- Eduard Vinokurov, Russia (saber), 2x Olympic champion, silver
- Iosif Vitebskiy, Soviet (épée), Olympic silver, 10x national champion

=== Figure skating ===
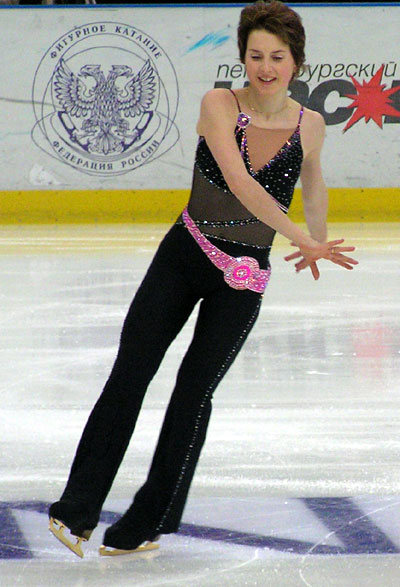
Irina Slutskaya

- Ilya Averbukh, Russia, ice dancer, Olympic silver
- Oksana Baiul, Ukraine, figure skater, Olympic gold, world champion
- Alexei Beletski, Ukrainian-born Israeli, ice dancer, Olympian
- Sasha Cohen, figure skater (U.S. National Champion and silver medalist at the 2006 Winter Olympics)
- Aleksandr Gorelik, Soviet, pair skater, Olympic silver, World Championship 2x silver, bronze
- Natalia Gudina, Ukrainian-born Israeli, figure skater, Olympian
- Gennadi Karponossov, Russia, ice dancer and coach, Olympic gold, World Championship 2x gold, silver, 2x bronze
- Michael Shmerkin, Soviet-born Israeli, figure skater
- Irina Slutskaya, Russia, figure skater, Olympic silver, bronze, World Championship 2x gold, 3x silver, bronze
- Maxim Staviski, Russian-born Bulgarian, ice dancer, World Championship gold, silver, bronze
- Alexandra Zaretski, Belarusian-born Israeli, ice dancer, Olympian
- Roman Zaretski, Belarusian-born Israeli, ice dancer, Olympian

=== Football (American) ===
- Joe Magidsohn, Russia, halfback
- Igor Olshansky, Ukraine, defensive lineman (Miami Dolphins)

=== Gymnastics ===
- Evgeny (or Yevgeny) Babich, Soviet, Olympic champion, world and European champion, 2x runner-up
- Yanina Batyrchina, Russia, Olympic silver (rhythmic gymnastics)
- Maria Gorokhovskaya, USSR, Olympic 2x champion (all-around individual exercises, team combined exercises), 5x silver (vault, asymmetrical bars, balance beam, floor exercises, team exercises with portable apparatus)
- Natalia Laschenova, USSR, Olympic champion (team)
- Tatiana Lysenko, Soviet/Ukrainian, 2x Olympic champion (balance beam, team combined exercises), bronze (horse vault)
- Mikhail Perelman, USSR, Olympic champion (team combined exercises)
- Vladimir Portnoi, USSR, Olympic silver (team combined exercises) and bronze (long horse vault)
- Yulia Raskina, Belarus, Olympic silver (rhythmic gymnastics)
- Alexander Shatilov, Uzbekistan/Israel, world bronze (artistic gymnast; floor exercises)
- Yelena Shushunova, USSR, Olympic 2x champion (all-around, team), silver (balance beam), bronze (uneven bars)

=== Ice hockey ===
- Max Birbraer, Russian from Kazakhstan; lived and played in Israel; 1st Israeli drafted by NHL team (New Jersey Devils)
- Vitaly Davydov, Soviet, defenseman, 3x Olympic champion, world and European champion 1963–71, runner-up
- Alfred Kuchevsky, Soviet, Olympic champion, bronze
- Yuri Lyapkin, Soviet, defenceman, Olympic champion
- Yuri Moiseev, Soviet, Olympic champion, world champion
- Vladimir Myshkin, Soviet, goaltender, Olympic champion, silver
- Ian Rubin, Ukraine/Australia, Russia national team
- Yevgeni Zimin, Soviet, Olympic champion 1968–72, world and European champion 1968–69, 1971
- Viktor Zinger, Soviet, Olympic champion; world champion 1965–69

=== Judo ===
- Ārons Bogoļubovs, USSR, Olympic bronze (lightweight)

=== Rugby league ===
- Ian Rubin, Ukraine/Australia, Russia national team

=== Sailing ===
- Valentyn Mankin, Soviet/Ukraine, only sailor in Olympic history to win gold medals in three different classes (yachting: finn class, tempest class, and star class), silver (yachting, tempest class)

=== Shooting ===
- Lev Vainshtein, USSR (Russia), 3x team world champion (25 m and 50 m pistol) and Olympic bronze medalist (300 m rifle)

=== Soccer (association football) ===
- Leonid Buryak, USSR/Ukraine, midfielder, Olympic bronze
- Yakov Ehrlich, Russia, striker
- Andriy Oberemko, Ukraine, midfielder (Illichivets and U21 national team)
- Boris Razinsky, USSR/Russia, goalkeeper/striker, Olympic champion, manager
- Boris Borisovich Rotenberg, Russia/Finland/Israel, defender
- Mordechai Spiegler, Soviet Union/Israel, striker (Israel national team), manager

=== Speed skating ===
- Rafayel Grach, USSR, Olympic silver (500-meter), bronze (500-meter)

=== Swimming ===
- Vadim Alexeev, Kazakhstan-born Israeli, breaststroke
- Semyon Belits-Geiman, USSR, Olympic silver (400-m freestyle relay) and bronze (800-m freestyle relay); world record in men's 800-m freestyle
- Lenny Krayzelburg, Ukrainian-born US, 4x Olympic champion (100-m backstroke, 200-m backstroke, twice 4x100-m medley relay); 3x world champion (100-m and 200-m backstroke, 4×100-m medley) and 2x silver (4×100-m medley, 50-m backstroke); 3 world records (50-, 100-, and 200-m backstroke)

=== Table tennis ===
- Marina Kravchenko, Ukrainian-born Israeli, Soviet and Israel national teams

=== Tennis ===
- Anna Smashnova (born 1976), Belarus-born Israeli tennis player

=== Track and field ===
- Aleksandr Averbukh, Russian-born Israeli, 2002 and 2006 European champion (pole vault)
- Maria Leontyavna Itkina, USSR, sprinter, world records (400-m & 220-yards, and 800-m relay)
- Svetlana Krachevskaya, USSR, shot put, Olympic silver
- Vera Krepkina, USSR, Olympic champion (long jump), world records (100-m dash and 4x100-m)
- Faina Melnik, Ukrainian-born USSR, 11 world records; Olympic discus throw champion
- Zhanna Pintusevich-Block, Ukraine, sprinter, world 100-m and 200-m champion
- Irina Press, USSR, 2x Olympic champion (80-m hurdles and pentathlon)
- Tamara Press, USSR, 6 world records (shot put and discus); 3x Olympic champion (2x shot put and discus) and silver (discus)

=== Volleyball ===
- Nelly Abramova, USSR, Olympic silver
- Larisa Bergen, USSR, Olympic silver
- Yefim Chulak, USSR, Olympic silver, bronze
- Nataliya Kushnir, USSR, Olympic silver
- Yevgeny Lapinsky, USSR, Olympic champion, bronze
- Georgy Mondzolevsky, USSR, 2x Olympic champion, 2x world champion
- Vladimir Patkin, USSR, Olympic silver, bronze
- Yuriy Venherovsky, USSR, Olympic champion

=== Water polo ===
- Boris Goikhman, USSR, goalkeeper, Olympic silver, bronze
- Nikolai Melnikov, USSR, Olympic champion

=== Weightlifting ===
- Moisei Kas’ianik, Ukrainian-born USSR, world champion
- Grigory Novak, Soviet, Olympic silver (middle-heavyweight); world champion
- Rudolf Plyukfelder, Soviet, Olympic champion, 2x world champion (light heavyweight)
- David Rigert, Kazakh-born USSR, Olympic champion, 5x world champion (light-heavyweight and heavyweight), 68 world records
- Igor Rybak, Ukrainian-born USSR, Olympic champion (lightweight)
- Valery Shary, Byelorussian-born USSR, Olympic champion (light-heavyweight)

=== Wrestling ===
- Grigorii Gamarnik, USSR, world champion (Greco-Roman lightweight), world championship silver
- Samuel Gerson, Ukrainian-born US, Olympic silver (freestyle featherweight)
- Boris Maksovich Gurevich, Soviet, Olympic champion (Greco-Roman flyweight), 2x world champion
- Boris Michail Gurevitsch, USSR, Olympic champion (freestyle middleweight), 2x world champion
- Oleg Karavaev, USSR, Olympic champion (Greco-Roman bantamweight), 2x world champion
- Yakov Punkin, Soviet, Olympic champion (Greco-Roman featherweight)
- David Rudman, USSR, world championship bronze

=== Other sports ===
- Elena Altshul, Women's World Draughts Champion
- Nikolay Epstein, Soviet hockey coach
- Alexander Gomelsky, Soviet basketball coach
- Andriy Oberemko, footballer
- Grigory Surkis, chairman of the Football Federation of Ukraine

== See also ==
- Bukharan Jews
- History of the Jews in Russia and the Soviet Union
- List of Galician Jews
- Lists of Jews
- List of Russians
