= List of Ukrainian Jews =

Presented below are lists of famous or notable Ukrainian people of Jewish descent and other Jews born in the territory of present-day Ukraine, including those born before the 20th century in what were then borderland regions in the Polish–Lithuanian Commonwealth (later in the Russian Partition and Austrian Partition).

== Athletes ==
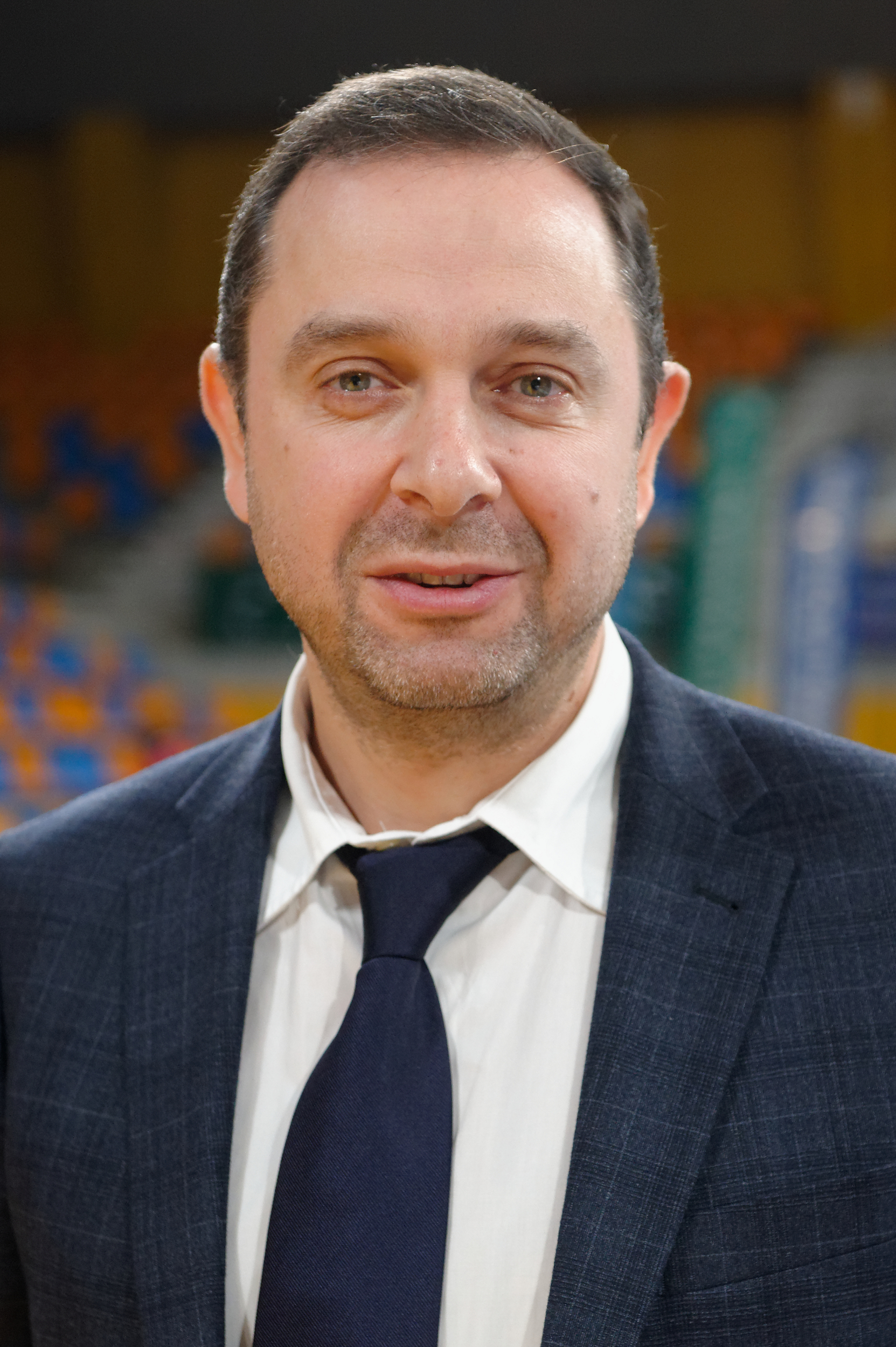
Vadym Gutzeit

- Oksana Baiul, figure skater, Olympic gold
- Alexei Beletski, Ukrainian-born Israeli, ice dancer, Olympian
- Oleksii Bychenko, Ukrainian-born Israeli, figure skater, 2016 European silver medallist, Olympian
- Artem Dolgopyat, Ukrainian-born Israeli, Olympic gold (artistic gymnast - floor) for Israel
- Olena Dvornichenko, Israel/Ukraine, rhythmic gymnastics
- Grigoriy Gamarnik, Ukrainian-born Soviet, world wrestling champion (Greco-Roman lightweight), world championship gold and silver
- Samuel Gerson, Ukrainian-born US, Olympic silver wrestling (freestyle featherweight)
- Natalia Gudina, Ukrainian-born Israeli, figure skater, Olympian
- Vadym Gutzeit (born 1971), saber fencer, Olympic champion, Youth and Sport Minister of Ukraine
- Pavlo Ishchenko ("Wild Man"), Ukraine/Israel, bantamweight & lightweight boxer, 2x European Amateur Boxing Championships medalist, and European Games medalist
- Moisei Kas’ianik, Ukrainian-born USSR, world weightlifting champion
- Marina Kravchenko, Ukrainian-born Israeli, Soviet and Israel national table tennis teams
- Lenny Krayzelburg, Ukrainian-born US swimmer, 4x Olympic champion (100 m backstroke, 200-m backstroke, twice 4x100-m medley relay); 3x world champion (100 m and 200-m backstroke, 4×100-m medley) and 2x silver (4×100-m medley, 50-m backstroke); 3 world records (50-, 100-, and 200-m backstroke)
- Grigory Kriss (born 1940), Ukrainian Soviet Olympic épée fencer who won four Olympic medals, including a gold medal
- Tatiana Lysenko, USSR/Ukraine gymnast, 2x Olympic champion (balance beam, team combined exercises), bronze (horse vault)
- Valeria Maksyuta, Ukraine/Israel gymnast, multiple World Cup medalist, Israeli Olympian, Maccabiah Games champion
- Valentyn Mankin, Soviet/Ukraine, only sailor in Olympic history to win gold medals in three different classes (yachting: finn class, tempest class, and star class), silver (yachting, tempest class)
- Faina Melnik, Ukrainian-born USSR, 11 world records; Olympic discus throw champion
- Andriy Oberemko, soccer/football midfielder (Mariupol & U21 national team)
- Igor Olshansky, NFL American football defensive end
- Zhanna Pintusevich-Block, Ukraine, sprinter, world 100-m & 200-m champion
- Katerina Pisetsky, Israel/Ukraine, rhythmic gymnast
- Maxim Podoprigora, Ukrainian-born Austrian swimmer
- Ian Rubin, Ukraine/Australia, Russia national rugby league team
- Igor Rybak, Ukrainian-born USSR, Olympic weightlifting champion (lightweight)
- David Tyshler (1927–2014), Ukraine-born Soviet sabre fencer, Olympic bronze medalist
- Yulen Uralov (1924–2026), Ukrainian Soviet Olympic foil fencer, and USSR champion
- Iosif Vitebskiy (born 1938), Soviet Ukrainian Olympic medalist and world champion épée fencer, and current US fencing coach
- Alexei Zhitnik, Ukraine-born hockey defenseman (NHL)
- Aleksandr Kolchinsky, heavyweight Greco-Roman wrestler, Olympic gold.

== Politicians ==
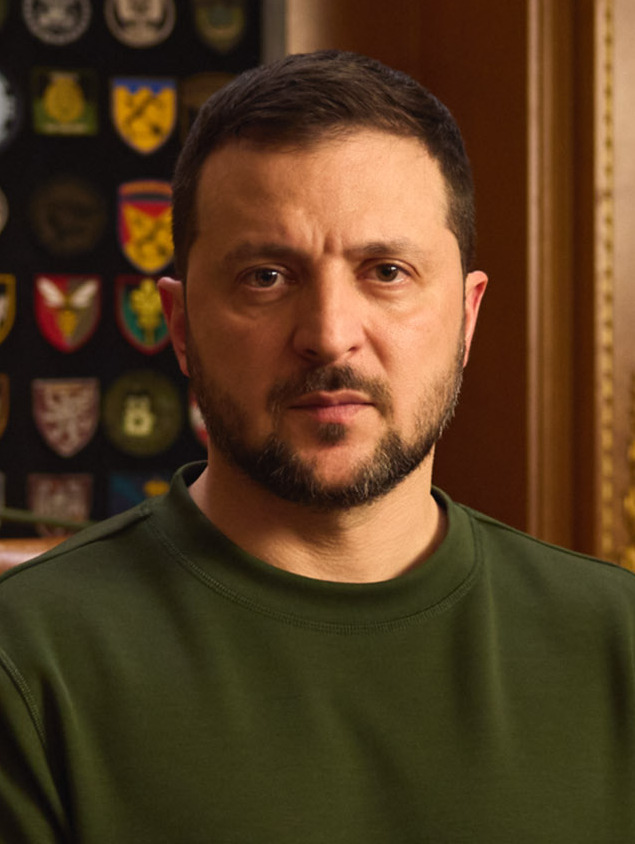
President of Ukraine Volodymyr Zelenskyy

- Mykhailo Dobkin, former governor of Kharkiv Oblast 2010-2014
- Volodymyr Groysman, former Prime Minister of Ukraine (2016–2019)
- Hennadiy Kernes, Mayor of Kharkiv 2010–2020
- Ihor Kolomoyskyi, former Governor of Dnipropetrovsk Oblast 2014-2015
- Pinhas Krasny, Ukrainian minister of Jewish Affairs for the Directorate of Ukraine
- Serhii Mazlakh, pioneer of National Communism
- Vadim Rabinovich, 2014 presidential candidate
- Moisei Rafes, deputy secretary of National Affairs (Jewish Affairs) for the General Secretariat
- Abraham Revutsky, Ukrainian minister of Jewish Affairs for the Directorate of Ukraine
- Volodymyr Zelenskyy, President of Ukraine (2019–present)
- Moishe Zilberfarb, deputy secretary of National Affairs (Jewish Affairs) for the General Secretariat
- Alexander Zolotarev, state controller for the General Secretariat
- Yukhym Zvyahilsky, former Prime Minister of Ukraine 1993-1994 and entrepreneur
- Oleksandr Feldman, People's Deputy of Ukraine (2002–present)
- Oleksii Reznikov, 17th Minister of Defence (2021-2023)
- Andriy Yermak, former Head of the Office of the President of Ukraine (2020–2025)

== Russian/Soviet politicians ==
- Karl Radek, Soviet politician
- Grigory Sokolnikov, Bolshevik politician
- Abram Slutsky, headed the Soviet foreign intelligence service (INO), then part of the NKVD
- Leon Trotsky, Soviet politician, the founder of the Red Army, commissar (Soviet minister) of Foreign Affairs
- Lazar Kaganovich, Stalinist politician and one of the organizers of the Ukrainian Holodomor and Stalinist Great Purge
- Moisei Uritsky, Soviet politician, chekist
- Grigory Yavlinsky, Russian politician, head of a liberal "Yabloko" party (half Jewish)
- Grigory Zinoviev, Soviet politician
- Lev Mekhlis - Soviet politician and a prominent officer in the Red Army from 1937 to 1942
- V. Volodarsky - Marxist revolutionary and Soviet politician

== Israeli politicians ==
- Yitzhak Ben-Zvi, second President of Israel (1952–63)
- Bezalel Smotrich, Israeli Minister of Finance
- Shmuel Dayan, Zionist activist, Israeli politician
- Levi Eshkol, Israeli Prime Minister (1963–69)
- Ephraim Katzir, fourth President of Israel (1973–78)
- Golda Meir, Israeli Prime Minister (1969–74)
- Natan Sharansky, Israeli politician
- Moshe Sharett, Israeli Prime Minister (1954–55)

== United States politicians ==
- Kirill Reznik, US Politician, Member, Maryland House of Delegates (2007–Present)

== Israeli military persons ==
- Yaakov Dori, first Chief of Staff of the Israel Defense Forces (IDF) (1948–1949); President of Technion.
- Tzvi Tzur, sixth Chief of Staff of the Israel Defense Forces (1961–1964)

== Soldiers and revolutionaries ==
- Pavel Axelrod, Menshevik, Marxist revolutionary
- Yakov Blumkin, Soviet spy
- Naftali Botwin, revolutionary terrorist
- Morris Childs (born Moishe Chilovsky), American communist and spy
- Leo Deutsch, revolutionary
- Raya Dunayevskaya, founder of Marxist humanism in the U.S.
- Israel Fisanovich, World War II submarine commander and Hero of the Soviet Union
- Grigory Goldenberg, revolutionary
- Ze'ev Jabotinsky, founder of British Jewish Legion
- Jacob Golos, Soviet spy
- Olga Kameneva, Russian Bolshevik revolutionary and a Soviet politician (sister of Leon Trotsky)
- Walter Krivitsky (born Samuel Ginsberg), Soviet spy
- Alexander Parvus, revolutionary, major investor and financial supporter of the October Revolution
- Sidney Reilly (born Shlomo Rosenblum), a Ukrainian-born adventurer and Secret Intelligence Service agent
- Pinhas Rutenberg, Zionist, Social revolutionary
- Grigori Shtern (Grigory Stern), Red Army commander (Colonel General)
- Naum Sorkin, Red Army military intelligence chief in the Far East (Major-General)
- V. Volodarsky (born Moisei Goldstein), communist revolutionary
- Mark Zborowski, Soviet spy
- Iona Yakir, Red Army commander and one of the world's major military reformers between World War I and World War II
- Mishka Yaponchik, gangster, leader of the Odesa Jewish Resistance group in 1917-1921

== Other historical figures ==
- Michael Dorfman, Russian-Israeli essayist and human rights activist
- Yisroel ben Eliezer (The Baal Shem Tov), Rabbi, founder of Hasidic Judaism
- Shlomo Ganzfried, Rabbi
- Fanny Kaplan, would-be assassin of Lenin
- Menachem Mendel Schneerson, Rebbe of the Chabad-Lubavitch branch of Hasidic Judaism
- Isroel Shmulson, architect
- Simon Wiesenthal, Holocaust survivor, Nazi hunter, writer
- Semion Mogilevich, "boss of all bosses" of the worldwide Russian Mafia, former member of the FBI Ten Most Wanted Fugitives

== Business figures ==
- Jan Koum, co-founder of WhatsApp
- Leon Bagrit, pioneer of automation
- Zino Davidoff
- Bernard Delfont, impresario
- Lew Grade, founder of ATV
- Ihor Kolomoyskyi, a major Ukrainian business oligarch
- Max Levchin, co-founder of PayPal
- Hryhoriy Surkis, head of public organization Football Federation of Ukraine, Ukrainian parliamentary
- Viktor Vekselberg, billionaire, steelmaker
- Gennadiy Korban, Ukrainian businessman, Member of the Board of Trustees of the Jewish community of Dnipro, Patron of the Jewish community of Kryvyi Rih
- Boris Lohzkin, President of the Jewish Confederation of Ukraine
- Michael Kogan, entrepreneur, founder of Taito

== Natural scientists ==
- Aleksander Akhiezer, physicist
- Matvei Petrovich Bronstein
- Mikhail Gurevich
- Waldemar Haffkine, biologist, developed vaccine against cholera and plague
- Boris Hessen, physicist
- Abram Ioffe, nuclear scientist
- Isaak Markovich Khalatnikov
- Veniamin Levich, electrochemist
- Boris Podolsky
- Isaak Pomeranchuk
- Jacob Rabinow
- Anatol Rapoport
- Grigory Shajn
- Iosif Shklovsky
- Vladimir Veksler
- Alexander Vilenkin, cosmologist
- Selman Waksman, biochemist, Nobel Prize (1952)

== Mathematicians ==
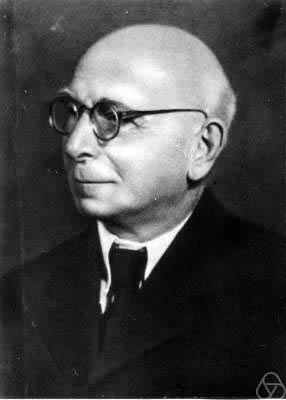
- Sergey Bernstein, a mathematician
  Naum Akhiezer
- Vladimir Arnold
- Sergey Bernstein
- Chudnovsky brothers
- Vladimir Drinfeld
- Felix Gantmacher
- Israel Gelfand
- Alexander Goncharov
- Marc Kac
- Naum Krasner
- Mark Krasnoselsky
- Mark Krein
- Evgenii Landis
- Boris Levin
- Leonid Levin
- Boris Levitan
- Jacob Levitzki
- David Milman
- Pierre Milman
- Vitali Milman
- Mark Naimark
- Moses Schönfinkel
- Samuil Shatunovsky
- Pavel Urysohn
- Oscar Zariski

== Social scientists ==
- Solomon Buber, Hebraist
- Ariel Durant, historian,
- Boris Eichenbaum, historian
- Mikhail Epstein, literary theorist
- Moshe Feldenkrais, inventor of the Feldenkrais method
- Alexander Gerschenkron, economic historian
- Jean Gottmann, geographer
- Zellig Harris
- Jacob Marschak, economist
- Elye Spivak

== Musicians ==
- Sophia Agranovich, pianist
- Simon Barere, pianist
- Sidor Belarsky, operatic basso and music educator
- Felix Blumenfeld, pianist
- Shura Cherkassky, pianist
- Michael Ben David, singer
- Isaak Dunayevsky, composer
- Mischa Elman, violinist
- Anthony Fedorov, singer, American Idol finalist
- Samuil Feinberg, composer
- Emil Gilels, pianist
- Maria Grinberg, pianist
- Eden Golan, singer
- Mordechai Hershman, cantor and singer
- Jascha Horenstein, conductor
- Vladimir Horowitz, pianist
- Leonid Kogan, violinist
- Mikhail Kopelman, violinist
- Oleg Maisenberg, pianist
- Samuel Maykapar, composer/pianist
- Nathan Milstein, violinist
- Benno Moiseiwitsch, pianist
- David Oistrakh, violinist
- Igor Oistrakh, violinist
- Leo Ornstein, composer
- Gregor Piatigorsky, cellist
- Pokrass brothers, composers
- Mark Reizen, operatic bass
- Yossele Rosenblatt, cantor and composer
- Heinrich Schenker, music theorist
- Joseph Schillinger, composer, music theorist, and composition teacher
- Leo Sirota, pianist
- Isaac Stern, violinist
- Roman Turovsky-Savchuk, lutenist-composer
- Lyubov Uspenskaya, singer
- DJ Vlad, DJ, producer, interviewer, journalist, and YouTuber
- Yakov Zak, pianist

== Fine artists ==
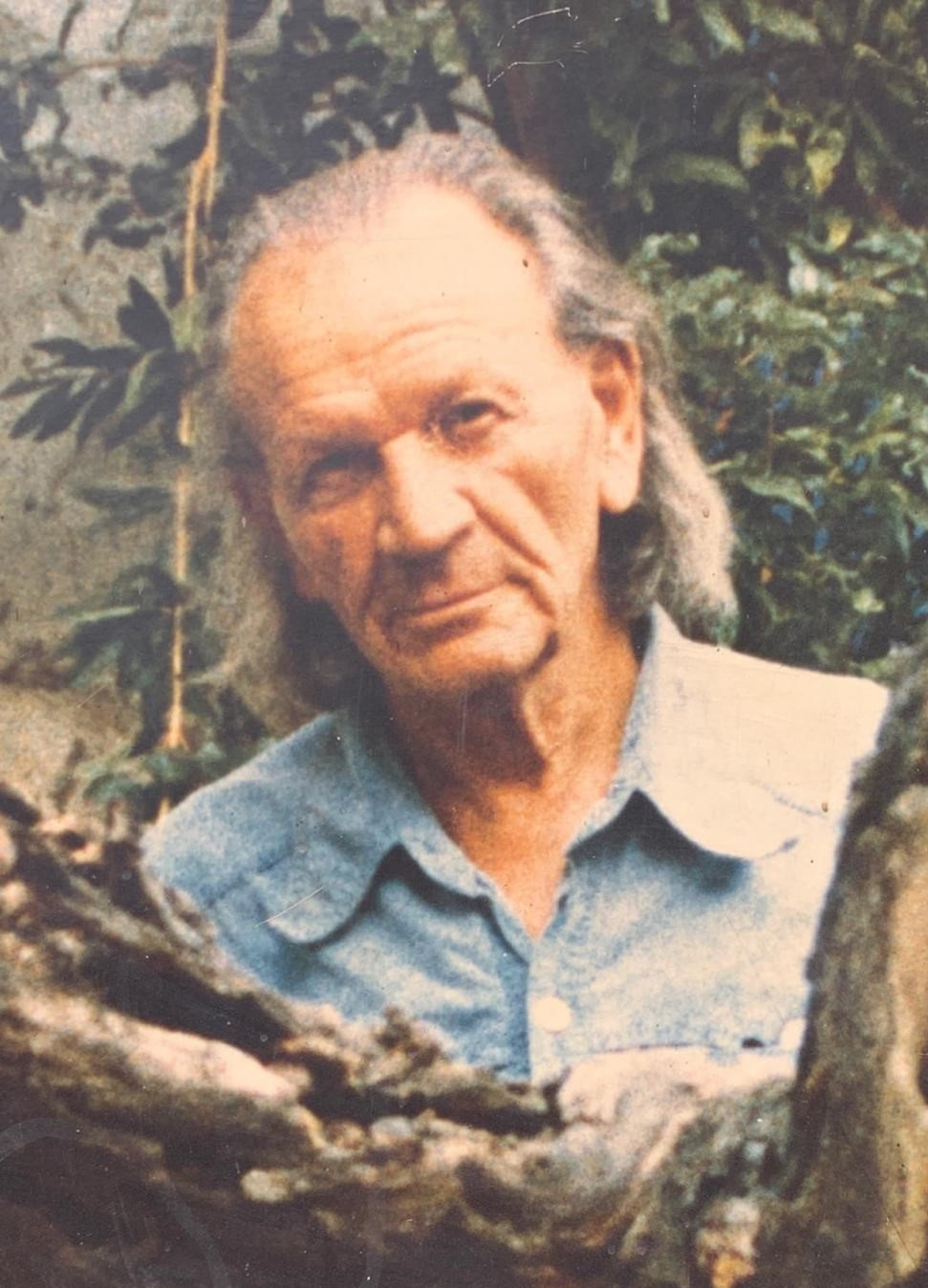
- Yitzhak Frenkel, a major Ecole de Paris painter.
  Michael Matusevitch (1929–2007), painter
- Nathan Altman, painter and stage designer
- Boris Aronson, painter and designer
- Nudie Cohn, fashion designer
- Sonia Delaunay, painter
- Maya Deren, filmmaker
- Boris Efimov, cartoonist
- Yitzhak Frenkel, (1899-1981) School of Paris painter and sculptor.
- Naum Gabo, sculptor
- Boris Iofan, architect
- Ilya Kabakov, conceptualist artist
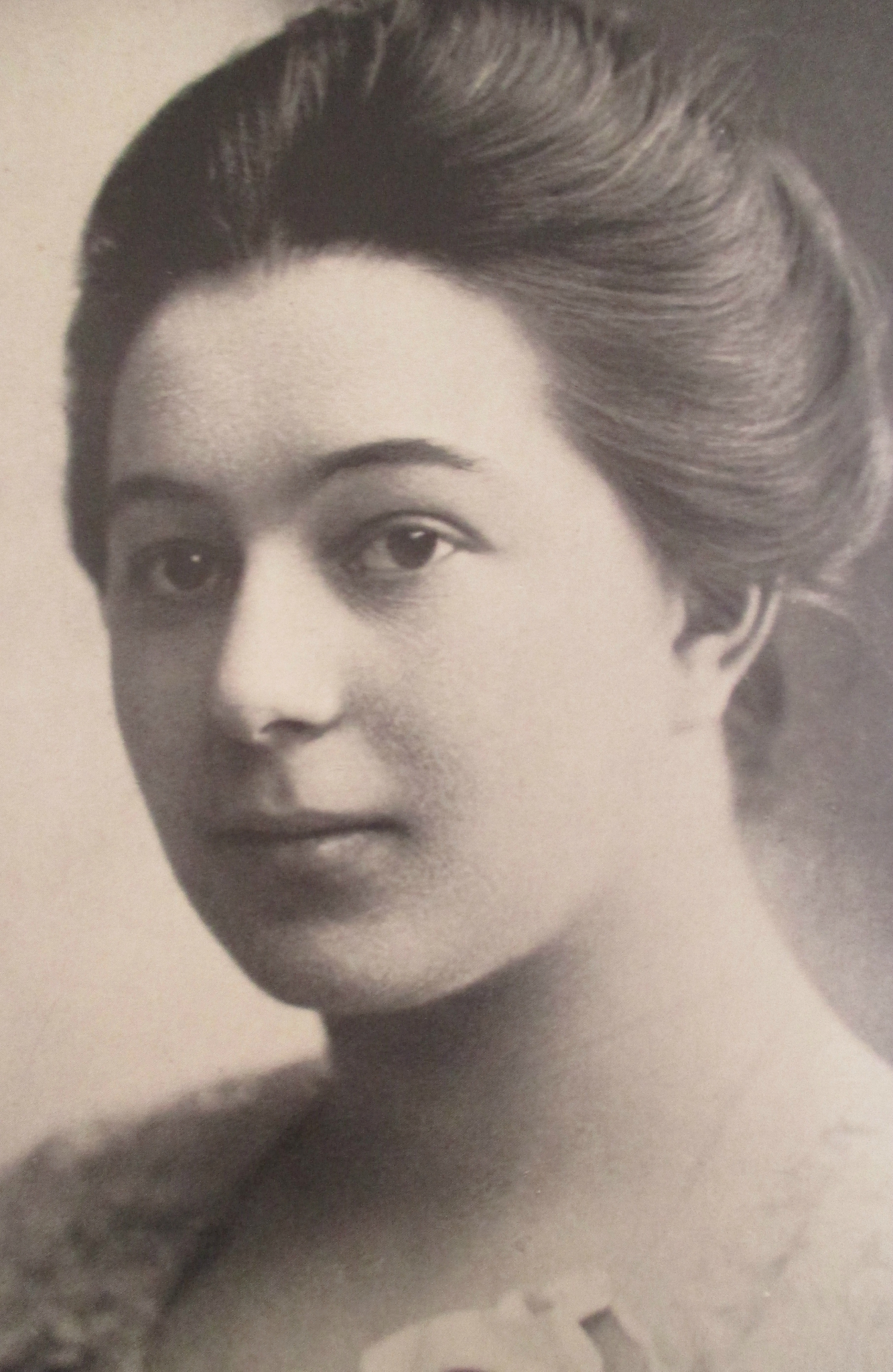
- Sonia Delaunay, co-founder of the Orphism movement.
  Yevgeny Khaldei, photographer
- Jacob Kramer, painter
- Morris Lapidus, architect
- Louise Nevelson, sculptor
- Abraham Mintchine, painter
- Solomon Nikritin
- Jules Olitski, painter
- Leonid Pasternak, painter
- Antoine Pevsner, sculptor
- Olga Rapay-Markish (1929–2012), ceramicist
- Mikhail Turovsky, painter
- Roman Turovsky, painter

== Performing artists ==
- Jacob Adler, actor
- Yosl Cutler, puppeteer
- Steven Spielberg, director
- Abraham Goldfaden (1840–1908), playwright and theatre director
- Alexander Granach (1890–1945), actor in theater and film (Berlin & Germany, Poland, USSR, Hollywood and Broadway)
- Aleksei Kapler, film artist
- Mila Kunis, actress
- Mark Donskoy, Soviet film director
- Anatole Litvak, director
- Alla Nazimova, actress
- Otto Preminger, director, producer, actor
- Ingo Preminger, producer, literary agent
- Elena Ralph, model
- Yakov Smirnoff, American comedian
- Volodymyr Zelenskyy, Ukrainian screenwriter, actor, comedian, and director, who was elected the President of Ukraine in the 2019 Ukrainian presidential election.

== Writers and poets ==
- Sholom Aleichem, Yiddish-language writer
- Eli Schechtman, Yiddish writer
- Isaac Babel, writer
- Eduard Bagritsky, poet
- Hayyim Nahman Bialik, poet
- Yosef Haim Brenner, Hebrew-language writer
- Sasha Cherny, poet
- Michael Dorfman, journalist and essayist
- Moysey Fishbein, poet
- Ilya Ehrenburg, writer
- Alexander Galich, playwright poet
- Asher Hirsch Ginsberg (Ahad Ha'Am), Hebrew-language writer
- Lydia Ginzburg, writer
- Jacob Gordin, American playwright
- Erol Güney, journalist and translator
- Vasily Grossman, writer
- Ilya Ilf, writer
- Vera Inber, poet
- Alejandro Jodorowsky, Spanish-language writer and filmmaker
- A.M. Klein, poet
- Pavel Kogan, poet
- Lev Kopelev, author and dissident
- Clarice Lispector, writer from Brazil
- Benedikt Livshits, writer
- Nadezhda Mandelstam, writer
- Yunna Morits, poet
- Charles Neider, writer, editor, Antarctic explorer
- Anatoli Rybakov, writer
- Boris Slutsky, war-time poet
- Shaul Tchernichovsky, poet and translator

== Chess players ==
- Alexander Beliavsky
- Ossip Bernstein
- Isaac Boleslavsky
- David Bronstein, World Championship challenger
- Iossif Dorfman
- Louis Eisenberg
- Alexander Evensohn
- Efim Geller
- Eduard Gufeld
- Ilya Gurevich
- Mikhail Gurevich
- Nicolai Jasnogrodsky
- Gregory Kaidanov
- Alexander Konstantinopolsky
- Konstantin Lerner
- Moishe Lowtzky
- Vladimir Malaniuk
- Sam Palatnik
- Ernest Pogosyants
- Iosif Pogrebyssky
- Leonid Stein
- Mark Taimanov
- Boris Verlinsky
- Yakov Vilner
- Anna Ushenina

== See also ==
- History of the Jews in Ukraine
- List of Galician Jews
- List of Jews born in the former Russian Empire
