= Isaak Russman =

Russian mathematician and economist (1938–2005)

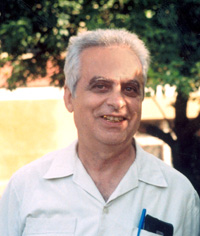
- Born: March 7, 1938; Voronezh, Russia
- Died: June 11, 2005 (aged 67); Voronezh, Russia
- Citizenship: Russia
- Known for: Some new concepts in qualimetry and systems analysis.
- Scientific career
- Fields: Mathematician, Economist
- Institutions: Voronezh State University, Russia
- Doctoral advisor: Selim Krein

Isaak Borisovich Russman (Russian: Исаак Борисович Руссман; 7 March 1938 – 11 July 2005) was a Russian mathematician and economist. He studied and worked at Voronezh State University.

Isaak Borisovich Russman was born on March 7, 1938, in Voronezh. Although his childhood dream was studying astronomy, in 1955 he entered Voronezh State University where he studied in the Physics and Mathematics department. Starting in 1969 and until the end of his life, Russman conducted research in operations research at the same institution where he had studied.

Russman taught discrete mathematics, the theory of algorithms and mathematical logic, probability theory, economic cybernetics, and systems analysis.

Russman conducted research on topics related to simulation-targeted systems (economic, social, institutional), quality assessment, and building valuation models. He is famous for creating the concept "difficulty in achieving the objectives", a concept which is used to assess the value of a certain specified requirement. This approach was usefully applied to models of control and management of organizational systems and portfolio optimization models.
