= David Aizman =

Russian-Jewish novelist and playwright

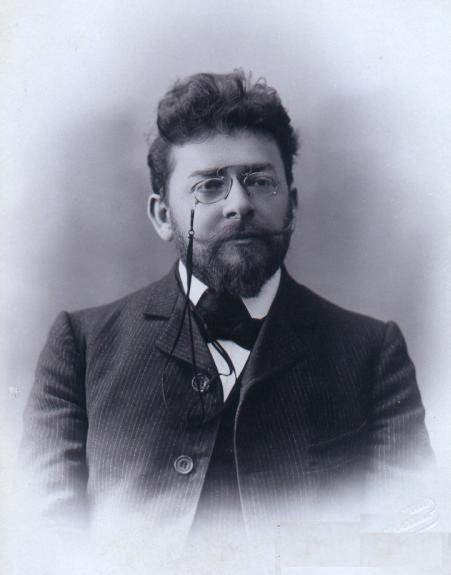
- Born: 26 March 1869; Nikolayev, Kherson Governorate, Russian Empire (now Ukraine)
- Died: 26 September 1922 (aged 53); Detskoye Selo, Soviet Union

David Yakovlevich Aizman (Russian: Дави́д Я́ковлевич А́йзман; 26 March 1869 – 26 September 1922) was a Russian-Jewish novelist and playwright.

== Biography ==
David Aizman was born in Nikolayev, a coastal city in what is now Ukraine. His older brothers were revolutionary activists. By the time he was 15, he was already earning his living as a private tutor. He lived in Odessa and worked for the Odessa Papers when he was 20. In 1896, he relocated to Paris to study painting. Two years later, he and his wife, a Russian-Jewish physician, moved to the French countryside. While living in France, he made his debut in the magazine Russian Wealth. Two of his most original works, In a Foreign Land (1902) and The Countrymen (1903), were written and set in France.

He returned to Russia in 1902. During the 1900s and 1910s his stories and novellas appeared in leading periodicals, and his plays were staged in major theatres. His works were published by Maxim Gorky's Znanie company among others. His open portrayal of Russian and Ukrainian anti-semitism made his fiction unpublishable in the Soviet Union, and his reputation and popularity suffered a serious decline. His critics included David Bergelson, who stated that Aizman was one of those who proclaimed their interest in Yiddish but were living in an alien culture.

== English translations ==
- The Countrymen, from An Anthology of Jewish-Russian Literature: 1801–1953, Maxim Shrayer, M.E. Sharpe, 2007.
