= Josephine Yaroshevich =

Ukrainian painter (born 1946)

- Жозефина Ярошевич
- Born: 1946 (age 79–80); Kharkiv, USSR
- Occupation: Artist

Josephine Yaroshevich (Russian: Жозефина Ярошевич; born 1946) is a Ukrainian painter who works with computer art.

== Biography ==
Josephine Yaroshevich was born in Kharkiv to a Jewish family, and grew up in Odesa. She studied art at Odesa with well-known painters Lev Mejberg and Zoy Ivnitzkaia. She also studied at the Moscow Art Academy under the guidance of professor Volia Nikolatvich Liahov. She taught at the Stroganoff Academy and Polygraphists Institute, and worked at the famous Taganka Theater, both in Moscow. There, she was associated with Nonconformists Group. The origins of her art stem from the Russian avant-garde; Kandinsky, Malevich, El Lissitzky and Scriabin influenced her spiritual and aesthetic development.

She has resided in Jerusalem since 1973. Here, she taught at the Bezalel Academy of Arts and Design, and worked at the Israel Museum, the Rockefeller Museum and the Hebrew University.

She has worked with computers since 1975; when she began working at the Art and Science Department at the Bezalel Academy in Jerusalem with Vladimir Bonachech. Then, for the first time, a huge colored digital board, connected to a computer, was exhibited at the National Museum in Jerusalem. Yaroshevich exhibits all over the world: in Israel, the United States, Canada, Russia, England, France, Germany, Japan and China. Her works are in museums in Jersey City, Haifa and Montgeron, as well as in the collections of Senator Henry Jackson, Dan Hamilton, famous collector Alexander Glaser and many others. In 2010, "Music in Color" was presented at the Museum of Contemporary Art in Shanghai and the Israel Museum in Jerusalem.

== List of J. Yaroshevich Solo exhibitions ==
- 2010, February - "Music in Color". Israel Museum. Jerusalem, Israel
- 2007 - September–October - Art House of Quality, Jerusalem, Israel
- 2006, December - Gallery of the Palace of the Nations, Jerusalem, Israel
- 2006 - June - Back Center, Hi-Tech Cultural Center. Jerusalem, Israel
- 2002 – Shonka Gallery. Jerusalem, Israel
- 2000 – University Gallery. Beit Belgia. Jerusalem, Israel
- 1999 – Interamerican House. Jerusalem, Israel
- 1997 – City Gallery. Odesa, Ukraine
- 1995 – Intellectuals club. Kyiv, Ukraine
- 1992 – Srudborove. Warsaw. Poland
- 1987 – Azorean Gallery. Emek Israel, Israel
- 1979 – Hutzot ha Yozer, Jerusalem, Israel
- 1974 – Genia Gallery, Tel-Aviv, Israel

== List of J. Yaroshevich Group exhibitions ==
- 2009.12 - 2010.1 - МОМА (Museum of Modern Art) Animamix, Shanghai, China
- 2008, June, July – Jubilee 60 year Israel, 40 Year United Jerusalem. Israel
- 2005 - Quanyin – Goddess of Mercy & Compassion. Toronto, Ontario. Canada
- 2005 - Zwischen himmel und erde. Spaltenstein. Germany
- 2004 - C.A.S.E. Museum of Russian Art in Exile, Jersey City, New Jersey, USA
- 1996 – Lit museum. Odesa, Ukraine
- 1989 – Rockefeller Museum. Studio. Jerusalem, Israel
- 1986 – Christian feast, Palace of the Nations, Jerusalem, Israel
- 1983 - Grosvenor Gallery, London, England
- 1982-83 - C.A.S.E. Museum of Russian Art in Exile, Jersey City, New Jersey
- 1978 - Museum of Contemporary Russian Art, Montgeron, France
- 1977- In favor of the children of the soviet political prisoners. Parkway Focus Gallery, London, England; Museum of Contemporary Russian Art, Montgeron, Paris, France. Munich, Germany
- 1976 -Russian Nonconformist Artists. Saulgau, Germany
- 1975 – Rothschild center Haifa, Israel
- 1975 –The Newcomers, WIZO, Jerusalem, Israel
- 1974 – The Young Israel, Old Jaffa, Israel
- 1974 - Sderot Hen, Independence, Tel-Aviv, Israel

== Literature ==
- Daniel Fuch. We moeten open zijn naar de anderen, de nien-joden toe". Christians for Israel 4.6.1986. Holland.
- Григорий Островский «Свет далёких эвезд». 11.7.2004. «Вести», (раздел культуры). Израиль.(in Russian)
- М. Гамбурд, «Потусторонние города». 2000. Окна. (Новости Недели).(in Russian)
- הציירת שרצתה להיות בתוך עמו".דבורה — «למתחיל» 16 בספטמבר 1974" ישראל.
