= Valentin Zorin =

Russian political commentator

- Валенти́н Серге́евич Зо́рин
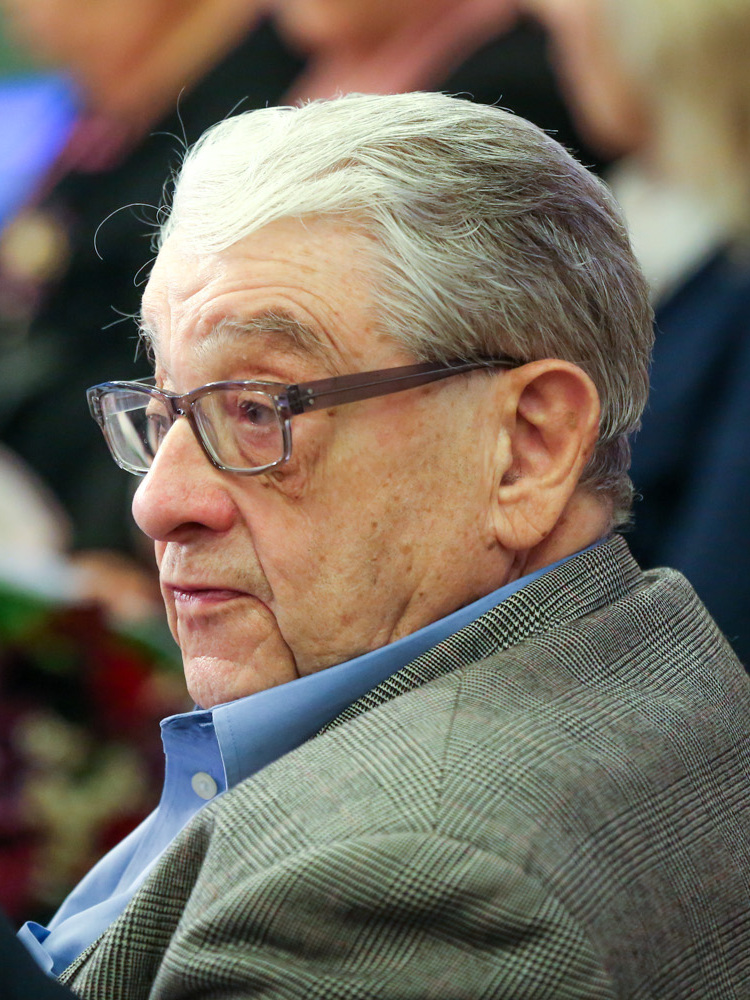
- 29 October 2014
- Born: February 9, 1925; Moscow, RSFSR, USSR
- Died: April 27, 2016 (aged 91); Moscow, Russia
- Citizenship: Soviet, Russian
- Education: Doctor of Sciences
- Alma mater: Moscow Institute of International Relations
- Occupations: political commentator, journalist, radio personality, screenwriter, television presenter, author, historian
- Spouse: Kira Sokolova (b. 1928)
- Children: Ekaterina Zorina (b. 1954)
- Writing career
- Language: Russian
- Years active: 1948–2016
- Subjects: International events, politics, American society
- Notable works: How it looks from Moscow, America the Seventies
- Notable awards: USSR State Prize, Vasilyev Brothers State Prize of the RSFSR, Honored Cultural Worker of the RSFSR, numerous others

Valentin Sergeyevich Zorin (Russian: Валентин Сергеевич Зорин; February 9, 1925, Moscow – April 27, 2016, Moscow) was a Soviet and Russian political commentator, journalist, author, screenwriter and television presenter.

== Career ==
Zorin was host of several Soviet television programs that discussed international events and politics. Considered an Americanist, Zorin lived most of his working years in the United States. During his career, he was able to secure exclusive interviews with key world leaders, including Henry Kissinger, John F. Kennedy, Charles de Gaulle, and Margaret Thatcher.

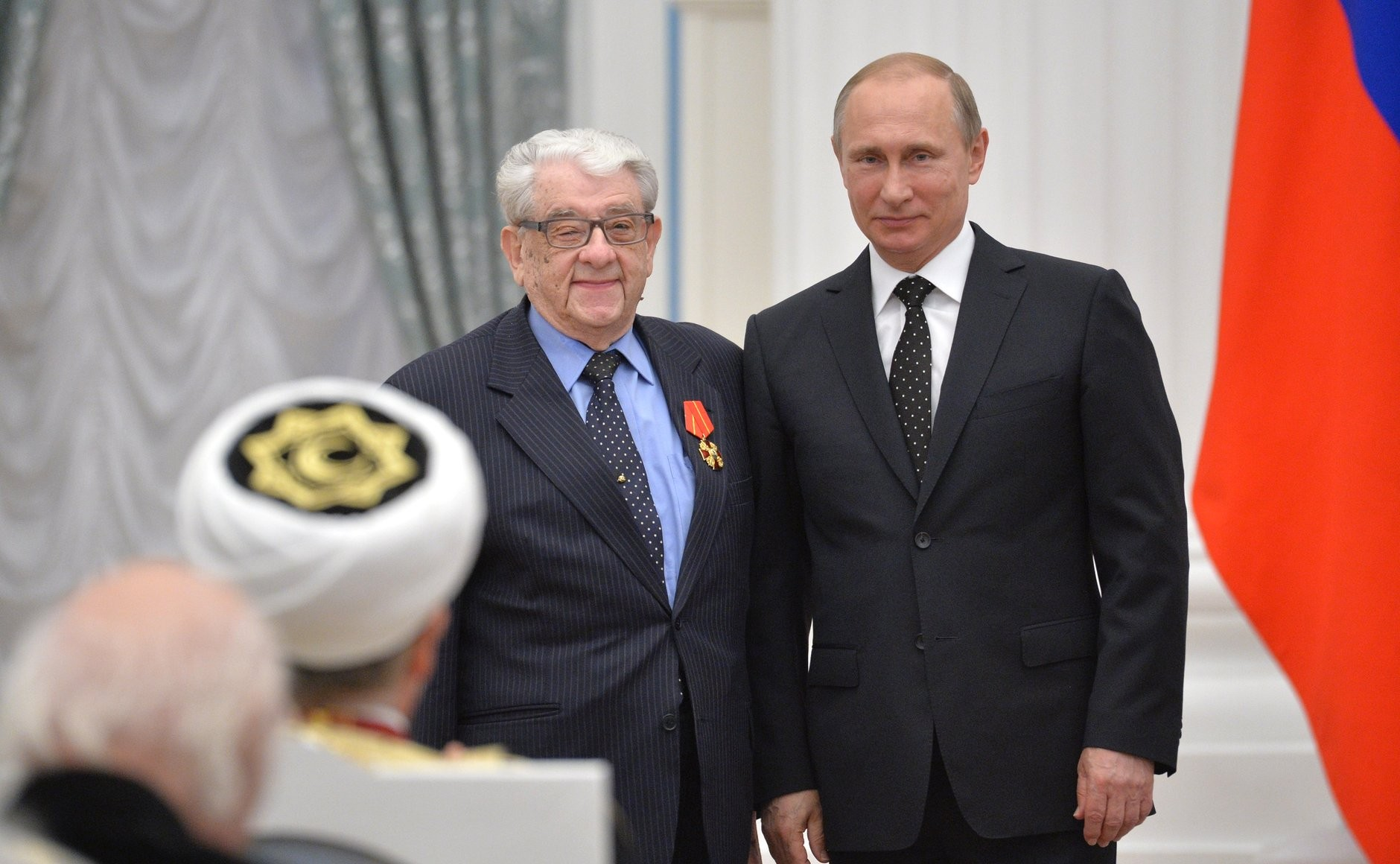
Photograph of Valentin Zorin receiving the Order of Alexander Nevsky from Vladimir Putin in 2015.

In his latter years, he was a columnist for RIA Novosti and hosted a program on Voice of Russia called "How it looks from Moscow." For his work in the media, he received awards including Honoured Cultural Worker of the RSFSR (1973), Vasilyev Brothers State Prize of the RSFSR (1982) and the USSR State Prize in 1976.
