= Lidiya Ginzburg =

Soviet literary critic (1902–1990)

- Born: March 18, 1902; Odessa, Russian Empire (now Ukraine)
- Died: July 17, 1990 (aged 88); Leningrad, Soviet Union
- Occupations: Writer, literary critic

Lidiya Yakovlevna Ginzburg (Russian: Ли́дия Я́ковлевна Ги́нзбург; March 18, 1902, Odessa, Russian Empire – July 17, 1990, Leningrad, USSR) was a Soviet literary critic, historian, writer of the Russian Formalist school, and survivor of the siege of Leningrad. She is best known among English-reading audiences for her Blockade Diary (alternatively Diary of a Blockade Person), written during and after the Siege of Leningrad. Ginzburg died at the age of 88 from a heart attack proceeded by a stroke. She is buried in a cemetery in Komarovo.

== Early life ==
=== Family ===
Ginzburg was born to a wealthy, secularized Jewish merchant family in Odessa, modern-day Ukraine. The Ginzburg family owned two homes in Odessa, of which they rented out parts. During the summertime, the Ginzburgs rented out dachas where they hosted scholars living and working in Leningrad. Ginzburg's father, Yakov Ginzburg, died in 1909 at the age of 45 from a heart attack, and Ginzburg's mother died of starvation in 1942 during the Siege of Leningrad.

=== Childhood and adolescence ===
Ginzburg was well-educated and could read Russian, German, French, and later, English. Ginzburg enjoyed sailing, playing tennis, and swimming, and also participated in a theatrical troupe and a scout club. Ginzburg identified as an atheist from age 17 onward.

== St. Petersburg ==
Ginzburg had always dreamed of living in St. Petersburg (at the time called Petrograd), and on July 18, 1920, at the age of 18, moved there and began studying chemistry. During this time, she also began experimenting with poetry, but was rejected from various literary circles. After being rejected from Petrograd State University (the same as Leningrad State University and St. Petersburg University), Ginzburg moved back to Odessa in the summer of 1921. In the fall of 1922, Ginzburg was admitted to the Institute for the History of the Arts, and once again relocated to Petrograd. From the early 1930s until 1970, Ginzburg lived in a communal apartment in central Leningrad. In 1970 Ginzburg moved into a private, one-room apartment on the outskirts of Leningrad, where she spent the remainder of her life.

=== Stalinism ===
Ginzburg survived the Great Terror of the 1930s; however, many of her literary friends did not. She was arrested and imprisoned for two weeks in 1933 because of her friendship with Viktor Zhirmunsky, who was under investigation at the time. Ginzburg also survived the antisemitic anti-cosmopolitan campaign of the late 1940s and early 1950s. In 1952, she was questioned about Boris Eikhenbaum, under whom she had studied at the Leningrad State University in the late 1920s, but was not arrested thanks to Joseph Stalin's death in the spring of 1953 which ended the campaign.

=== Siege of Leningrad ===
Ginzburg survived the Siege of Leningrad (1941-44) by working as a salaried editor at the Leningrad Radio Committee from 1942 until the end of the war in 1945. Her experience during the war formed the basis for Notes of a Blockade Person.

== Career ==
Although Ginzburg would go on to earn her income through her literary scholarship, it wasn't until the spring of 1923, when her first seminar presentation was acclaimed by Yuri Tynianov, that she devoted herself to a career in literature. During her time at the Institute for the History of the Arts, Ginzburg joined the Young Formalists in 1924 and published her first article in 1926. Also in 1926, Ginzburg graduated from the Institute, where she was hired as a teaching assistant and granted a research fellowship. At this point in her career, Ginzburg, researched, wrote about, and lectured on 19th and 20th century Russian poetry. During this time, Ginzburg was initiated into the literary circles of Leningrad, becoming friends with contemporary Russian writers and poets.

After being demoted from her position as a full-time graduate student at the Leningrad State University for her "insufficient use of Marxist methods" in 1928 and the shutdown of the Institute in 1930, Ginzburg worked at Detgiz, where she published The Pinkerton Agency in 1933.

In 1935 Ginzburg joined the Union of Soviet Writers. From 1930 until 1950 Ginzburg took on extra lecturing jobs in order to earn more money. She was unable to get a job at the universities because she had been part of the Young Formalists and was Jewish. In 1947 Ginzburg was hired by Eleazar Meletinsky as an associate professor at the Petrozavodsk State University, where she worked for the next three years. In 1957 Ginzburg was at last allowed to publish her doctoral dissertation, which was on My Past and Thoughts by Alexander Herzen. In 1964 Ginzburg's book On the Lyric was published, which solidified her reputation as an important literary scholar. In 1984 Neva published Ginzburg's Notes of a Blockade Person, which was widely read. In 1988 Ginzburg received the State Prize in Literature and the Arts.

== Literary style ==
Ginzburg was first and foremost a literary scholar, and wrote prose "for the desk drawer." In her prose, Ginzburg was interested in representing everyday Soviet life in anti-romantic terms. In her early work, she experimented with different writing styles, and created a genre-blending "in-between literature": a combination of observations, thoughts, and prose on various topics.

== Personal life ==
Ginzburg was a lesbian. Ginzburg enjoyed doing photography. Throughout her entire adult life, Ginzburg was acquaintances and friends with many influential Soviet writers, poets, and scholars including Anna Akhmatova, Osip Mandelstam, Osip Brik, Vladimir Mayakovsky, Nikolai Zabolotsky, Nadezhda Mandelstam, Varlam Shalamov, Eduard Bagritsky, Nikolai Khardzhiev, Marietta Chudakov, Iurii Lotman, and Alexander Kushner, and many more.

== Writings (incomplete) ==
=== Published works ===
- The Pinkerton Agency (Agentstvo Pinkertona) (1933)
- On the Lyric (O lirike) (1964)
- "About Old Age and Infantilism" ("O starosti i ob infantil'-nosti")
- "On Satire and Analysis" ("O satire i ob analize")
- On Psychological Prose (first edition published 1971; published in English in 1991)
- On the Literary Hero (1979)
- About the Old and the New (O starom i novom) (1982)
- Notes of a Blockade Person (1984; published in English as Blockade Diary in 1995)
- "Generation at a Turning Point" ("Pokolenie na povorote") (1987)
- Literature in Search of Reality (1987)
- "At One with the Legal Order" ("I zaodno s pravoporiandkom") (1988)

=== Archival drafts ===
- "The Return Home" (1929-36)
- "Delusion of the Will" (c. 1934)
- "The Thought that Drew a Circle" (c. 1934-36 or 1939)
- "A Story of Pity and Cruelty" (c, 1942-44)
- "Otter's Day" (c. 1943-45)
