= Alexander Tropsha =

American chemist

- Education: Moscow State University
- Scientific career
- Fields: Chemistry, QSAR, Drug Discovery
- Workplaces: University of North Carolina - Chapel Hill

Alexander Tropsha is a chemist and professor at the University of North Carolina - Chapel Hill. Tropsha is Associate Dean for Pharmacoinformatics and Data Science at the UNC Eshelman School of Pharmacy. His primary fields of research are cheminformatics and quantitative structure-activity relationship (QSAR) modeling in the context of drug discovery. As of 2015, Tropsha has been an associate editor of the American Chemical Society’s Journal of Chemical Information and Modeling.

== Background ==
In 1982, Tropsha earned his master's degree chemistry from Moscow State University. Tropsha continued his studies under Lev S. Yaguzhinski earning his PhD in biochemistry and pharmacology in 1986.

Tropsha immigrated to the United States in 1989 where he began his career in academics as an assistant professor and director of the Laboratory for Molecular Modeling at the University of North Carolina - Chapel Hill in 1991. Tropsha became a professor in 2004, and, in 2008, he became the K.H. Lee Distinguished Professor at the UNC Eshelman School of Pharmacy.

== Research ==
Research in his laboratory includes the development and application of k-nearest neighbor pattern recognition methods to the field of QSARs and application of the Delaunay tessellation technique to protein structure analysis. His recent work focuses on methods of rigorous validation of QSAR models and the development of best-practice QSAR workflows. Tropsha's group has also raised concerns over the utility of structural alerts in toxicology and for PAINS.
