= Lev Shekhtman =

American actor

- Лев Шехтман
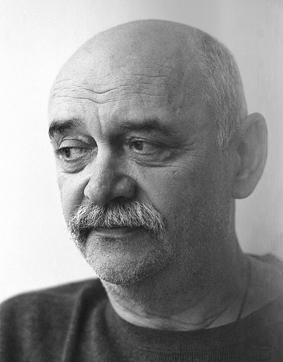
- Born: March 10, 1951 (age 75); Chernivtsi, Ukrainian SSR, Soviet Union (now Ukraine)
- Occupations: Actor, theatre director
- Years active: 1979–present

Lev Shulimovich Shekhtman (Note: Russian: Лев Шулимович Шехтман, romanized: Lev Shulimovich Shekhtman; Ukrainian: Лев Шулімович Шехтман, romanized: Lev Shulimovych Shekhtman) (born March 10, 1951) is an American theatre director and actor.

== Life and career ==
Shekhtman received his earliest theatrical education at the local children's theater in his native city of Chernivtsi (Ukraine), under the supervision of the Merited Artist of Ukraine V. V. Bespoletova (В.В. Бесполётова). In 1969, he enrolled in a directing/acting class at the St. Petersburg State Academy for Theatre Arts (then Leningrad State Institute of Theater, Music and Cinematography), in the class of Professor A. A. Muzil (А.А. Музиль). Upon graduation, he spent three years working as a Master level Director at Vologda State Drama Theater.

In 1978, he immigrated to the United States. His American directorial debut came in July 1979 with Nikolai Gogol's "Marriage" (Н.Гоголь «Женитьба») at the Lexington Conservatory Theatre (Lexington, New York), starring Michael J. Hume, Susan Smyth, Patricia Charbonneau and Lynne Charnay. It was praised for "inspired performances" and "brilliant direction" by Shekhtman. The same year he began teaching acting and directing at Sonya Moore’s Stanislavski Studio of the Theatre in New York City. His New York directorial debut was a 1980 Playwrights Horizons production of "Heat of Re-Entry" by Abraham Tetenbaum. The same year, Shekhtman and his former students opened Theater in Action, based in Manhattan, which he ran and managed up until 1990. The theater contained two spaces. One functioned as a main stage, and the other as a theater school, where Shekhtman taught acting and directing. The company’s repertoire included works by Anton Chekhov, Tennessee Williams, Albert Camus, Jack London, Nikolai Gogol, Berthold Brecht, modern American playwright Michael McGuire, and Russian playwright Grigory Gorin. His Western Hemisphere premier of Gorin’s "The House That Swift Built" opened with the presence of the author in 1986.

Shekhtman in the course of his career also collaborated with several famous theater companies (Manhattan Theater Club, The Public Theater, The American Place Theater and McArthur Theater in Princeton, NJ).

Starting in 1986, and for the following seven years L. Shekhtman worked as an actor in various films produced by the Polish film and television director and Oscar winner Zbigniew Rybczyński. Among them was the 1990 Emmy award winning television film "Orchestra", in which Lev plays one of the main roles. He also played the leading role in Jennifer Montgomery’s film "Troika" in the role of the Russian politician Vladimir Zhirinovsky. His other film appearances include: the role of Vladimir in "Indocumentados", and KGB-1 in the film "The Life Experience". He was also featured in the Russian TV show "Citizen Boss-2." («Гражданин начальник-2»)

From 1995 to 2000, Shekhtman worked as a news writer and host for several Russian-language television and radio programs.

In 2006, he made his debut at St. Petersburg State Molodyozhny Theatre on Fontanka (Russia) directing "Blue Roses”, («Синие розы») based on by Tennessee Williams's “The Glass Menagerie”. In 2008, at the same theatre he directed and adapted for stage a novel “Job” («Иов») by the Austrian writer Joseph Roth.

In 2012, Shekhtman staged at The St. Petersburg State Molodyozhny Theatre on Fontanka his third production, his own adaptation based on a cycle of short stories by Sergei Dovlatov, "Ours" («Наши»), entitled "Abanamat!" («АБАНАМАТ!»).

In 2014, Shekhtman staged a production of Jean Anouilh's "Antigone" at the Vladimir Regional Academical Drama Theatre in Vladimir, Russia. In 2017, the theater premiered Eugene O'Neill's "Desire Under the Elms", under Shekhtman's direction.

In 2017, Shekhtman co-founded the Theater of Russian Actors (TRACT) in New York City, along with producer Mikhail Galkin. In 2017, under Shekhtman's direction, the theater showed the world premiere of "Raskolnikov and the Pawnbroker. A Love Story", by Edward Reznik—a satire based on Crime and Punishment by F. Dostoevsky, and in 2018, Equation with Two Variables (Unknowns), after Jean Cocteau and August Strindberg.
