= Benish Mininberg =

Israeli artist (1902–1996)

Benish Mininberg (Hebrew: בןיש מינינברג; 1902–1996) was an Israeli painter.

== Life ==
Benish was one of seven siblings of Yehuda and Leba Mininberg. His parents were members of the First Aliyah, having migrated in 1900 to the small village of Neve Shalom, near the town of Jaffa, then part of Palestine. The Mininberg family resided in the craftsman center of the Neve Shalom village. Benish quit his studies in the Elians primary school before the fourth grade to join his father's house painting business.

The last years of World War I forced the Turkish governor Jamal Facha to evacuate Tel Aviv and Jaffa. In 1917, Mininberg's family was forced to evacuate to a refugee camp set up in a eucalyptus forest in Kfar Saba. The family migrated to Neve Shalom at the end of the war. At the end of the war the family returned to the Neve Shalom, while Benish was sent to study at the Belazelel Academy of Art and Design in Jerusalem. By 1921, Mininberg's father had established his role as a community leader and moved the family to a new house at 22 Shenkin Street. Today, all that remains of the Mininbgerg family house are the ruins of a fishpond.

After a year of study at the art academy, Meninberg moved back to assist in his father's business. In 1926 he married Rozie Shpindler. Together they raised two children, Abraham and uri, in a residence close to his father's house on Shenkin Street.

Benish Mininberg lived until the age of 94 and died in 1996 in Ramat Gan. His inheritance includes hundreds of oil paintings bequeathed to his family members and art collectors.

== Career ==
During the early 20s, as part of his father's family business, Benish began painting decorative wall paintingsin Tel Aviv. Their advertisements in “Hamelacha” magazine in 1922 and 1923 featured the logo “Room paintings by European fashion”.

In their early models, Benish and his father mainly used pictures printed in a book called Ornamentenschatz, published in Stuttgart, Germany, 1883. This book is now owned by Benish's grandson – Eli Mininberg.

Files found in Benish's inheritance testify that in 1925 he performed several special painting jobs in public buildings in Hebron for the British government in Jerusalem. Uri his son says Benish told him he had painted a ceiling painting in the house of a British governor - possibly Charles Clore in the governor's palace (“Armon HaNetziv”) in Jerusalem in 1928.

In 1928 an advertisement for the “Institute for Israeli art of Mininberg & Sons” appeared in “Hanagar” (The carpenter) magazine. The institute's major products were Israeli souvenirs in a “Betzalel” style, made of olive tree, copper strands, embroidery. The souvenirs included motifs such as camels, biblical motifs, shepherds, sheep and Israeli landscape and scenery.

In 1929 the Mininberg's presented their institute's art work at the “Yerid – Hamizrach” (The eastern fair) exhibition and won a silver medal for second place. The institute was housed in a shack in the family's yard at 22nd Shenkin Street in Tel Aviv, and another store was located in “Nachalat Binyamin”. (The shack still exists).

The institute operated for a few years and in the early 1930s there were no more consumers for its products.

Benish made a career change and worked as a furniture decorator and painter, mostly on stylish metal furniture. At first he worked for the “Shlechter et Fridman” company in Tel Aviv in 1934.

During 1935–1937 Benish worked in Jerusalem for “The Aldouby Brothers” – metal furniture manufacturers. He also performed private painting jobs for Arab furniture companies in Jerusalem. In 1938 Benish and his Family moved to Beirut, Lebanon, in order for him to work for a metal furniture company owned by the industrialist Israel Hananya (Hananzon). The company has several branches spread around the Middle East. Benish served as the company's foreman and decorative painter. In those years, the company's wealthy customers would order personal paintings and ornaments painted on wooden and metal rods – a job Benish specialized in.

For a short period of time, Benish went to Syria & Turkey to work for similar furniture companies. According to his Grandson, Elli, he also painted walls and the palace of Kemal Atatürk in Ankara. Some pictures possessed by his son, feature Benish near the Palace in Ankara.

Benish returned to Israel in 1939 and was sent to Egypt as a professional representative of “Tzeva” – today known as “Tambur”.

In 1948, when the Israeli Air Force was established, Benish participated in a competition to choose the design for the Air Force emblem. His design for the emblem, a Star of David combined with a wing was chosen. This was the first emblem for the Air force's beret, which years later was replaced by the current one.

Following the establishment of the state of Israel, he painted and sold his paintings. His son, Abraham, joined him and they moved to Ramat Gan and opened a painting and framing studio. Throughout his life Benish painted in oil on fabric in varied styles and made a living from selling his paintings.

Benish traveled the world and visited his brother, Tzvi, who settled in South Africa. He visited his brother, Abraham, who lived in New York several times – where he participated in a drawing exhibition at the graphic institute of New York in 1958.

The painter and author Ronit Yedaya learned drawing at the age of 15 in Benish's studio in Ramat Gan. In an article published in “Tarbut Maariv” on April 28, 1995 she mentioned her working as his assistant and together with him creating replicas of great artists, such as Picasso, Van – Gouch etc. “We didn’t make forgeries, you could see they were replicas. From him I learned the secrets of drawing”.

Benish was a modest painter who was not famous in Israel, perhaps because he did not belong to any of the painter's organizations and didn't make any effort to become famous. As a part of a family of establishers of the first Aliyah, and of the leaders of the craftsmen center, Benish took part in the development and establishment of the state of Israel and new times of prosperity and hardship.
