= Qualimetry =

Qualimetry is a scientific discipline which concerns itself with the methods and problems of quantification of the quality of any object: things or processes, whether natural or man-made, products of labour or nature, whether living or inanimate, etc.

It is a scientific theory of the quantitative determination of quality developed in the former USSR by G.G.Azgaldov and currently used in development of Russian standards (GOST), etc.

== Discussion ==
"The term qualimetry (from the Latin quale, “of what kind”), which designates a scientific discipline studying the methodology and problems of quantitative assessment of the quality of any kind of object (primarily, products), was first used in 1968. That this initiative was timely and justifiable was borne out by a series of international scholarly conferences fully or partly devoted to issues of qualimetry, e.g., in Moscow, Oslo, Varna, Yerevan, Madrid or Tallinn. The term qualimetry is being gradually admitted into the scientific and engineering vocabularies of many countries. According to Google, tens of thousands of references to publications in 32 languages contain this term. "
