= Ilya Shtemler =

Soviet and Russian writer (1933–2022)

Ilya Petrovich Shtemler (né Izrail Pinkhusovich Shtemler; Russian: Илья Штемлер; 18 January 1933 – 3 December 2022) was a Soviet and Russian writer.

== Biography ==
Shtemler was born in Baku on 18 January 1933. He graduated from the Baku Industrial Institute in 1957, and then worked as an engineer, first in the oil industry in the Volga region and then in the "Geologorazvedka" factory in Leningrad, the city which eventually became his second home. Shtemler's novels Univermag (The Department Store), Poezd (Train), and Utrennee shosse (Morning highway) are assertively realistic description of the life in 1960s, 70s, and 80s Russia. His first novel, The Grandmaster's Mark, was published in 1965 by Yunost and brought immediate recognition to its author. Shtemler was an active campaigner for the protection of Russian historical heritage. In 2006, he became vice -president of the St. Petersburg division of the PEN club.

== Death ==
Shtemler died from COVID-19 in Saint Petersburg on 3 December 2022, at the age of 89.
