= Joseph Tepper =

American painter

Joseph Tepper 1886-1977 was a Russian, Jewish, American portrait painter and artist.

He was born in Mezhirichi, but grew up and was educated in Odessa. In about 1905, he moved to Paris where he got his first formal training as an artist. He returned to Russia about the time of the start of the first World War and was living in Moscow during the Russian Revolution. He left Russia for good in 1921 and moved first to what was then the British Mandate of Palestine, then to Egypt, and finally to the United States where he lived in Boston, New Orleans, and Honolulu before retiring in Mexico.

He was an active portrait painter well into his 70s and many famous people were among his subjects including Justices Brandeis and Frankfurter of the US Supreme Court, Professors George Lyman Kittredge and Paul Freund of Harvard University, Cardinal Stritch, Yitzhak Ben-Zvi, Hayim Bialik, Ahad Ha-Am, Henrietta Szold, and many more.
