= Savely Zeydenberg =

Russian painter

Saveliy Moiseyevich Zeydenberg (Russian: Саве́лий Моисе́евич Зе́йденберг; 28 April 1862 – 1942) was a Russian painter.

== Biography ==
Saveliy Moiseyevich Zeydenberg was born on 28 April 1862 in Berdychiv, in the Kiev Governorate of the Russian Empire (present-day Ukraine). He studied painting at the Saint Petersburg Academy of Arts, graduating in 1891, by presenting the paintings "Joseph Sold by His Brothers" and "Moses Receiving the Tablets".

Zeydenberg was active in the artistic circle founded in Saint Petersburg by Arkhip Ivanovich Kuindzhi. He was awarded distinctions at various exhibition in Russia, among which a gold medal in 1890 for the painting "Saint Peter Healing a Lame Man". In the following years, he presented several paintings depicting the live of the Jewish population in Russian provincial towns.

In 1891 Zeydenberg was appointed professor of art history at the Saint Petersburg Academy of Arts.

== Bibliography ==
- Энциклопедия благотворительности Санкт-Петербурга - Общество Имени А. И. Куинджи
- Зейденберг (Зайденберг) Савелий Моисеевич
- Большая биографическая энциклопедия Зейденберг, С. М.
