= Elye Spivak =

Soviet Jewish linguist

- עליע ספּיוואַק
- Born: 10 December 1890; Vasilkov, Russian Empire
- Died: 4 April 1950 (aged 59); Moscow, Soviet Union

Academic background
- Education: Moscow State University

Academic work
- Discipline: Linguistics, dialectology, lexicology
- Institutions: Odessa Pedagogical Institute, All-Ukrainian Academy of Sciences

Eliyahu "Elye" Spivak (Yiddish: אֵלִיָּהוּ ״עליע״ ספּיוואַק, Russian: Эля Гершевич Спивак; (Note: Also spelled אליע in Yiddish. Spivak's name was occasionally Russified as Ilya Grigorievich Spivak (Russian: Илья Григорьевич Спивак).) 10 December 1890 – 4 April 1950) was a Soviet Jewish linguist, philologist, and pedagogue.

== Biography ==
Spivak was born to a religious Jewish family in Vasilkov, Kiev Governorate in the Russian Empire. He survived the 1919 Vasilkov pogroms, in which Symon Petliura's armies massacred over fifty Jews. Spivak worked as a teacher in various cities, including Vasilkov, Glukhov, Kiev, and Kharkov, and was appointed professor of Yiddish linguistics at the Odessa Pedagogical Institute in 1925. Spivak published some fifty Yiddish textbooks and teaching aids, in collaboration with David Hofstein and others, and co-edited the pedagogical journal Ratnbildung ('Soviet Education') from 1929 to 1931.

Following Nochum Shtif's death in 1933, Spivak was appointed director of the linguistics section of the All-Ukrainian Academy of Sciences' Institute for Jewish Proletarian Culture (Russian: Институт Еврейской Пролетарской Культуры) and editor of its journal, Afn shprakhfront ('On the Language Front'). The Institute was closed down in early 1936 amid the Great Purge, with many of its staff members arrested on charges of Trotskyism. The smaller Office for the Study of Soviet Jewish Literature, Language, and Folklore was created in its place, with Spivak as director. Along with the rest of the Office, Spivak was evacuated to Ufa, Bashkiria with the Axis invasion of the Soviet Union, and returned in 1944.

Spivak, a member of the Jewish Anti-Fascist Committee, was arrested in January 1949 under charges of Jewish nationalism. He died on 4 April 1950 in the Lefortovo Prison in Moscow from an intracerebral hemorrhage while under interrogation.

== Work ==
Spivak played a major role in Soviet Yiddish language planning. He sought to compromise between Russification of Yiddish and the purported nationalism of the use of words of Hebrew-Aramaic origin, and wrote in favour of a partial de-Hebraization of Soviet Yiddish. Spivak opposed new coinages based on Hebraic elements not present in pre-revolutionary Yiddish, promoting instead the introduction of Russian, Ukrainian and Belarusian internationalisms.

While at the Institute for Jewish Proletarian Culture, Spivak put forward the idea of compiling a comprehensive Russian-Yiddish dictionary, a project which began in 1935. Though completed in 1948, the dictionary's manuscript and other research materials were confiscated by the Soviet security organs upon the arrest of Spivak and its other authors. The dictionary was published posthumously in 1984.

== Publications ==
The following is a partial list of Spivak's publications (not including textbooks):

- Yidishe shprakh 1: Intonatsye, fonetik un ortografye, elementn fun morfologye (יידישע שפּראך: אינטאָנאציע פאָנטעיק און אָרטאָגראפיע, עלעמענטן פון מאָרפאָלאָגיע, 'Yiddish Language, Part I: Intonation, phonetics and orthography, elements of morphology') (Kiev: Kultur-lige, 1925)
- Yidishe shprakh 2: Morfologye un sintaks ('Yiddish Language, Part I: Morphology and syntax') (Kiev: Kultur-lige, 1926)
- Metodik fun shprakh un literatur in shul ('Methods for language and literature in school') (Kiev, 1928)
- Shprakh-kultur: teorye un praktik (שפּראכ-קולטור: טעאָריע און פּראקטיק, 'Language culture: theory and practice') (Kiev, 1931)
- Maks un engels vegn shprakh-problemes (מארקס און ענגעלס וועגן שפּראך-פּראָבּלעמלעס, 'Marx and Engels on language issues') (Kiev, 1934)
- Matematishe terminologye ('Mathematical terminology') (Kiev, 1935)
- Geografishe terminologye ('Geographical terminology') (Kiev-Kharkov, 1936)
- Naye vortshafung ('New Word Formation') (Kiev, 1939)
- Sholem-aleykhems shprakh un stil: etyudn (שאָלעם־אלײכעמס שפּראך און סטיל :עטיודן, 'Sholem Aleichem's language and style: studies') (Kiev, 1940)
- Rusish-yidisher rekhtlekh-administrativer verterbukh ('Russian-Yiddish Dictionary of Legal and Administrative Terminology') (Kiev, 1941)
- Di shprakh in di teg fun der foterlendisher milkhome (די שפּראך אין די טעג פון דער פאָטערלאנדישער מילכאָמע, 'Language in the Time of the Patriotic War') (Kiev, 1946)

== See also ==
- Night of the Murdered Poets
