= Ian Rubin =

Russian rugby league footballer (born 1973)

Personal information
- Born: 17 April 1973 (age 53) Odesa, Soviet Union

Playing information
- Height: 191 cm (6 ft 3 in)
- Weight: 110 kg (17 st 5 lb; 240 lb)
- Position: Prop
Club
Years	Team	Pld	T	G	FG	P
1996–99	South Sydney	45	0	0	0	0
2000–01	Sydney Roosters	39	2	0	0	8
	Total	84	2	0	0	8
Representative
Years	Team	Pld	T	G	FG	P
1998–00	Russia	10	1	0	0	4

Ian Rubin (Ukrainian: Ян Рубін; born 17 April 1973) is a former Russia international rugby league footballer who played as a forward in the 1990s and 2000s. He played the majority of his professional career in the National Rugby League for the Sydney Roosters and the South Sydney Rabbitohs clubs. Rubin also played on several occasions for his adopted country of Russia, including four appearances as captain of the Russian national team at the 2000 World Cup after qualifying to play for them via the grandparent rule.

== Background ==
Rubin was born in Odesa, Soviet Union.

== Club career ==
=== South Sydney Rabbitohs ===
Rubin is Jewish. After his family emigrated to Australia in his teens settling in Sydney, Rubin took up rugby league while at school where he was eventually spotted by Rabbitohs scouts in the early 1990s. Rubin then signed his first professional contract for the South Sydney Rabbitohs for the beginning of the 1996 season where he quickly began playing in the first team side for the Sydney club usually playing as an impact prop-forward off the bench.

Rubin eventually made his name as a workhorse forward and over the next three years would go on to make forty-five appearances for the South Sydney side.

=== Sydney Roosters ===
Rubin signed for cross-town rivals the Sydney Roosters for the beginning of the 2000 season where he would put together an impressive string of performances for his new club quickly cementing his place as a starting prop-forward and appearing at prop forward in the Roosters 2000 NRL Grand Final loss to the Brisbane Broncos. Shortly after he travelled to England to captain Russia in their 2000 World Cup campaign.

Altogether Rubin would only play two seasons for the Roosters but appeared in close to every fixture and captained the club on the odd occasion.

== International career ==
Rubin was originally enquired about by Russian management during 1998 as to where his heritage lay and whether or not he would be able to represent Russia for their World Cup qualifying fixtures in their bid to gain entry for the 2000 competition.

Although Rubin was born in Ukraine, both of his grandparents had originally come from Russia which meant Rubin was allowed to represent the Russian national side. From 1998 onwards he would help his adopted country to qualify for the Rugby League World Cup and then take part in their campaign as captain but ultimately they had a disappointing tournament, failing to win a match against superior competition in Australia, England and Fiji.

== See also ==
- List of select Jewish rugby league players
