= Michael Dorfman =

Writer and activist (born 1954)

- Міхаель Дорфман
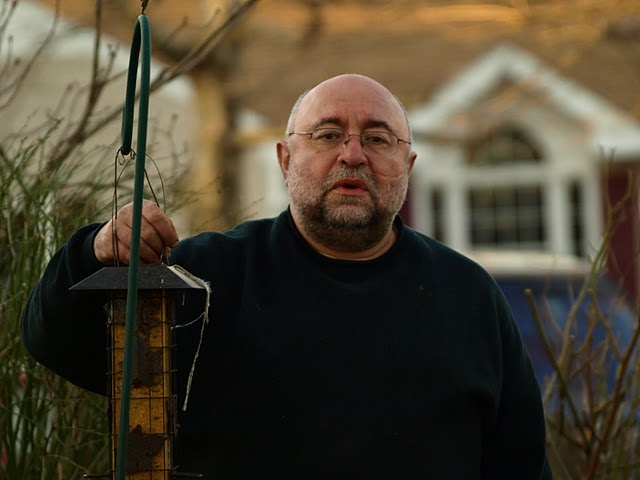
- Dorfman in 2010
- Born: 17 September 1954 (age 71); Lviv, Ukraine, USSR
- Citizenship: USA, Israel

Michael Dorfman (Ukrainian: Міхаель Дорфман, Russian: Михаэль Дорфман, Hebrew: מיכאל דורפמן; born 17 September 1954) is a writer, essayist, journalist, human rights activist and activist of the Yiddish culture revivalist movement.

== Career ==
He was an activist of the Yiddish culture revivalist movement among Russian Jewry. Dorfman published three books and roughly 150 articles about the Yiddish Culture revivalist movement. He is an organizer of many festivals and cultural events in Russia and Ukraine.

He was first published in the Russian-Israeli magazine Kroog (The Circle) in 1983. Dorfman later worked as the publisher and chief-editor of the Russian-Israeli newspapers Negev and Aspects between 1992 and 1999. He pioneered print journalism for local Russian-speaking communities.

In 1994, Dorfman established the NGO LaMerkhav ('At large' in Hebrew) which dealt with abuse, violence, and discrimination in Israeli public schools. Projects included a hotline for children, the Center for Monitoring Child Abuse, and support groups for schoolchildren who were victims of hate-motivated violence. LaMerkhav conducted unique projects for developing community leadership for young people

In 1999, he led an initiative with the Russian Panthers that turned Israel's public attention to the problems and racism faced by Russian children in public schools.

In 2000–2009, he contributed to human rights and social justice groups in Israel and territories under Israeli occupation. Since 2004, living in the US, he has been a regular contributor to the Jerusalem literary and journalistic magazine Nota Bene.

== Books ==
- Михаэль Дорфман, Евреи и жизнь. Холокост – это смешно? ISBN 978-5-17-053210-0, Second edition ISBN 978-5-9713-8228-7, ISBN 978-5-903925-03-2, ISBN 978-5-226-01028-6
- Михаэль Дорфман, Евреи и жизнь. Свастика в Иерусалиме ISBN 978-5-17-053211-7, Second edition ISBN 978-5-9713-8229-4, 978-5-903925-07-0, Third edition ISBN 978-5-226-00776-7
- Михаэль Дорфман, Евреи и жизнь. Холокост – это смешно? ISBN 978-5-17-055185-9, Second edition ISBN 978-5-9713-9695-6, 978-5-903925-10-0, 978-5-226-01029-3
