= Pavel Kogan (poet) =

Soviet poet

Pavel Davidovich Kogan (Russian: Па́вел Дави́дович Кога́н; 7 July 1918, Kyiv – 23 September 1942, near Novorossiysk) was a Jewish Soviet poet who died fighting as a soldier in the Second World War.

== Life ==
Though born in Kyiv, Ukrainian State, Pavel and his family moved to Moscow in 1922. He studied at the Maxim Gorky Literature Institute and at the Moscow Institute of History, Philosophy and Literature.

Kogan twice hiked the trails of central Russia. He learned about World War II while on a geological expedition to Armenia. Returning immediately to Moscow, he tried to enlist in the army, but was turned down due to his poor health. Undeterred, he finished a series of courses and became a military interpreter. In 1942, Kogan was killed by the Germans while leading a reconnaissance mission, aged 24.

All of his poems were published posthumously. They became famous during the Khrushchev Thaw, mainly due to a popular song called "Brigantina" (Brigantine, 1937) which was written using his lyrics.
