= Andriy Oberemko =

Ukrainian professional football player (born 1984)

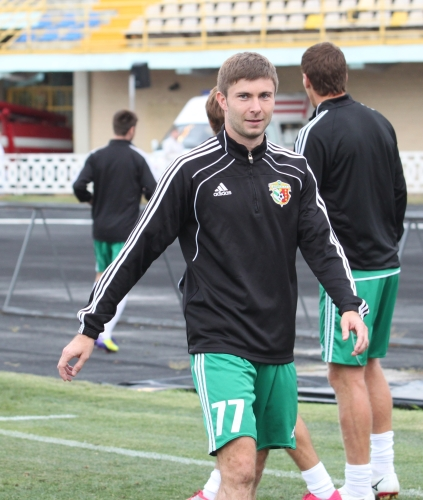
- Oberemko in 2011

Personal information
- Full name: Andriy Oleksandrovych Oberemko
- Date of birth: 18 March 1984 (age 42)
- Place of birth: Tokmak, Ukrainian SSR, Soviet Union
- Height: 1.82 m (6 ft 0 in)
- Position: Midfielder

Youth career
- 2000–2001: Dynamo Kyiv

Senior career*
Years	Team	Apps	(Gls)
2000–2010	Dynamo Kyiv	1	(0)
2000–2004	→ Dynamo-3 Kyiv	33	(0)
2001–2005	→ Dynamo-2 Kyiv	80	(1)
2004	→ Borysfen Boryspil (loan)	1	(0)
2005–2006	→ Kharkiv (loan)	26	(0)
2006	→ Dynamo-2 Kyiv	1	(0)
2007–2009	→ Illichivets Mariupol (loan)	58	(5)
2009	→ Kryvbas Kryvyi Rih (loan)	6	(0)
2010	→ Dynamo-2 Kyiv	13	(2)
2011–2012	Vorskla Poltava	22	(2)
2012–2015	Metalist Kharkiv	0	(0)
2013	→ Metalurh Zaporizhzhia (loan)	4	(0)
2013–2015	→ Illichivets Mariupol (loan)	14	(0)

International career
2003–2006	Ukraine U21	24	(0)
Medal record
Men's football
Representing Ukraine
UEFA European Under-21 Championship
Runner-up	2006 Portugal
- * Club domestic league appearances and goals

Andriy Oleksandrovych Oberemko (Ukrainian: Андрій Олександрович Оберемко; born 18 March 1984) is a Ukrainian former professional association football player.

== Playing career ==
Oberemko was born in Tokmak, Zaporizhzhia Oblast, Ukrainian SSR, and is Jewish. In 2006, Oberemko attracted interest from Israeli club Beitar Jerusalem. Being Jewish, Oberemko would not count against the clubs' foreign player cap. Kyiv demanded $220,000 for Oberemko. Talks eventually stalled, and Oberemko ended up leaving Kyiv on a free transfer to FC Kharkiv.

== National team ==
As a member of the Ukraine national under-21 football team, Oberemko competed at the 2006 UEFA European Under-21 Football Championship in Portugal. The team was defeated in the final by the Netherlands.
