= Nicolai Jasnogrodsky =

Russian-born American chess master

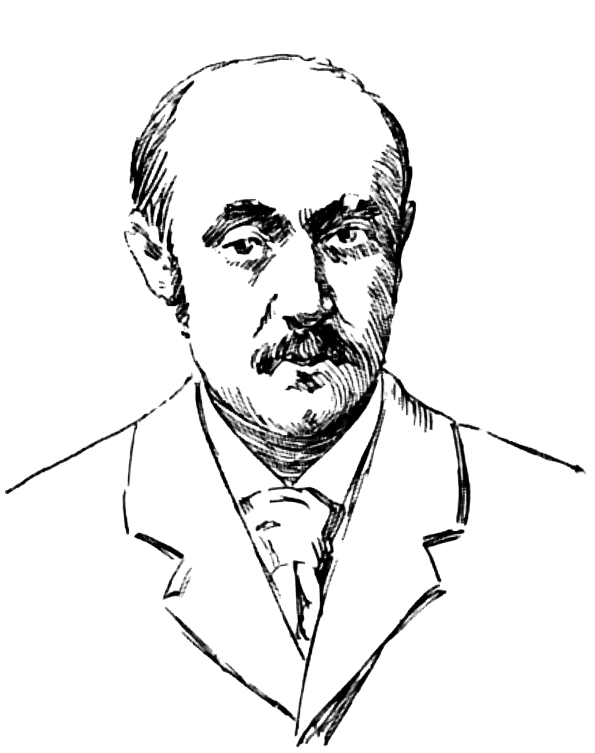
- Illustration of Jasnogrodsky in a 1905 publication

Personal information
- Born: Nicolai Jasnogrodsky; August 6, 1859 Lubny
- Died: April 23, 1914 (aged 54) New York City

Chess career
- Country: Russia United States

Nicolai Jasnogrodsky (6 August 1859, Lubny – 23 April 1914, New York City) was a Russian–born American chess master.

Jasnogrodsky started to play competitive chess around 1885 in Vienna, and moved to England in the 1880s. He tied for 4-5th at Amsterdam 1889 (B tournament, Adolf Georg Olland and F. van den Berg won), and in 1890 earned the title of chess master at Amsterdam.

Jasnogrodsky became part of the chess fraternity of the Simpson's-in-the-Strand by 1891 and made a name for himself as a skilled simultaneous and blindfold player. In London tournaments he took 10th (Rudolf Loman won) and tied for 4-5th (Henry Bird won) in 1891, and took 8th (Emanuel Lasker won) in 1892. He drew a match with Bird (7.5 : 7.5) at London 1893.

In the summer of 1893 Jasnogrodsky came to the United States, attracted by the announcements of the Columbian Chess Congress. He arrived in New York City on an Arizona steamship on August 11. The Congress was not held due to the lack of sufficient funds, but Jasnogrodsky, like other masters, remained in the New World. He participated in the Impromptu International Tournament where he finished 12th (Emanuel Lasker won).

He won the New York State Championship in late 1896, and also tied for 10-11th at New York 1894 (Wilhelm Steinitz won), lost a match to Eugene Delmar (1.5 : 5.5) at New York 1895, won against Manuel Marquez Sterling (5 : 0) in 1895, lost to David Graham Baird (1 : 2) in 1895, and drew a match with Frank James Marshall (3.5 : 3.5) at New York 1898.

He developed the Jasnogrodsky Defense against the Rice Gambit (1.e4 e5 2.f4 exf4 3.Nf3 g5 4.h4 g4 5.Ne5 Nf6 6.Bc4 d5 7.exd5 Bd6 8.O-O Bxe5 9.Re1 Qe7 10.c3 Nh5).

Jasnogrodsky died at Montefiore Home, Hospital and Country Sanitarium for Chronic Diseases. He was buried in Union Field Cemetery, for members of the New York City's Jewish community.
