= Naum Krasner =

Russian mathematician and economist

Naum Krasner (21 February 1924 – 5 March 1999) was a Russian mathematician and economist.

== Biography ==
Born on 21 February 1924 in Vinnitsa, Ukrainian SSR. In 1941 he graduated from high school. In autumn 1941 he evacuated to Kuibyshev region, worked as a teacher in a rural school. A former colonel in the Soviet Army, he joined Voronezh State University as a student in 1957 and, on graduating in 1961, joined the faculty there. In 1969 he became Methods of Operational Research Chair and, later, vice-dean of the Faculty of Applied Mathematics and Mechanics.

Died on 5 March 1999 of lung cancer. Buried at the Kominternovsky cemetery in Voronezh.
