= Iosif Pogrebyssky =

Ukrainian chess player

Iosif Benediktovich Pogrebyssky (Pogrebysski, Pogrebissky) (February 23, 1906, Uman - May 20, 1971, Leningrad) was a Ukrainian chess master.

He played several times in Ukrainian Chess Championship, and took third at Poltava 1927 ( as Alexey Selezniev won), finished fifth at Odessa 1928 (Yakov Vilner won), shared first at Kiev 1936, placed second, behind Fedor Bogatyrchuk, at Kiev 1937, and tied for second-third places at Kiev 1949 (Isaac Lipnitsky won). He won a match against Mikhail Yudovich (9 : 7) in 1937.

Pogrebyssky earned a Ph.D. in mathematics at Kiev State University in 1940.
