= Grigory Goldenberg =

Russian revolutionary (1855–1880)

- Born: 1855; Berdychiv, Russian Empire
- Died: July 1880 (aged 24–25); Odessa, Russian Empire

Grigory Goldenberg (also referred to as Gregory Goldenberg or "Grigorii Goldenberg"; 1855–1880) was a Russian revolutionary and member of Narodnaya Volya ("People's Will").

== Revolutionary life ==
Born at Berdychiv, son of a Jewish merchant, according to Richard Pipes in his book, The Degaev Affair: Terror and Treason in Tsarist Russia, Goldenberg abandoned his Orthodox Jewish family and upbringing as a youth. Having established contacts with revolutionaries he moved to Minsk where he became involved in revolutionary politics.

Goldenberg was arrested and exiled in 1878 to Arkhangelsk for his revolutionary activities. He escaped and assassinated Kharkov Governor-General Prince Dmitri Kropotkin (cousin of a famous anarchist) in February 1879. After his successful assassination of the Governor of Kharkov and eluding subsequent arrest, that June (1879) he attended the secret gathering at Lipetsk which created North dnata Volya and was elected to its executive committee. He volunteered to assassinate Alexander II but was dissuaded on the grounds that it would be unwise for this to be done by a Jew. He was then rearrested on November 14, 1879, in Elizavetgrad with a suitcase full of nitroglycerine, which he intended to deliver to associates in Moscow to blow up a train carrying the tsar.

Pipes further claims that once Goldenberg was incarcerated in Odessa (in November 1879) he was left alone for two months, after which he was interrogated by Odessa deputy procurator A. F. Dorbrzhinskii. Goldenberg was the first to be tested with this new interrogation approach, later used by Lieutenant Colonel Georgy Sudeykin. Yarmolinsky describes Goldenberg as "not unintelligent, but... inordinately gullible and given to day-dreaming" and "self-exaltation". This led him to, prompted by skillful interrogation, into a vision the liberation of Russia through the Tsar's change of heart. The idea suggested to him by the police was that the use of terrorism was blocking real plans by the Tsar for further political reform. Therefore, the imprisonment of Narodnaya Volya and the end of its assassination campaign would lead to those liberal reforms being ushered in by the Tsar and, "under the sun of freedom the way would be speedily prepared for the advent of Socialism." Overjoyed, Goldenberg confessed his own involvement and willingly disclosed everything he knew about the paramilitary operations and membership of the People's Will.

After conversations with a fellow prisoner, however, Goldenberg realized that he had been tricked. Unable to live with himself, he committed suicide in prison July 1880.
