= Shmuel Dayan =

Israeli politician (1891-1968)

- שמואל דיין
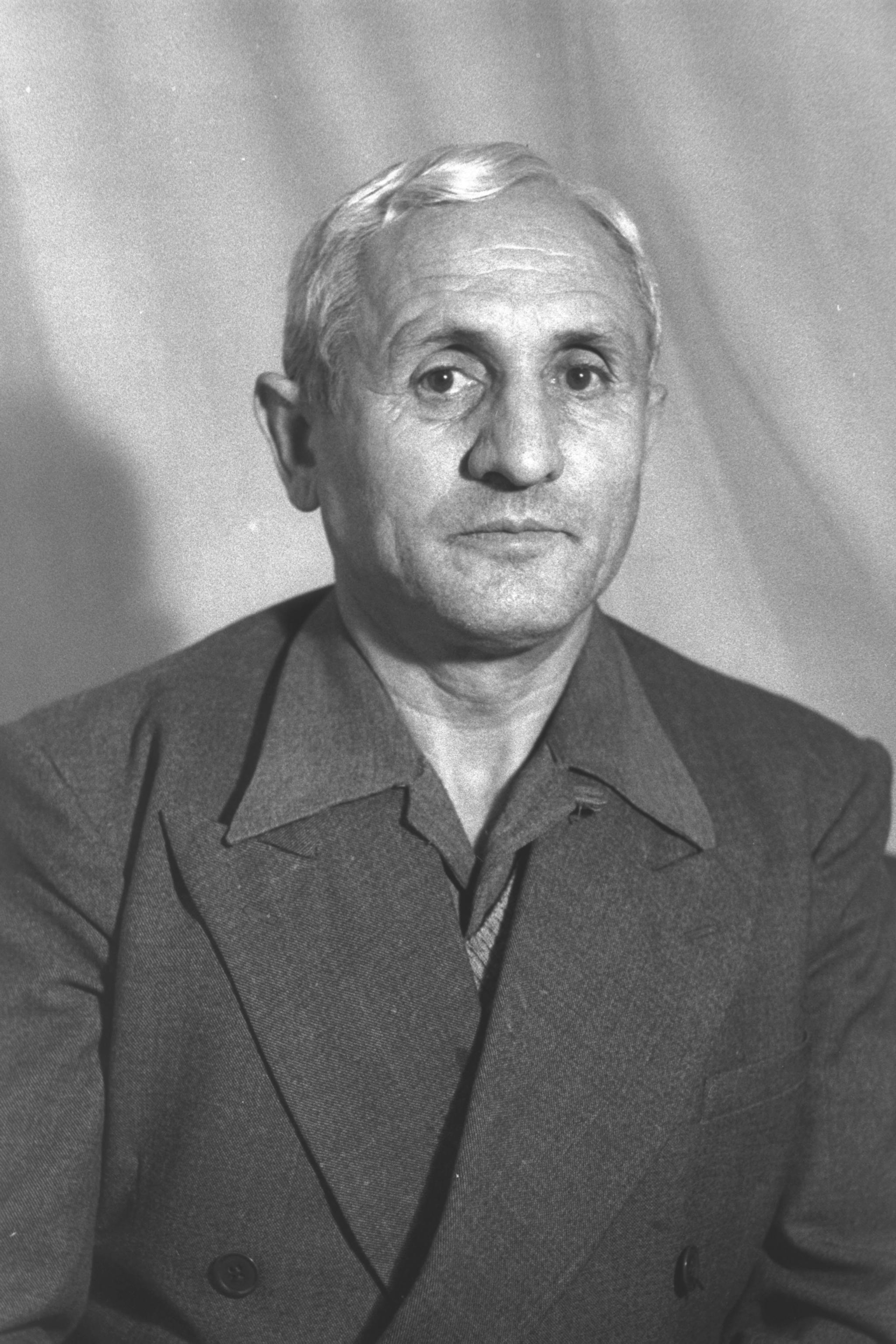

Faction represented in the Knesset
- 1949–1959: Mapai

Personal details
- Born: August 8, 1891 Zhashkiv, Russian Empire
- Died: 11 August 1968 (aged 77)

Shmuel Dayan (Hebrew: שמואל דיין; 8 August 1891 – 11 August 1968) was a Zionist activist during the British Mandate of Palestine and an Israeli politician who served in the first three Knessets.

== Biography ==
Born in the town of Zhashkiv in the Russian Empire (today in Ukraine), he joined the Zionist movement as a boy and emigrated to Palestine, then under Ottoman rule, in 1908. He worked in agriculture in Petah Tikva, Rehovot, Yavne'el and Kinneret until 1911, when he became active in Hapoel Hatzair (the Young Workers Party). He was also one of the earliest settlers in Degania, the country's first kibbutz, though he left in 1921 to help establish the moshav Nahalal. According to his grandson, he, as opposed to his wife Dvora, (née Zatolowsky, 1890-1956, born in Prochorovska, Ukraine), never personally worked more than 2 weeks at the kibbutz, but spent most of his life in hotels. As one of the leaders of the nascent Moshav Movement, he made several trips to the United States and Poland as a Zionist emissary.

In 1949, he was elected to the First Knesset for the Mapai party, and served as Deputy Speaker of the Knesset. In 1951, he used his official Service Passport to travel abroad, mainly to the US, on official meetings. He continued as a member of the next two Knessets, until 1959.

Dayan died in 1968 and was buried in Nahalal Cemetery. He was the father of Israeli general and politician Moshe Dayan and the grandfather of politicians Yael Dayan, Uzi Dayan and director Assi Dayan.

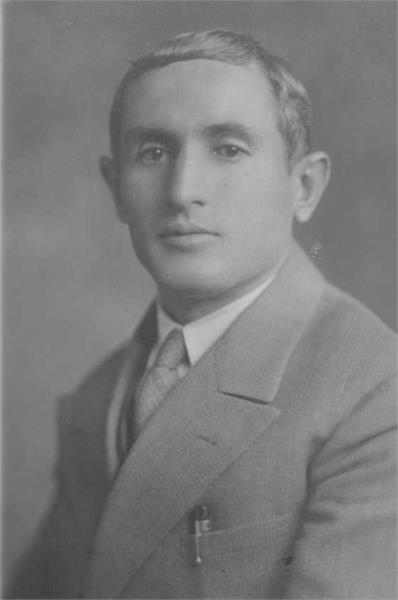
Shmuel Dayan 1920

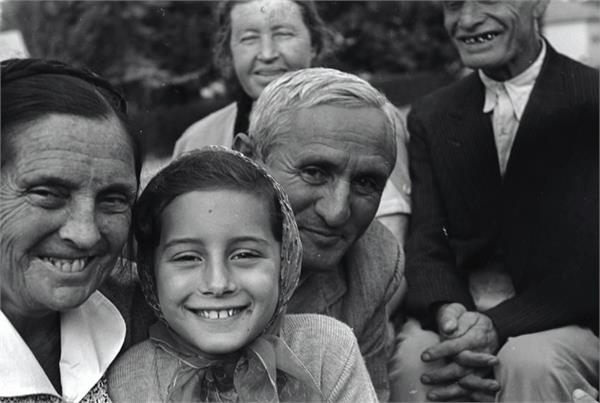
Shmuel Dayan with wife, parents & daughter 1946
