= Jacob Rabinow =

American inventor and engineer (1910–1999)

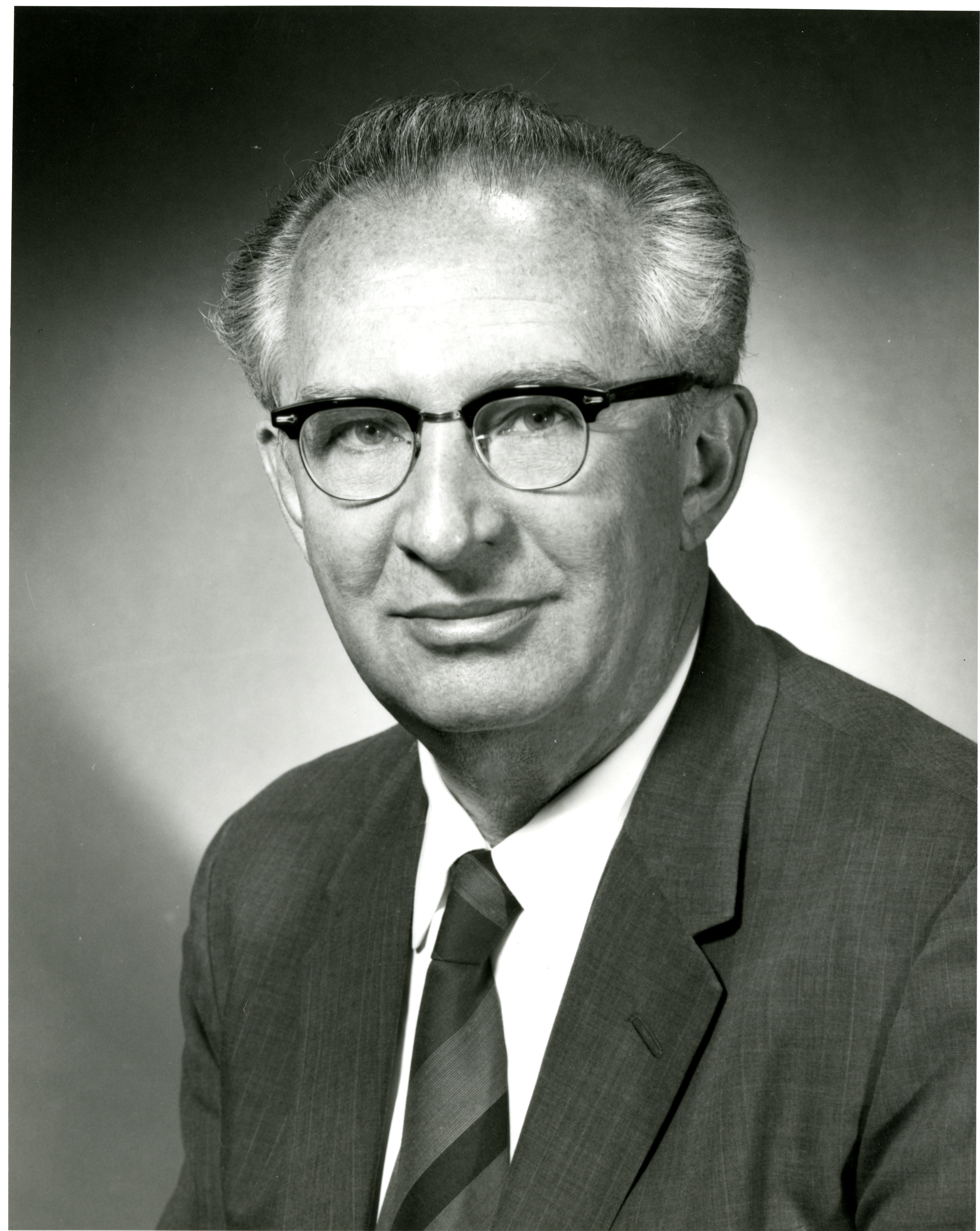
Jacob Rabinow

Jacob Rabinow (January 8, 1910 – September 11, 1999) was an American engineer and inventor. He earned a total of 229 U.S. patents on a variety of mechanical, optical and electrical devices.

== Biography ==
Rabinow was born in Kharkiv, Ukraine, on January 8, 1910. In 1919, his family moved to China, then in 1921 to the United States. He graduated from the City College of New York with a Bachelor's Degree in Engineering in 1933, and a Master's Degree in Electrical Engineering in 1934. His career as an inventor began when he was hired as a mechanical engineer in 1938 by the National Bureau of Standards (now the National Institute of Standards and Technology, or NIST). He made many developments there, mainly in defense systems, and eventually became Chief of the Electro-Mechanical Ordnance Division at NBS before leaving in 1954 to form his own company.

During this time, Rabinow invented and patented a number of revolutionary devices. Among them are the first disc-shaped magnetic storage media for computers (1954), the magnetic particle clutch (1956), the first straight-line phonograph (1959), the first self-regulating clock (1960) and his famous "reading machine" (1960) which was the first to use the "best match" principle and was the basis for the reading, sorting and processing machines used today by banks and post offices.

In 1964, Rabinow's company joined Control Data Corporation (CDC), and until 1972 he was Vice President of CDC and head of the Rabinow Advanced Development Laboratory. In 1968 Rabinow formed the RABCO company to manufacture straight-line phonographs, and the company was later bought out by Harman Kardon Corporation. In 1972 he returned to NBS where he was Chief Research Engineer until his retirement in 1989.

In addition to his patents, Jacob Rabinow was awarded many other merits for his scientific achievements. Among them are the President's Certificate of Merit (1948), the Industrial R&D Scientist of the Year Award (1960), the IEEE's Harry Diamond Award (1977), and the Lemelson-MIT Lifetime Achievement Award (1998). He published his book, Inventing for Fun and Profit, in 1989. He also delivered many speeches and lectures on inventions and technology, as a guest at many educational institutions and on several television and radio shows. He also served on the board of trustees for Science Service, now known as Society for Science & the Public, from 1971 to 1973.

The Jacob Rabinow Applied Research Award was created by the National Bureau of Standards (now the National Institute of Standards and Technology, or NIST) and first presented in 1975 for outstanding achievements in the practical application of the results of scientific or engineering research.

Rabinow was inducted into the National Inventors Hall of Fame in 2005.
