= Eduard Bagritsky =

Russian and Soviet poet

- Born: Eduard Godelevich Dzyubin; 3 November [O.S. 22 October] 1895; Odessa, Russian Empire
- Died: 16 February 1934 (aged 38); Moscow, USSR
- Occupation: Poet

Eduard Georgyevich Bagritsky (Russian: Эдуа́рд Гео́ргиевич Багри́цкий, IPA: [ɨdʊˈard ɡʲɪˈorɡʲɪjɪvʲɪdʑ bɐˈɡrʲitskʲɪj]; 3 November [O.S. 22 October] 1895 – 16 February 1934) was a prominent Russian and Soviet poet of the Constructivist School.

He was a Neo-Romantic early in his poetic career; he was also a part of the so-called Odessa School of Russian writers (which also included Isaak Babel, Yuri Olesha, Valentin Katayev, Vera Inber, Ilya Ilf and Yevgeni Petrov, among others). A large number of this school's writers were Odessa natives who often incorporated Ukrainian inflections and vocabulary into their writing.

== Biography ==
Born Eduard Godelevich Dzyubin (Russian: Эдуа́рд Гео́ргиевич Дзю́бин, IPA: [ˈdzʲʉbʲɪn]; Ukrainian: Дзю́бін) in Odessa to a Jewish middle-class family, most of his creative career took place in Moscow. After his early death from asthma, his friends helped to publish several of his works posthumously to provide financial assistance to his family. Isaak Babel, for example, planned to write a screenplay based on Bagritsky's long poem "Duma about Opanas" (the script was never finished and was eventually lost).

Bagritsky was heavily influenced by the Russian Revolution and Civil War. His poetry often touches on the subjects of violence, revolutionary morality, sexuality and its interethnic sociological problems. His worldview was extremely unsentimental, and earned him much invective from detractors from all sides who saw his poetry as vindictive toward both his Jewish origins and the host Russian culture.

In his book Russian Poet/Soviet Jew: The Legacy of Eduard Bagritskii (2000), Maxim D. Shrayer investigated the path of this major Jewish poet writing in the Russian language and examined Bagritsky's contested legacy. The book included English translations of some Bagrtisky's works.

Bagritsky's long poem February (1933–34) was published in a translation by Roman Turovsky in 2017 in the literary journal Cardinal Points.

In his poetry of the last period of his life Bagritsky managed to covertly criticise the growing oppressive Stalinist regime. Bagritsky who had been suffering from bronchial asthma from childhood died form complications due to pneumonia in Moscow in 1934, aged 38. He was buried at the Novodevichy Cemetery.

== Family ==
Bagritsky's wife, Lidia Gustavovna Suok (of Czech and Austrian descent), had two sisters who also married noted writers: Olga married Yuri Olesha and Serafima married Vladimir Narbut. Bagritsky's son Vsevolod (killed early in World War II) was also a notable Russian poet, whose fiancée Yelena Bonner (eventually the wife of Andrei Sakharov) later was a notable Russian dissident.

== See also ==
- Silver Age of Russian Poetry
