= It's a Man's World (Ed Ames album) =

Studio album by Ed Ames
- Released: December 1965
- Studios: RCA Victor's Studio "A", New York City, New York
- Genre: Pop
- Length: 32:27
- Label: RCA Victor
- Producer: Jim Foglesong

Ed Ames chronology
My Kind of Songs (1965)	It's a Man's World (1965)	More I Cannot Wish You (1966)

Singles from It's a Man's World
- 1. "River Boy" Released: January 1966

It's a Man's World is a studio album by American singer and actor Ed Ames released in late 1965. It was his fourth original album for RCA Victor Records. It contained a total of 12 tracks, including one lead single. The material chosen was a mix between contemporary, original songs and traditional pop standards. The album received a positive critical reception following its release, and made a small impression on the US album charts.

== Background, recording and content ==
Ed Ames had been a recording artist for RCA Victor since the 1950s, gaining prominence during his time with the Ames Brothers. By 1965, Ames had established a solo recording career following the release of Opening Night with Ed Ames, The Ed Ames Album, and My Kind of Songs. It's a Man's World was produced by Jim Foglesong, and was one of two to be recorded at RCA Victor's Studio "A", located in New York City, New York. Foglesong would produce for Ames for the rest of the decade.

It's a Man's World consisted of 12 tracks in total. Selections included various musical, folk and pop songs, such as "Feeling Good" from The Roar of the Greasepaint – The Smell of the Crowd, "Luck Be a Lady" from Guys and Dolls, "A Man and a Woman" from the namesake film released in 1966, A Man and a Woman. "Mingo, the Man with the Bullwhip" was an Ames original, with him doing the bullwhip noises featured in the song. "Daniel Boone" along with "River Boy" were also Ames originals, the latter getting a single release in late January 1966.

== Release ==
The album was originally released in December 1965 by RCA Victor. It was the fourth studio album of Ames' solo singing career. The label originally offered it as a vinyl LP, with six songs on "Side A" and six songs on "Side B". It was available in stereo and monaural sound. Since then, it has been digitized onto streaming platforms in the 2020s as well.

== Critical reception ==
Professional ratings
Review scores
Source	Rating
Cashbox	Positive (Pop Best Best)
The Virgin Encyclopedia of Popular Music	3/5 stars

The album was given a positive review from Cashbox magazine following its original release. Putting the album in its "Pop Best Bets" section, the publication stated that "Baritone Ed Ames should add many fans to his following with this collection. Included in the LP is 'Mingo, the Man with the Bullwhip,' written solely for the package to describe the character's current role on the Daniel Boone TV series, folk tune 'John Henry,' and romantic ballad 'A Man and a Woman.'" They believed that "This set is just right for fans of easy-going music." Retrospectively, The Virgin Encyclopedia of Popular Music gave the album a three-star rating, which meant that the album was "good by the artist's usual standards" and "therefore recommended."

== Chart performance ==
The album debuted on Record World magazine's LP's Coming Up chart in the issue dated January 29, 1966, peaking at No. 125 during a six-week run. It became his first charting album, though it was only ranked on Record World, missing other major magazine charts.

== Track listing ==
Side one
No.	Title	Writer(s)	Length
1.	"Mingo, the Man with the Bullwhip"	John Chadwick; Bill Chadwick-Friedman	3:17
2.	"John Henry"	Traditional	2:53
3.	"A Man and a Woman"	Harvey Schmidt; Tom Jones	2:18
4.	"What Color (Is a Man)"	Marge Barton	2:06
5.	"My Horses Ain't Hungry"	John Jacob Niles	2:00
6.	"They Call the Wind Maria"	Alan Jay Lerner; Frederick Loewe	2:54
Total length:			15:28

Side two
No.	Title	Writer(s)	Length
1.	"River Boy"	Fred F. Carter Jr.	2:24
2.	"Feeling Good"	Anthony Newley; Leslie Bricusse	2:17
3.	"Daniel Boone"	Lionel Newman; Vera Matson	2:29
4.	"Joey, Joey, Joey"	Frank Loesser	4:20
5.	"The Erie Canal"	Traditional	2:37
6.	"Luck Be a Lady"	Frank Loesser	2:52
Total length:			16:59

== Release history ==
Region	Date	Format	Label	Ref.
North America	December 1965	LP Stereo; LP Mono	RCA Victor Records	
Worldwide	Circa 2020	Music download; streaming	Sony Music Entertainment	

== Charts ==
Chart performance for It's a Man's World
Chart (1966)	Peak position
US Record World LP's Coming Up	125

== Personnel ==
All credits are adapted from the liner notes of It's a Man's World.

- Ed Ames – vocals
- Mort Garson, (tracks: A4, B1, B3, B5) – arranger, conductor
- Perry Botkin Jr., (tracks: A1, A3, A5, A6) – arranger, conductor
- Stu Phillips, (tracks: A2, B2, B4, B6) – arranger, conductor
- John Norman – engineer
- Stan Levine – liner notes
- Jim Foglesong – producer
