= Mirette =

Mirette can refer to:

- Mirette (opera), a 19th-century comic opera by André Messager
- Mirette, the main character in the book and animated series Mirette Investigates by Fanny Joly
- Mirette on the High Wire, a children's book by Emily Arnold McCully
  - Mirette (musical), a musical by Harvey Schmidt, based on the book
- The Mirettes, backup singers for Ike & Tina Turner, originally called The Ikettes
