= Opening Night with Ed Ames =

Studio album by Ed Ames
- Released: January 1964
- Studio: Webster Hall, New York City, New York
- Genre: Pop
- Length: 33:18
- Label: RCA Victor
- Producer: Andy Wiswell

Ed Ames chronology
Opening Night with Ed Ames (1964)	The Ed Ames Album (1964)

Singles from Opening Night with Ed Ames
- 1. "Before I Kiss the World Goodbye" Released: October 1963; 2. "Try To Remember" Released: December 1964

Opening Night with Ed Ames is a Broadway-themed studio album by American singer and actor Ed Ames released in early 1964. It was his debut solo album for RCA Victor Records. It contained a total of 12 tracks, including two singles. The album received a positive critical reception following its release, though it missed the US album charts.

== Background, recording, and content ==
Ed Ames had been a recording artist for RCA Victor since the 1950s, gaining prominence during his time with the Ames Brothers. Opening Night with Ed Ames contained his first charting solo single, which was later highlighted on newer pressings. With arrangements by Claus Ogerman and Hal Mooney, the LP was Ames' first and only to be produced by Andy Wiswell, and was one of the few of his LPs to be recorded at Webster Hall, located in New York City, New York. Jim Foglesong would produce for Ames for the rest of the decade.

Opening Night with Ed Ames consisted of 12 tracks in total. Selections included various musical and film songs, such as "If Ever I Would Leave You" from Camelot and Try to Remember from The Fantastiks. "I Believe in You" was a contemporary standard from the 1961 musical How to Succeed in Business Without Really Trying, similar to "As Long as She Needs Me", which had been first shown in the musical Oliver!. Ames covered the big pop hit "What Kind of Fool Am I?" from Stop the World – I Want to Get Off as well.

== Release ==
The album was originally released in January 1964 by RCA Victor. It was the first solo studio album of Ames' career. The label originally offered it as a vinyl LP, with six songs on "Side A" and six songs on "Side B". It was available in stereo and monaural sound. Since then, it has been digitized onto streaming platforms in the 2020s as well, in a compilation with his 1966 album More I Cannot Wish You. The album contained two singles; "Before I Kiss the World Goodbye" from Jennie was released in October 1963, and "Try to Remember" from The Fantasticks was released in December 1964. The latter reached the top-75 on the Billboard Hot 100 and the top-20 of the Easy Listening chart.

== Critical reception ==
Professional ratings
Review scores
Source	Rating
Billboard	Positive (Pop Spotlight)
Cashbox	Positive (Pop Pick)

The album was given a positive review from Billboard magazine following its original release. Putting the album in its "Special Merit Pop Spotlight" section, the publication stated that "now singer and dramatic actor Ed Ames has a solid musical album here. For the most part, he is suited for the middle-of-the-road programming type, but there are a few tracks like 'Somewhere' and 'Why Have I Loved You,' which might appeal to folk-music stations as well." Cashbox reviewed the album in early March and stated that "The songster, with several Broadway credits to his name, is a natural for these excerpts from recent shows. His deep, rich voice serves him well here as he feelingfully essays such melodic items," calling it a "powerful vocal entry".

== Track listing ==
Side one
No.	Title	Writer(s)	Length
1.	"If Ever I Would Leave You"	Alan Jay Lerner; Frederick Loewe	3:12
2.	"What Kind of Fool Am I?"	Anthony Newley; Leslie Bricusse	1:52
3.	"Before I Kiss the World Goodbye"	Arthur Schwartz; Howard Dietz	2:40
4.	"Try to Remember"	Harvey Schmidt; Tom Jones	3:57
5.	"Somewhere"	Rick Besoyan	2:05
6.	"Her Face"	Bob Merrill	2:43
Total length:			16:29

Side two
No.	Title	Writer(s)	Length
1.	"I Believe in You"	Frank Loesser	3:05
2.	"My Love Is Yours"	Rick Besoyan	2:15
3.	"They Were You"	Harvey Schmidt; Tom Jones	2:53
4.	"Pretty Is"	Harvey Schmidt; Tom Jones	2:55
5.	"Where You Are"	Arthur Schwartz; Howard Dietz	2:45
6.	"As Long as She Needs Me"	Lionel Bart	2:34
Total length:			16:49

== Release history ==
Region	Date	Format	Label	Ref.
North America	January 1964	LP Stereo; LP Mono	RCA Victor Records	
Worldwide	Circa 2020	Music download; streaming	Sony Music Entertainment	

== Personnel ==
All credits are adapted from the liner notes of Opening Night with Ed Ames.

- Ed Ames – vocals
- Claus Ogerman, (tracks: A1, A2, A4, A5, A6, B1, B2, B4, B6) – conductor
- Hal Mooney, (tracks: A3, B3, B5) – conductor
- Ernie Oelrich – recording engineer
- Mickey Crofford – recording engineer
- Andy Wiswell – producer
