= More I Cannot Wish You (album) =

Studio album by Ed Ames
- Released: September 1966
- Recorded: Mid 1966
- Studios: RCA Victor's Studio A, New York City, New York
- Genre: Traditional pop
- Length: 36:13
- Label: RCA Victor
- Producer: Jim Foglesong

Ed Ames chronology
It's a Man's World (1966)	More I Cannot Wish You (1966)	My Cup Runneth Over (1967)

More I Cannot Wish You is a studio album by American singer and actor Ed Ames released in late 1966 by RCA Victor Records. It was his third album devoted primarily to songs from Broadway musicals, containing a total of 12 tracks. The album received a positive reception and marked his first appearance on the main US albums charts, reaching the top 100 listings.

== Background and recording ==
Ed Ames had been a recording artist for RCA Victor since the 1950s, during his time with the Ames Brothers. In 1964, his solo career took off with the debut album Opening Night with Ed Ames, featuring Broadway musical and movie songs. He continued with the format, The Ed Ames Album contained similar tracks. In 1966, Ames recorded another Broadway-themed album, this time titled after the Frank Loesser song "More I Cannot Wish You" and featuring newer songs. The title track itself was from the 1950 musical Guys and Dolls. Like his previous release, the album was produced by Jim Foglesong and recorded at RCA Victor's Studio A, located in New York City, New York.

== Content and release ==
More I Cannot Wish You consisted of 12 tracks in total. All of the tracks came from movies and musicals, with several becoming pop hits. Two selections, "It's Today" and "If She Walked into My Life", originated from the musical Mame, which premiered in 1966. The latter became a success for Eydie Gorme during this time. "The Impossible Dream (The Quest)" from Man of La Mancha, topped the easy listening charts with the version by Jack Jones. Other selections included older show tunes, such as "The Trolley Song", "The Ballad of the Sad Young Men", and "Climb Ev'ry Mountain". More I Cannot Wish You was originally released in September 1966 by RCA Victor. It was the fifth studio album of Ames' career. The label originally offered it as a vinyl LP, with six songs on "Side A" and six songs on "Side B". It was available in stereo and monaural sound. In early 1969, RCA released it on an 8-track cartridge format and retitled the album to The Impossible Dream. Since then, it has been digitized onto streaming platforms in the 2020s as well, being released on a compilation along with his debut album Opening Night with Ed Ames.

== Reception ==
Professional ratings
Review scores
Source	Rating
AllMusic	3/5 stars
The Encyclopedia of Popular Music	3/5 stars

More I Cannot Wish You debuted on Billboard magazine's Top LP's chart in the issue dated November 5, 1966, peaking at No. 90 during a seven-week run on the chart. It became his first charting release. The album briefly entered Cashbox magazine's Top 100 Albums chart in the issue dated December 3, 1966, reaching No. 100. It entered the Record World 100 Top LP's chart in the issue dated December 10, 1966, peaking at No. 91 in January 1967 during a six-week run on the chart.

The album was given a positive review from the Lancaster New Era newspaper upon its release. They described the album as his "best" album yet, and described Ames as "a ruggedly masculine singer with fine musical taste, excellent diction, and beautiful control of his voice." Retrospectively, the album was rated 3 out of 5 stars by both AllMusic and The Encyclopedia of Popular Music, the latter "recommending" it.

== Track listing ==
Side one
No.	Title	Writer(s)	Length
1.	"It's Today"	Jerry Herman	2:22
2.	"I Still See Elisa"	Frederick "Fritz" Loewe; Alan Jay Lerner	2:40
3.	"If She Walked into My Life"	Jerry Herman	4:05
4.	"Rose of Washington Square"	B. G. DeSylva; Joseph F. Hanley	2:57
5.	"More I Cannot Wish You"	Frank Loesser	3:50
6.	"The Impossible Dream (The Quest)"	Joe Darion; Mitch Leigh	2:33
Total length:			18:27

Side two
No.	Title	Writer(s)	Length
1.	"Climb Ev'ry Mountain"	Richard Rodgers; Oscar Hammerstein II	2:25
2.	"The Trolley Song"	Hugh Martin; Ralph Blane	2:35
3.	"The Ballad of the Sad Young Men"	Fran Landesman; Tommy Wolf	4:32
4.	"Cast Your Fate to the Wind"	Vince Guaraldi; Carel Werber	2:34
5.	"Deserted Carousel"	Alec Wilder Brandt; Ruth Haymes	3:39
6.	"Without a Song"	Vincent Youmans; Billy Rose; Edward Eliscu	2:01
Total length:			17:46

== Charts ==
Chart peaks for More I Cannot Wish You
Chart (1966–1967)	Peak position
US Billboard Top LP's	90
US Cashbox Top 100 Albums	100
US Record World 100 Top LP's	91

== Release history ==
Region	Date	Format	Label	Ref.
North America	September 1966	LP Stereo; LP Monaural	RCA Victor Records	
North America	Early 1969	8-track cartridge tape	RCA Victor Records	
Worldwide	Circa 2020	Music download; streaming	Sony Music Entertainment	

== Personnel ==
All credits are adapted from the liner notes of More I Cannot Wish You.

- Ed Ames – vocals
- Frank Hunter, (tracks: A1, A4, B2, B6) – arranger, conductor
- Marty Manning, (tracks: A2, A5, B3, B5) – arranger, conductor
- Sid Bass, (tracks: A3, A6, B1, B4) – arranger, conductor
- Arnold Falleder – liner notes
- Ken Plotin – photography
- Jim Foglesong – producer
- Ed Begley – recording engineer
