= My Kind of Songs =

Studio album by Ed Ames
- Released: June 1965
- Studios: RCA Victor's Music Center of the World, Hollywood, California
- Genre: Traditional pop
- Length: 36:53
- Label: RCA Victor
- Producer: Jim Foglesong

Ed Ames chronology
The Ed Ames Album (1964)	My Kind of Songs (1965)	It's a Man's World (1966)

My Kind of Songs is a studio album by American singer and actor Ed Ames. It was released in June 1965 via RCA Victor and contained 12 tracks. It was the third studio album of Ames' career, featuring interpretations of traditional pop standards and some songs from Broadway musicals. It also featured covers of popular recordings from several decades. Upon release, it received a positive review from Billboard magazine editors.

== Background, recording and content ==
Ed Ames had been on the RCA Victor label since his time with The Ames Brothers vocal group. He later found success with "Try To Remember" in late 1964, which marked his first chart entry. RCA issued thirty albums of Ames' recordings through 1972. Among them was My Kind of Songs. The project was recorded during three sessions in RCA Victor's Music Center of the World, located in Hollywood, California. It was produced by Jim Foglesong, who had been serving as Ames' record producer for several albums. Marty Manning is credited with the arrangements.

The album contained 12 tracks. Included were covers of "Softly, as I Leave You", "Waltz for Debby", "Maybe You'll Be There" and "I'm Gettin' Sentimental Over You", "Inch Worm" and "I Can't Help It (If I'm Still in Love with You)". These songs had previously been included in Broadway musicals or had been singles that appeared on America's Billboard pop music chart. "A Married Man" was a new track, coming from the concurrently opened musical Baker Street.

== Release and reception ==
My Kind of Songs was originally released by RCA Victor in June 1965. It was distributed as a vinyl LP, featuring six songs on "Side A" and six songs on "Side B". It was available in stereo and monaural sound. It was Ames' third solo studio album. It is Ames' only album not to be re-released digitally.

The album received a positive review from Billboard magazine following its release. The publication called it a "well-chosen and balanced program of semi-standard and standard material interpreted by Ames' warm phrasing," stating, "Arrangements of Marty Manning and Ames' sensitive interpretations bring freshness to 'Maybe You'll Be There,' 'Inch Worm' and 'When the World Was Young.' They also highlighted Leroy Anderson and Mitchell Parish's "Forgotten Dreams" calling it a "standout".

The Virgin Encyclopedia of Popular Music gave the album a three-star rating, meaning it was of "good by the artist's usual standards," and "therefore recommended."

== Track listing ==
Side one
No.	Title	Writer(s)	Length
1.	"Maybe You'll Be There"	Rube Bloom; Sammy Gallop	3:01
2.	"Forgotten Dreams"	Leroy Anderson; Mitchell Parish	2:45
3.	"Let Me (Deixa)"	Baden Powell de Aquino; Norman Gimbel	2:32
4.	"Inch Worm"	Frank Loesser	2:58
5.	"Softly, as I Leave You"	Giorgio Calabrese; Antonio De Vita; Hal Shaper	3:13
6.	"Put On a Happy Face"	Charles Strouse; Lee Adams	2:10
Total length:			16:39

Side two
No.	Title	Writer(s)	Length
1.	"I Can't Help It (If I'm Still in Love with You)"	Hank Williams	2:53
2.	"A Married Man"	Marian Grudeff; Raymond Jessel	3:45
3.	"Waltz for Debby"	Bill Evans; Gene Lees	3:05
4.	"I'm Gettin' Sentimental Over You"	George Bassman; Ned Washington	2:50
5.	"One Hand, One Heart"	Leonard Bernstein; Stephen Sondheim	2:16
6.	"(Ah, the Apple Trees) When the World Was Young"	Johnny Mercer; Philippe-Gérard	5:25
Total length:			20:14

== Personnel ==
All credits are adapted from the liner notes of My Kind of Songs.

- Marty Manning – arranger, conductor
- Dave Hassinger – recording engineer
- Harvey Siders – liner notes
- Jim Foglesong – producer
- Ed Ames – vocals
