= Elizabeth Diggs =

American playwright and television writer

- Born: 6 August 1939 (age 87); Tulsa, Oklahoma
- Education: Brown University
- Occupation: Playwright
- Writing career
- Notable works: Close Ties; Mirette; Goodbye Freddy

Elizabeth Diggs is an American playwright. She is a member of Ensemble Studio Theatre.

== Early life and education ==
Born in Tulsa, Oklahoma in 1939 to attorney James B. Diggs and Virginia Francis Diggs, Diggs attended Brown University, where she first became involved with theatre. In 1960 she co-wrote Happily Never After, the annual Brownbrokers musical, with future partner Emily Arnold McCully. She graduated in 1961. After Brown, she earned a PhD from Columbia University and entered a period of political activism in the anti-war and feminism movements, including the distinction of heading one of the first Women's Studies programs at Jersey City College, where she co-developed curriculum and oversaw the launch and expansion of the program. She is a professor of dramatic writing at the Goldberg Department of Dramatic Writing at Tisch.

== Career ==
Diggs' first major success was the play Close Ties, which premiered at Lexington Conservatory Theatre in August 1980. The play starred notable stage actress Margaret Barker, Sofia Landon Geier and John Griesemer. It was directed by Barbara Rosoff. "A remarkable production of a lovely and loving play," said critic Jeffery Borak. The Knickerbocker News described it as "...beautiful, touching, gentle and heartwarming." A year later it was produced at Long Wharf Theatre, directed by Arvin Brown and once again starring Barker; the actress had been friends with Diggs for several years, and the author crafted the role with Barker in mind. In 1983, it was made into a television film.

Her next play, Goodbye Freddy, was workshopped at Lexington Conservatory Theatre, followed by its world premiere production at South Coast Repertory in 1983. Diggs won the CBS Dramatists Guild Prize for the play that May. The play was produced at Portland Stage Company in December 1984, starring fellow Lexington Conservatory alumni Court Miller and Kit Flanagan, and directed by another alumni, Barbara Rosoff. The production of Goodbye Freddy was later remounted in New York on September 20, 1985, starring Barbara Eda-Young and Michael Murphy in place of Court Miller, along with Walter Bobbie, Carole Monferdini, Nicholas Cortland and Kit Flanagan."As she demonstrated in Close Ties and the one-act Dumping Grounds, the playwright has a keen ear for dialogue and a watchful eye for those offhanded moments when characters accidentally reveal themselves," said New York Times critic Mel Gussow.

American Beef, her third play, explores the dying myths of the American west, and was inspired by childhood visits to the Chapman-Barnard Ranch in Osage County, Oklahoma. It was commissioned in 1985 for South Coast Repertory. Productions include 1987 world premiere at Gloucester Stage Company in Massachusetts followed by International City Theater in Long Beach, California.

In October 1988, she premiered Saint Florence at Capital Repertory Theatre in Albany, NY, after a staged reading of it there in May. "Both an instructive lesson from history and a compelling act of the imagination," said the review of the premiere in the New York Times. Based on the life of Florence Nightingale, the production starred Claire Beckman. In 1990, it was produced at the Vineyard Theatre in New York. Re-titled Nightingale it was directed by John Rubinstein with Kathryn Pogson in the starring role.

In 1996, she collaborated with composer Harvey Schmidt and lyricist Tom Jones, writing the book for the musical Mirette based on Emily Arnold McCully's Caldecott award-winning children's book Mirette on the High Wire. It opened in August 1996 at the Norma Terris Theatre and later moved to the Goodspeed Opera House.

Diggs also contributed to the first season of television series St. Elsewhere. Although writing for television was lucrative, she found the experience less fulfilling than theatre.

== Personal life ==
Her daughter, with director Will Mackenzie, is documentary filmmaker Jenny Mackenzie. She lives in Chatham with her partner, author Emily Arnold McCully.

== List of plays ==
=== Feature length ===
- Close Ties
- Goodbye Freddy
- Nightingale
- American Beef
- Grant & Twain
- Custer's Luck
- Glory Girls
- Mirette

=== One-act plays ===
- Dumping Ground

== Awards and honours ==
- National Endowment for the Arts grant, for the premiere production of Saint Florence, 1983
- CBS/Dramatists Guild Prize for the writing of Goodbye Freddy, 1983
- Runner-up, Susan Smith Blackburn Prize for the writing of Saint Florence, 1987
- Guggenheim Fellowship award, for exceptional creativity in the field of dramatic arts, 1988
- Kennedy Center for the Arts grant for the premiere production of Saint Florence, 1988
- Theatre Communications Group Edgerton Foundation Award for New Plays, for development of Grant & Twain, 2013
