= The Fantasticks (film) =

- Theatrical release poster
- Directed by: Michael Ritchie
- Screenplay by: Tom Jones; Harvey Schmidt
- Based on: The Fantasticks by: Tom Jones; Harvey Schmidt
- Produced by: Michael Ritchie; Linne Radmin
- Starring: Joel Grey; Barnard Hughes; Jean Louisa Kelly; Joe McIntyre; Jonathon Morris; Brad Sullivan; Teller
- Cinematography: Fred Murphy
- Edited by: William S. Scharf
- Music by: Harvey Schmidt
- Production company: United Artists
- Distributed by: MGM Distribution Co. (United States and Canada); United International Pictures (International)
- Release date: September 2000 (limited)
- Running time: 86 minutes; (Edited cut); 109 minutes; (Original cut)
- Country: United States
- Language: English
- Budget: $10 million
- Box office: $49,666

The Fantasticks is a 1995 American romantic comedy musical film film not released until 2000, directed by filmmaker Michael Ritchie. It was the last Ritchie film to be released before his death the following year. The screenplay by writers Harvey Schmidt and Tom Jones is based on their record-breaking production of the musical The Fantasticks, which ran for 17,162 performances (and which was subsequently revived Off-Broadway).

Though it was made in 1995, the film did not see a proper (though very limited) release until 2000 in an thoroughly edited form.

The film received mixed reviews from critics.

== Plot ==
Amos Babcock Bellamy and Ben Hucklebee scheme to get their respective children, Luisa and Matt, to fall in love. Knowing they will resist their fathers' interference, the two men use reverse psychology and fabricate a feud, building a wall between their houses and forbidding their children to speak to each other. When their plan works, they enlist the aid of El Gallo, the proprietor of a traveling carnival, to put an end to their supposed disagreement in a manner which will not reveal their deception.

El Gallo pretends to kidnap Luisa with the help of his troupe, which includes elderly Shakespearean actor Henry Albertson and his mute sidekick Mortimer, and arranges for Matt to rescue her. The couple settles into what they anticipate will be domestic bliss, but through the eyes of El Gallo and company they see the harsh realities of the world, and their innocent romanticism is replaced by a more mature understanding of love.

== Cast ==
- Joel Grey as Amos Babcock Bellamy
- Barnard Hughes as Henry Albertson
- Jean Louisa Kelly as Luisa Bellamy
- Joe McIntyre as Matt Hucklebee
- Jonathon Morris as El Gallo
- Brad Sullivan as Ben Hucklebee
- Teller as Mortimer
- Charles Hallahan as Sheriff
- Arturo Gil as The Bavarian Baby
- Joe Anthony Cox as His Assistant

== Soundtrack ==
1. "Much More" - Luisa
2. "Never Say No" - Hucklebee, Bellamy
3. "Metaphor" - Matt, Luisa
4. "The Abduction Song" - El Gallo, Hucklebee, Bellamy
5. "Soon It's Gonna Rain" - Luisa, Matt
6. "Happy Ending" - Hucklebee, Benllamy, Luisa, Matt
7. "This Plum Is Too Ripe" - Luisa, Matt, Huckleebee, Bellamy
8. "I Can See It" - Matt, El Gallo
9. "'Round and 'Round" - El Gallo, Luisa
10. "They Were You" - Matt, Luisa
11. "Try to Remember" - El Gallo

== Production ==
The film was a pet project of Michael Ritchie's, having been a huge fan of the original stage production. The theatrical production traditionally is performed on a bare stage with two-piece musical accompaniment, while the film adaptation transposed the action to the farm country of the 1920s American West, affecting a look similar to Oklahoma!, and most of the songs were rearranged for a full orchestra. Additionally, the songs were performed live by the actors, rather than dubbed in afterwards, as is the usual practice with a musical film.

The film was completed in 1995 and scheduled for a Thanksgiving release, but executives at Metro-Goldwyn-Mayer, discouraged by indifferent preview audience response, lost faith in the project and shelved it. Due to a contractual obligation to Tom Jones and Harvey Schmidt to give the film a theatrical release, MGM board of directors member Francis Ford Coppola decided to trim the film from its original 109 minute length to 86 minutes, and the abridged version finally was released in four theaters in September 2000.

Ritchie's original, 109-minute version was finally released as part of Twilight Time's limited 2015 Blu-ray release, as a standard-definition "special feature". No high-definition transfer of the original cut currently exists at MGM.

== Reception ==
=== Box office ===
The new cut grossed only $49,666 in the US.

=== Critical ===
The film received lackluster reviews, with a divisive 50% "rotten" rating on Rotten Tomatoes from 24 critics. Metacritic, which uses a weighted average, assigned the film a score of 48 out of 100, based on 15 critics, indicating "mixed or average" reviews.

In his review in The New York Times, A. O. Scott wrote that the film "wobbles between the timeless and the anachronistic. For all its robust good cheer it's a timid and uncertain creature...what looks like magic on stage can seem manic by the light of the screen. Live theater can tolerate outsize gestures, rickety sets and willful illusionism more easily than film, which is a stubbornly literal-minded medium...The Fantasticks is, at bottom, a tribute to the transformative power of theater, and the theater is where it should have been allowed to remain. The movie version overflows with affection and good intention, but unwittingly turns a bauble of cheerful fakery into something that mostly feels phony."

Scott Foundas of Variety called the film "little more than a curio, notable more for its lavish, labored efforts to revive the old-fashioned movie musical than for its success at reimagining the intimate tuner for the big screen...The Fantasticks is hampered almost from the start by the distinct lack of chemistry between McIntyre and Kelly as well as by McIntyre's seeming inability to alter his expression from that of perpetual, wide-eyed bewilderment. Kelly acquits herself more adequately as a singer than does McIntyre. But neither performer ever seems truly in thrall of the various fanciful goings-on...while the film is inarguably Ritchie's most visually adventuresome since Downhill Racer 30 years ago, the songs and performers seem overwhelmed by the sheer vastness of the visual design. The relative claustrophobia of the carnival set is the film's greatest aesthetic strength, the big skies of big-sky country its greatest weakness, wherein the private dreaminess of the text seems to evaporate. The attempt to make a film of The Fantasticks that would function as the same playful homage to movie musicals that the play itself is to musical theater is admirable, but the resulting film is one of too much reverence and not enough satire."

In the San Francisco Chronicle, Edward Guthmann wrote "The Fantasticks doesn't try to reinvent the screen musical, as Cabaret did in 1972, but revives the conventions of the '50s, when big-screen musicals were opened up for wide-screen formats and actors still broke spontaneously into song...[it] has slow patches and requires a generous suspension of disbelief. But it's also sweet and optimistic - a welcome antidote to gloom."

Kevin Thomas of the Los Angeles Times called it "pure enchantment that emerges as an inspired transposition of a musical to the screen - one that manages to honor the theatricality of the source yet becomes a fully cinematic experience...[it] is a gem, but so virtually extinct is the screen musical that the looming question remains as to whether people will care. It's one thing to pack Manhattan's small Sullivan Street Playhouse with The Fantasticks decade after decade, and quite another to pull crowds with gossamer, lyrical make-believe to the country's multiplexes."

Peter Travers of Rolling Stone wrote "It was folly for Ritchie to shoot a spare theatrical piece against the sweeping landscapes of the Arizona prairie. But the folly sometimes pays off. Joe McIntyre, of New Kids on the Block, and Jean Louisa Kelly catch just the right note of youthful yearning in their voices...even as the movie threatens to derail, the charm of the score...keeps breaking through."

TV Guide wrote "While the cast and songs are top notch, the predictability of the madness makes it pretty clear that this musical shouldn't have left the stage."
