= The Windmills of Your Mind (Ed Ames album) =

Studio album by Ed Ames
- Released: May 1969
- Studios: RCA's Music Center of the World, Hollywood, California
- Genres: Pop; Easy listening
- Label: RCA Victor
- Producer: Jim Foglesong

Ed Ames chronology
A Time for Living, a Time for Hope (1969)	The Windmills of Your Mind (1969)	The Best of Ed Ames (1969)

Singles from The Windmills of Your Mind
- 1. "Son of a Travelin' Man" Released: April 1969

The Windmills of Your Mind is a studio album by American pop singer Ed Ames. It was released in June 1969 via RCA Victor and was the fourteenth studio album of his career. The Windmills of Your Mind, titled after the 1968 hit song "The Windmills of Your Mind", contained 11 tracks, including the lead single "Son of a Travelin' Man". It reached the top-25 of the US Billboard Easy Listening chart, and was his final Billboard Hot 100 and Australian Top Singles entry. The album received highly positive reviews from several contemporary publications and reached the charts. However, its performance on them varied. While reaching No. 72 on the charts published Cashbox and Record World, on the survey by Billboard it only peaked at No. 157.

== Recording and release ==
The songs for The Windmills of Your Mind were recorded at RCA's Music Center of the World, located in Hollywood, California. All of them were produced by Jim Foglesong. Arrangements were provided by a total of five conductors, these include Jimmie Haskell, Artie Butler, and Perry Botkin Jr.. The Windmills of Your Mind was originally pushed by RCA Victor in June 1969 as part of a group of fifteen albums issued by the label that month, but mentions of the album being already available date back to early as May of that year. It was the fourteenth studio album of Ames's career, and also the second of the year. The label originally offered it as a vinyl LP, with six songs on "Side A" and five songs on "Side B". It was made available as an 8-track cartridge in July 1969 as well. Decades later, the album was re-released for streaming to digital sites.

== Critical reception ==
Billboard magazine stated that "The new image of Ed Ames is physical; artistically, fans will still enjoy that full, precise voice," adding, "But he presents for their pleasure some fairly hip tunes." Record World stated that "Lots of sweet singing from Ed Ames, whose albums never fail to please." The magazine believed that "He knows how to mix the old with the new." The Anaheim Bellutein stated that "every album by Ames seems just a bit better than the previous," but said that "the Ames touch on The Windmills of Your Mind may never be surpassed". The publication put the album as their first choice of "Album of the Week." Cashbox magazine highlighted the tracks "Sittin' On the Dock Of The Bay," "Happy Heart," "Traces," "Proud Mary," "Feelings," and "The Windmills Of Your Mind", writing that "they're some of the hits that receive the smooth Ames rendition."

== Chart performance and singles ==
The Windmills of Your Mind successfully reached the US pop album charts, though its presence on them varied. It debuted on Billboard magazine's Top LP's chart in the issue dated July 5, 1969, peaking at No. 157 during a six-week run on the chart. The album debuted on Cashbox magazine's Top 100 Albums chart in the issue also dated July 5, 1969, peaking at No. 72 during a six-week run on it. The album entered the Record World 100 Top LP's chart in the issue dated July 12, 1969, reaching No. 72 during a seven-week run on it.

One lead single was included on The Windmills of Your Mind. "Son of a Travelin' Man" was first released by RCA Victor as a single in April 1969. It became a top-25 single on America's Billboard adult contemporary chart, rising to the number 21 position. The single spent four weeks on the Billboard Hot 100 chart, peaking at number 92 and becoming his final entry on it. In Canadian RPM Pop singles surveys the single reached the number 81 position, whilst peaking at a higher number 14 on their Adult Contemporary chart.

== Track listing ==
Side one
No.	Title	Writer(s)	Length
1.	"I Just Can't Help Believin'"	Barry Mann; Cynthia Weil	2:19
2.	"(Sittin' On) The Dock of the Bay"	Steve Cropper; Otis Redding	2:52
3.	"Happy Heart"	James Last; Jackie Rae	2:35
4.	"To Say Goodbye to Anne"	Martin Cooper	2:37
5.	"Traces"	Buddy Buie; J. R. Cobb; Emory Gordy Jr.	2:54
6.	"If I Ever Get to Saginaw Again"	Keller; Bob Russell	2:35

Side two
No.	Title	Writer(s)	Length
1.	"The Windmills of Your Mind" (from The Thomas Crown Affair)	Michel Legrand; Alan and Marilyn Bergman	2:32
2.	"Proud Mary"	John Fogerty	2:47
3.	"Feelings"	Barry Mann; Cynthia Weil	2:36
4.	"I'll Stay Lonely"	Jones; Green	2:18
5.	"Son of a Travelin' Man"	Mauro Lusini; Robert I. Allen	2:45

== Charts ==
Chart peaks for The Windmills of Your Mind
Chart (1969)	Peak position
US Billboard Top LP's	157
US Cashbox Top 100 Albums	72
US Record World 100 Top LP's	72

== Personnel ==
All credits are adapted from the liner notes of The Windmills of Your Mind.

- Ed Ames – vocals
- Jim Foglesong – producer
- Artie Butler, (tracks: A3, B2, B5) – arranger, conductor
- George Tipton, (tracks: A6) – arranger, conductor
- Jimmie Haskell, (tracks: A2, A5, B1) – arranger, conductor
- Perry Botkin, Jr., (tracks: A1, A4, B3, B4), – arranger, conductor
- Mike Salisbury – design
- Grover Helsley – recording engineer
- Mickey Crofford – recording engineer
- Guy Webster – photograph
