= Anatol (play) =

1893 play by Arthur Schnitzler

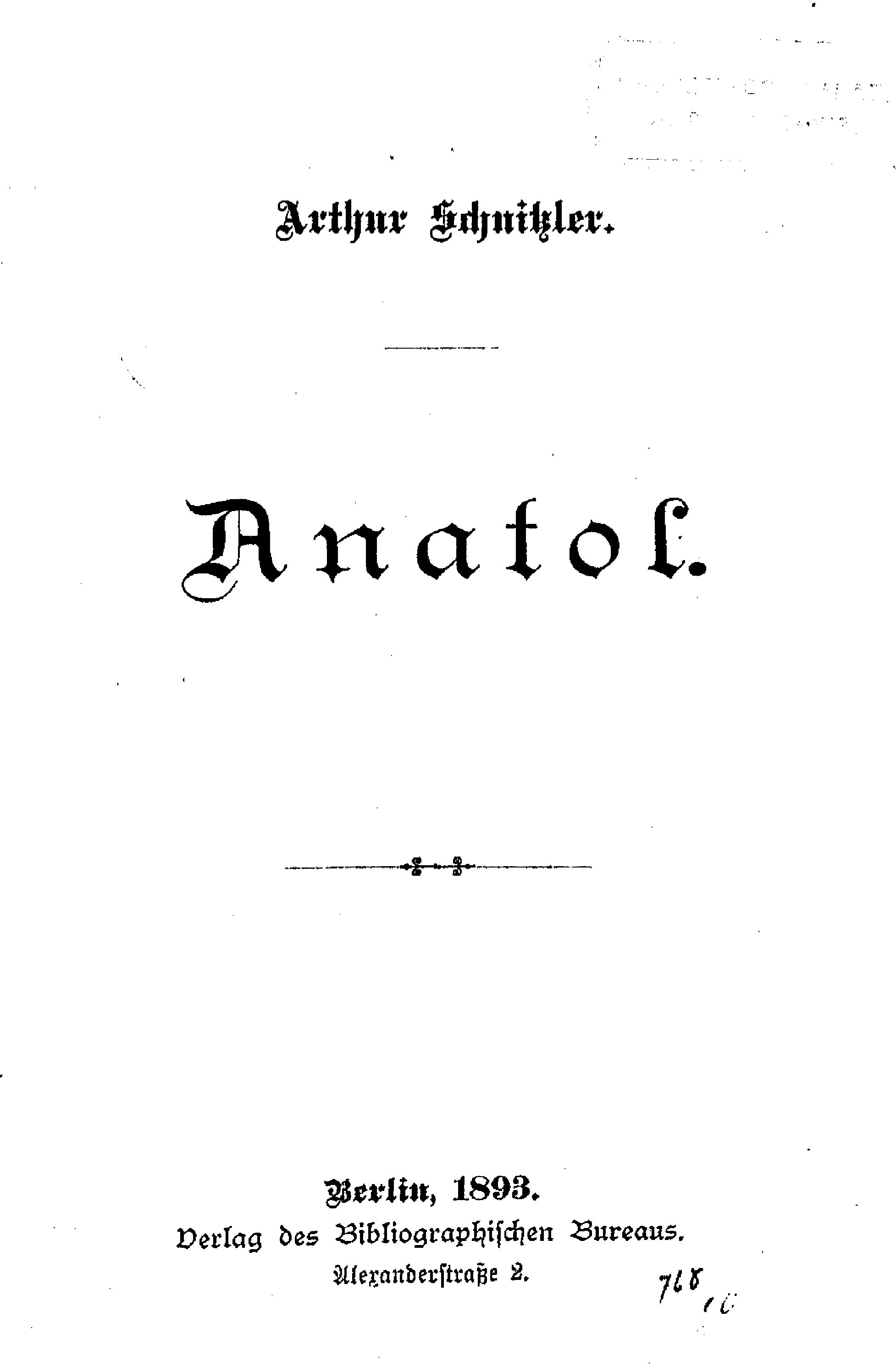
- Original language: German
- Written by: Arthur Schnitzler
- Characters: Anatol, Max, Cora, Gabriele, Bianca, Emilie, Annie, Else, Ilona
- Setting: Vienna, late 19th century

Premiere
- Date: 1910
- Place: Vienna, Austria-Hungary

Anatol is a play by Austrian playwright Arthur Schnitzler, published in 1893. The introduction was written by Loris, a pseudonym of the young Hugo von Hofmannsthal, who was a friend of Schnitzler. It is a seven-act play set in late 19th century Vienna, depicting the many shallow and immature relationships of bourgeois playboy Anatol. The first act, Die Frage an das Schicksal ("The question to fate"), earned Schnitzler the title of Psychologischer Tiefenforscher ("psychological depth researcher") from Sigmund Freud.

== Plot ==
=== The question to fate ===
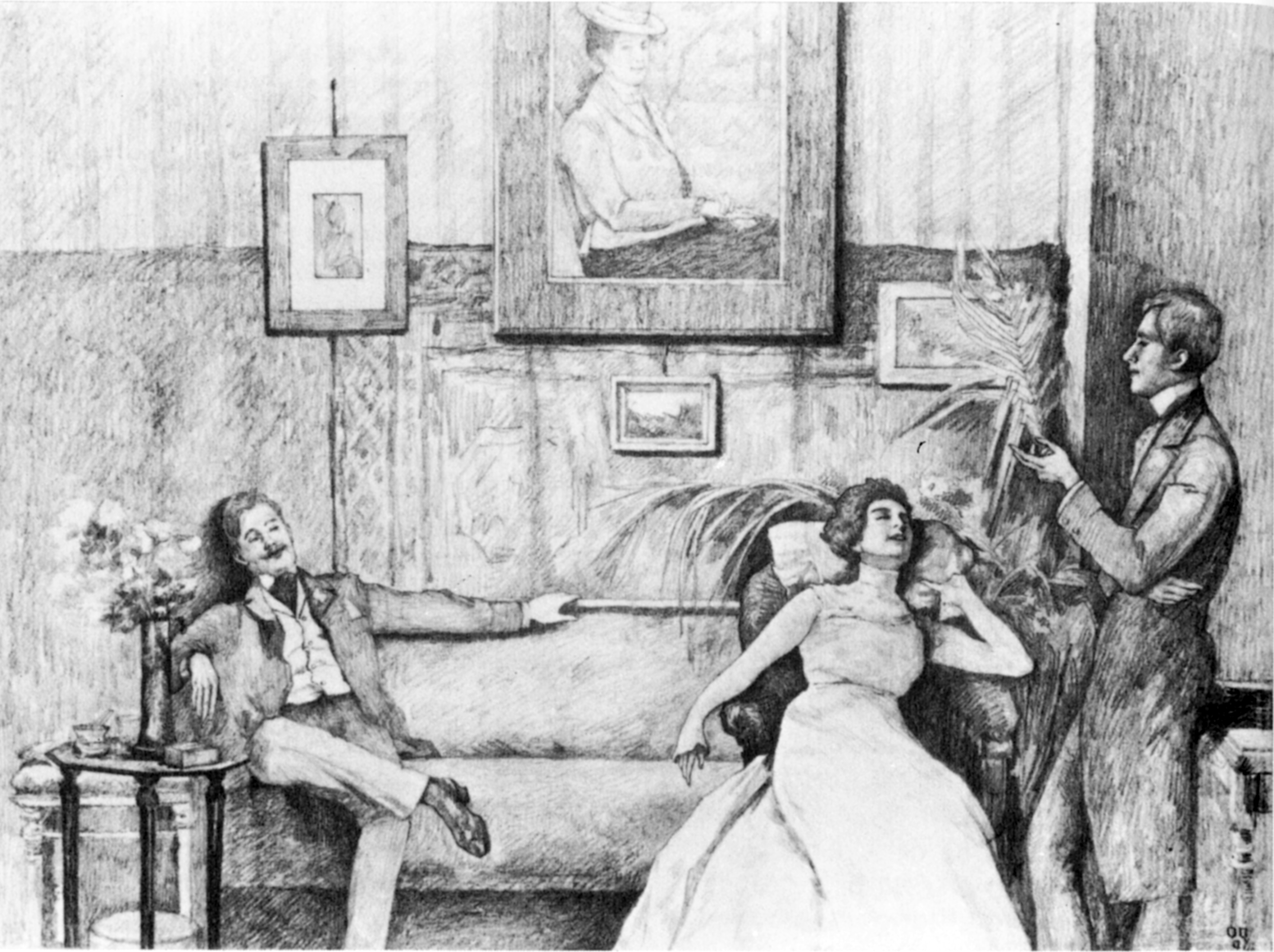
Cora in hypnois. Pencil drawing by Moritz Coschell, 1899

With his friend Max, Anatol discusses the problem that a man never can know for sure whether or not a woman is faithful to him. He argues that, irrespective of love, women by their very nature can never be true. He also suspects his current lover Cora of infidelity. The constant uncertainty, against which he believes there is no recourse, almost drives him crazy. Max suggests that Anatol try hypnosis. Anatol takes up this suggestion enthusiastically, as it offers him the opportunity to finally dispel his doubts. As soon as he makes the decision to try hypnosis, he has the opportunity to try it out, for Cora comes home just then. He asks Cora if she is willing to be hypnotized by him, and she says she is happy to comply with his request. Anatol hypnotizes Cora and asks her if she loves him; she replies, "Yes!". Encouraged by this success, Anatol now wants to address the question of fidelity, but it is apparent that he still fears the truth and would rather be tortured by doubt than face an unpleasant truth which could hurt his pride. No matter how his friend Max words the question, "Are you faithful to me?", Anatol objects to the formulation of the question, the clarity and intelligibility of the question, finally even doubting the possibility of the existence of an answer, just to avoid having to ask. When Max finally points out to the unnerved Anatol that all his objections are nonsensical and contrived, he eventually decides that he wants to ask his lover, but not in the presence of Max – whom he sends out of the door. When alone with Cora, he is overwhelmed by his feelings and wakes her up, without having asked his question. Thus Anatol gambles away his opportunity to have "the question to fate" answered, and Cora playfully makes it clear that she will never let Anatol hypnotize her again.

=== Christmas shopping ===
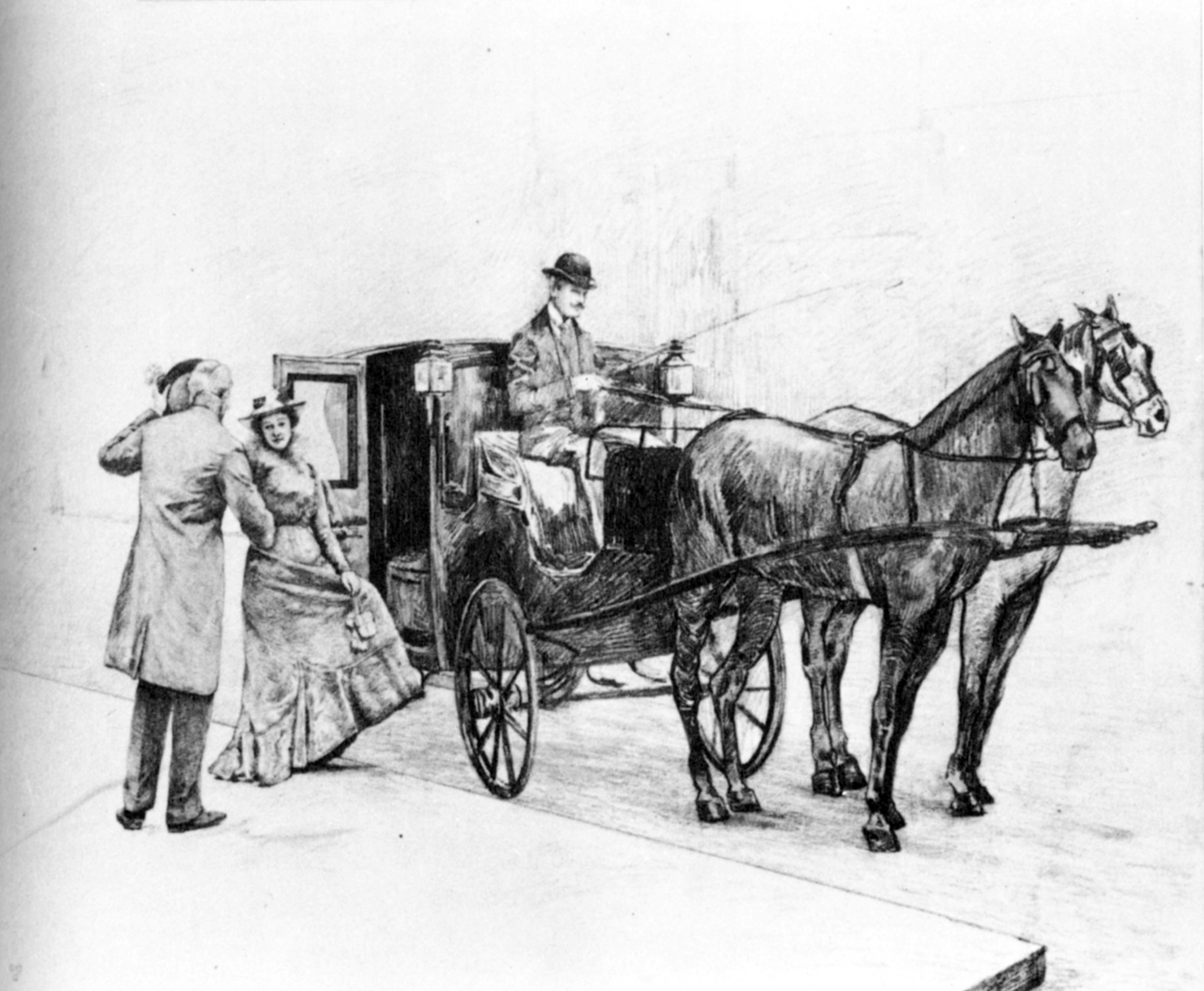
Anatol says goodbye to Gabriele. Pencil drawing by Moritz Coschell, 1899

It is Christmas Eve, just before gift giving. Anatol is in the city, looking for a gift for his current lover, when he meets Gabriele. In the course of the conversation between the two it becomes apparent that Gabriele is a former lover of Anatol, who probably eventually left him and now has a husband and children of her own. When she learns that Anatol is looking for a gift for his current lover, she offers to help him, a proposal Anatol gladly accepts. On learning that Anatol's "sweet girl" is a woman from the suburbs and thus belongs to a lower social class, her sympathy soon turns to ridicule.

The conversation which now develops between Gabriele and Anatol illustrates the contrast between the artificial, noncommittal life of the bourgeoisie in the city of Vienna to the simple, natural life in the suburbs. Gabriele, a product of the "big world", looks down with contempt on the "small world", in which Anatol takes refuge through his relationship. The reason for this escape is his longing for solid values such as truth and pure love that he could not find in the "big world" with its noncommittal flirtation.

However, Anatol realizes that this life in the "small world" is only a temporary paradise; he himself is rooted entirely in the glittering, unstable "big world", and he himself is a master of noncommital flirtation. As an actor in life, like his contemporaries, he only yearns for the "small world", without ultimately leaving the "big world". Therefore, when Gabriele asks whether he was "everything" to this girl in the "small world", he replies: "Maybe... today".

Anatol is unable to bond with the girl and the solid values of the "small world" he so longs for; he remains an enigmatic adventurer who is not interested in eventually settling down. But Gabriele feels stimulated by Anatol's longing for the "small world" of his lover and becomes thoughtful, yearning for her own distant "enchanted garden". She gives him a bouquet of flowers for his new lady love, saying she "perhaps could have loved just as well as her, but did not have the courage to do so".

=== Episode ===
Anatol brings Max a box with many small packages of letters and memorabilia, as he is about to go to the countryside, leaving everything behind in order to "organize" his life anew. Each package contains a little poem, a flower, a lock of hair, or something else about the sender – as memorabilia – these are from Anatol's previous lovers. Amused, Max goes through this box and finds a package labeled "episode". This is a reminder of Bianca, a circus performer, with whom Anatol spent two romantic evening hours several years ago, which he remembers as intense hours of deepest insight into the nature of "love" – Anatol believes no one before or after loved him as much, while to him, aware of the fleeting nature of the evening, the "episode" already seemed a memory while he was experiencing it. Almost pitifully, yet romantically transfigured, he remembers the intensity of her feelings for him and believes himself to be a true "wizard of love", who, by evoking the right "mood" at any time, "can feel, where [all others] – can only [enjoy]!". An amused Max hears his friend out, but argues that Anatol cannot be certain of what Bianca felt that evening. Max knew Bianca very well – better than his friend did because his interest in her was of a more rational nature – and argues that to her Anatol was just one of many lovers. Anatol has hardly finished his recountal when Bianca, who is on tour again in the city, presents herself at Max's place. Thrilled by the idea of meeting the "muse" of his perfect reminiscence and to have his beliefs about Bianca's feelings confirmed, he hides before she enters. But when he ventures out, his hopes are dashed – Bianca does not recognize him, and feeling hurt, he leaves the house. Taking revenge for his friend, Max initially denies Bianca the familiar conversational tone of the old days, throws the package labeled "episode" into the fire and only slowly lets himself be drawn into a conversation about Bianca's recent adventures.

=== Keepsake gemstones ===
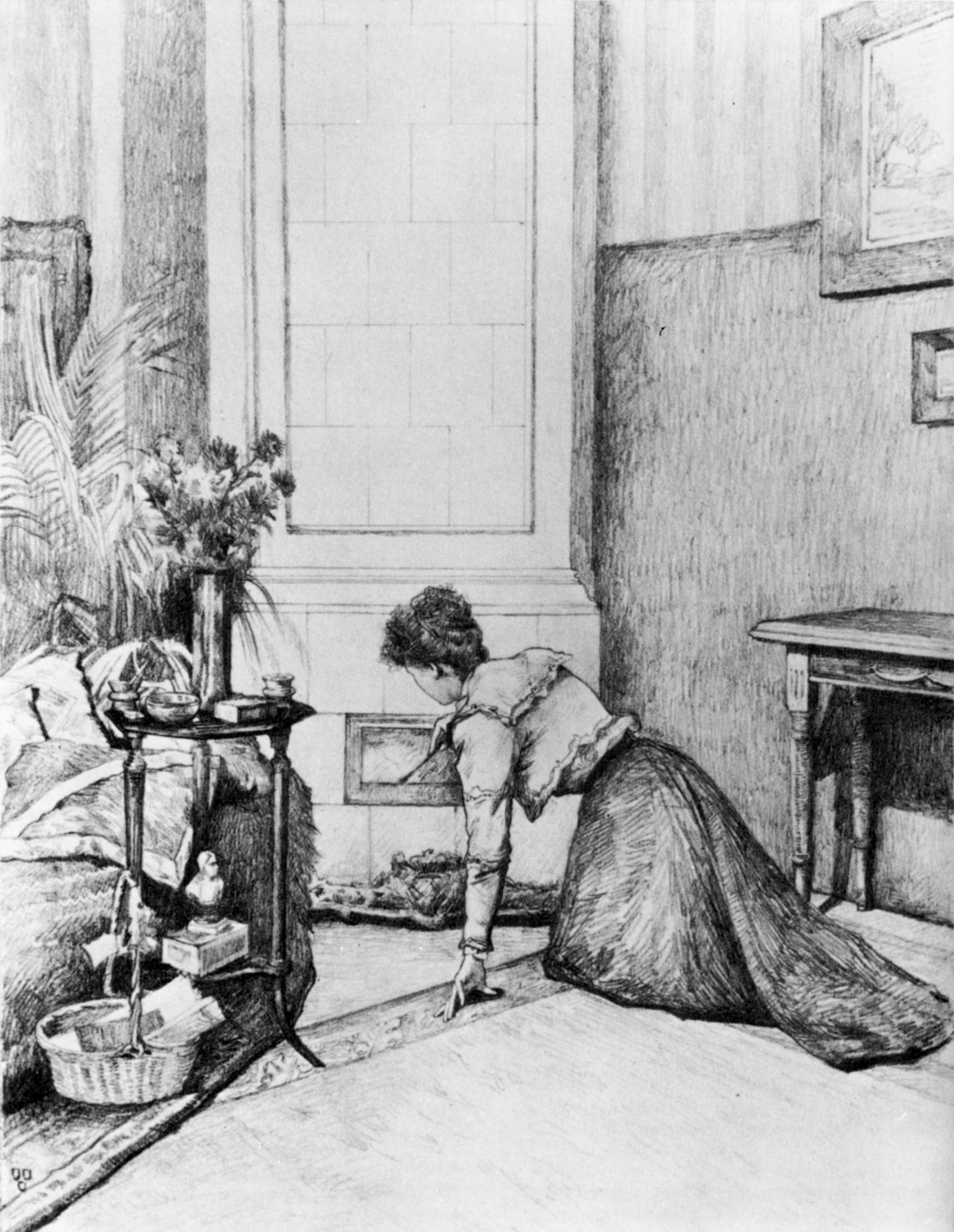
Emilie in front of the fireplace. Pencil drawing by Moritz Coschell, 1899

Anatol browses through Emilie's desk and finds a red ruby and a black diamond. She has kept these, even though the two of them had destroyed all memorabilia from their previous dalliances. He questions her, and she says the ruby was from her mother's necklace, a necklace she was wearing when she lost her virginity. He then asks her why she has kept the other, black, gem. She replies it is because it is worth a quarter million. He throws the diamond into the fire, and she tries all means to retrieve it from the fire. Anatol leaves the room, saying, "whore".

=== Farewell supper ===
Anatol wants to end his relationship with Annie and meets up with Max in a restaurant. Meanwhile, he has been with another woman, who is much more modest than Annie. Anatol and Annie had made a pact that they would end their relationship before they cheat. Annie comes to the restaurant and wants to end their relationship. Anatol tells her of his relationship with the other woman in order to make it look as if it was he who ended the relationship. Incensed, Annie leaves the restaurant.

=== Agony ===
Anatol and Max are in Anatol's apartment. Max leaves the house. Else comes in a little later to see Anatol. Else is married and cheating on her husband with Anatol. Anatol wants her to be with him, and to elope with him. However, Else does not want to do that and has to go back. She comforts him and puts him off until the next day.

=== Anatol's wedding morning ===
Anatol is going to get married and has celebrated his bachelor party the day before. Ilona is still in bed. At first he tells her he is going out with friends and she cannot come with him. Then he confesses, however, that he is going to a wedding. Anatol leaves the house and goes to his wedding. Ilona swears revenge, but Max calms her down.

== Interpretation and analysis ==
Anatol outwardly looks like a happy person with many liaisons. However, on a closer look, it becomes apparent that he is driven by fear of intimacy and cannot commit to a real partnership. Womanizing is not a positive trait, and causes inability to relate and fear of infidelity. Male pride is hurt many times in this play and influences Anatol's thinking and actions.

Overall, the change in the nature of Anatol's relationships with women from act to act in this play is striking. In the first act, he effectively has the opportunity to get an answer to a "question to fate", to discover the truth. His lover is hypnotized, and in a sense Anatol is actually the "god" he feels he is: The power of knowledge is given to him. The responsibility for not using the power lies solely with him; he does not dare to ask the question, out of pride and because "imagination is a thousand times more important than the truth". This quasi-almighty position Anatol assumes changes more and more in later acts – in the "Episodes" act he isn't remembered, while in the "Farewell supper" act Annie resists Anatol's attempt to enforce his position as the person with the sole right to determine the future of their relationship. In the "Wedding Morning" act, the initial position of the protagonist turns completely into its opposite: Anatol is completely at the mercy of his lover, who could ruin the planned wedding, and could thus completely sabotage Anatol's life plans – however cursory – and Anatol cannot say or do anything to resolve the crisis. Significantly, it is not Anatol who resolves the crisis – Max has to help and bring the situation under control for Anatol. However, after this act, Max finally leaves the stage with an "Oh!".

In the first act, Anatol wants to hypnotize Cora to find out if she has been unfaithful to him. However, he is afraid of the truth and aborts the hypnosis. Anatol thus suppresses his fears, which according to Sigmund Freud can displace them into the unconscious. This usually leads to neuroses and psychoses. Maybe Max is the real womanizer in this play, but he does not tell.

=== Anatol's megalomania ===
Anatols Größenwahn ("Anatol's megalomania") was supposed to be the final act of Anatol, but was then replaced by "Anatol's wedding morning". It shows Anatol as an old man who still has not achieved more in life. This final act was never published, but was performed in 1932. This act is included in The Game of Love, the musical adaptation of the play in English.

=== Prologue ===
The prologue is supposed to represent the mood that prevails in Anatol. This is the shallowness and superficiality of the world as a stage in which the people play act before each other.

== Adaptation as English musical ==
Anatol has been adapted in English as the musical The Game of Love, based on the translation of the play by Tom Jones. The lyrics are written by Jones, and the music is by Jacques Offenbach, with musical arrangements and additional music by Nancy Ford.

It was also adapted into the successful American musical, The Gay Life, with songs by Arthur Schwartz and Howard Dietz

== Film adaptation ==
- The Affairs of Anatol (1921)
