= Son of a Travelin' Man =

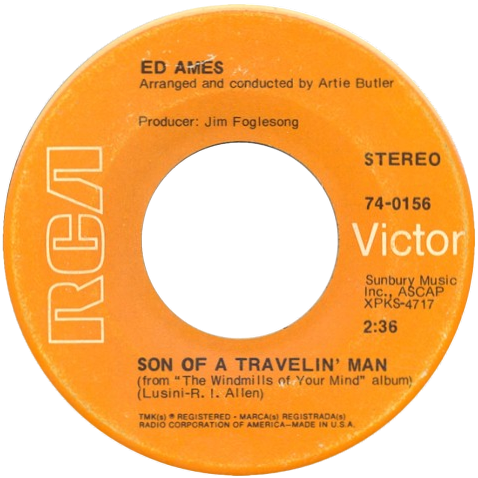

Single by Ed Ames

from the album The Windmills of Your Mind
- B-side: "2001"
- Released: April 1969
- Studio: RCA's Music Center of the World, Hollywood, California
- Genre: Pop; easy listening
- Length: 2:36
- Label: RCA Victor Records
- Songwriters: Mauro Lusini and Robert Allen
- Producer: Jim Foglesong

Ed Ames singles chronology
"Changing, Changing" (1969)	"Son of a Travelin' Man" (1969)	"Think Summer" (1969)

"Son of a Travelin' Man" is a 1969 song written by Mauro Lusini (it) and Robert Allen. It was most notably performed by Ed Ames, who released it as a single in early 1969. His version reached the US and Canadian pop charts, but saw much bigger success on the adult-oriented charts in both countries.

== Content ==
The song is about a perpetual traveler's ports of call, from major American cities like Seattle, Savannah, Orlando to Milwaukee, Muskegon, Miami. The smallest of the cities, Muskegon, got added to the lyrics via a suggestion from a former resident of the city Jerry Teifer. He was a music publishing executive for RCA at the time. The song was noted by critics as being "one of Ames' most commercial" recordings.

== Background and release ==
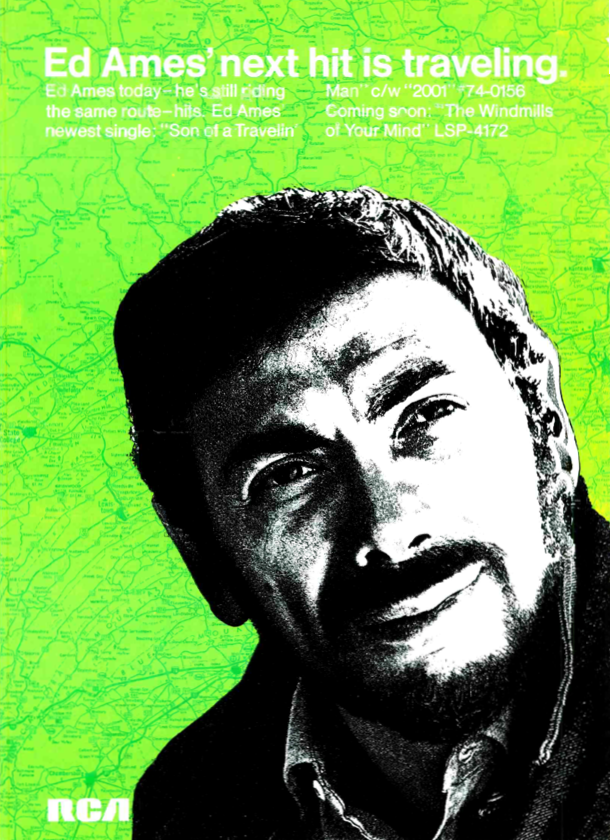
May 1969 RCA Victor trade ad for the single "Son of a Travelin' Man".

American singer Ed Ames enjoyed brief pop success in 1967 and 1968, charting several songs in the top-100 of charts. As sales decreased he switched his style to message songs in 1969 with "Changing, Changing" and the LP A Time for Living, a Time for Hope. In April his label released "Son of a Travellin' Man" as the lead single for his The Windmills of Your Mind LP. The single was produced by Jim Foglesong, and arranged by Artie Butler on the A-side, and by Jimmie Haskell on the B-side titled "2001".

== Critical reception ==
Professional ratings
Review scores
Source	Rating
Record World	4/5 stars
Billboard	Positive (Spotlight)
Cashbox	Positive (Pick of the Week)

The single received a positive critical reception upon its release. Billboard magazine stated that "Easy beat rhythm item with good lyric content has even more appeal than his recent 'Changing, Changing'", and called it a "Fine performance and production". Cashbox believed that "this effort has the flavor of a spiced-up 'Gentle on My Mind' rambling West Coast-y movement and the solid Ames vocal put this side into the spotlight for heavy exposure and sales in the top forty and easier-on-the-ear markets." Record World gave the single a four-star rating and said that Ames "changed" his pace, describing the song as "up-beat and infectious". The Orlando Evening Star referred to it as a "good record," believing that it can't "be a miss."

== Chart performance ==
"Son of a Travelin' Man" debuted on the US Billboard Hot 100 in the issue dated May 31, 1969, peaking at No. 92 during a four-week run on the chart. The single reached a lower No. 94 on the Cashbox Top 100 Singles. It was his final entry on both charts. The single also climbed to No. 21 on the Billboard Easy Listening chart and peaked at No. 20 on the Record World Top-Non Rock chart. "Son of a Travelin' Man" achieved more pop success in Canada, where it was ranked at No. 81 on the RPM Top 100 Singles charts. It was his final entry on these charts as well. It was ranked higher on their Adult Contemporary survey, climbing to No. 14.

== Charts ==
Chart performance for "Son of a Travelin' Man" by Ed Ames
Chart (1969)	Peak position
US Billboard Hot 100	92
US Billboard Easy Listening	21
US Cashbox Top 100 Singles	94
US Record World Top-Non Rock	20
Canada RPM Top 100 Singles	81
Canada RPM Adult Contemporary	14
