= Philemon (musical) =

Philemon is a 1975 Off-Broadway musical by Tom Jones and Harvey Schmidt. The show was produced on Hollywood Television Theatre in 1976 with the original cast and directed by Norman Lloyd. It had a brief Off-Broadway revival in 1991.

== Plot summary ==
Set in the city of Antioch (in the Roman Empire) during the third century, the Roman army has been ordered to hunt and kill all Christians. Marcus Gallerius, the commander of the Roman garrison hires a desperate street performer, Cockian, to impersonate the Christian priest Philemon, so that he may lure the true leader of the Christian underground. Cockian at first is unwilling to assume this role, but once his freedom is promised for carrying out this task, he agrees. The role is simple enough - living in a jail cell and intercepting any secret messages that may come through. Cockian meets Andos, a seemingly young prisoner who is responsible for seeing to Philemon's needs. But soon, the relationship between Andos and Cockian grows as the latter begins to see in him his deceased son. Cockian begins to realize that he identifies more and more with the values promulgated by Christianity. By the end of the play, when Cockian is given the chance to escape, he denies and instead attempts to make the Commander see the world in a new light, and embrace the values of love and freedom for all that he has come to appreciate. The Commander soon realizes that Cockian has transformed, and that while he had initially only been playing the role of Philemon, that he has now become Philemon, and when given the choice between life as Cockian or death as the Christian leader, Philemon chooses to die as a martyr.

== Principal characters ==
Cockian: a street performer who has a lengthy criminal record and who is recruited by the Commander to impersonate Philemon in exchange for the promise of having all his other charges dropped and free passage home.

Marcus: the commander of the Roman garrison who convinces Cockian to impersonate the Christian leader, Philemon. The Commander is a character who believes strongly in the institution of law and order as means of creating a world without flaws. He believes that executing Philemon will set an example for the rest of the Christian underground and succeed in its suppression.

Servillus: adjutant to the commander. Sevillus represents the Roman military; he takes orders from Marcus and acts as guard and enforcer on the streets of Antioch. At the end of the play, Servillus carries out the crucifixion of Cockian.

Andos: an eighteen-year-old prisoner in Antioch prison who has recently converted to Christianity for his expecting wife. Andos serves to Cockian as a messenger and his connection to the other Christian prisoners.

Kiki: Cockian's girlfriend, and his partner in their street act. Though mentioned only subtly, Kiki was once a prostitute, who believed that her relationship with Cockian would prove to be an escape from having to sell herself. Thus, when Cockian suggests that she prostitute herself for one more night in order to help him make some money, she leaves him with strong emotions of betrayal and anger, and then turns him into the authorities for his crimes.

Marsyas: Cockian's dead wife who returns to haunt him in a nightmare. Cockian has taken full responsibility for her death, as she died in childbirth, and is haunted by the sound of her voice several times throughout the show. When Marsyas died, she was considerably younger than Cockian is in the play, and the song she sings during the show (which haunts Cockian) serves to remind him of his age.

Woman (the Wife): the wife of the underground Christian leader who was killed. Her visit is ultimately one of the triggering factors which finally pushes Cockian to truly becoming Philemon: not only then does she bestow upon him the responsibility of becoming the leader of the underground, but she tells him of Andos' death which is of paramount importance to Cockian as Andos reminds him of his deceased son. She also teaches him, through a letter written to her husband, the importance of love.

== Songs ==
Act I

- Within This Empty Space
- The Streets of Antioch Stink
- Gimme A Good Digestion
- Don't Kiki Me
- I'd Do Almost Anything to Get Out of Here and Go Home
- He's Coming/Antioch Prison
- Name: Cockian

Act II

- I Love Order
- My Secret Dream
- I Love His Face
- Sometimes/Protest
- The Nightmare
- The Greatest of These
- The Confrontation

(a) How Free I Feel
(b) Oh, How Easy to Be Scornful
(c) Come with Me

- The Vision

(a) I See a Light
Greatest of These (reprise)
(b) Within This Empty Space

== Awards ==
- Dick Latessa — 1975 Obie Award for Best Performance
