= Roadside (musical) =

- Music: Harvey Schmidt
- Lyrics: Tom Jones
- Book: Tom Jones
- Basis: Roadside by Lynn Riggs
- Productions: 2001 Irving; 2001 Off-Broadway

Roadside is a musical with a book and lyrics by Tom Jones, and music by Harvey Schmidt.

Based on Lynn Riggs' 1929 play of the same name, it focuses on "early-20th century folks who didn't care to be absorbed into statehood".

== Background ==
Jones directed the play Roadside for his master's thesis in directing at the University of Texas. After Jones arrived in New York, Schmidt and he wrote a few songs for the musical and made a demo (but gave up since they could not acquire the rights).

== Productions ==
The show premiered on February 16, 2001, at the Irving Arts Center in Irving, Texas, with a cast consisting of Randy Tallman (Pap Raider), Stan Graner (Amos K. "Buzzey" Hale), Julie Johnson (Hannie Raider), Ryan Appleby (Red Ike), Steve Barcus (Black Ike), Jonathan Beck Reed (Texas), Richard Estes (The Verdigree Marshall), Rick Prada (Neb, the Jailer), Jerry Haynes (Judge Snodgrass), and Lois Sonnier (Miz Foster). The orchestra had Nyela Basney (piano), Mike Cruciger (banjo/guitar), and Dave Yonley (fiddle).

The show then moved to the Granbury Opera House in Granbury, Texas, and stayed there from March 9 through April 1, 2001.

The show opened Off-Broadway at the York Theatre on November 29, 2001, and starred Jennifer Allen (Mitz Foster), Ryan Appleby (Red Ike), G.W. Bailey (Pap Raider), Steve Barcus (Black Ike), Tom Flagg (Ned the Nailer), James Hindman (Amos K. "Buzzey" Hale), Julie Johnson (Hannie), Jonathan Beck Reed (Texas), and William Ryall (The Vedigree Marshall).

== Synopsis ==
The following is taken from the Roadside CD pamphlet:

Act One

On a small, traveling tent show stage like the ones that used to tour rural Texas during the early part of the twentieth century, Uncle Billy Barlow (G.W. Bailey) welcomes the audience and invites them to enjoy the show for the evening – “ROADSIDE.” As he hawks Uncle Billy Popcorn and introduces the other members of the company, he and the actors sing UNCLE BILLY’S TRAVELIN’ FAMILY SHOW.

Opening over, Uncle Billy steps into his role as Pap Raider while several of the others join him in a small “covered wagon” made of old-fashioned cut-out scenery. As the two look-alike cousins, Red Ike and Black Ike (Ryan Appleby & Steve Barcus) kneel in the shadows at the side and make the sound of horses’ hoofs, Pap sings ROADSIDE, joined first by Buzzey (James Hindman), a dried-up little farmer who is following on foot, and then by Pap's daughter Hannie (Julie Johnson), a lusty western woman with a romantic heart and a wicked sense of humor. When the wagon stops by the roadside, Buzzey tries to persuade Hannie to marry him and come live on his farm. Hannie is intrigued. “Just think,’ she says, “wake up in the morning and know whur you’re at.” But she has other dreams, dreams of finding a big, brawny, free-spirited man who can be Adam to her Eve. In the meantime, she's just waiting (HERE AM I).

The Ikes come rushing in with news of a crazy ring-tail-tooter of a cowboy named Texas who got drunk and tore up the town of Verdigree. He kicked the judge off the bench and “made just plumb hash” out of the courtroom. Hannie is impressed, and when she hears a loud, shouting voice down the road, she hurries into the wagon to get ready. Texas (Jonathan Beck Reed) comes in, banged-up from the brawl, and he and Pap hit it off immediately (I DON’T WANT TO BOTHER NOBODY).

When Hannie steps out of the wagon, all dolled up in her best dress, Texas is impressed. She tells him that when she heard him coming she ran in the wagon and purtied herself up before he got there. “Put most a pint of flour on my face to make me look nice. And smellamagoody perfume, half a bottle. Smell me.” Then, as she teasingly vamps him and he responds in a perfumed trance, Buzzey tries to distract them both from the business at hand (SMELLAMAGOODY PERFUME).

Texas decides to spend the night, and as they all bed down by the campfire, light comes up on Red Ike and Black Ike over by the orchestra as they do an “in one” olio number typical of the traveling tent shows of long ago (LOOKIN’ AT THE MOON).

Dawn, the next morning. The Verdigree Marshal (William Ryall), led to the scene by Buzzey, comes in and “gets the draw on” Texas. Pap and Hannie are very excited, expecting to see a miraculous fight, but Texas is staring straight into the Marshal's rifle, and he is thoroughly hungover. Even when the Marshal puts the rifle away and gives Texas his pistol back so they can have a good, old-fashioned shoot-out, all Texas can manage to do is drop to his knees and throw up in the stew pot, and Hannie is outraged. She turns on Texas and he tries to defend himself against her tirade as the Marshal leads him off to jail (I’M THROUGH WITH YOU!).

On the streets of Verdigree, Neb, the jailer, (Tom Flagg) and Miz Foster, the town busybody (Jennifer Allen) sing of the virtues of law and order as they watch a stream of people go by: first, Texas and Marshal, then Pap and the Ikes on their way to rescue Texas, and finally Hannie, followed by Buzzey, all rushing to the courthouse (PEACEFUL LITTLE TOWN). Texas’ spirits are somewhat lifted at the sight of the demolished courtroom, but the Marshal, backed up by Neb and Miz Foster, tries to convince him to mend his ways and learn how to TOE THE LINE. In the wild courtroom scene that follows, Pap and the Ikes do manage to set Texas free, but Hannie stops him before he can escape. The townspeople watch in amazement as Texas and Hannie resume their battle (I’M THROUGH WITH YOU, Reprise). At the end of the number, Hannie hauls off and hits Texas on the jaw. As he collapses to the floor, she says, “All right, Mr. Marshal, you can hang him for all I care” and then she grabs Buzzey to go look for a preacher.

Act Two

Act Two opens with Uncle Billy and the two Ikes bringing the audience up to date on what has happened (BACK TO OUR STORY). This is followed by Buzzey, all dressed up in his wedding outfit from Sears and Roebuck, giving advice to other bachelors about how to “stand out” with the ladies (PERSONALITY PLUS). Texas, chained to what is left of the Verdigree jail, is forced to admit that, in spite of his dreams, he may be nothing more than just ANOTHER DRUNKEN COWBOY. Pap comes in to offer sympathy and a drink of whiskey. Remembering the traveling days with his wife LuAnne, Pap convinces Texas that marriage can be more than just fences and chains (THE WAY IT SHOULD BE). And Texas, rejuvenated, pulls loose from his shackles, bends back the bars of the jailhouse, and goes rushing off to find Hannie.

Meanwhile, back in the olio “in-one” position, Red Ike and Black Ike do a little western vaudeville number called PRAIRIE FLOWER, complete with battered old top hats, canes, and a sort of “clod-hopper” soft shoe dance routine. When it is over, they take their bows and run off as we return to the story. At the wagon, in her improvised wedding outfit, Hannie is in a foul mood. She regrets her decision to marry Buzzey, she is still furious at Texas, and she concludes that ALL MEN IS CRAZY. Texas comes in. He makes a passionate plea for her to come with him, but Hannie refuses. She's tired of dreaming dreams she knows will never come true. Texas, however, won't take “no” for an answer (AIN’T NO WOMERN BUT YOU), and by the end of the song, both are locked in a passionate embrace.

The Marshal comes in, followed by Buzzey and the townspeople, all with shooting irons and a rope. Texas, supremely confident, turns himself over to the law. They put the noose around his neck, but before they can hang him, Texas tells them the miraculous story of his supernatural birth (BORNED). At first, the others are skeptical, but as the story gets wilder and more exciting, they get more and more carried away. By the end of it, they are ready, not only to set Texas free, but to join him in celebration (WILD AND RECKLESS). After all, as Texas tells them, “You cain’t hang me! I’m who you are!”

Finally, as even the disillusioned Buzzey joins the townspeople in an improvised wedding song (PEACEFUL LITTLE TOWN, Reprise), Texas and Hannie are married by the Marshal. Suddenly, they all face front and, led in a vision by Texas and Hannie, they sing of the world that used to be, the world they're bringing back to life (THE WAY IT SHOULD BE, Reprise).

Lights dim just for a second and when they come back up (ROADSIDE, Reprise), we see the little wagon up in cowboy heaven. Texas is standing in the front, holding the reins. Hannie sits beside him, a baby in her arms, and her hair blowing in the wind. Pap leans out of the back of the wagon, waving his old battered hat, and the Ikes are behind him with little cardboard wings attached to their arms. As the clouds drift by, they all sing: “Gonna spend my whole life long / Along the road! / Roadside…!”

== Musical numbers ==
Act I

- Overture
- "Uncle Billy's Travellin' Family Show"
- "Roadside"
- "Here Am I"
- "I Don't Want to Bother Nobody"
- "Smellamagoody Perfume"
- "Smellamagoody Perfume (Reprise)"
- "Lookin' at the Moon"
- "I'm Through with You"
- "Peaceful Little Town"
- "I Toe the Line"
- "I'm Through with You (Reprise)"

Act II

- "Back to Our Story"
- "Personality Plus"
- "Another Drunken Cowboy"
- "The Way It Should Be"
- "My Little Prairie Flower"
- "All Men Is Crazy"
- "Ain't No Womern but You"
- "Borned"
- "Wild and Reckless"
- "Finale"
