= 110 in the Shade =

Musical

- Original cast recording cover
- Music: Harvey Schmidt
- Lyrics: Tom Jones
- Book: N. Richard Nash
- Basis: The Rainmaker by N. Richard Nash
- Productions: 1963 Broadway; 1967 West End; 1992 New York City Opera; 1999 London concert 2007 Broadway revival

110 in the Shade is a musical with a book by N. Richard Nash, lyrics by Tom Jones, and music by Harvey Schmidt.

Based on Nash's 1954 play The Rainmaker, it focuses on Lizzie Curry, a spinster living on a ranch in the American southwest, and her relationships with local sheriff File, a cautious divorcé who fears being hurt again, and charismatic con man Bill Starbuck, posing as a rainmaker who promises the locals he can bring relief to the drought-stricken area. Nash's book is faithful to his original play, although all the interior scenes were moved outdoors to allow for the addition of townspeople for ensemble numbers and dances. Many of Jones' lyrics come directly from Nash's play.

== Productions ==
=== Original Broadway Production ===
Following the success of The Fantasticks, the project was the composing team's first for Broadway. The original score was almost operatic in scope, and when the show's running time in Boston proved to be too long, the creative team began trimming numbers, eventually discarding nearly as many as were heard in the finished product. After two previews, the production, directed by Joseph Anthony and choreographed by Agnes de Mille, opened on October 24, 1963, at the Broadhurst Theatre, where it ran for 330 performances. The cast included Robert Horton as Starbuck, Inga Swenson as Lizzie, and Stephen Douglass as File, with Will Geer, Lesley Ann Warren, and Gretchen Cryer in supporting roles. The sets were by Oliver Smith and costumes by Motley. The show received four Tony Award nominations but won none. RCA Victor released an original Broadway cast recording of this production on November 3, 1963, with one recording in stereo and one in mono. Both recordings were identical, each having 16 tracks. RCA Victor also released the recording on Compact Disc on June 12, 1990, with one track--"Overture" not heard on the previous LP recordings.

=== Original London Production ===
The first and only West End production, directed by Charles Blackwell, recreated the original Broadway production closely and opened on February 8, 1967, at the Palace Theatre, where it ran for 101 performances.

=== 1992 New York City Opera Revival ===
A 1992 New York City Opera production, directed by Scott Ellis and choreographed by Susan Stroman, starred Karen Ziemba as Lizzie. The score was heard to particular advantage here, as the opera company orchestra was appreciably larger than the conventional Broadway pit orchestra. A 2-CD studio recording released by Jay Records on October 21, 1997, conducted by John Owen Edwards, features Ziemba, Walter Charles, Ron Raines, Kristin Chenoweth, and Schmidt and Jones. The recording was based on the 1992 New York City Opera production, and includes five bonus tracks from the New York City Opera production.

=== 1999 Concert Production ===
In 1999, a concert version was staged at the Fortune Theatre in London by Ian Marshall Fisher for the Discovering Lost Musicals Charitable Trust, with Louise Gold as Lizzie. For this production only a piano accompaniment was used, and the cast was unmiked.

=== 2007 Broadway Revival ===
The Roundabout Theater Company presented a new production of the show, which opened on May 9, 2007, at Studio 54, and closed on July 29, 2007, after 94 performances and 27 previews. The production team was headed by director Lonny Price and designer Santo Loquasto. They were joined by lighting designer Christopher Akerlind, sound designer Dan Moses Schreier, and musical arranger David Krane along with musical supervisor/director, Paul Gemignani, who has worked closely with Price on various stage projects in the past. The cast featured Audra McDonald as Lizzie, Steve Kazee as Bill Starbuck, and John Cullum as H.C. Curry. McDonald won the Drama Desk Award for Outstanding Actress in a Musical and was nominated for a Tony Award for her performance. Ben Brantley wrote of McDonald: "Is it possible for a performance to be too good? Audra McDonald brings such breadth of skill and depth of feeling to the Roundabout Theater Company revival of '110 in the Shade' that she threatens to burst the seams of this small, homey musical. Ravishing of voice and Olympian of stature, she's an overwhelming presence in an underwhelming show."

The revival also garnered four additional Tony nominations, but failed to win any. In June 2010, McDonald reprised her Tony-nominated role in a two-week fundraising production of the show for the Hale Center Theater in Orem, Utah. A recording of this production was released on June 12, 2007, by PS Classics. It drops the "Overture" but adds two tracks of dialogue.

== Song list ==
Act I

- "Another Hot Day" - File and Townspeople
- "Lizzie's Comin' Home " - H.C. Curry, Noah Curry, and Jimmy Curry
- "Love, Don't Turn Away" - Lizzie Curry
- "Poker Polka" - File, H.C. Curry, Noah Curry, and Jimmy Curry
- "The Hungry Men" - Lizzie Curry and Townspeople
- "The Rain Song" - Bill Starbuck and Townspeople
- "You're Not Foolin' Me" - Bill Starbuck and Lizzie Curry
- "Cinderella" - Vivian Lorraine Taylor and Lizzie Curry
- "Raunchy" - Lizzie Curry
- "A Man and a Woman" - File and Lizzie Curry
- "Old Maid" - Lizzie Curry

Act II

- "Evenin' Star" (added for the 2007 revival) - Bill Starbuck
- "Everything Beautiful Happens at Night" - Lizzie Curry and Townspeople
- "Melisande" - Bill Starbuck
- "Simple Little Things" - Lizzie Curry
- "Little Red Hat" - Snookie and Jimmy Curry
- "Is It Really Me?" - Lizzie Curry
- "Wonderful Music" - Bill Starbuck, File, and Lizzie Curry
- "The Rain Song" (Reprise) - Townspeople

== Synopsis ==
=== Act I ===
It's the Fourth of July in 1936, in the small town of Three Point in the Southwestern U.S., where a blistering heat wave has the local sheriff, File, and the other townsfolk forever eyeing the sky ("Another Hot Day"). Elsewhere in town, on the ranch of widower H.C. Curry, the air is also charged with anticipation, due to the imminent arrival of H.C.'s daughter ("Lizzie's Coming Home"), who's been off visiting friends of the family (pseudo-relatives "Uncle" Ned and "Aunt" Marabelle and their sons) in [Sweetwater]. The trip was designed to find Lizzie a husband, but to no avail: as at home, her intelligence, sharp wit, and insecurities proved her undoing. H.C. and his sons, Jim and Noah, hatch a plan to invite Sheriff File to the annual picnic lunch, where Lizzie can impress him with her prettiest party dress and tastiest picnic basket. Reluctant at first, but then allowing herself to dream just a bit, Lizzie agrees ("Love Don't Turn Away").

Sheriff File, unfortunately, proves immune to every enticement the Curry boys offer ("Poker Polka"). His mind is more on "some sort of outlaw" heading into town, a fellow named Tornado Johnson; besides, he knows a fix-up when he sees one, and as he puts it, "I can mend my own shirts." Jim and Noah depart, but H.C. stays behind to tell File he knows the lie File's been living: that File's not a widower, as he claims to be—that his wife ran out on him. H.C. sees a man who's lonely and shut off, one who needs "a lot more mendin' than shirts," but File grows angry and defensive, and H.C. leaves him be.

As the ladies at the picnic grounds await the arrival of "The Hungry Men", File is noticeably not among them, and although her father and brothers do their best to console her, Lizzie feels the sting of File's rejection. Jim suggests she'd have more luck if she flirted more—played down her intelligence and told men what they wanted to hear like Lily Ann Beasley, who has all the men in town weak in the knees. But Lizzie is resolute in her vision of a husband: "I want him to stand up straight—and I want to be able to stand up straight to him!"

Suddenly, something sounds like a dry, rattling crack of summer thunder, and with it appears a handsome stranger who introduces himself as "Starbuck—Rainmaker." His bold promises induce the town into a revivalist frenzy ("The Rain Song"), and H.C. plunks down a hundred dollars for the promise of rain within twenty-four hours. But Lizzie sees through Starbuck's pretenses, and he instantly sees through hers ("You're Not Foolin' Me"). His accusations touch a nerve, and as he exits, a childhood song runs through her head ("Cinderella") that darkens her mood further. Feeling a need to "get out of me for a while," she imagines a different sort of Lizzie Curry ("Raunchy").

File appears unexpectedly at the picnic grounds and, still insistent that he has a right to be alone, nonetheless reaches out to Lizzie, coming clean about his past and, almost despite himself, revealing old wounds ("A Man and a Woman"). But as they start to open up to each other, Lizzie's candid comments—and her feeble attempts to retract them—drive File away in a fury. Her family appears instantly to grill her, and Noah lashes out at her father's efforts to console her, insisting she accept the reality that she's going to end up alone. Lizzie, with terror in her heart, faces her future ("Old Maid").

=== Act II ===
As twilight approaches, lovers still haunt the picnic grounds. Starbuck is there as well, alone and quiet, doing a bit of soul-searching ("Evenin' Star", added for the 2007 revival). The others merely admire the majesty of the night sky ("Everything Beautiful Happens At Night"). For Lizzie, though, twilight means putting an end to her daydreams, and yet, still in search of something she can't quite define, she finds herself drawn to Starbuck's camp. Sensing her discontent, he encourages her to dream again—this time far beyond her small-town horizons ("Melisande"). Instinctively defensive, as before, Lizzie counters that her dreams are just a different kind ("Simple Little Things"), but feeling that she'll never get what she wants, she breaks down. Starbuck grabs her, encouraging her to see herself through her own eyes, and not as she fears others view her; he takes the pins out of her hair and insists she recognize her own beauty. The lights fade as they begin to make love.

Back at the picnic area, Jim is boasting of his own Fourth of July adventures ("Little Red Hat") when File arrives to tell the Curry clan that he's on the lookout for Tornado Johnson—aka rainmaker Starbuck. He understands that H.C. gave him a hundred dollars for the promise of rain, but H.C., well aware that Lizzie is with Starbuck, refuses to reveal his whereabouts. Noah is shocked that his father is willing to leave Lizzie alone with a conman, but H.C. understands his daughter's needs, "even if it's only one minute—with a man talkin' quiet and his hand touchin' her face." Back at Starbuck's tent, that's precisely what's happening, as Starbuck shares a difficult secret: "I never made rain in my life! Not a single raindrop!" Lizzie counsels him that "it's not good to live in your dreams," but he notes that it's not good to live outside of them, either. She concludes that the best way to live is "somewhere between the two" ("Is It Really Me?").

As the Curry family awaits Lizzie's arrival, the mood is silent and tense. But she appears joyous and transformed ("I've got a new beau!"), and when File arrives to arrest Starbuck, the entire Curry clan defends him. Starbuck implores Lizzie to join him in his travels, and File—suddenly aware of what he needs and what he might lose—steps forward to plead his own case ("Wonderful Music"). Lizzie, with a new sense of her own worth, makes her decision. As Starbuck exits for parts unknown, a low rumble of thunder ushers in a sudden cloudburst, less than twenty-four hours after his arrival. And as the townspeople revel at the heavy downpour ("The Rain Song" reprise), Lizzie and File rejoice in the promise of hope and renewal that rainfall brings.

== Awards and nominations ==
=== Original Broadway production ===
Year	Award	Category	Nominee	Result
1964	Tony Award	Best Original Score	Tom Jones and Harvey Schmidt	Nominated
1964	Tony Award	Best Performance by a Leading Actress in a Musical	Inga Swenson	Nominated
1964	Tony Award	Best Performance by a Featured Actor in a Musical	Will Geer	Nominated
1964	Tony Award	Best Direction of a Musical	Joseph Anthony	Nominated

=== 2007 Broadway revival ===
Year	Award	Category	Nominee	Result
2007	Tony Award	Best Revival of a Musical		Nominated
2007	Tony Award	Best Performance by a Leading Actress in a Musical	Audra McDonald	Nominated
2007	Tony Award	Best Performance by a Featured Actor in a Musical	John Cullum	Nominated
2007	Tony Award	Best Orchestrations	Jonathan Tunick	Nominated
2007	Tony Award	Best Lighting Design	Christopher Akerlind	Nominated
2007	Drama Desk Award	Outstanding Revival of a Musical		Won
2007	Drama Desk Award	Outstanding Actress in a Musical	Audra McDonald	Won
