= Jean Louisa Kelly =

American actress (born 1972)

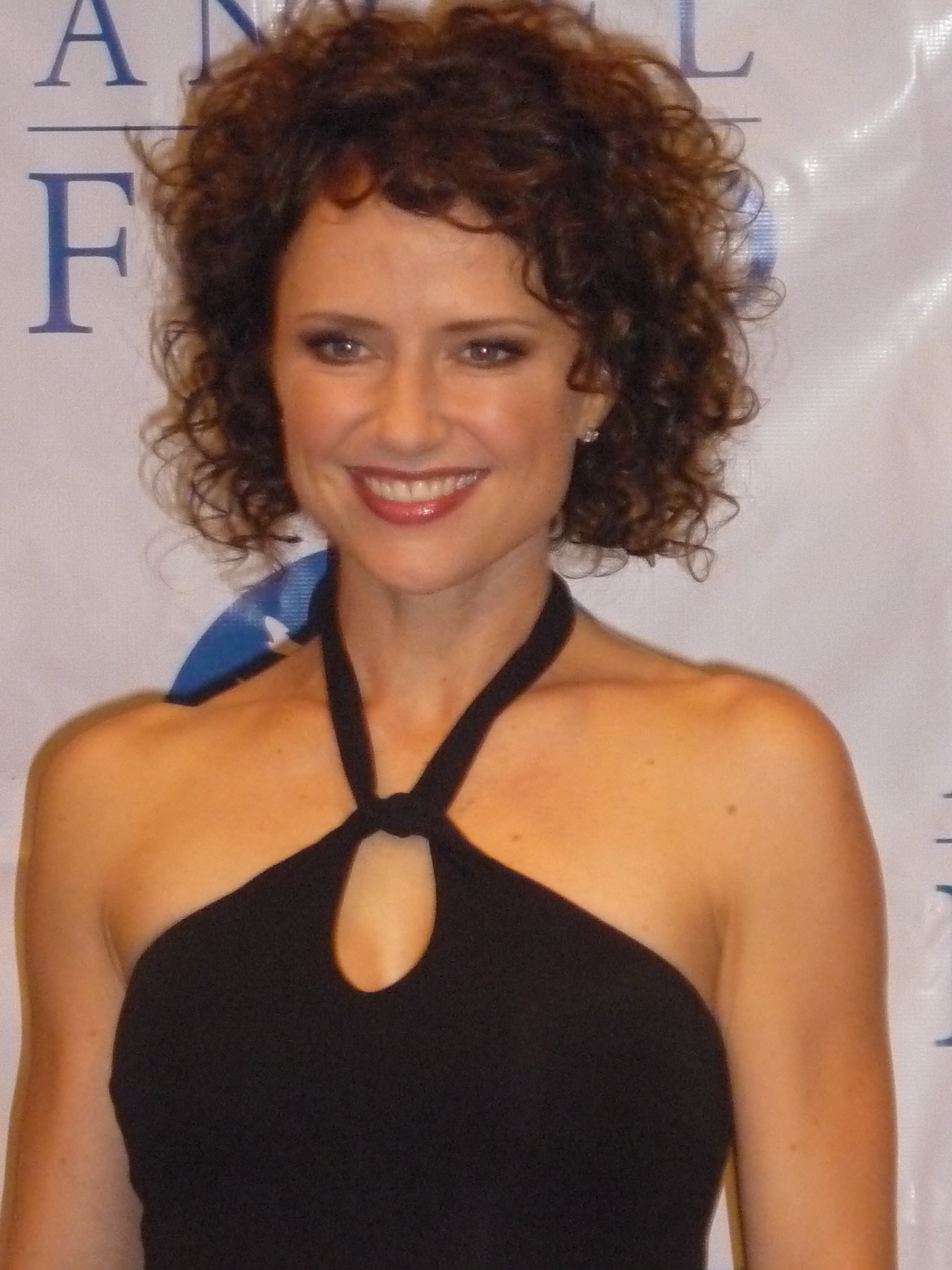
- Kelly in 2009
- Born: March 9, 1972 (age 54); Worcester, Massachusetts, U.S.
- Education: Columbia University (BA)
- Occupations: Actress, singer
- Years active: 1987–present
- Notable work: Uncle Buck (1989); Mr. Holland's Opus (1995); Yes, Dear (2000–06)
- Spouse: James Pitaro (m. 1997)
- Children: 2
- Website: jeanlouisakelly.com

Jean Louisa Kelly (born March 9, 1972) is an American actress. After making her film debut as Tia Russell in Uncle Buck (1989) alongside John Candy, she appeared in a wide range of other films, including The Fantasticks (1995) and Mr. Holland's Opus (1995). From 2000 to 2006, she portrayed Kim Warner on the CBS sitcom Yes, Dear.

== Early career and education ==
Kelly's first professional paying job was as a child, starring in "Annie" at the Theater by the Sea in Mantunuck, Rhode Island. She reprised her "Annie" role the following summer at the Candlewood Playhouse in New Fairfield, Connecticut. Before attending college, she already had roles in the original Broadway cast of Sondheim's Into the Woods (as Snow White) at the age of 15 and understudy to Rapunzel and Little Red Ridinghood, and as Tia Russell in the film Uncle Buck with John Candy. She also took roles in college productions, including with the Barnard College Gilbert and Sullivan Society.

== Later acting roles ==
In the mid-1990s, after graduating from Columbia University, Kelly became well known for a series of television commercials for MCI long distance in which she played a telephone operator who challenged AT&T. In 1995, she starred as Luisa in the musical film The Fantasticks with Joey McIntyre and Joel Grey, although the film was shelved until 2000. Also in 1995, she played Rowena Morgan, the muse for the title character of Mr. Holland's Opus; she was cast while the movie was already in production, replacing another actress.

Other films followed, including "Origin of the Species," "The Day Lincoln was Shot" and Landfall (2001). Kelly appeared off-Broadway at the York Theatre in the title role in Paul McKibbins and B. T. McNicholl's The It Girl, based on the 1927 movie It. She also appeared in the York's "Musicals in Mufti" series as Lois Lane in It's a Bird, It's a Plane, It's Superman. In 1996, Kelly voiced the title role in the second season of the animated series Princess Gwenevere and the Jewel Riders.

After several made-for-TV movies, Kelly's broadest exposure came from her roles in situation comedies, first guest starring in such shows as Mad About You, and then as a cast member of the short-lived NBC version of Cold Feet. From 2000 to 2006, she starred as Kim Warner on the long-running sitcom Yes, Dear. In 2006 she guest starred in the ABC drama Grey's Anatomy. After her series ended, she guest starred on numerous television shows and starred in movies of the week. She recurred as Bernice Pope in the Yahoo production of Sin City Saints.

She played opposite William Fichtner in the movie "The Neighbor" and opposite John Diehl in "Out of the Wild" in 2015. In 2019 she played opposite Bradley Whitford in "Call of the Wild," and played Jane Doe/Serena May in the James Wan movie "Malignant." Kelly appeared as Sarah Kazansky, the wife of Val Kilmer's character Tom "Iceman" Kazansky, in the 2022 film Top Gun: Maverick.

== Music ==
She released an album of children's music called Color of Your Heart in 2013. In 2015, she released a five-song EP called Willing, and in 2017 she released an album titled "For My Folks", which features a collection of standards.

== Personal life ==
Kelly was born in Worcester, Massachusetts, the daughter of J. Joseph Kelly III and Wendy Kelly. Her father was a high school English teacher, and her mother taught piano. She grew up in Boylston, Massachusetts, eventually moving to Maryland when she was a junior in high school, and attended Easton High School in Easton, Maryland. In 1994, Kelly graduated from Columbia University's Columbia College with a Bachelor of Arts in English.

In 1997, she married attorney James Pitaro. They have two children. She is close friends with Jennifer Garner.

== Filmography ==
=== Film ===
Year	Title	Role	Notes
1989	Uncle Buck	Tia Russell	
1992	American Shaolin	Maria	
1995	The Fantasticks	Luisa Bellamy	
1995	Mr. Holland's Opus	Rowena Morgan	
1998	Origin of the Species	Laura	
1999	A Stranger in the Kingdom	Athena Allen	
2001	Landfall	Marguerite Harris	
2003	Little Red Light	Amanda Meyer	Short film
2010	Locked Away	Chloe	
2010	Public Access	Nancy	Short film
2011	Lego Hero Factory: Savage Planet	Waspix	Voice
2014	1000 to 1: The Cory Weissman Story	Tina Weissman	Video
2014	Zoe Gone	Detective Patricia Henderson	
2015	Ant-Man	Buyer	
2017	The Neighbor	Lisa	
2017	The Bachelors	Barbara Weston	
2019	Out of the Wild	Jessie King	
2020	The Call of the Wild	Katie Miller	
2021	Malignant	Serena May / Jane Doe	
2022	Top Gun: Maverick	Sarah Kazansky	

=== Television ===
Year	Title	Role	Notes
1994	Breathing Lessons	Daisy	Movie
1994	One More Mountain	Mary Graves	Movie
1995	Tad	Julia Taft	Movie
1996	Harvest of Fire	Rachel	Movie
1996	Princess Gwenevere and the Jewel Riders	Princess Gwenevere (voice)	Main role (10 episodes)
1997	Homicide: Life on the Street	Sarah Langdon	Episode: "Kaddish"
1997	Stolen Women: Captured Hearts	Sarah White	Movie
1998	Ruby Bridges	Jane Coles	Movie
1998	The Day Lincoln Was Shot	Lucy Lambert Hale	Movie
1998	Law & Order	Coral Galvin	Episode: "Scrambled"
1998/99	Mad About You	Diane Ellis	3 episodes
1999	The Cyberstalking	Holly Moon	Movie
1999	Cold Feet	Shelley Sullivan	Main role (8 episodes)
2000–06	Yes, Dear	Kim Warner	Main role (122 episodes)
2001	Ally McBeal	Lisa	Episode: "The Ex-Files"
2006	Grey's Anatomy	Rose Ward	Episode: "Blues for Sister Someone"
2008	Ghost Whisperer	Jennifer Quinlan / Nora Sutherland	Episode: "First Do No Harm"
2008	Eli Stone	Julie Lazer	Episode: "Heal the Pain"
2008	Gary Unmarried	Beth	Episode: "Gary and Allison Brooks"
2009	Surviving Suburbia	Melissa Mann	Episode: "Desperate Housewife"
2009	The Three Gifts	Cherie Green	Movie
2010	The Glades	Becky	Episode: "A Perfect Storm"
2010	Burn Notice	Emily	Episode: "Blind Spot"
2010–13	Hero Factory	Natalie Breez / Operator	Recurring role; 6 episodes
2011	Paul the Male Matchmaker	Darla	2 episodes
2011	CSI: Miami	Amy Wells	Episode: "Stoned Cold"
2012	CSI: Crime Scene Investigation	Sheila DeMarcus	Episode: "Code Blue Plate Special"
2013	Chance at Romance	Roz	Hallmark Channel TV movie
2013	The Good Mother	Rachel	Television movie
2014	Zoe Gone	Det. Patricia Henderson	Lifetime television movie
2015	Sin City Saints	Bernice Pope	Yahoo Studios
2015	Scream Queens	Delight Ulrich	Episode:"The Final Girl(s)"
2017	Can't Buy My Love	Veronica	Movie
2017	Major Crimes	Tori Duncan	Episode;"Bad Blood"
2017	Outcast	Therapist	2 episodes
2017	Law & Order True Crime	Marzi Eisenberg	Episode: "The Menendez Murders: Episode 1"
2018	Wisdom of the Crowd	Mrs. Bullock	Episode: "The Tipping Point"
2018	The Fosters	Pastor Nicole	2 episodes
