= Burt Shevelove =

American dramatist (1915–1982)

- Born: Burton George Shevelove; September 19, 1915; Newark, New Jersey, U.S.
- Died: April 8, 1982 (aged 66); London, England
- Education: Brown University (BA); Yale University (MFA)
- Occupations: Author, director, playwright, librettist

Burton George Shevelove (September 19, 1915 – April 8, 1982) was an American musical theater playwright, lyricist, librettist, and director.

== Biography ==
Born in Newark, New Jersey, he graduated from Brown University and Yale (Master's degree). At Brown in 1935, he acted in the first ever Brownbrokers musical titled Something Bruin. After serving as a volunteer ambulance driver in World War II, he began working as a writer, director and producer for radio and television. At the time of his death he had lived in London for many years.

His Broadway career started in 1948 with writing material, co-producing and directing for the revue Small Wonder. Among his successes were A Funny Thing Happened on the Way to the Forum and No, No, Nanette, for which he won the Drama Desk Award for Outstanding Book of a Musical.

He died at his apartment in London, where he had been living for about 15 years, on April 8. 1982. He was survived by his mother and a sister.

== Work ==
=== Libretti ===
- A Funny Thing Happened on the Way to the Forum 1962, revived 1972, 1996
- No, No, Nanette revisions made in 1971, from an original libretto by Otto Harbach and Frank Mandel.
- The Frogs adapted from Aristophanes' play in 1974; in 2004 Nathan Lane further adapted Shevelove's libretto for the work's Broadway premiere
- Happy New Year 1980
- Jerome Robbins' Broadway 1989; used some of Shevelove's Forum text

=== Directing ===
- Small Wonder (1948)
- Hallelujah, Baby! (1967)
- Rockefeller and the Red Indians (1968)
- No, No, Nanette (1971)
- A Funny Thing Happened on the Way to the Forum (1972)
- Sondheim: A Musical Tribute (1973)
- June Moon (1974 PBS production)
- Rodgers & Hart (1975)
- So Long, 174th Street (1976)
- Happy New Year (1980)

=== Lyrics ===
- Small Wonder 1948
