= Brownbrokers =

Student theater group at Brown University

Brownbrokers' Logo

Brownbrokers is a student-run theater group at Brown University. Together with Brown's Theatre Arts and Performance Studies faculty, Brownbrokers develops and produces a full-length, student-written musical every other year. Founded in 1935, it is one of the oldest undergraduate producing bodies devoted to new student-written musical theatre, both comedic and dramatic, in the United States. The group is run by The Brownbrokers Board, an organization of self-elected students from the Brown student body. In addition to the biennial full-scale production, Brownbrokers produces smaller events such as the annual miniMUSICAL Festival and staged readings of the musicals in consideration for production the following year.

== History ==
Founded in 1935 Brownbrokers has been producing original student-written musicals on the Brown University Department stage for over 75 years. In 1934, a Pembroke College student and composer named Carolyn Troy '35 wrote a song titled “Patch Up Your Heart.” Wanting to produce a musical revue on the Brown and Pembroke campuses, she teamed up with friend Burton K. Shevelove '37 (Burt Shevelove) and together with a few other Brown undergraduates, they founded Brownbrokers. By 1935, student interest in staging a musical revue led to the hiring of Leslie Allen Jones ’26 to organize the new endeavor. Serving both Brown and Pembroke College, the group fused the “broke” of Pembroke with “Brown” to create the Brownbrokers name.

Brownbrokers’ first production was titled Something Bruin and opened on May 10, 1935. The revue included 23 original numbers. Burt Shevelove was cast in this inaugural production. The success of Something Bruin led Sock and Buskin to provide Brownbrokers with the resources and space for an annual production. Road to Bruin and Man about Brown, the 1936 and 1937 productions respectively, parodied both life at Brown and the national politics of the day. In 1943, there was no Brownbrokers show because of World War II, but Brownbrokers returned with Scuttlebutt in 1944, a navy-themed revue.

Under the guidance of the Brownbrokers Board, the productions began to transition from themed revues to book musicals in the 1950s and 1960s. Barney n’ Me and Fiddle-De-Dee, the 1956 and 1957 shows, had librettos and lyrics by Alfred Uhry ’58, future Pulitzer Prize, Tony Award and Oscar Award winner. In 1958, Down to Earth was the first Brownbrokers show written entirely by students from Pembroke College. The annual productions continued with two exceptions. In 1962, Sock and Buskin instead produced William Inge's Bus Stop in the usual Brownbrokers slot. In 1974, due to a low turn out for auditions, Brownbrokers instead produced a pre-written, non-musical play titled Play it Again, Sam.

In 2008, the Brownbrokers development and production process was rebuilt to operate on a biennial basis. The first production under the biennial system was Leavittsburg, OH, with book, music and lyrics by Nate Sloan ’09. Brownbrokers second production under the new system, We Can Rebuild Him by Deepali Gupta '12, received its world premiere in Providence, Rhode Island in March 2012.

== Notable alumni ==
- Burt Shevelove (Class of 1937) – A founder of Brownbrokers, actor in the first Brownbrokers revue and Chairman of the Brownbrokers Production Committee, Burt Shevelove went on to become a recognized playwright and stage director. He wrote the books for A Funny Thing Happened on the Way to the Forum with Stephen Sondheim and No, No, Nanette (Drama Desk Award for Outstanding Book of a Musical).
- George M. Cohan – Born and raised in Providence, RI, George M. Cohan was a major American entertainer, playwright and composer, well known for his songs Give My Regards to Broadway, The Yankee Doodle Boy, and You're a Grand Old Flag. He was made an honorary Brownbrokers Board member when he attended a dress rehearsal of Curriculi-Curricula (1938) and positively reviewed the production.
- Alfred Uhry (Class of 1958) – A Pulitzer Prize-winner and a two-time Brownbrokers writer in the 1950s, Alfred Uhry went on to pen Parade, The Last Night of Ballyhoo and Driving Miss Daisy, among others.
- Robert Waldman (Class of 1958) - A three-time Brownbrokers composer, Robert Waldman has composed original music for Here's Where I Belong and The Robber Bridegroom and orchestrations for The Last Night of Ballyhoo, all collaborations with former classmate and Brownbrokers partner, Alfred Uhry.
- David Yazbek (Class of 1982) – Tony and Emmy Award-winning composer and Brownbrokers writer, David Yazbek has composed scores for such Broadway musicals as The Full Monty, Dirty Rotten Scoundrels and Women on the Verge of a Nervous Breakdown. In 2018, he received a Tony for best original score for The Band's Visit.
- Stephen Karam (Class of 2002) – A MacDowell Colony Fellow, Stephen Karam has received national recognition for his plays columbinus, Speech and Debate and Sons of the Prophet. During his time at Brown, he wrote a nationally acclaimed Brownbrokers show titled Emma, which was reprised at The Kennedy Center American College Theatre Festival in Washington, D.C., winning the Michael Kanin Playwriting Award for Musical Theatre. Emma also received the NYMF Director's Choice Award. In May 2011, he revisited his Brownbrokers show Emma through the New York-based company Waterwell's developmental New Works Lab.

== Notable past productions ==
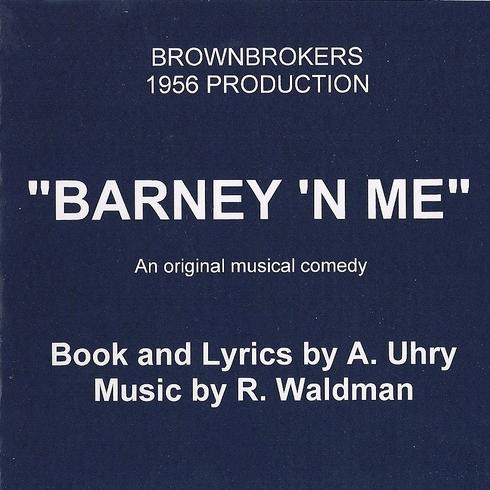
Barney 'N Me Cast Recording Cover

A comprehensive timeline of past Brownbrokers productions is referenced below.

- 1935: Something Bruin (opened May 10, 1935)
- 1936: Road to Bruin
- 1937: Man about Brown – directed by Burt Shevelove and Harold Greenspan
- 1938: Curriculi-Curricula
- 1943: No Brownbrokers production (World War II)
- 1944: Scuttlebutt – directed by Leslie A. Jones and Janine O. Van deWater
- 1945: Souvenirs – a tenth anniversary compilation of past Brownbrokers musicals with new compositions by Frannie Patenaude, Alma Fain, Josie Truscot and Al Pomerantz
- 1956: Barney ’n Me – book and lyrics by Alfred Uhry '58, music by Robert Waldman
- 1957: Fiddle-De-Dee – book and lyrics by Alfred Uhry '58 and Jack Rosenblum, music by Robert Waldman
- 1958: Down to Earth – by Nancy Worcester '58, Barbara Burgess '58 and Connie Hansen '58 (first Brownbrokers show written entirely by Pembroke students) and set designed by Richard Foreman '59
- 1960 Happily Never After by Emily Arnold McCully and Elizabeth Diggs, with music by Suzi Ross
- 1968: Good Times Illustrated Weekly – book by Alfred Basile '70 and music by William Griffith '70 (received Honorable First Mention in the 1967/1968 Broadcast Music, Inc. Awards)
- 1987: A Hustle Here, A Hustle There – book and lyrics by Paul Greenberg, music by David McLary (based on the Lou Reed song Walk on the Wild Side, with a set designed by Brian Selznick); directed by Vivienne Goldschmidt '89.
- 1988: The Malady Lingers On – book and lyrics by Jonathan Schaffir, music by Maria Seigenthaler '90; directed by Brian Herrera '90.
- 2000: Emma – by Stephen Karam '02 (Michael Kanin Playwriting Award for Musical Theatre and the NYMF Director's Choice Award)
- 2003: Transforming Jimmy Dalton – book and lyrics by Rebecca Rouse '04 and music by Brendan Padgett; directed by Michael Perlman '05.
- 2004: Psyche – book and lyrics by Jed Resnick '06 and music by James Egelhofer '04
- 2005: Moon Mary – book and lyrics by Ella Rose Chary '07 and Angie Thurston '07, music by Jon Russ '07
- 2006: The Pursuit of History – book and lyrics by Michelle Oing '07, music and lyrics by Daniel Bowman '07
- 2007: Elsewards – book and lyrics by Jessie Hopkins '08, music by Jerzy Fischer '08
- 2008 / 2009: Adding Up by Sarah Kay '10 and Drew Nobile '07 and Leavittsburg, OH by Nate Slan '09 are developed
- 2009 / 2010: Leavittsburg, OH by Nate Sloan ‘09 is produced
- 2010 / 2011: DORIAN by David Brown '12, Lance Jabr '12 and Phoebe Nir '14 and We Can Rebuild Him by Deepali Gupta '12 are developed
- 2011 / 2012: We Can Rebuild Him by Deepali Gupta ‘12 is produced
