= The Game of Love (musical) =

- Promotional artwork
- Music: Jacques Offenbach
- Lyrics: Tom Jones
- Setting: Vienna, Austria-Hungary, late 19th century
- Basis: Anatol and Anatols Größenwahn by Arthur Schnitzler
- Premiere: 15 June 1965

The Game of Love is an English-language musical based on the German plays Anatol and Anatols Größenwahn ("Anatol's megalomania") by Austrian playwright Arthur Schnitzler. It is set in late 19th century Vienna, and chronicles the many shallow and immature relationships of bourgeois playboy Anatol. The musical is based on the translation of the play by Tom Jones. The lyrics are written by Jones, and the music is by Jacques Offenbach, with musical arrangements and additional music by Nancy Ford.

== Productions ==
Jones and Ford began work on the musical in 1965.

The musical had its Off-Broadway premiere in 2012.

A production of the musical was staged at Station Theater in Champaign, Illinois in 2012 and at the University of Miami in 2016.

== Musical numbers ==
- In Vienna - Max
- I Love To Be In Love - Anatol, Max
- The Hypnotism Song - Cora, Anatol, Max
- The Music Of Bavaria - Annie, Fritz
- Finishing With An Affair - Anatol, waiters
- The Oyster Waltz - Annie, waiters
- Come Buy A Trinket - Peddlers
- There's A Room - Anatol, Gabriele
- Anatol's Last Night - Anatol
- Love Conquers All - Ilona, Anatol, Max
- Listen To The Rain - Ilona
- Seasons - Max
- It's For The Young - Anatol, Max
- Menage-A-Trois - Baron Diebel
- There's A Flower I Wear - Annette
- The Game Of Love - All

== Main characters ==
- Anatol - the protagonist
- Max - Anatol's friend
- Cora - a love interest of Anatol
- Annie - a love interest of Anatol
- Gabriele - a former lover of Anatol
- Ilona - a love interest of Anatol
- Annette - a love interest of Anatol
- Baron Diebel - an aging playboy
