= Cold Feet (American TV series) =

- Genre: Comedy drama
- Based on: Cold Feet by Mike Bullen
- Developed by: Kerry Ehrin
- Starring: David Sutcliffe; Jean Louisa Kelly; William Keane; Dina Spybey; Anthony Starke; Alicia Coppola
- Composer: David Schwartz
- Country of origin: United States
- Original language: English
- No. of seasons: 1
- No. of episodes: 8 (4 unaired)

Production
- Executive producers: Kerry Ehrin; Scott Siegler; Rob Thompson
- Producer: Mark A. Burley
- Production locations: Vancouver, British Columbia, Canada
- Running time: 60 minutes
- Production companies: Kerry Ehrin Productions; Granada Entertainment; NBC Studios

Original release
- Network: NBC
- Release: September 24 – October 29, 1999

Cold Feet is an American comedy-drama television series produced by Kerry Ehrin Productions and Granada Entertainment USA for NBC. Based on the British TV series of the same name, the series follows three Seattle couples, each at different stages of their romantic relationships. It premiered on September 24, 1999 to mixed reviews and was canceled on October 29, 1999, one month later because of falling ratings. Eight episodes were produced, of which four aired.

== Production ==
The British production of Cold Feet first aired as a one-off television pilot in 1997. Despite low ratings and few critical reviews, it won the prestigious Rose d'Or at that year's Montreux Television Festival, and British broadcaster ITV commissioned a six-episode series of the show. Granada Entertainment USA, the American arm of the series producer Granada, tendered the series to U.S. networks and cable channels from late 1997, with the format eventually being sold to NBC, which commissioned thirteen 60-minute episodes in May 1999 for the Fall season. The series was broadcast at 10 p.m. on Friday nights, in the timeslot occupied by Homicide: Life on the Street in previous seasons. Most episodes were written by Kerry Ehrin, who strived to make the series similar to the original. The series was shot at NBC's studios in Vancouver, British Columbia.

== Characters ==
- Adam Williams (played by David Sutcliffe)
- Shelley Sullivan (played by Jean Louisa Kelly)
- Pete Lombardi (played by William Keane)
- Jenny Lombardi (played by Dina Spybey)
- David Chandler (played by Anthony Starke)
- Karen Chandler (played by Alicia Coppola)
- Ramona (played by Maria J. Cruz)

== Episodes ==
No.	Title	Directed by	Written by	Original release date	Prod. code
1	"Pilot"	Nicole Holofcener	Kerry Ehrin	September 24, 1999	63551
2	"A Thong, a Potty and a Napoleon"	Nick Marck	Kerry Ehrin	October 1, 1999	63552
3	"How Much is that Sex Act in the Window"	Rob Thompson	Kerry Ehrin	October 22, 1999	63553
4	"The Strange Loves of Shelley Bumstead"	Joe Napolitano	Kerry Ehrin & Craig Munson	October 29, 1999	63554
5	"An Affair to Dismember"	TBD	TBD	Unaired	63555
6	"I've Got a Crush on You, Frigidaire"	TBD	TBD	Unaired	63556
7	"Trying to Do the Right Thing"	TBD	TBD	Unaired	63557
8	"Girls' Night Out, Boys' Night In"	TBD	TBD	Unaired	63558

== Reception ==
=== Critics ===
Writing in Variety, Ray Richmond described the pilot as "more or less a primer on selfishness" and "breezy and entertaining", predicting the series would retain viewers in the following weeks. Entertainment Weekly called the scene in which Adam stands with a rose clenched in his buttocks the peak of the episode, but was not impressed by the series replacing Homicide. Humor website TeeVee.org echoed this sentiment, but the rose scene had the opposite effect on the reviewer, who described it as giving her "mental hypothermia". Fay Ripley, who played Jenny Gifford in the original British series, did not enjoy it, calling it "utterly shit" and criticizing the characterization of her character's American counterpart. Months after the cancellation, David Bondelvitch was nominated for a Golden Reel Award at the MPSE awards for his music from the pilot.

=== Ratings ===
The ratings for the first four episodes are:

#	Episode	Airdate	Rating	Share	18–49	Viewers	Rank
1	"Pilot"	September 24, 1999	–	–	–	8.8	68
2	"A Thong, a Potty and a Napoleon"	October 1, 1999	–	–	–	–	–
3	"How Much is that Sex Act in the Window"	October 22, 1999	2.5	8	–	5.69	–
4	"The Strange Loves of Shelley Bumstead"	October 29, 1999	3.4	6	–	–	–

The series averaged 4.9/9 for the four weeks it was on air, with "How Much is that Sex Act in the Window" bringing NBC its worst-ever homes rating for an original Friday night show. Following the broadcast of "The Strange Loves of Shelley Bumstead", NBC announced the series was cancelled. Granada cited the two-week hiatus between episodes two and three as the main reason for the loss of viewers.
