= The Ed Ames Album =

Studio album by Ed Ames
- Released: October 1964
- Studios: RCA Victor's Studio "A", New York City, New York
- Genre: Pop
- Length: 33:06
- Label: RCA Victor
- Producer: Jim Foglesong

Ed Ames chronology
Opening Night with Ed Ames (1964)	The Ed Ames Album (1964)	My Kind of Songs (1965)

Singles from The Ed Ames Album
- 1. "Love Is Here to Stay" Released: December 1964

The Ed Ames Album is a self-titled studio album by American singer and actor Ed Ames released in late 1964. It was his second original album for RCA Victor Records, produced by Jim Foglesong. It contained a total of 12 tracks, including one single. The album received a positive critical reception following its release, though it missed the US album charts.

== Background, recording and content ==
Ed Ames had been a recording artist for RCA Victor since the 1950s, gaining prominence during his time with the Ames Brothers. The Ed Ames Album followed his debut Opening Night with Ed Ames, which contained his first charting single. The self-titled LP was Ames' first to be produced by Jim Foglesong, and was his only one recorded at RCA Victor's Studio "A", located in New York City, New York. Foglesong would produce for Ames for the rest of the decade.

The Ed Ames Album consisted of 12 tracks in total. Selections included various musical and film songs, such as "I've Grown Accustomed to Her Face" from My Fair Lady, "Monica" from The Carpetbaggers, "Gigi" from the Award-winning namesake film, and "It's Magic" from Romance on the High Seas. "Love Is Here to Stay" was a standard from the MGM film The Goldwyn Follies (1938) and "Willow Weep for Me" was a jazz standard which became a pop hit in 1964. "What Now My Love" was a popular pop hit at the time.

== Release ==
The album was originally released in October 1964 by RCA Victor. It was the second studio album of Ames' career. The label originally offered it as a vinyl LP, with six songs on "Side A" and six songs on "Side B". It was available in stereo and monaural sound. Since then, it has been digitized onto streaming platforms in the 2020s as well.

== Critical reception ==
Professional ratings
Review scores
Source	Rating
Billboard	Positive (Special Merit Pop Spotlight)
The Virgin Encyclopedia of Popular Music	4/5 stars

The album was given a positive review from Billboard magazine following its original release. Putting the album in its "Special Merit Pop Spotlight" section, the publication stated that "Ed Ames has come a long way since he was one of the singing Ames Brothers. Broadway and TV work, as an actor and as a singer, has broadened his style, delivery and impact." They said, "to listeners, seeking a warm, romantic album of outstanding songs, like 'Gigi" and 'Fly Me to the Moon;' need look no further if they want them sung by an outstanding talent." Retrospectively, The Virgin Encyclopedia of Popular Music gave the album a four-star rating, which meant that the album was of "high standard" and "therefore recommended."

== Track listing ==
Side one
No.	Title	Writer(s)	Length
1.	"It's Magic"	Jule Styne; Sammy Cahn	2:32
2.	"Gigi"	Alan Jay Lerner; Frederick Loewe	3:35
3.	"Love Is Here to Stay"	George Gershwin; Ira Gershwin	2:09
4.	"Can't Get Out of This Mood"	Frank Loesser; Jimmy McHugh	2:52
5.	"I've Grown Accustomed to Her Face"	Alan Jay Lerner; Frederick Loewe	3:20
6.	"Strong as a Mountain"	Johnny Marks	2:12
Total length:			16:40

Side two
No.	Title	Writer(s)	Length
1.	"You Will Wear Velvet"	Buddy Kaye; Ben Raleigh	2:20
2.	"Willow Weep for Me"	Ann Ronell	3:03
3.	"But Beautiful"	Jimmy Van Heusen; Johnny Burke	3:00
4.	"Monica"	Bob Shuman; Bernie Wayne	2:13
5.	"What Now My Love"	Carl Sigman; Gilbert Bécaud; Pierre Delanoë	2:55
6.	"Fly Me to the Moon"	Bart Howard	2:55
Total length:			16:26

== Release history ==
Region	Date	Format	Label	Ref.
North America	October 1964	LP Stereo; LP Mono	RCA Victor Records	
Worldwide	Circa 2020	Music download; streaming	Sony Music Entertainment	

== Personnel ==
All credits are adapted from the liner notes of The Ed Ames Album.

- Ed Ames – vocals
- Harvey Siders – liner notes
- Frank Hunter, (tracks: A3, A4, B2, B5) – arranger, conductor
- Marty Manning, (tracks: A1, A2, A5-B1, B3, B4, B6) – arranger, conductor
- Jim Foglesong – producer
- Ed Begley – recording engineer
