= Emily Arnold McCully =

American writer and illustrator (born 1939)

Emily Arnold McCully (born July 1, 1939) is an American writer and illustrator who is best known for children's books. She won the annual Caldecott Medal for U.S. picture book illustration in 1993 recognizing Mirette on the High Wire which she also wrote.

== Biography ==
Arnold was born in Galesburg, Illinois, but grew up in Garden City, New York. She graduated from Pembroke College, now a part of Brown University, in 1961 and earned an M.A. in Art History from Columbia University. At Brown she acted in the inaugural evening of Production Workshop and other plays, co-wrote the 1960 Brownbrokers musical Happily Never After with Elizabeth Diggs, and earned a Phi Beta Kappa key.

In 1976, she published a short story in The Massachusetts Review. It was selected for the O'Henry Collection: Best Short Stories of the Year. Two novels followed: A Craving in 1982, and Life Drawing in 1986. In 2012, McCully published Ballerina Swan with Holiday House Books for Young People, written by legendary prima ballerina Allegra Kent. It has received rave reviews from The New York Times, Kirkus Reviews, and School Library Journal.

As an actor, she performed in Equity productions of Elizabeth Diggs’ Saint Florence at Capital Repertory Theatre in Albany, NY and The Vineyard Theater in New York City.

She lives in Chatham with her partner, playwright Elizabeth Diggs.

Among other awards and honors, McCully has received a Christopher Award for Picnic, the two children's book of Caldecott Medal for Mirette on the High Wire, the Jane Addams Award, the Giverney Award, and an honorary doctorate from Brown University.

== Partial bibliography ==
=== Children's picture books ===
- MA nDA LA (1971)
- Black is brown is tan (1973)
- The Bed Book (1976)
- The New Friend (1981), by Charlotte Zolotow
- Beautiful Warrior: The Legend of the Nun's Kung Fu (1998)
- Grandmas series
  - The Grandma Mix-Up (1988)
  - Grandmas at the Lake (1990)
  - Grandmas at Bat (1993)
  - The Mixed-Up Grandmas Treasury (1997)
  - Grandmas Trick-Or-Treat (2001)
- Mirette Series
  - Mirette on the High Wire (1992)
  - Starring Mirette & Bellini (1997)
  - Mirette and Bellini Cross Niagara Falls (2000)
- The Pirate Queen (1998)
- Hurry! (2000)
- Mouse Practice (2001)
- The orphan singer (2002)
- Battle for St. Michaels (2002)
- Picnic (2003)
- First Snow (2004)
- Squirrel and John Muir (2004)
- School (2005)
- The Bobbin Girl (2009)
- Ballerina Swan (2012), written by Allegra Kent
- Popcorn at the Palace (2014)
- Clara : the (mostly) true story of the rhinoceros who dazzled kings, inspired artists, and won the hearts of everyone ... while she ate her way up and down a continent!

=== Children's non-fiction ===
- Manjiro: The Boy Who Risked His Life for Two Countries (2008)
- My Heart Glow: Alice Cogswell, Thomas Gallaudet, and the Birth of American Sign Language (2008)
- The Secret Cave: Discovering Lascaux (2010)
- Wonder Horse: The True Story of the World's Smartest Horse (2013), non-fiction picture book about Beautiful Jim Key.
- Marvelous Mattie: How Margaret E. Knight Became an Inventor (2013)
- Strongheart: The World's First Movie Star Dog (2014)
- Queen of the Diamond: The Lizzie Murphy Story (2015)
- Caroline's Comets: A True Story (2017), biography of Caroline Herschel.
