= Tom Jones (lyricist) =

American lyricist and librettist (1928–2023)

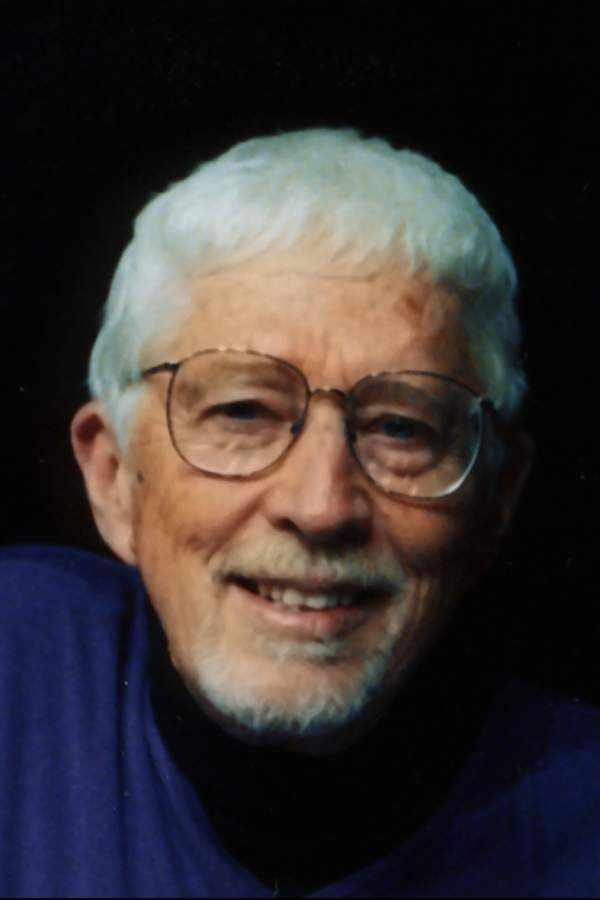
- Jones in 2008
- Born: February 17, 1928; Littlefield, Texas, U.S.
- Died: August 11, 2023 (aged 95); Sharon, Connecticut, U.S.
- Education: University of Texas at Austin
- Occupations: Lyricist and librettist

Thomas Collins Jones (February 17, 1928 – August 11, 2023) was an American lyricist and librettist, best known for The Fantasticks, 110 in the Shade, and I Do! I Do!.

== Early life ==
Jones was born in Littlefield, Texas, on February 17, 1928. He was raised in Coleman, Texas, the son of a turkey farmer (his father William) and a homemaker (his mother Jessie). During his adolescence, he worked as an usher in a movie theater and attended the University of Texas at Austin, where he was involved in its theatre department. He attained a master's degree from the university in 1951. All of Jones's major musicals were written with Harvey Schmidt, whom he met at the university.

== Career ==
His best-known work is The Fantasticks, which ran off-Broadway from 1960 until 2002, and the hit song from the same, "Try to Remember". Other songs from The Fantasticks include "Soon It's Gonna Rain", "Much More", and "I Can See It". He also wrote the screenplay for the 1995 feature-film adaptation.

Jones acted in a New York City revival of The Fantasticks, which he also directed. He played the part of the Old Actor, from when the musical opened in 1960, and from April 26, 2010, to June 6, 2010. He was credited as an actor in the show as Thomas Bruce.

Jones was also the author of Making Musicals: An Informal Introduction to the World of Musical Theater, about which Elyse Sommer wrote on January 15, 1998 in CurtainUp:

Extremely well organized and packed with interesting information, the first half of the book deals in broad and general terms with the growth and development of the American musical. The second half focuses on the practical "how-to" of putting together a musical, using Jones's own career and shows he's worked on as a springboard ... Since only half the book falls within the category of how-to I'm glad to report that this advice is stick-to-the-ribs solid. No hyperbole. No gratuitous name dropping.

== Personal life and death ==
Jones was first married to Eleanor Wright; the two later divorced. Jones went on to marry choreographer Janet Watson. The couple had two children, Michael and Sam Jones. Watson died in 2016.

Jones died from cancer on August 11, 2023, at the age of 95.

== Theater credits ==
- Shoestring '57 (contributor) (1957)
- Demi-Dozen (contributor) (1958) (For the titles of his contributions, see "Discography" in Julius Monk.)
- The Fantasticks (1960)
- 110 in the Shade (1963; book by N. Richard Nash, based on his play The Rainmaker)
- I Do! I Do! (1966; based on The Fourposter by Jan de Hartog)
- Celebration (1969)
- Colette (1970)
- Philemon (1973)
- Grover's Corners (1987; based on Our Town)
- Mirette (1996; book by Elizabeth Diggs, based on the children's book Mirette on the High Wire by Emily Arnold McCully)
- Roadside (2001; book by Jones, based on the 1929 play of the same name by Lynn Riggs, with music by Harvey Schmidt)
- Harold and Maude (2004; music by Joseph Thalken, based on the film)
- The Game of Love (2012; music by Jacques Offenbach with arrangements and additional music by Nancy Ford, based on the Anatol plays by Arthur Schnitzler).
