= Mirette on the High Wire =

1992 picture book by Emily Arnold McCully

- Front cover showing the Caldecott Medal, designed by Emily A. McCully
- Author: Emily Arnold McCully
- Illustrator: Emily Arnold McCully
- Cover artist: McCully
- Genre: Children's picture book
- Publisher: Putnam Books
- Publication date: 1992
- Publication place: United States
- ISBN: 978-0-399-22130-9
- OCLC: 24544979
- Dewey Decimal: [E] 20
- LC Class: PZ7.M478415 Mi 1992

Mirette on the High Wire is a children's picture book written and illustrated by Emily Arnold McCully. Published in 1992, the book tells the story of Mirette, a French girl who learns to walk on the tightrope. McCully won the 1993 Caldecott Medal for her illustrations.

== Plot summary ==
Mirette lives in her mother's boarding house in Paris. One day her life is changed by a man named Bellini, a famous tightrope walker, who teaches Mirette how to walk on a tightrope. Bellini has stopped performing because he is afraid, but Mirette helps him overcome his fear, and they perform together for happy crowds.

== Musical ==
Tom Jones and Harvey Schmidt, best known for their long-running off-Broadway musical The Fantasticks, created a musical version of the book in 1996.

== In film ==
A 1993 animated cartoon short narrated by the author was released by Scholastic Inc., and Weston Woods.

Awards
Preceded by Tuesday	Caldecott Medal recipient 1993	Succeeded by Grandfather's Journey
