= Try to Remember =

Song from the musical The Fantasticks

Single by Ed Ames

from the album Opening Night with Ed Ames
- B-side: "Love Is Here to Stay"
- Released: December 1964
- Studio: Webster Hall
- Genre: Traditional pop
- Length: 2:35
- Label: RCA Victor
- Songwriters: Tom Jones (lyrics), Harvey Schmidt (music)
- Producer: Andy Wiswell

Ed Ames singles chronology
"Give Me Back My Life" (1964)	"Try to Remember" (1964)	"Dio Mio" (1965)

"Try to Remember" is a song about nostalgia from the musical comedy play The Fantasticks (1960). It is the first song performed in the show, encouraging the audience to imagine what the sparse set suggests. The words were written by the American lyricist Tom Jones while Harvey Schmidt composed the music.

== Popular charts and early recordings ==
"Try to Remember" was sung by Jerry Orbach in the original off-Broadway production of The Fantasticks. In early 1964, Ed Ames recorded it for Opening Night with Ed Ames, later releasing it as a single, and it became his first solo charting release. It reached No. 73 on the Billboard Hot 100, and the top-20 on their Easy Listening survey. Roger Williams and the Brothers Four made the bottom half of the chart with their versions the same year. "Try to Remember" was the first Australian success for the trio New World. Their version peaked at No. 11 in late 1968.

In 1975, Gladys Knight & the Pips had an international success with their version of "Try to Remember", combining it into a medley with a cover version of Barbra Streisand's "The Way We Were". It reached No. 11 on the US Hot 100 chart and No. 4 in the UK (their biggest success there). For Knight's version, she recited some of the lyrics from "Try to Remember" in spoken-word fashion before beginning to sing "The Way We Were".
