= Harvey Schmidt =

American composer and illustrator (1929–2018)

Harvey Lester Schmidt
- Born: September 12, 1929; Dallas, Texas, United States
- Died: February 28, 2018 (aged 88); Tomball, Texas, United States
- Education: University of Texas
- Occupation: Theatre composer
- Known for: Musical Theatre, illustrator
- Awards: Inductee American Theatre Hall of Fame; Songwriters Hall of Fame

Harvey Lester Schmidt (September 12, 1929 – February 28, 2018) was an American composer for musical theatre and illustrator. He was best known for composing the music for the longest running musical in history, The Fantasticks, which ran off-Broadway for 42 years, from 1960 to 2002.

== Biography ==
Schmidt was born in Dallas, Texas. He attended the University of Texas to study art, but when he met Tom Jones at the university, he started to accompany the drama student on the piano. They soon started writing musicals together, the first being a revue. However, after serving in the Army, Schmidt moved to New York and worked as a graphic artist for NBC Television and later as an illustrator for Life, Harper's Bazaar, Sports Illustrated, and Fortune.

All of Schmidt's major musicals were written with lyricist Tom Jones. The duo is best known for the musical The Fantasticks, which ran for 42 years off-Broadway, from 1960 to 2002 for a total of 17,162 performances. He also collaborated on the 1995 feature film adaptation. In 1992, Schmidt received a Tony Award honor for The Fantasticks, then in its 33rd year.

Jones and Schmidt followed with the Broadway musical 110 in the Shade in 1963, which ran for 330 performances on Broadway and earned a Tony Award nomination for Best Composer and Lyricist for Schmidt and Jones. I Do! I Do! followed in 1966, which brought Mary Martin and Robert Preston to the Broadway stage in a two-person musical and ran for 560 performances. Jones and Schmidt were nominated for the Tony Award for Best Composer and Lyricist and Best Musical.

They both appeared in a revue of their songs, The Show Goes On, at the York Theatre Company in 1997. The run was extended several times and the show was recorded on the DRG label.

Schmidt and Jones wrote a musical based on Thornton Wilder's Our Town, which took the duo thirteen years to write, only to have the rights rescinded by Wilder’s nephew.|

== Honours ==
Schmidt was inducted into the American Theatre Hall of Fame. His recording, Harvey Schmidt Plays Jones and Schmidt, was released in 2005.

Schmidt and Jones were both inducted into the Songwriters Hall of Fame in July 2012.

== Songs ==
- "I Can See It" from the musical The Fantasticks; later recorded by Barbra Streisand
- "Much More" from the musical The Fantasticks; later recorded by Barbra Streisand for The Barbra Streisand Album
- "Soon It's Gonna Rain" from the musical The Fantasticks; later recorded by Barbra Streisand for The Barbra Streisand Album
- "Try To Remember" from the musical The Fantasticks
- "What is a Woman?" from the musical I Do! I Do!, later recorded by Peggy Lee
- "My Cup Runneth Over" from the musical I Do! I Do!, later recorded by Bing Crosby and Ed Ames.

== Theatre ==
- Shoestring '57 (1957)
- Demi-Dozen (1958)
- The Fantasticks (1960)
- New York Scrapbook (1961 TV Special)
- 110 in the Shade (1963)
- I Do! I Do! (1966)
- Celebration (1969)
- The Bone Room (1968)
- Colette (1970)
- Bad Company (1972) (score for non-musical film)
- Philemon (1973)
- Colette Collage (1982 revision)
- Grovers Corners (1987)
- Mirette (1996)
- The Show Goes On (1997)
- Roadside (2001)

== See also ==
- Mirette on the High Wire
