= Jim Foglesong =

American country music executive (1922–2013)

Jim Fogelsong
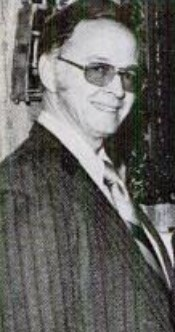
- Born: James Staton Foglesong; July 26, 1922; Lundale, West Virginia, U.S.
- Died: July 9, 2013 (aged 90); Nashville, Tennessee, U.S.
- Occupation: Country music executive
- Years active: 1951-2012
- Known for: President of Dot, ABC, Capitol and MCA Records

James Staton Foglesong (July 26, 1922 – July 9, 2013) was an American country music producer and executive from the 1950s until the 1990s, based in Nashville, Tennessee.

== Early life ==
Foglesong was born in Lundale, West Virginia. As a teenager, he sang on a local radio show and in quartets and trios into his young adult years. He was a World War II veteran with the United States Army and a graduate of the Eastman School of Music in Rochester, New York.

== Career ==
He began his career in the music industry at Columbia Records' label in 1951, transferring 78 RPM records into LP formats. Over the next 20 years, he worked for RCA-Victor until moving to Nashville in 1970 to head the A&R division at Dot Records. He was named president of Dot in 1973 — the only president of a major Nashville label at the time, where he changed the company's vision from pop to country.

He helped lay the foundation for the country music boom in the 1990s. As president of Dot, ABC, Capitol and MCA Records, he signed popular artists, among them Barbara Mandrell, Don Williams, Garth Brooks, Donna Fargo, Reba McEntire, The Oak Ridge Boys, Con Hunley, George Strait, Tanya Tucker, Sawyer Brown, Suzy Bogguss, and Kevin Morris.

In Nashville, the records Fogelsong promoted won 46 Grammy, CMA and ACM awards. He was inducted into the Country Music Hall of Fame in 2004.

== Personal life and death ==
After retiring from the active recording industry, he became head of the music business department of Trevecca Nazarene University in Nashville. He also taught a Business of Music class at Vanderbilt University.

He died on July 9, 2013, at the age of 90. He is survived by wife of 62 years, Toni, and their four children.
