= Alphaville discography =

Band discography

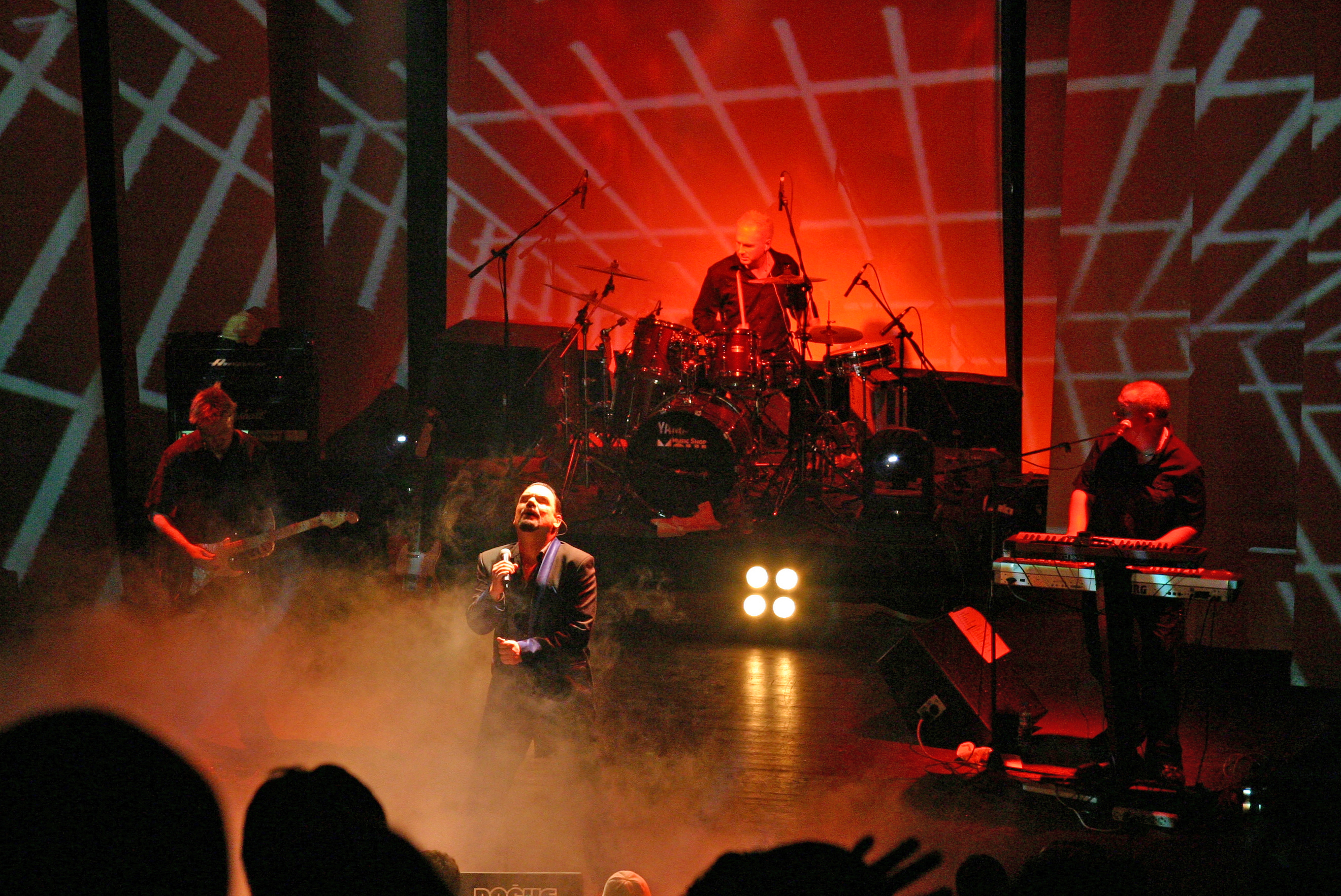
- Alphaville in 2005
- Studio albums: 8
- Live albums: 1
- Compilation albums: 6
- Singles: 29
- Video albums: 3
- Music videos: 17
- Remix albums: 1
- Box sets: 3

The discography of German synth-pop group Alphaville.

== Albums ==
=== Studio albums ===
Title	Album details	Peak chart positions										Certifications
Title	Album details	GER	AUT	CAN	FIN	NL	NOR	SPA	SWE	SWI	US	Certifications
Forever Young	Released: 27 September 1984; Label: WEA; Formats: CD, LP, MC	3	16	60	5	12	1	15	1	4	180	GER: 3× Gold; NOR: Gold; SWE: Platinum; SWI: Gold
Afternoons in Utopia	Released: 5 June 1986; Label: WEA; Formats: CD, LP, MC	13	—	82	21	51	8	—	7	12	174	
The Breathtaking Blue	Released: 4 April 1989; Label: WEA; Formats: CD, LP, MC	23	—	—	34	—	—	—	—	—	—	
Prostitute	Released: 26 August 1994; Label: WEA; Formats: CD, MC	78	—	—	—	—	—	—	—	—	—	
Salvation	Released: 1 September 1997; Label: WEA; Formats: CD, MC	66	—	—	—	—	—	—	—	—	—	
Catching Rays on Giant	Released: 19 November 2010; Label: Universal/We Love Music; Formats: CD, CD+DVD, LP, digital download	9	64	—	—	—	—	—	—	59	—	
Strange Attractor	Released: 7 April 2017; Label: Polydor; Formats: CD, 2×LP, digital download	39	—	—	—	—	—	—	—	94	—	
Eternally Yours	Released: 23 September 2022; Label: Neue Meister; Formats: 2×CD, 3×LP, MC, digital download; Reworkings of hits with the Deutsches Filmorchester Babelsberg	2	33	—	—	—	—	—	—	27	—	
"—" denotes releases that did not chart or were not released in that territory.

=== Live albums ===
Title	Album details
Stark Naked and Absolutely Live	Released: 26 June 2000; Label: Navigator Music; Formats: CD

=== Remix albums ===
Title	Album details	Peak chart positions
Title	Album details	GER
Forever Pop	Released: 22 October 2001; Label: Warner; Formats: CD, MC	59

=== Compilation albums ===
Title	Album details	Peak chart positions				Certifications
Title	Album details	GER	AUT	FIN	SWE	Certifications
Alphaville Amiga Compilation	Released: January 1988; Label: Amiga; Formats: LP, MC; East Germany-only release	—	—	—	—	
Alphaville: The Singles Collection	Released: 18 October 1988; Label: Atlantic; Formats: CD, LP, MC; North America-only release	—	—	—	—	
First Harvest 1984–92	Released: 23 March 1992; Label: WEA; Formats: CD, LP, MC	—	—	2	13	BRA: Gold; FIN: Gold; SWE: Gold
History	Released: January 1993; Label: Self-released; Formats: CD; Fanclub-only release	—	—	—	—	
Visions of Dreamscapes	Released: September 1999; Label: Aphex Music; Formats: CD; Brazil-only release	—	—	—	—	
So80s presents Alphaville	Released: 31 October 2014; Label: Soundcolours; Formats: 2×CD, digital download	26	—	—	—	
Forever! Best of 40 Years	Released: 27 September 2024; Label: WM Germany; Formats: 3×CD, digital download, vinyl	8	47	—	—	
"—" denotes releases that did not chart or were not released in that territory.

=== Box sets ===
Title	Album details
Dreamscapes	Released: January 1999; Label: Navigator Music; Formats: 8×CD; Limited release
CrazyShow	Released: 29 January 2003; Label: Alphaville; Formats: 4×CD; Limited release
Live at the Whisky a Go Go	Released: January 2019; Label: LA Concert Group; Formats: 5×CD+2×DVD+2×Blu-ray

== Singles ==
Title	Year	P eak chart positions										Certifications	Album
Title	Year	GER	AUT	DEN	FIN	SA	SPA	SWE	SWI	UK	US	Certifications	Album
"Big in Japan"	1984	1	4	—	18	5	2	1	1	8	66	GER: Gold	Forever Young
"Sounds Like a Melody"	1984	3	3	6	—	2	5	1	4	—	—	GER: Gold	Forever Young
"Forever Young"	1984	4	42 (Note: "Forever Young" first charted in Austria in 2024.)	10	24	7	14	1	3	98	65 (Note: "Forever Young" peaked on the Hot 100 at number 93 in 1985 and number 65 in 1988.)	GER: Gold; DEN: Gold; UK: Gold; RIAA: 2× Platinum	Forever Young
"Jet Set"	1985	11	—	11	—	—	—	17	13	—	—		Forever Young
"Dance with Me"	1986	11	25	3	9	4	27	5	9	—	—		Afternoons in Utopia
"Universal Daddy"	1986	36	—	12	19	—	—	—	26	—	—		Afternoons in Utopia
"Jerusalem"	1986	57	—	—	—	—	—	—	—	—	—		Afternoons in Utopia
"Sensations"	1986	—	—	—	—	—	—	—	—	—	—		Afternoons in Utopia
"Red Rose"	1987	—	—	—	—	—	—	—	—	—	—		Afternoons in Utopia
"Romeos"	1989	45	—	—	—	—	—	—	—	—	—		The Breathtaking Blue
"Summer Rain"	1989	—	—	—	—	—	—	—	—	—	—		The Breathtaking Blue
"Mysteries of Love"	1990	—	—	—	—	—	—	—	—	—	—		The Breathtaking Blue
"Big in Japan 1992 A.D."	1992	—	—	—	3	—	—	15	—	—	—		First Harvest 1984–92
"Fools"	1994	70	—	—	10	—	—	—	—	—	—		Prostitute
"The Impossible Dream"	1994	—	—	—	—	—	—	—	—	—	—		Prostitute
"Wishful Thinking"	1997	—	—	—	—	—	—	—	—	—	—		Salvation
"Flame"	1997	—	—	—	—	—	—	—	—	—	—		Salvation
"Monkey in the Moon"	1998	—	—	—	—	—	—	—	—	—	—		Salvation
"Soul Messiah" (US-only release)	1999	—	—	—	—	—	—	—	—	—	—		Salvation
"Dance with Me 2001" (Paul van Dyk remix)	2001	—	—	—	—	—	—	—	—	—	—		Forever Pop
"Forever Young 2001" (limited fan edition)	2001	—	—	—	—	—	—	—	—	—	—		Forever Pop
"Elegy"	2003	—	—	—	—	—	—	—	—	—	—		
"Criminal Girl"	2005	—	—	—	—	—	—	—	—	—	—		
"Forever Young" (Bill Hamel remix; Australia-only release)	2006	—	—	—	—	—	—	—	—	—	—		Non-album single
"I Die for You Today"	2010	15	64	—	—	—	—	—	—	—	—		Catching Rays on Giant
"Song for No One"	2011	50	—	—	—	—	—	—	—	—	—		Catching Rays on Giant
"Heartbreak City"	2017	—	—	—	—	—	—	—	—	—	—		Strange Attractor
"Love Will Find a Way"	2018	—	—	—	—	—	—	—	—	—	—		Non-album single
"Summer in Berlin" (Schiller x Alphaville)	2021	—	—	—	—	—	—	—	—	—	—		Summer in Berlin (by Schiller)
"Big in Japan" (Symphonic Version)	2022	—	—	—	—	—	—	—	—	—	—		Eternally Yours
"Forever Young" (with David Guetta and Ava Max)	2024	10	36	—	—	—	—	70	34	—	90		Non-album single
"—" denotes releases that did not chart or were not released in that territory.

== Videography ==
=== Video albums ===
Title	Album details
The Breathtaking Blue Songlines	Released: September 1989; Label: Warner Music Vision; Formats: VHS, LD
MoonOffice Compilation	Released: 1993; Label: MoonOffice; Formats: VHS; Fanclub-only release
Little America	Released: 28 September 2001; Label: Alphaville/Harper & Co./Savage Pictures; Formats: DVD

=== Music videos ===
Year	Title	Director	Album
1984	"Big in Japan"	Dieter Meier	Forever Young
1984	"Sound Like a Melody"	Unknown	Forever Young
1984	"Forever Young"	Brian Ward	Forever Young
1985	"Jet Set"	Karl Danguillier	Forever Young
1985	"Dance with Me"	Karl Danguillier	Afternoons in Utopia
1986	"Universal Daddy"	Unknown	Afternoons in Utopia
1987	"Red Rose"	Guylas Buda	Afternoons in Utopia
1992	"Big in Japan 1992 A.D."	Unknown	First Harvest 1984–92
1994	"Fools"	Scott Kennedy	Prostitute
2001	"Forever Young" (Dance Remix)	Cartoon Saloon	Forever Pop
2010	"I Die for You Today"	Sandra Marschner	Catching Rays on Giant
2011	"Song for No One"	Frank Sennholz	Catching Rays on Giant
2017	"Heartbreak City"	Unknown	Strange Attractor
2022	"Big in Japan" (Symphonic Version)	Jürgen Schindler	Eternally Yours
2022	"Sounds Like a Melody" (Symphonic Version)	Alex Schroer	Eternally Yours
2022	"Forever Young" (Symphonic Version)	Jürgen Schindler	Eternally Yours
2024	"Forever Young" (with David Guetta and Ava Max)	Gemma Yin	non-album
