= Prostitute (Alphaville album) =

Studio album by Alphaville
- Released: 26 August 1994
- Studios: Lunapark Studios, Berlin
- Genre: Synth-pop
- Length: 70:46
- Label: Warner Music
- Producer: Alphaville

Alphaville chronology
History (1993)	Prostitute (1994)	Salvation (1997)

Singles from Prostitute
- 1. "Fools" Released: July 1994; 2. "The Impossible Dream" Released: December 1994

Professional ratings
Review scores
Source	Rating
AllMusic	4/5 stars

Prostitute is the fourth studio album by German synth-pop band Alphaville, released in 1994. The album was reissued in a remastered and expanded edition in November 2023.

== Overview ==
Following the "science-fiction-themed" Afternoons in Utopia and the "lushly orchestrated" The Breathtaking Blue albums, this was Alphaville's first release in five years. Having "a great variety of styles", this "jazzy and EDM-influenced", "dark, theatrical album" proved "too abstract to achieve" much success. The lack of commercial appeal led the band to return to its synth/dance roots with the following album, Salvation.

In 2019 Marian Gold recommended Prostitute, along with the 2017 Strange Attractor, to anyone who only knew Alphaville from Big In Japan.

It is the last Alphaville album with Ricky Echolette.

== Critical reception ==
Pan-European magazine Music & Media wrote, "Sometimes called Germany's answer to Japan and Depeche Mode, this trio is now likely to enjoy their first real success since their 1984 global smash 'Big in Japan'. Apart from the 'Fools' single, which is making some promising radio inroads currently, the album contains potential airplay candidates such as 'Beethoven', the ballad 'The Impossible Dream' and the reggae-based 'Faith'."

== Track listing ==
No.	Title	Lyrics	Music	Length
1.	"The Paradigm Shift"	Marian Gold, Bernhard Lloyd, Ricky Echolette	Gold, Lloyd, Echolette	3:47
2.	"Fools"	Gold, Lloyd, Echolette	Gold, Lloyd, Echolette	3:53
3.	"Beethoven"	Gold, Lloyd, Echolette	Gold, Lloyd, Echolette	5:35
4.	"Ascension Day"	Gold, Lloyd, Echolette	Gold, Lloyd, Rainer Bloss	5:45
5.	"The Impossible Dream"	Gold, Lloyd, Echolette, Eric Sooter	Gold, Lloyd, Bloss	4:49
6.	"Parade"	Gold, Lloyd, Echolette	Gold, Lloyd, Echolette	3:40
7.	"Ain't It Strange"	Gold, Lloyd, Echolette	Gold, Lloyd, Bloss	5:23
8.	"All in the Golden Afternoon"	Gold, Lloyd, Echolette	Gold, Lloyd, Bloss	3:35
9.	"Oh Patti"	Gold, Lloyd, Echolette	Gold, Lloyd, Bloss	1:46
10.	"Ivory Tower"	Gold, Lloyd, Echolette	Gold, Lloyd, Bloss	3:16
11.	"Faith"	Gold, Lloyd, Echolette	Gold, Lloyd, Bloss	3:56
12.	"Iron John"	Gold, Lloyd, Echolette, Rudy Nielson	Gold, Lloyd, Echolette	3:44
13.	"The One Thing"	Gold, Lloyd, Echolette	Gold, Lloyd, Echolette	3:55
14.	"Some People"	Gold, Lloyd, Echolette, Julie Ocean	Gold, Lloyd, Bloss	4:37
15.	"Euphoria"	Gold, Lloyd, Echolette	Gold, Lloyd, Echolette	7:05
16.	"Apollo"	Gold, Lloyd, Echolette	Gold, Lloyd, Bloss	6:10

=== 2023 Remaster ===
Disc two
No.	Title	Length
1.	"Fools (Single Version)"	3:53
2.	"Fools (Seven Seals)"	3:59
3.	"Fools (Faithful and True)"	4:17
4.	"Fools (Twelve Inch)"	5:42
5.	"The Impossible Dream (Single Version)"	3:41
6.	"The Impossible Dream (Projection Mix)"	3:51
7.	"Fools (Twelve Inch Berlin)"	6:39
8.	"Fools (Twelve Inch Instrumental)"	3:42
9.	"Faith (Portobello Remix)"	4:30
10.	"All in the Golden Afternoon (Demo)"	3:33
11.	"Ain't It Strange (Demo)"	4:37
12.	"Apollo (Demo)"	6:12
13.	"The Impossible Dream (Demo)"	4:50
14.	"Fools (Alternative Mix)"	3:52
15.	"Fools (Bruce Mix)"	4:03
16.	"Fools (Revenge Big Club Mix)"	6:12
17.	"Fools (First Mix)"	4:01

== Charts ==
2023 chart performance for Prostitute
Chart (2023)	Peak position
German Albums (Offizielle Top 100)	78
Hungarian Albums (MAHASZ)	34
