= Salvation (Alphaville album) =

Studio album by Alphaville
- Released: 1 September 1997
- Studio: Eden, London, UK
- Genre: Synth-pop
- Length: 53:51 (Original); 70:18 (US Release)
- Label: Warner / Metropolis
- Producer: Andy Richards

Alphaville chronology
Prostitute (1994)	Salvation (1997)	Dreamscapes (1999)

Singles from Salvation
- 1. "Wishful Thinking" Released: February 1997; 2. "Flame" Released: June 1997; 3. "Soul Messiah" Released: 1999

Alternative cover

Salvation is the fifth album by German synth-pop band Alphaville and was released in 1997. Three tracks from the album were released as singles: "Wishful Thinking", "Flame", and "Soul Messiah". However, none of them charted on the German single charts. It is the last album at the Warner/metropolis label. It was also the last album with Bernhard Lloyd, who left the band in 2003.

== Overview ==
Salvation hit the stores in 1997 and marked a tumultuous time for the band: Ricky Echolette had left Alphaville during the production and Marian Gold and Bernhard Lloyd struggled with the way the record label did the promotion, calling it "not very good for us". The subsequent split led Alphaville to establishing their own, concert- and online-focused communication, promotion, and distribution platform.

Even though the circumstances for Salvation were not favorable, the album became a success in spite of the troubled production. This has been credited to the band returning to their synthpop-roots and heavily infusing them with dance/techno. There is a stylistic similarity between Forever Young and Salvation.

== Reviews ==
A departure from the experimental predecessors, Prostitute and The Breathtaking Blue, the straighter, simpler style appealed to old fans and a younger audience alike. MusicFolio's review of the album said "Their songs are still stirring and swirling with the drum machine pumping out a hectic flow of beats. 'Flame 'is the first single, a yearning ballad that grows to an arms-waving conclusion, 'Wishful Thinking', 'Point Of Know Return' (sic) and 'Inside Out' are more representative of the Alphaville sound."

== Release and promotion ==
Alphaville toured in support of the album, including playing their first ever tour dates in North America in July 1999, captured in a live video release, Little America (1999). The album was reissued in a remastered and expanded edition in November 2023.

== Track listing ==
No.	Title	Length
1.	"Inside Out"	5:17
2.	"Monkey in the Moon"	3:53
3.	"Guardian Angel"	4:14
4.	"Wishful Thinking"	3:48
5.	"Flame"	3:49
6.	"Point of Know Return"	5:52
7.	"Control"	3:31
8.	"Dangerous Places"	3:58
9.	"Spirit of the Age"	4:31
10.	"Soul Messiah"	4:53
11.	"New Horizons"	5:35
12.	"Pandora's Lullaby"	4:30

US bonus tracks
No.	Title	Length
13.	"Life Is King"	6:10
14.	"Wishful Thinking Physical" (Physical Mix)	5:54
15.	"Monkey in the Moon" (Demo)	4:23

== Personnel ==
- Marian Gold: vocals, keyboards
- Bernhard Lloyd: keyboards, programming
- Andy Richards: Keyboards, Programming
- Guitars by Tim Cransfield
- Electric Guitar on "New Horizons" by Elliott Randall
- Percussion on "Monkey in the Moon" by Chris Hughes
- String Arrangements on "Wishful Thinking" and "Flame" by Anne Dudley, recorded at Angel Recording Studios, London by Steve Price
- String Arrangement on "Pandora" by John Altman, recorded at Whitfield Studios, London by Mike Ross
- Leader of the Orchestra: Gavin Wright
- Additional Rhythm Programs by Andy Gray-Ling, Paul Simm & Henry Jackman
- Backing Vocals by Carol Kenyon & Tessa Niles
- Published by BMG Ufa
- Music written by Bernhard Lloyd, Marian Gold and Rick Echolette
- Words by Marian Gold
- Produced by Andy Richards for Sarm Productions

== Charts ==
1997 chart performance for Salvation
Chart (1997)	Peak position
Czech Republican Albums (IFPI CR)	17
German Albums (Offizielle Top 100)	74

2023 chart performance for Salvation
Chart (2023)	Peak position
German Albums (Offizielle Top 100)	66
Hungarian Albums (MAHASZ)	27
