= Red Rose (song) =

Single by Alphaville

from the album Afternoons in Utopia
- B-side: "Big Yellow Sun"; "Next Generation"
- Released: April 1987
- Recorded: March 1986
- Studio: Hansa Tonstudio, Berlin
- Genre: Synth-pop
- Length: 4:24 (7" version); 7:53 (12" Mix)
- Label: Atlantic / WEA
- Songwriters: Marian Gold; Bernhard Lloyd; Ricky Echolette
- Producer: Peter Walsh

Alphaville singles chronology
"Sensations" (1986)	"Red Rose" (1987)	"Romeos" (1989)

Red Rose is the fifth and final single from Alphaville's 1986 album, Afternoons in Utopia. It was released in April 1987, and is their ninth single overall.

== Reviews ==
Reviews for the song at the time were generally positive, with one reviewer calling this song "a reasonably sassy pop number that's one of various chances for [singer and songwriter Marian] Gold to exercise his Bryan Ferry fascination." Coincidentally, Alphaville would later cover the Bryan Ferry / Roxy Music song "Do the Strand" on their 2003 release, CrazyShow. Another reviewer stated that "Red Rose", alongside their other notable singles such as "Big in Japan" and "Jerusalem", "reside in the upper echelon of early-'80s synth pop".

== Track listings ==
7" single

1. "Red Rose (7" Version)" — 4:24
2. "Concrete Soundtracks For Imaginary Films 1: Big Yellow Sun" — 6:45

12" German single

1. "Red Rose (12" Version)" — 7:53
2. "Concrete Soundtracks For Imaginary Films 1: Big Yellow Sun" — 6:45
3. "Red Rose (Dub Mix)" — 5:06
- The B-side is referred to by alternate names including "Concrete Soundtraxx For Imaginary Films" and "Big Yello Sun." A remix appears on 1999's album Dreamscapes, and alternate demo appears on the fan-only History release

12" US single

1. "Red Rose (12" Version)" — 7:53
2. "Next Generation" — 3:58
3. "Red Rose (Dub Mix)" — 5:06
- As the previous two singles were not released in the US, that market received the B-side from the "Universal Daddy" single instead
- A remix of the US B-side appears on 1999's album Dreamscapes
- The writing credit for "Next Generation" is listed as "Gold/Lloyd/Echolette/Ryan"
- The original 12" version and the b-side "Concrete Soundtraxx for Imaginary Films 1" both appear in 2014's so80s presents Alphaville

== Charts ==
This song reached #24 on the US Hot Dance Chart in 1987.

== Other releases ==
- Alphaville Amiga Compilation, 1988 (LP version)
- Alphaville: The Singles Collection, 1988 (LP and 12" versions)
- First Harvest 1984-92, 1992 (7" version)
- Dreamscapes, 1999 (demo version)
- Forever Pop, 2001 (new remix)
