= Fools (song) =

Single by Alphaville

from the album Prostitute
- A-side: "Fools"
- Released: July 1994
- Recorded: 1989–1993
- Studio: Lunapark Studios, Berlin
- Genre: Synth-pop
- Length: 3:54
- Label: WEA
- Songwriter(s): Marian Gold; Bernhard Lloyd; Ricky Echolette
- Producer(s): Alphaville

Alphaville singles chronology
"Big in Japan 1992 A.D." (1992)	"Fools" (1994)	"The Impossible Dream" (1994)

Music video
- "Fools" on YouTube

"Fools" is a song by German synth-pop band Alphaville, released in July 1994, by WEA, as the first single from their fourth album, Prostitute (1994). It was written by Marian Gold, Bernhard Lloyd and Ricky Echolette, and produced by the band. The single became a top-40 hit in Finland and a top-70 hit in the band's native Germany. "Fools" is also their fourteenth single overall and the last Alphaville single to chart in any country until "I Die for You Today" in 2011.

== Critical reception ==
Larry Flick from Billboard magazine wrote, "Remember Alphaville? The modern-pop/dance act that is best known for the sweeping 'Forever Young' steps forward with 'Fools', a headline-conscious twirler available on WEA's German imprint. The lyrics are well-intentioned, if a tad cloying. However, the song's ear-pleasing hook and spiraling, trancetouched groove could trigger some mighty dramatic body movement..." Pan-European magazine Music & Media noted, "Life goes on after "Greatest Hits" albums, which provide the breath to redefine careers. Re-vitaminised, the German synth pop outfit reappears as a dance era answer to the Simple Minds."

== Track listings ==
- CD maxi single
1. "Fools" (Album Version) - 3:54
2. "Fools" (Seven Seals) - 3:59
3. "Fools" (Faithful & True) - 4:16
4. "Fools" (Twelve Inch) - 5:45
- CD single promo
1. "Fools" (7 inch) - 3:53
2. "Fools" (12 inch) - 5:44
- CD single promo digipack
1. "Fools" (Seven Seals) - 3:59
2. "Fools" (Faithful & True) - 4:16
- 12" maxi single vinyl
1. "Fools" (Twelve Inch) - 5:12
2. "Fools" - 3:57
3. "Fools" (Instrumental) - 5:13
- 12" German DJ promotional single
1. "Fools" (12 Inch Berlin) - 6:39
2. "Fools" (12 Inch London) - 5:11
3. "Fools" (Seven Seals) - 3:58
4. "Fools" (7 Inch) - 3:52
- This is the first single from Alphaville (barring re-releases) that did not include an original B-side track
- The "7 Inch" mix is the same as the album version
- The CD Single Promo has a black colour cover with red fangs, and not a red colour cover with white fangs as the official CD Maxi Single and the CD Single Promo Digipack has.

== Other releases ==
The "Faithful & True" and "12 Inch Berlin" remixes appeared again later on the Dreamscapes release, where the Berlin remix was re-labeled as the "Speed" remix.

== Charts ==
Weekly charts performance for "Fools"
Chart (1994)	Peak position
Finland (Suomen virallinen hittiälistalla)	40
Germany (GfK)	70
