= Jerusalem (Alphaville song) =

Single by Alphaville

from the album Afternoons in Utopia
- B-side: "Vingt Mille Lieues Sous Les Mers incl. The Nelson Highrise Sector 3: The Garage"
- Released: November 1986
- Recorded: September 1985
- Studio: Studio 54, Berlin
- Genre: Synth-pop
- Length: 3:45 (7" version); 4:09 (album version); 6:17 (The Palace Version)
- Label: Atlantic / WEA
- Songwriter(s): Marian Gold; Bernhard Lloyd; Ricky Echolette
- Producer(s): Wolfgang Loos

Alphaville singles chronology
"Universal Daddy" (1986)	"Jerusalem" (1986)	"Sensations" (1986)

"Jerusalem" is third single from Alphaville's album Afternoons in Utopia. It is their seventh single overall, although it was only made available in Germany. It was released in November 1986.

== Song development ==
In the liner notes for 1992's First Harvest 1984–92, band member Ricky Echollette had this to say about the song:

One day we were given the sketch for a theatre play, for which we were supposed to write the soundtrack. It's the story of a man, who at night convinces lonely passers-by on Brooklyn Bridge to commit suicide. He offers them as human sacrifices for his lover, who, years ago - because of him - committed suicide at the same location. In his frenzy he turns her into Eris, the Goddess of Revenge. Due to time problems, we were unable to pursue this project. But it was in that time, that 'Jerusalem' came to life.

The song was recorded and mixed at Studio 54, Berlin, in September 1985.

== Reviews ==
Overall, the song "Jerusalem" has been universally well received by critics. It was described as "the secret highlight" of the album Afternoons in Utopia, "with a wonderful chorus and an inspiring, just epic enough atmosphere." Another reviewer acknowledges that this song "is one of the most beautiful songs Alphaville has ever created." A third reviewer writes that it "reside(s) in the upper echelon of early-'80s synth pop" alongside fellow album track and subsequent single "Red Rose".

== Track listings ==
7" single

1. "Jerusalem (7" Version)" – 3:45
2. "Vingt mille lieues sous les mers incl. The Nelson Highrise Sector 3: The Garage" – 5:00

12" single

1. "Jerusalem (The Palace-Version)" – 6:17
2. "Jerusalem" – 4:21
3. "Vingt mille lieues sous les mers incl. The Nelson Highrise Sector 3: The Garage" – 5:00
- The 4:21 version of "Jerusalem" on the 12" is not given a name. It is the LP version, but does not fade at the end, instead lasting about 10 seconds longer than how it appears on the LP, and ends in a cold cut
- "Vingt mille lieues sous les mers" is French for Twenty Thousand Leagues Under the Seas
- The B-side also appears on the subsequent single, "Sensations," and a remix appears on 1999's Dreamscapes
- The original "Palace Version" and the unaltered b-side appear for the first time on CD on 2014's so80s presents Alphaville

== The Nelson Highrise Sectors ==
This single contains the third of 4 songs that Alphaville have designated a "Nelson Highrise Sector:"

- The Nelson Highrise Sector 1 is "The Elevator," the B-side to 1984's single, "Sounds Like a Melody"
- The Nelson Highrise Sector 2 is "The Other Side of U," the B-side to 1986's single "Dance With Me"
- The Nelson Highrise Sector 4 is "The Scum of the Earth," from 2003's CrazyShow

== Charts ==
The song hit #57 in Germany, the only region in which the single was officially released.

== Other releases ==
This song was released on a variety of other official Alphaville releases, including:

- First Harvest 1984-92, 1992 (7" version)
- Dreamscapes, 1999 (demo remix and live version)
- Stark Naked and Absolutely Live, 2000 (live version)
- Forever Pop, 2001 (remixes)
- Little America, 2001 (live version)
