= Jet Set (Alphaville song) =

Single by Alphaville

from the album Forever Young
- B-side: "Golden Feeling"
- Released: 1 March 1985
- Recorded: 1984
- Genre: Synth-pop, hi-NRG
- Length: 3:40 (7" version); 6:28 (Jellybean mix)
- Label: Atlantic / WEA
- Songwriter(s): Marian Gold; Bernhard Lloyd; Frank Mertens (track 1); Ricky Echolette (track 2)
- Producer(s): Colin Pearson; Wolfgang Loos

Alphaville singles chronology
"Forever Young" (1984)	"Jet Set" (1985)	"Dance with Me" (1986)

“Jet Set” is the fourth and last single from Alphaville's first album, Forever Young, and was released in March 1985.

Re-recorded and released after founding band member Frank Mertens left the band, the 7" version drops the word 'The' from the song's title and is mildly different from the original album version.

Marian Gold said of the song, "We didn't intend to write a proper song; it was supposed to be some kind of jingle that advertises things money can't buy: anarchy, freedom, love, fun and a piece of the end of the world."

== Track listings ==
7" single

1. "Jet Set (7" version)" — 3:40
2. "Golden Feeling" — 3:50

12" single

1. "Jet Set (Jellybean mix)" — 6:28
2. "Jet Set (Dub mix)" — 5:07
3. "Golden Feeling" — 3:50

Promotional 12" single

1. "Jet Set (Vocal/Jellybean mix)" - 6:28
2. "Jet Set (Dub mix)" - 5:05
- The "Vocal/Jellybean Mix" on the promotional 12" is identical to the regular 12" single's "Jellybean" mix
- A demo of the B-side "Golden Feeling" appeared on 1999's Dreamscapes

== Charts ==
Chart (1985)	Peak position
Belgium Singles Chart	26
Germany Singles Chart	11
Sweden Singles Chart	13
Switzerland Singles Chart	13

== Other releases ==
Versions of this song have appeared on a variety of other Alphaville releases, including:

1. Dreamscapes (demos and live)
2. Forever Pop (remix)
3. Little America (live)
4. First Harvest 1984-92 (remix)

The original 12" version and the b-side "Golden Feeling" were both released on 2014's So80s presents Alphaville.
