= Dance with Me (Alphaville song) =

1986 single by Alphaville

Single by Alphaville

from the album Afternoons in Utopia
- B-side: "The Nelson Highrise Sector Two: The Mirror"
- Released: March 1986
- Recorded: January 1986
- Studio: Mediasound, New York City
- Genre: Synth-pop
- Length: 4:08 (7" version); 8:18 (Empire remix)
- Label: Atlantic / WEA
- Songwriters: Marian Gold; Bernhard Lloyd; Ricky Echolette
- Producers: Steve Thompson, Michael Barbiero

Alphaville singles chronology
"Jet Set" (1985)	"Dance with Me" (1986)	"Universal Daddy" (1986)

Music video
- "Dance with Me" on YouTube

"Dance with Me" is the first of five singles from Alphaville's second album, Afternoons in Utopia. It was released in March 1986, ahead of the album. The track was a top 10 hit in Europe.

== Reviews ==
Reviews of the song are generally positive, with one reviewer acknowledging that it was a "conventional" choice for a single, while at the same time admitting it benefitted "from some great U2-inspired guitar".

== Track listings ==
7" single

1. "Dance with Me (Single version)" — 4:08
2. "The Nelson Highrise Sector 2: The Mirror" — 3:42

12" single

1. "Dance with Me (Empire remix)" — 8:18
2. "The Nelson Highrise Sector 2: The Mirror" — 3:42
- The B-side's official name on the US 12" single is: "The Nelson Highrise Sector 2: The Mirror incl. The Other Side of U / Airlines / T.O.S.O.U. (Reprise)" and is often referred to as "The Other Side of U" or "The Mirror"
- The B-side was remixed on 1999's Dreamscapes release

== Charts ==
Chart	Peak position
Austria Singles Chart	25
France Singles Chart	14
Norway Singles Chart	4
Sweden Singles Chart	5
Switzerland Singles Chart	9
US Billboard Dance/Club Play Chart	22

== Other releases ==
Versions of this song have appeared on a variety of other Alphaville releases, including:

1. Dreamscapes (remixes and live)
2. Forever Pop (remix)
3. Little America (live)
4. Dance with Me 2001 (see below)
5. First Harvest 1984–92 (single)
6. Alphaville: The Singles Collection (remix & single)

The original "Empire Remix" and the unaltered b-side "The Mirror" were included on 2014's so80s presents Alphaville.

== The Nelson Highrise Sectors ==
This single contains the second of four songs that Alphaville have designated a "Nelson Highrise Sector"

- The Nelson Highrise Sector 1 is "The Elevator", the B-side to 1984's single, "Sounds Like a Melody"
- The Nelson Highrise Sector 3 is "The Garage", the B-side to 1986's singles, "Jerusalem" and "Sensations"
- The Nelson Highrise Sector 4 is "The Scum of the Earth", from 2003's CrazyShow

== Dance with Me 2001 ==
"Dance with Me 2001"

Single by Alphaville
- Released: September 2001
- Genre: Synthpop
- Label: Atlantic / WEA
- Songwriters: Bernhard Lloyd; Marian Gold; Ricky Echolette
- Producer: Alphaville

Alphaville singles chronology
""Forever Young 2001" (2001)	"Dance with Me 2001" (2001)	"Elegy" (2003)

In 2001, to precede the release of their remix album Forever Pop, Alphaville released "Dance with Me 2001" as a promotional-only single. This CD contained 3 unique remixes of the song, all remixed by Paul van Dyk.

== Track listings ==
CD single

1. "Dance with Me 2001 (Paul van Dyk Short Cut)" — 4:19
2. "Dance with Me 2001 (Paul van Dyk Long Run)" — 7:28
3. "Dance with Me 2001 (Paul van Dyk Long Instrumental)" — 7:26
- The "short cut" version is in fact about 20 seconds longer than the version that appears on the album Forever Pop
- Some copies of the single mis-printed the single's name on the cover as "Dance wit Me"^{1}
- The "long run" remix later appeared on the Retro Remixed Rare & Extended compilation in 2004
