= Universal Daddy =

Single by Alphaville

from the album Afternoons in Utopia
- B-side: "Next Generation"
- Released: June 1986
- Recorded: March 1986
- Studio: Hansa Tonstudio, Berlin
- Genre: Synth-pop
- Length: 3:57 (7" version); 6:01 (Aquarian Dance Mix)
- Label: Atlantic / WEA
- Songwriters: Marian Gold; Bernhard Lloyd; Ricky Echolette
- Producer: Peter Walsh

Alphaville singles chronology
"Dance With Me" (1986)	"Universal Daddy" (1986)	"Jerusalem" (1986)

Universal Daddy is the sixth single by Alphaville, and the second from their album Afternoons in Utopia. It was released only in Europe.

== Reviews ==
This song was described as one of the album's best songs and reminiscent of the kind of music that their contemporaries the Pet Shop Boys might produce. Despite the praise, the song is one of singer Marian Gold's least favorite Alphaville songs ever, saying simply that "the lyrics are the most embarrassing ones I've ever written".

== Track listings ==
7" single

1. "Universal Daddy" — 3:57
2. "Next Generation" — 3:58

12" single

1. "Universal Daddy (Aquarian Dance Mix)" — 6:16
2. "Next Generation" — 3:58
- The writing credit for "Next Generation" is listed as "Gold/Lloyd/Echolette/Ryan"
- The B-side also appears on the US single release of "Red Rose", and a new remix of the song appears on 1999's Dreamscapes

US Promotional 12" single (PR-978)

1. "Universal Daddy (Vocal/Extended Remix)" — 6:15
2. "Universal Daddy (Vocal/LP Version)" 3:54
- The "Vocal/Extended Remix" is the same as the UK's "Aquarian Dance Mix"
- In 2014, the "Aquarian Dance Mix" and the unaltered b-side "Next Generation" were released for the first time on CD on so80s presents Alphaville.

== Charts ==
Chart	Peak position
Switzerland Singles Chart	26

== Other releases ==
One demo of this song was released on the album Dreamscapes, and another on the fan-only release History.
