= Afternoons in Utopia =

Studio album by Alphaville
- Released: 5 June 1986
- Recorded: September 1985 – May 1986
- Genre: Synth-pop
- Length: 46:36
- Label: Warner / Atlantic
- Producer: Peter Walsh, Wolfgang Loos, Steve Thompson, Michael Barbiero

Alphaville chronology
| Forever Young (1984) | Afternoons in Utopia (1986) | Alphaville Amiga Compilation (1988) |

Singles from Afternoons in Utopia
- 1. "Dance with Me" Released: March 1986; 2. "Universal Daddy" Released: June 1986; 3. "Jerusalem" Released: November 1986; 4. "Sensations" Released: December 1986; 5. "Red Rose" Released: April 1987

Afternoons in Utopia is the second album by German synth-pop band Alphaville, released in 1986 via Warner Music. The album was recorded between September 1985 and May 1986.

A remastered and re-released version of the album, on both CD and vinyl, was released on 7 May 2021.

== Background ==
Afternoons in Utopia is the follow-up to Alphaville's successful first album, Forever Young. Singer/songwriter Marian Gold said of these albums, "our first album emerged from the smut of the Here and Now and our second led back to our roots in Sugar Candy Mountain", and the band employed no less than 27 guest musicians and singers to record the songs. Alphaville released five singles from the album: "Dance with Me", "Universal Daddy", "Jerusalem", "Sensations" and "Red Rose", with all but "Sensations" charting internationally.

The album was remastered and re-released in May 2021 and includes the original album, plus "14 remastered B-sides, 12-inch and seven-inch remixes, demos and a rare live version of the single 'Dance With Me'. The release was overseen by original band members Gold and Bernhard Lloyd, and was remastered by Lloyd and Stefan Betke.

== Reviews ==
Professional ratings
Review scores
| Source | Rating |
|---|---|
| AllMusic | 3/5 stars |

Reviews for this album were again generally positive, with one reviewer saying "at points things are just bad yup-funk for wine bars, but a couple of misfires aside, Afternoons in Utopia holds up well" and "in retrospect it's actually a successful endeavour, perfectly evocative of a mainstream style." The album finished in the Top 20 in five European countries and at #174 in the US. Another reviewer points out that "by the time of this album's 1986 release, synth-pop was no longer a chart concern."

== Album notes ==
The album's lyrics make several references to cosmic entities ("sci-fi" as one reviewer called it), including comets, the planet Mars and its landscape, and a starship. When the word "smile" is used in the songs "Afternoons in Utopia," "Lassie Come Home," and "Red Rose," it's printed in the liner notes as the acronym S.M.I².L.E., a reference to Timothy Leary, which stands for "Space Migration, Increased Intelligence, [and] Life Extension."

Marian Gold, singer and songwriter for the band, acknowledged that the message of their music was different from their previous album with this comment which accompanied the song "Sensations" in the liner notes for the 1992 release First Harvest 1984-92: "Sometimes people used to say, 'Have they gone crazy now? Talking with dolphins and all that!!' But I think that once we've learned the language of the dolphins - this mutual approach - that could be the moment of significant change in our messed up civilization.

== Track listing ==
All tracks are written by Marian Gold, Bernhard Lloyd and Ricky Echolette, except as noted

| No. | Title | Writer(s) | Length |
|---|---|---|---|
| 1. | "IAO" | | 0:42 |
| 2. | "Fantastic Dream" | | 3:56 |
| 3. | "Jerusalem" | | 4:09 |
| 4. | "Dance With Me" | | 3:59 |
| 5. | "Afternoons in Utopia" | | 3:08 |
| 6. | "Sensations" | | 4:24 |
| 7. | "20th Century" | | 1:25 |
| 8. | "The Voyager" | | 4:37 |
| 9. | "Carol Masters" | | 4:32 |
| 10. | "Universal Daddy" | | 3:57 |
| 11. | "Lassie Come Home" | | 6:59 |
| 12. | "Red Rose" | | 4:05 |
| 13. | "Lady Bright" | Albert & The Heart of Gold | 0:43 |

=== 2021 Remaster ===
The first disc of the 2021 remaster is the same as the original 1986 release.

Disc Two
| No. | Title | Length |
|---|---|---|
| 1. | "Dance with Me (Empire Remix)" | 8:14 |
| 2. | "Universal Daddy (Aquarian Dance Mix)" | 6:16 |
| 3. | "Jerusalem (The Palace Version)" | 6:17 |
| 4. | "Sensations (Club Mix)" | 6:08 |
| 5. | "Red Rose (The Remix)" | 7:53 |
| 6. | "The Nelson Highrise (Sector 2: The Mirror)" (B-side to "Dance with Me") | 3:43 |
| 7. | "Next Generation" (B-side to "Universal Daddy" and the US release of "Red Rose") | 3:58 |
| 8. | "Vingt Mille Lieues Sous Les Mers (Incl. The Nelson Highrise (Sector 3: The Garage))" (B-side to "Jerusalem" and "Sensations") | 5:00 |
| 9. | "Big Yello Sun (Concrete Soundtraxx for Imaginary Films I)" (B-side to the European release of "Red Rose") | 6:47 |
| 10. | "Red Rose (7" Remix)" | 4:36 |
| 11. | "Sensations (7" Remix)" | 4:13 |
| 12. | "Carol Masters (Original Demo)" | 4:08 |
| 13. | "Lassie Come Home (Original Demo)" | 7:25 |
| 14. | "Dance with Me (Unplugged - Live in Salt Lake City 1999)" | 4:49 |

The first song on the album, "IAO" ("International Aquarian Opera"), begins with the word "night" and fades into the short IAO chorus, which itself is a lyric from the song "Afternoons in Utopia". The album ends with the song "Lady Bright", a limerick about relativity, wherein the Lady Bright leaves one day and returns "the previous ...[night]", with the word "night" omitted, thus the album loops back to its beginning.

The song "Afternoons in Utopia" is dedicated "For Inka" in the liner notes for the album.

== Chart positions ==
| Chart (1986) | Peak position |
|---|---|
| Finnish Albums (Suomen virallinen lista) | 21 |
| Germany Albums Chart | 13 |
| Italy Albums Chart | 41 |
| Norway Albums Chart | 8 |
| Sweden Albums Chart | 7 |
| Switzerland Albums Chart | 12 |
| US Billboard 200 | 174 |

| Chart (2021) | Peak position |
|---|---|
| Hungarian Albums (MAHASZ) | 14 |

== Album credits ==
Afternoons in Utopia was composed by Marian Gold, Bernhard Lloyd, and Ricky Echolette. All songs produced by Peter Walsh except where noted.

- "IAO"
  - Children's Choir - Stephanie Cooling, Peter Docherty, Louise McKenna, Jenny Troy, David Walround
- "Fantastic Dream" (produced by Steve Thompson and Michael Barbiero)
  - Alan Childs - Drums
  - David Lebold - Keyboards
  - Jimmy Maelen - Percussion
  - Jimmy Ripp - Guitars
  - Carmine Rojas - Bass guitar
- "Jerusalem" (produced by Wolfgang Loos)
  - Denice Brooks - Backing vocals
  - Turhan Geza - Percussion
  - Roger Linn - Drums
  - Wolfgang Loos - Keyboards
  - Gustl Luetjens - Guitars
  - William "Kooley" Scott - Backing vocals
  - Jocelyn B. Smith - Backing vocals
- "Dance with Me" (produced by Steve Thompson and Michael Barbiero)
  - Michael Barbiero - Backing vocals
  - Dave Lebold - Keyboards
  - Roger Linn - Drums
  - Jimmy Maelen - Percussion
  - Jimmy Ripp - Guitars
- "Afternoons in Utopia" (produced by Wolfgang Loos and Peter Walsh)
  - Children's Choir - Stephanie Cooling, Peter Docherty, Louise McKenna, Jenny Troy, David Walround
  - Wolfgang Loos - Keyboards
- "Sensations"
  - Guy Barker - Trumpets
  - Stuart Brooks - Trumpets
  - Andy Brown - Bass guitar
  - Judy Cheeks - Backing vocals
  - Roger Linn - Drums
  - Victoria Miles - Backing vocals
  - Phil Palmer - Guitars
  - Frank Ricotti - Percussion
  - Neil Sidwell - Trombone
  - Robin Smith - Brass arrangements
  - Phil Todd - Saxophones
- "20th Century"
  - Roger Linn - Drums
  - Robin Smith - Keyboards
- "The Voyager"
  - Guy Barker - Trumpets
  - Stuart Brooks - Trumpets
  - Andy Brown - Bass guitar
  - Judy Cheeks - Backing vocals
  - Bob Jenkins - Additional drums
  - Roger Linn - Drums
  - Robin Smith - Keyboards and Brass arrangements
  - Phil Todd - Saxophones
  - Peter Walsh - Keyboards
- "Carol Masters"
  - Andy Brown - Bass guitar
  - Bob Jenkins - Additional drums
  - Roger Linn - Drums
  - Phil Palmer - Guitars
  - Frank Ricotti - Percussion
  - Peter Walsh - Keyboards
- "Universal Daddy"
  - Guy Barker - Trumpets
  - Stuart Brooks - Trumpets
  - Andy Brown - Bass guitar
  - Judy Cheeks - Backing vocals
  - Bob Jenkins - Additional drums
  - Roger Linn - Drums
  - Victoria Miles - Background vocals
  - Phil Palmer - Guitars
  - Frank Ricotti - Percussions
  - Neil Sidwell - Trombone
  - Robin Smith - Keyboards and Brass arrangements
  - Phil Todd - Saxophones
- "Lassie Come Home"
  - Andy Brown - Bass guitar
  - Bob Jenkins - Additional drums
  - Janey Klimek - Guest vocal performance
  - Roger Linn - Drums
  - Phil Palmer - Guitars
  - Frank Ricotti - Percussion
  - Robin Smith - Keyboards and Brass arrangements
  - Phil Todd - Saxophones
- "Red Rose"
  - Guy Barker - Trumpets
  - Stuart Brooks - Trumpets
  - Andy Brown - Bass guitar
  - Judy Cheeks - Backing vocals
  - Roger Linn - Drums
  - Victoria Miles - Backing vocals
  - Phil Palmer - Guitars
  - Frank Ricotti - Percussion
  - Neil Sidwell - Trombone
  - Robin Smith - Keyboards and Brass arrangements
  - Phil Todd - Saxophones
