= Romeos (song) =

Single by Alphaville

from the album The Breathtaking Blue
- A-side: "Romeos"
- B-side: "Headlines"
- Released: March 1989
- Recorded: 1987–1988
- Studio: Lunapark Studios, Berlin
- Genre: Synth-pop
- Length: 5:29 (album version); 3:58 (7" version); 8:37 (maxi version)
- Label: WEA / Atlantic
- Songwriters: Marian Gold; Bernhard Lloyd; Ricky Echolette
- Producers: Klaus Schulze and Alphaville

Alphaville singles chronology
"Red Rose" (1987)	"Romeos" (1989)	"Summer Rain" (1989)

"Romeos" is the first single from Alphaville's 1989 album The Breathtaking Blue. It was released a month ahead of the album and was the first single by Alphaville to be released as a CD single, previous singles having preceded the format's rise in popularity.

== Reviews ==
Graeme Kay of Q Magazine praised singer & songwriter Marian Gold's "booming, Blancmange-ish balladry".

== Songlines segment ==
A short film was made for the song, it was included in the 1989 compilation Songlines, the "Romeos" segment was directed by Australian film director Ian Pringle and starred Australian actor Noah Taylor.

== Track listings ==
US cassette single

1. "Romeos (edit)" — 3:58
2. "Headlines" — 4:10

7" German promo single

1. "Romeos (radio version)" — 3:50
2. "Headlines" — 4:10
- The "radio version" was the edit version with the guitar introduction removed.

7" German single

1. "Romeos (edit)" — 3:58
2. "Headlines" — 4:10

12" German single

1. "Romeos" — 8:37
2. "Headlines" — 4:10
3. "Romeos (LP version)" — 5:29
- This unnamed 8:37 version is the "maxi version" found on the US promotional CD single

12" US single

1. "Romeos (tribal mix)" — 6:35
2. "Romeos (radio edit)" — 3:55
3. "Romeos (balcony mix)" — 6:03
4. "Headlines" — 4:14

12" US promo single

1. "Romeos (tribal mix)" — 6:35
2. "Romeos (radio edit)" — 3:55
3. "Romeos (balcony mix)" — 6:03
4. "Romeos (teknopella)" — 4:30
- The "Teknopella" mix was unique to this promotional single

3" CD single

1. "Romeos" — 8:37
2. "Headlines" — 4:10
3. "Romeos (LP version)" — 5:29
- A demo of the B-side "Headlines" appears on 1999's album Dreamscapes

5" US promo CD single

1. "Romeos (single version)" — 3:58
2. "Romeos (LP version)" — 5:29
3. "Romeos (maxi version)" — 8:37

== Charts ==
"Romeos" reached #45 on Germany's pop charts when it was released in 1989.

== Credits ==
Music and lyrics for the single and B-side are credited to Marian Gold/Bernhard Lloyd/Ricky Echolette.

== Other releases ==
This song was released on a variety of other official Alphaville releases, including:

- First Harvest 1984-92, 1992 (album version)
- Dreamscapes, 1999 (demo & remix)
- Forever Pop, 2001 (new remix)

The German 12" mix and the unaltered b-side appear on 2014's so80s presents Alphaville.
