= I Die for You Today =

Single by Alphaville

from the album Catching Rays on Giant
- A-side: "I Die for You Today"
- Released: 22 August 2010
- Recorded: 2010
- Genre: Synth-pop
- Length: Radio Version 3:47; Acoustic Version 3:34
- Label: We Love Music
- Songwriter(s): Marian Gold; Martin Lister; The Outsider
- Producer(s): Jochen Schmalbach, Thorsten Brötzmann (Track 1); David Goodes, Martin Lister (Track 2)

Alphaville singles chronology
"Forever Young-The Remix" (2006)	"I Die for You Today" (2010)	"Song for No One" (2011)

"I Die for You Today" is the 22nd single overall from Alphaville, and the first single from Alphaville's 2010 album Catching Rays on Giant. The original lyrics for the song were written by The Outsider, a long-time fan of the band, and published on the band's official mailing list in 2001. Marian Gold later reworked the lyrics for the song.

It was released on 22 August 2010.

== Track listing ==
CD Single

1. "I Die for You Today" – 3:47
2. "I Die for You Today (Acoustic Version) – 3:34

Digital Download

1. "I Die for You Today" – 3:47
2. "I Die for You Today (Acoustic Version) – 3:34

The Blank & Jones Mixes (2023)

1. "I Die for You Today (Blank & Jones so8os mix)" – 3:35
2. "I Die for You Today (Blank & Jones so8os Extended mix)" – 5:27
3. "I Die for You Today (Blank & Jones Club mix)" – 7:47
4. "I Die for You Today (Blank & Jones Dub mix)" – 7:47
5. "I Die for You Today (Blank & Jones Club mix Edit)" – 3:17

== Chart performance ==
The single hit No. 15 in Germany and No. 64 in Austria, and represents Alphaville's first chart-performing single since "Fools" in 1994.
