= Catching Rays on Giant =

Studio album by Alphaville
- Released: 19 November 2010
- Recorded: 2010
- Genre: Synth-pop
- Length: 51:15; 66:17 (deluxe edition)
- Label: We Love Music/Universal

Alphaville chronology
Dreamscapes Revisited (2005)	Catching Rays on Giant (2010)	So80s presents Alphaville (2014)

Singles from Catching Rays on Giant
- 1. "I Die for You Today" Released: 22 August 2010; 2. "Song for No One" Released: 1 March 2011 (digital), 4 March 2011 (CD single)

Professional ratings
Review scores
Source	Rating
AllMusic	4/5 stars

Catching Rays on Giant is the sixth studio album by German synth-pop band Alphaville, released in Europe on 19 November 2010.

== Track listing ==
No.	Title	Writer(s)	Length
1.	"Song for No One"	Marian Gold; David Goodes; Martin Lister	3:32
2.	"I Die for You Today"	Gold; Lister; The Outsider	3:47
3.	"End of the World"	Gold; Lister	3:59
4.	"The Things I Didn't Do"	Gold; Lister; Rainer Bloss; Ingmar Kappel	4:40
5.	"Heaven on Earth (The Things We've Got to Do)"	Gold; Lister	4:45
6.	"The Deep"	Gold; Lister	4:23
7.	"Call Me"	Gold; Lister	3:47
8.	"Gravitation Breakdown"	Gold; Bloss; Kappel	4:15
9.	"Carry Your Flag"	Gold; Bloss	4:53
10.	"Call Me Down"	Gold; Lister; Goodes; David McNamee	4:31
11.	"Phantoms"	Gold; Lister; Goodes	3:39
12.	"Miracle Healing"	Gold; Bloss	5:04

Bonus tracks exclusive on the deluxe edition
No.	Title	Length
13.	"I Die for You Today" (Original Demo Version)	3:34
14.	"Call Me" (Original Demo Version)	3:29
15.	"Fallen Angel" (Orchestral Demo Version)	3:35
16.	"Forever Young" (Factory Mix)	4:20

== Charts ==
Chart (2010)	Peak position
Austrian Albums Chart	64
German Albums Chart	9
Swiss Albums Chart	59
