= Romeos =

Romeos may refer to:

- "Romeos" (song), song by Alphaville
- Romeos (film), 2011 German film
