= Songlines (Alphaville video) =

Video by Alphaville
- Released: 22 September 1989
- Genre: Synthpop, new wave
- Length: 49 minutes
- Label: WEA

Alphaville chronology
Songlines (1989)	MoonOffice Compilation (1993)

Songlines is a video released by the German band Alphaville in 1989, created during the production of Alphaville's 1989 album The Breathtaking Blue.

== Background ==
Nine directors (or directing teams) from seven countries were each given a different track from The Breathtaking Blue and asked to make a short movie inspired by the song. The title 'Songlines' is a reference to the Australian aboriginal belief that "the gods created the world and everything in it by wandering through the desert and calling creation into life through their singing. Till this day, Aborigines follow these songlines, guided by totems which the gods left behind for them".

The video collection was re-released in May 2021, as part of the re-release of the album The Breathtaking Blue. Band member Bernhard Lloyd said of the project, "The crazy endeavor to turn the entire album into the film Songlines actually worked out in a wondrous way. A separate short film for each song, from directors all across the world – a project ahead of its time almost 35 years ago. The treasure of original 35mm film tapes have been recovered, the tapes meticulously restored and digitalized. Now, these films can finally be enjoyed in all of their beauty. It's a completely new experience."

== Awards ==
Christoph & Wolfgang Lauenstein's video for "Middle of the Riddle" was later retitled Balance and won in 1990 the Academy Award for Best Animated Short Film (albeit with different music).

== Track listing ==
1. "For a Million" - 9:21 (directed by Alexander Kaidanovsky, U.S.S.R.)
2. "Romeos" - 4:58 (directed by Ian Pringle, Australia)
3. "Middle of the Riddle" - 5:00 (directed by Christoph & Wolfgang Lauenstein, F.R.G.)
4. "Heaven or Hell" - 3:38 (directed by Slobodan Pesic, Yugoslavia)
5. "Ariana" - 3:49 (directed by Ricky Echolette & Olaf Bessenbacher, West Berlin)
6. "She Fades Away" - 5:02 (directed by Mao Kawaguchi, Japan)
7. "Summer Rain" - 4:14 (directed by Susanne Bier, Denmark)
8. "Mysteries of Love" - 5:02 (directed by Alex Proyas, Australia)
9. "Patricia's Park" - 4:19 (directed by Godfrey Reggio, U.S.A.)
10. "Anyway" - 2:56
