= So80s presents Alphaville =

Compilation album by Alphaville
- Released: 31 October 2014
- Genre: Synth-pop
- Length: 85:10 (CD 1); 85:57 (CD 2)
- Label: Soundcolours
- Producer: Various

Alphaville chronology
Catching Rays on Giant (2010)	So80s presents Alphaville (2014)	Strange Attractor (2017)

So80s presents Alphaville is a compilation album for the band Alphaville, released in October 2014. The release includes all of their original 12-inch 1980's maxi-singles and their respective B-sides, many for the first time on CD in their original form.

== Background ==
This 2-CD collection includes all original 1980's 12" singles starting with "Big in Japan" (1984) through "Mysteries of Love" (1989). Also included are the original B-sides and select alternate mixes, including original instrumental and dub mixes. One original mix (Torsten Fenslau's remix of "Big in Japan") is also included. The tracks were remastered from the original master tapes, and initial copies were signed by the band.

== Track listing ==
CD 1: The Original 12" Mixes
No.	Title	Notes	Length
1.	"Big In Japan (Extended Re-Mix)"		7:26
2.	"Sounds Like A Melody (Special Long Version)"		7:43
3.	"Forever Young (Special Dance Version)"		6:10
4.	"Jet Set (Jellybean Mix)"		6:32
5.	"Dance with Me (Empire Remix)"		8:15
6.	"Universal Daddy (Aquarian Dance Mix)"		6:19
7.	"Jerusalem (The Palace Version)"		6:18
8.	"Sensations (Club Mix)"	Titled "Metropolitan Remix" on the 1986 release	6:07
9.	"Red Rose (The 12" Remix)"		7:51
10.	"Romeos (Extended Mix)"	This is the extended mix from the German 12" single	8:37
11.	"Summer Rain (Extended Version)"		5:30
12.	"Mysteries Of Love (Remix)"	Titled "12" German Mix" on the 1989 release	7:59
Total length:			85:10

CD 2: The Original B-Sides
No.	Title	Notes	Length
1.	"Seeds"	B-side to "Big in Japan"	3:18
2.	"The Nelson Highrise (Sector One: The Elevator)"	B-side to "Sounds Like a Melody"	4:12
3.	"Welcome To The Sun"	B-side to "Forever Young"	3:10
4.	"Golden Feeling"	B-side to "Jet Set"	3:52
5.	"The Nelson Highrise (Sector Two: The Mirror)"	B-side to "Dance with Me"	3:42
6.	"Next Generation"	B-side to "Sensations" and the US "Red Rose" release	3:58
7.	"Vingt Mille Lieues Sous Les Mers (including The Nelson Highrise Sector Three: The Garage)"	B-side to "Jerusalem"	5:02
8.	"Concrete Soundtraxx for Imaginary Films I"	B-side to the European "Red Rose" release	6:46
9.	"Headlines"	B-side to "Romeos"	4:12
10.	"Sister Sun"	B-side to "Summer Rain"	3:56
11.	"Summer In Berlin (Demo Version)"	B-side to "Summer Rain"	5:53
12.	"Like Thunder"	B-side to "Mysteries of Love"	4:47
13.	"Big In Japan (Extended Instrumental Mix)"	B-side to "Big in Japan"	6:00
14.	"Jet Set (Dub Mix)"	B-side to "Jet Set"	5:12
15.	"Romeos (Tribal Mix)"	A-side to the US single release	6:32
16.	"Big In Japan (Remix '88)"	A-side to the 1988 single release	6:58
17.	"Big In Japan (Torsten Fenslau Remix)"	New remix	7:51
Total length:			85:57

== Critical reception ==
Professional ratings
Review scores
Source	Rating
CD-Rezension (German)	10/10 stars
Amusio (German)	Favorable

The album has been favorably reviewed, and entered the German charts at No. 26.
