= Song for No One =

Single by Alphaville

from the album Catching Rays on Giant
- A-side: "Song for No One"
- B-side: "Unplugged Medley"
- Released: 1 March 2011 (digital single); 4 March 2011 (CD single)
- Recorded: 2011
- Genre: Synth-pop, electropop
- Length: 3:31
- Label: We Love Music
- Songwriter(s): Marian Gold; Martin Leister; David Goodes
- Producer(s): Jochen Schmalbach , Thorsten Brötzmann

Alphaville singles chronology
"I Die for You Today" (2010)	"Song for No One" (2011)

"Song for No One" is the 23rd single overall from Alphaville, and the second single from the band's 2010 album Catching Rays on Giant.

It was released digitally on 1 March and physically on 4 March 2011.

== Track listing ==
CD Single

1. "Song for No One" – 3:31
2. "Unplugged Medley" – 16:08
  - Carry on Your Flag
  - Big in Japan
  - Dance with Me

Digital Download

1. "Song for No One " – 3:31
2. "Unplugged Medley" – 16:08
  - Carry on Your Flag
  - Big in Japan
  - Dance with Me

== Chart performance ==
The single hit No. 50 in Germany.
