= The Breathtaking Blue =

Studio album by Alphaville
- Released: 4 April 1989
- Recorded: 1987 – November 1988
- Studio: Lunapark Studios, Berlin
- Genre: Synth-pop
- Length: 42:59
- Label: Warner Music
- Producer: Klaus Schulze; Alphaville

Alphaville chronology
Alphaville: The Singles Collection (1988)	The Breathtaking Blue (1989)	First Harvest 1984–92 (1992)

Singles from The Breathtaking Blue
- 1. "Romeos" Released: March 1989; 2. "Summer Rain" Released: June 1989; 3. "Mysteries of Love" Released: January 1990

The Breathtaking Blue is the third album by German synth-pop band Alphaville, released in April 1989. A companion video, Songlines, was released in September 1989. The CD release of this album was one of the first commercial CD+G format discs. Alphaville released three singles from the album, "Romeos", "Summer Rain" and "Mysteries of Love", the first of which charted internationally.

A remastered and re-released version of the album, on both CD and vinyl, was released on 7 May 2021.

== Album production ==
Production of the album was difficult, singer Marian Gold would later say "the production saw Alphaville in the horrors of permanent crisis. There was an ongoing war between [the band]. ... The furious guitar shrieks during the intro [of lead-off single "Romeos"] being a true indication of the real spirit of the production," and that "'The Breathtaking Blue' was our 'I don't give a shit' album, a self-indulgent arrogant blind shot over the shoulder into the future with our backs to the audience."

The song "The Mysteries of Love" was written about the dream of the "end of the Iron Curtain" which fell between the song's recording and its release as a single, prompting the band to change the cover image from "a phone of a piece of wall graffiti" to "a man ... smoking his pipe in an aquarium."

The album was re-released on 7 May 2021, and included remastered b-sides, demos, and a DVD with the original CD+G graphics package as well as the video collection Songlines, which had not been available since its original release in 1989. The release was overseen by original band members Gold and Bernhard Lloyd, and was remastered by Lloyd and Stefan Betke.

== Album cover ==
The cover of the album is a composite of two works: the first being The Tower of Babel by Pieter Bruegel; the second being the blue sun. The face in the blue sun is credited to Michelangelo, from a sibyl on the ceiling of the Sistine Chapel. The halo of sunrays is of unknown origin. The year '1989' (the year the album was released) is displayed in Roman numerals across the bottom of the cover. The back cover has a drawing of Pharaoh Akhenaten and Queen Nefertiti.

== Reception ==
Professional ratings
Review scores
Source	Rating
AllMusic	2/5 stars

Evan Cater, writing for AllMusic, called the album "somewhat disappointing" compared to their previous releases, and notes that "the production, by Klaus Schulze and Alphaville ... is met with mixed success." In particular the reviewer found that the songs suffered due to the band's "experiments with a somewhat richer instrumentation, adding strings, saxophone, trumpet, double bass, electric and even acoustic guitars." Cater did like some of the individual tracks on the album, calling "Heaven or Hell" "one of the album's more interesting efforts", and "For a Million" "as genuine as the band gets." Graeme Kay, writing for Q Magazine, was more positive, calling the album "a highly polished cluster of glimmering technopop" and saying that "the overall effect is accessible and often breathtaking."

== Track listing ==
=== Original 1989 release ===
All tracks are written by Marian Gold, Bernhard Lloyd and Ricky Echolette except where noted.

No.	Title	Length
1.	"Summer Rain"	4:10
2.	"Romeos"	5:29
3.	"She Fades Away"	4:57
4.	"The Mysteries of Love"	4:45
5.	"Ariana"	3:42
6.	"Heaven or Hell"	3:27
7.	"For a Million" (Lyrics by Gold, Janey Diamond, Lloyd and Echolette)	6:09
8.	"Middle of the Riddle"	3:19
9.	"Patricia's Park"	4:12
10.	"Anyway"	2:48

Many of the album's tracks would find their way, in remixed, instrumental or demo form, to 1999's album Dreamscapes.

=== 2021 Remaster ===
All tracks are written by Marian Gold, Bernhard Lloyd and Ricky Echolette except where noted.

Disc One
No.	Title	Length
1.	"Summer Rain"	4:11
2.	"Romeos"	5:30
3.	"She Fades Away"	4:59
4.	"The Mysteries of Love"	4:56
5.	"Ariana"	3:44
6.	"Heaven or Hell"	3:29
7.	"For a Million" (Lyrics by Gold, Janey Diamond, Lloyd and Echolette)	6:10
8.	"Middle of the Riddle"	3:21
9.	"Patricia's Park"	4:14
10.	"Anyway"	2:50
11.	"Romeos (Single Version)"	4:06
12.	"Summer Rain (Single Version)"	4:01
13.	"Mysteries of Love (7" Remix Edit)"	3:34

Disc Two
No.	Title	Length
1.	"Romeos (Extended Mix)"	8:38
2.	"Summer Rain (Extended Version)"	5:32
3.	"Mysteries of Love (Remix)"	7:58
4.	"Headlines" (B-side to "Romeos")	4:11
5.	"Sister Sun" (B-side to "Summer Rain")	3:56
6.	"Like Thunder" (B-side to "Mysteries of Love")	4:47
7.	"Summer in Berlin (Demo Version Remix)" (B-side to "Summer Rain")	5:53
8.	"She Fades Away (Titanic Version) (Original Demo)" (B-side to "Summer Rain")	3:10
9.	"Ariana (Original Demo)"	2:37
10.	"Heaven or Hell (Original Demo)"	1:59
11.	"Headlines (Original Demo)"	3:48
12.	"The Mysteries of Love (Alternative Remix)" (from the US release; "LP Version with Sax")	4:55
13.	"Romeos (Teknopella)" (From the promotional US single release)	4:31
14.	"Romeos (Balcony Mix)" (From the US single release)	6:03
15.	"Romeos (Radio Edit)" (From the US single release)	4:01
16.	"Romeos (Tribal Mix)" (From the US single release)	6:27

Disc Three (DVD)
No.	Title	Length
1.	"Songlines"	49:44
2.	"The Breathtaking Blue CD+Graphics Videos"	43:12

== Personnel ==
- Guitars: Blacky Schwarz Ruszczynski, Micael Ryan, Eff Jott Krueger, Manuel Goettsching
- Backing vocals: Miriam Stockley, Mae McKenna, Patti Calore, The Lunapark Office Choir, Gabi Becker
- String arrangement: Rainer Bloss, Klaus Schulze
- Crescendo guitar: Kenneth Ward
- Saxophones: Thomas Keller, Friedemann Graef
- Drums, additional percussion: Hansi Behrendt
- Double bass: Ernst Deuker
- Vocoder voices: Julie Ocean
- Trumpet: Michael Junker
- String and brass arrangement: Rainer Bloss

Musicians Hansi Behrendt, Eff Jott Krueger and Ernst Deuker, who helped with some of the songs on this album, were themselves from the German band Ideal. Gabi Becker recorded with Alphaville again on 2003's CrazyShow.

== Charts ==
Chart (1989)	Peak position
Finnish Albums (Suomen virallinen lista)	34
German Albums (Offizielle Top 100)	49

Chart (2021)	Peak position
Hungarian Albums (MAHASZ)	16
German Albums (Offizielle Top 100)	23
