= Forever Young (Alphaville album) =

Studio album by Alphaville
- Released: 27 September 1984
- Recorded: January–August 1984
- Studio: Studio 54, Berlin
- Genre: Synth-pop
- Length: 43:12
- Labels: Warner; Atlantic; Rhino
- Producers: Colin Pearson; Wolfgang Loos; Andreas Budde

Alphaville chronology
Forever Young (1984)	Afternoons in Utopia (1986)

Singles from Forever Young
- 1. "Big in Japan" Released: January 1984; 2. "Sounds Like a Melody" Released: 14 May 1984; 3. "Forever Young" Released: 20 September 1984; 4. "Jet Set" Released: 1 March 1985

Forever Young is the debut studio album by German synth-pop band Alphaville. It was released on 27 September 1984 by Warner Music Group. Four singles supported the album: "Big in Japan", "Sounds Like a Melody", "Forever Young", and "Jet Set". The album charted well, hitting the top 20 in six European countries and reaching number 1 in Norway and Sweden. Alphaville followed up with their second album in 1986 with the release of Afternoons in Utopia.

The album was re-released in a "super deluxe" edition in March 2019.

== Background ==
In early 1983, the success of German songs such as Nena's "99 Luftballons", Falco's "Der Kommissar" and Peter Schilling's "Major Tom (Coming Home)" prompted the German WEA label to find other German bands, and a music scout brought Alphaville's demo of "Big in Japan" to the attention of head of WEA records Peter Koepke's attention, who immediately recognized the potential of the song and agreed to sign the band to the label.

== Songs ==
The band released the single "Big in Japan" before the album had finished recording, and its success surprised the band and label. The band said, "'[Big in Japan]' beamed us up into showbiz heaven, half of the album was still to be written. So, while we were in the middle of composing and arranging the residual songs, we were sort of overtaken by our future selves. … Once we wore tattered jeans and sweaty leather jacks … now we were homeless millionaires living in hotel suites and airports." Their sudden and unexpected success affected the rest of the album. In 1986, singer Marian Gold recalled that he "bought an album of an unknown British band named Big in Japan. As you know, there's a considerable musical market in Japan. If you wanted to become famous, what you should do was to form a hard rock group and then release an album over there; it would definitely sell well... so the story went ... The statement fitted well to my storyline about a couple of drug addicted lovers and moreover provided the title for the prospective song." He said later, "The song has nothing to do with Japan at all. It deals with the junkie scene in West Berlin."

The first three tracks the band recorded were "Big in Japan", "Seeds", which was released as the B-side to "Big in Japan", and "Forever Young", which was originally recorded as an up-tempo track. The band was not happy with the fast version of "Forever Young", and the recording of the track had come to a halt while the band figured out what to do with the song. It was producer Andreas Budde who suggested turning the track into a ballad, which is how the song was released.

The band had planned to release "Forever Young" as their second single, to follow the success of "Big in Japan". However, record studio executives requested that the band release an additional song between the two singles, and as a result, "Sounds Like a Melody" was written and arranged in just two days. Of the experience, Gold said "the whole affair felt like an insult to our naive hippie instincts. Writing music exclusively for the sake of commercial success seemed like the sell-out of our virtual beliefs. On the other hand, did this not open up possibilities for wonderful games to play in the brave new world of pop music?". This corporate pressure caused Gold to dislike the song and he refused to play it live for over 15 years.

Some songs they wrote for the album were sung in German ("Blauer Engel", "Traumtänzer", and "Leben Ohne Ende"), but none of the songs ended up making it on the actual release, instead being released as B-sides or on later retrospective albums. Colin Pearson, who co-produced the album, said that Marian Gold would occasionally have problems with lyrics, and then he would remember that Gold was writing in a foreign language. "Traumtänzer" stole its arrangement from Blancmange's song "Waves", but as the song was not released on the album at the time, its arrangement was never "fixed"; the song would eventually appear on the 2019 deluxe edition re-release of the album.

The song "Summer in Berlin" contains references to the East German uprising of 1953, which occurred on 17 June 1953. Gold said of the song's lyrics that "Berlin was an island, a colony for strange romancers. ... The spirit back then was somehow apocalyptic, eschatological. It was the Berlin of the iron curtain, the cold war, of low heroes and heroines at the Zoo ... In fact, nothing described in 'Summer in Berlin' is really pretty. But all of this along with the heat of the summer and my excited spirit evoked an awesome euphoria, it actually felt like someone was constantly singing inside, full of happiness and glee. Writing the song meant I just had to listen to that inner voice." When the compilation album Alphaville Amiga Compilation was assembled for release in East Germany in 1988, the song "Summer in Berlin" was submitted for inclusion, but rejected "for political reasons."

For the song "To Germany with Love", Gold would later remember that "In 1983 my relationship with Germany was tattered like Germany itself. Riven by the iron curtain, with two national anthems, spattered by the Nazi scum. A caricature of a home land. To this land I dedicated the song. I sang in English, language of the emigrants, of the exiled. I wrote to my detested, beloved home land, nostalgia in my heart, intoxicated with hate, love and grief."

"Fallen Angel" was written after "Big in Japan" was released, and the band said "everything changes when you're number one. The world becomes a big shopping mall where all is for free, people, objects, what-ever. There is something vulgar about all this."

In 1988, Gold said that "'In the Mood' is very likely about us, about how we felt in 1984, though we didn't realize that when we wrote it. The rocket-like success of "Big in Japan" was mind-blowing and irritating at the same time and we were scandalized by a horror of losing our artistic innocence ever since we had signed that record-deal."

On the song "The Jet Set", Gold said of the song, "We didn't intend to write a proper song; it was supposed to be some kind of jingle that advertises things money can't buy: anarchy, freedom, love, fun and a piece of the end of the world."

=== Equipment ===
Band member Bernhard Lloyd said the album was recorded using equipment such as the Roland TR-808 and Linn LM-1 drum machines, a Roland System-100M, an ARP String Ensemble and a Roland SDE 200 Digital Delay machine. The album was recorded on Tascam 8-track tapes, and they used a Friendchip SRC machine to synchronize all the tracks.

== Release ==
Forever Young was released on 27 September 1984 in Europe, including West Germany, on Warner Records (catalogue 2292404811 for the LP, 2292404814 for the cassette). The album was issued on vinyl LP and cassette. A compact disc edition did not follow until Atlantic's US pressing (catalogue 80186-2) in 1989, five years after the original release.

The album fared well across continental Europe, reaching the top 20 in six countries and topping the charts in Norway and Sweden, while making comparatively little impact in the United Kingdom and the United States, peaking at only number 180 on the Billboard 200. It reached number 3 in Germany and number 4 in Switzerland. The album was subsequently certified 3× Gold in Germany by the Bundesverband Musikindustrie, denoting shipments of over 750,000 copies.

In 2001, Alphaville released the remix album Forever Pop.

=== Re-release ===
On 15 March 2019, the album was remastered for the first time for its 35th anniversary. The package comes with two additional CDs, one with original single versions, B-sides and remixes and the other with 16 original demos. The other disc is a DVD that includes a 60-minute documentary and promo videos. There is also a super deluxe edition that includes the new remaster on vinyl and comes with a 24-page vinyl-sized booklet, created by the art director of the original album in close collaboration with the band and contains a variety of rare and unpublished photos, sleeve notes and various other testimonies.

== Critical reception ==
Professional ratings
Review scores
Source	Rating
AllMusic	4.5/5 stars

The review in AllMusic was positive, calling the album "a classic synth pop album" and saying that "Forever Young is a technically perfect and emotionally compelling slice of 1980s electronic pop/rock music. It's also a wonderfully fun ride from start to finish."

== Chart performance ==
The album fared well in parts of Europe, but it failed to make an impact on the UK charts or in the US, faring no better than number 180.

The single "Big in Japan" made a surprise entry onto the US Billboard Hot 100 at number 66, where it stayed on the chart for several weeks.

Although the title track "Forever Young" was re-released several times as a single by the band's label in the hope of it becoming a hit in the United States, it did not reach any higher than number 65 on the Hot 100. Although it reached one position higher than "Big in Japan", it quickly fell into obscurity and "Big in Japan" remains their biggest-selling single in the US. "Big in Japan" also managed to peak at number 8 on the UK Singles Chart, while "Forever Young" was also considered a commercial failure there, reaching number 98.

== Track listings ==
All tracks are written by Alphaville; lyrics by Marian Gold, music by Bernhard Lloyd and Frank Mertens.

Side one
No.	Title	Length
1.	"A Victory of Love"	4:14
2.	"Summer in Berlin"	4:42
3.	"Big in Japan"	4:40
4.	"To Germany with Love"	4:15
5.	"Fallen Angel"	3:55

Side two
No.	Title	Length
1.	"Forever Young"	3:45
2.	"In the Mood"	4:29
3.	"Sounds Like a Melody"	4:42
4.	"Lies"	3:32
5.	"The Jet Set"	4:52
Total length:		43:12

=== 2019 remaster ===
On 10 January 2019, it was officially announced that the album reissue of Forever Young would be released on 15 March 2019. The Forever Young reissues were published in several editions:

- Super Deluxe Edition (3-CD/1-DVD/1-vinyl) - the original 10-track album on the first disc, also original singles, B-sides and 12" version remixes on a second disc. Only on super deluxe it includes 16-track original demos including German-language songs on a third disc, the fourth disc is the DVD that includes a brand new documentary and promo music videos, the package also includes a remastered vinyl of the original 10-track album.
- Deluxe Edition (2-CD) - the original 10-track album on the first disc, including original singles, B-sides and 12" version remixes on a second disc.
- Separate remastered vinyl (one-LP) - the original 10-track album remastered by Bernhard Lloyd and Stefan Betke.

Disc 1 — the original 10-track album

Disc 2 — Original Singles, B-sides & 12" Versions
No.	Title	Length
1.	"Big in Japan" (single version)	3:54
2.	"Seeds" (B-side)	3:18
3.	"Sounds Like a Melody" (single version)	4:29
4.	"The Nelson Highrise (Sector 1: The Elevator)" (B-side)	3:14
5.	"Forever Young" (version rapide)	3:47
6.	"Welcome to the Sun" (B-side)	3:10
7.	"The Jet Set" (single remix)	3:51
8.	"Golden Feeling" (B-side)	3:52
9.	"Big in Japan" (extended remix)	7:26
10.	"Sounds Like a Melody" (special long version)	7:42
11.	"The Nelson Highrise (Sector 1: The Elevator)" (12" version)	4:12
12.	"Forever Young" (special dance version)	6:10
13.	"The Jet Set" (Jellybean mix)	6:32
14.	"Big in Japan" (extended instrumental)	6:00
15.	"The Jet Set" (dub mix)	5:12

Disc 3 — Demo Versions
No.	Title	Length
1.	"A Victory of Love" (demo remix)	4:15
2.	"Summer in Berlin" (original demo)	6:55
3.	"Big in Japan" (demo remix)	6:24
4.	"To Germany with Love" (original demo)	4:29
5.	"Fallen Angel" (demo remix)	4:07
6.	"Forever Young" (demo remix)	4:44
7.	"In the Mood" (demo remix)	5:04
8.	"Sounds Like a Melody" (original demo)	4:25
9.	"Lies" (original demo)	3:49
10.	"The Jet Set" (original demo)	4:22
11.	"Leben Ohne Ende / Seeds" (original demo)	3:15
12.	"Traumtänzer" (original demo)	5:17
13.	"Blauer Engel" (original demo)	4:39
14.	"Romance" (demo sketch)	1:16
15.	"Colours" (instrumental)	3:25
16.	"Into the Dark" (demo remix)	4:33

Disc 4 — DVD
No.	Title	Length
1.	"Never Grow Up – The Story of Forever Young" (featuring interviews with Marian Gold, Bernhard Lloyd, Colin Pearson, Wolfgang Loos and Ulf Meyer zu Küingdorf)	59:42
2.	"Big in Japan" (directed by Dieter Meier)	3:49
3.	"Sounds Like a Melody" (directed by Rolf Spinrads)	3:32
4.	"Forever Young" (directed by Brian Ward)	3:41
5.	"The Jet Set" (directed by Karl-Heinz Danguillier)	3:52

== Personnel ==
Alphaville

- Marian Gold – lead and backing vocals
- Bernhard Lloyd – sampler, synthesizer, drum machine, electric guitar
- Frank Mertens – keyboards

Additional musicians

- Wolfgang Loos – additional keyboards, gong
- Ken Taylor – bass
- Curt Cress – percussion, drums
- Wednesday, Gulfstream, the Rosie Singers, the Claudias – backing vocals
- Ralf Vornberger – solo vocal on B2
- Deutsche Oper Berlin Orchestra string section (track B3)

Production

- Produced by Wolfgang Loos, Colin Pearson, plus Andreas Budde on tracks A3, B3, B4
- Recorded and engineered by Wolfgang Loos and Uli Rudolph
- Technical assistance by Boris Balin and Thomas Beck
- Mixed by Wolfgang Loos
- Artwork, cover design by Ulf Meyer zu Küingdorf
- Inner sleeve photography by Thomas Reutter
- Management by Heinz-Gerd Luetticke

== Charts ==
=== Weekly charts ===
Chart (1984)	Peak position
Australian Albums (Kent Music Report)	91
Austrian Albums Chart	16
Finnish Albums (Suomen virallinen lista)	5
German Albums Chart	3
Hungarian Albums Chart	9
Italian Albums Chart	1
Norwegian Albums (VG-lista)	1
Swedish Albums Chart	1
Swiss Albums Chart	4
US Billboard 200	180

Chart (2011)	Peak position
Polish Albums (ZPAV)	49

== Certifications and sales ==
Region	Certification	Certified units/sales
France (SNEP)	Gold	
Germany (BVMI)	3× Gold	750,000^{^}
Italy (FIMI)	Gold	25,000^{‡}
Norway (IFPI Norway)	Gold	25,000^{*}
South Africa (RISA)	Gold	25,000^{*}
Sweden (GLF)	Platinum	100,000^{^}
Switzerland (IFPI Switzerland)	Gold	25,000^{^}
^{*} Sales figures based on certification alone.^{^} Shipments figures based on certification alone.^{‡} Sales+streaming figures based on certification alone.
