= First Harvest 1984–92 =

Greatest hits album by Alphaville
- Released: 23 March 1992
- Recorded: 1984–1992
- Genre: Synth-pop
- Length: 68:11
- Label: Warner
- Producer: Various

Alphaville chronology
The Breathtaking Blue (1989)	First Harvest 1984–92 (1992)	History (1993)

Professional ratings
Review scores
Source	Rating
AllMusic	link

First Harvest 1984–92 is a greatest-hits compilation by Alphaville.

The cassette version of First Harvest omits "Sensations", "Red Rose" and "Big in Japan" (Culture mix).

== Track listing ==
1. "Big in Japan" (Original 7" Version) – 3:54
2. "Sounds Like a Melody" (1992 Remix) – 4:29
3. "Sensations" (Original 7" Version) – 3:58
4. "The Mysteries of Love" (Original 7" Mix) – 3:34
5. "Lassie Come Home" (1992 Remix) – 6:58
6. "Jerusalem" (Original 7" Version) – 3:35
7. "Dance with Me" (1992 Remix) – 4:08
8. "For a Million" (Original Album Version) – 6:09
9. "A Victory of Love" (1992 Remix) – 4:13
10. "Jet Set" (1992 Remix) – 3:40
11. "Red Rose" (Original 7" Version) – 4:38
12. "Romeos" (Album Edit) – 4:52
13. "Summer Rain" (Original Album Version) – 4:10
14. "Forever Young" (Original Album Version) – 3:45
15. "Big in Japan" (1992 Culture Mix) – 6:08
- The "Culture Mix" of "Big in Japan" is identical to "The Mix Extended Version" from the "Big in Japan 1992 A.D." single release.

== Charts ==
Chart performance for First Harvest 1984–92
Chart (1992)	Peak position
Finnish Albums (Suomen virallinen lista)	2

== Certifications and sales ==
Certifications for First Harvest 1984–92
Region	Certification	Certified units/sales
Brazil (Pro-Música Brasil)	Gold	100,000^{*}
Finland (Musiikkituottajat)	Gold	38,152
Sweden (GLF)	Gold	50,000^{^}
^{*} Sales figures based on certification alone.^{^} Shipments figures based on certification alone.
