= Strange Attractor (album) =

Studio album by Alphaville
- Released: 7 April 2017
- Studio: Hansa, Berlin; Sterling Sound, New York City
- Genre: Synth-pop
- Length: 63:05
- Label: Polydor,
- Producer: Alphaville, Andreas Schwarz-Ruszczynski

Alphaville chronology
| So80s presents Alphaville (2014) | Strange Attractor (2017) | Live at the Whisky a Go Go (2019) |

Professional ratings
Review scores
| Source | Rating |
|---|---|
| Cryptic Rock | 4/5 stars |
| laut.de | 3/5 stars |

Strange Attractor is the seventh studio album by German band Alphaville, released in 2017. It placed on No. 39 in the German albums chart in April 2017.

== Track listing ==
All lyrics are written by Marian Gold.

| No. | Title | Music | Length |
|---|---|---|---|
| 1. | "Giants" | Marian Gold; Andreas Schwarz-Rusczczynski; Lorenzo Ternelli | 3:29 |
| 2. | "Marionettes with Halos" | Gold; Schwarz-Rusczczynski | 4:23 |
| 3. | "House of Ghosts" | Gold; Martin Lister | 5:08 |
| 4. | "Around the Universe" | Gold; Lister | 4:01 |
| 5. | "Enigma" | Gold; Schwarz-Rusczczynski; Ternelli; Rainer Bloss | 5:59 |
| 6. | "Mafia Island" | Gold; Schwarz-Rusczczynski; Ternelli | 6:24 |
| 7. | "A Handful of Darkness" | Gold; Lister | 7:57 |
| 8. | "Sexyland" | Gold; Schwarz-Rusczczynski; Lister | 3:52 |
| 9. | "Rendezvoyeur" | Gold; Schwarz-Rusczczynski; Markus Reinhard | 4:17 |
| 10. | "Nevermore" | Gold; Schwarz-Rusczczynski | 4:49 |
| 11. | "Fever!" | Gold; David Goodes; Ternelli | 3:47 |
| 12. | "Heartbreak City" | Gold; Schwarz-Rusczczynski; Lister | 3:48 |
| 13. | "Beyond the Laughing Sky" | Gold; Schwarz-Rusczczynski; Lister; Anna Gold | 5:39 |

== Personnel ==
- Marian Gold - vocals
- David Goodes - guitars
- Jakob Kiersch - drums
- Carsten Brocker - keyboards
- Alexandra Merl - bass
