= Forever Young (Alphaville song) =

1984 single by Alphaville

Single by Alphaville

from the album Forever Young
- B-side: "Welcome to the Sun"
- Released: 20 September 1984
- Studio: Studio 54
- Genre: Synth-pop; new wave
- Length: 3:44 (single/album version); 6:06 (special dance mix)
- Label: WEA
- Composers: Marian Gold; Bernhard Lloyd; Frank Mertens
- Lyricist: Marian Gold
- Producers: Colin Pearson; Wolfgang Loos; Andreas Budde

Alphaville singles chronology
"Sounds Like a Melody" (1984)	"Forever Young" (1984)	"Jet Set" (1985)

Music video
- "Forever Young" on YouTube

"Forever Young" is a song by German synth-pop band Alphaville, released in September 1984, by WEA, as the third single from their debut album of the same name (1984). The single was successful in Scandinavia and in the European German-speaking countries in the same year. It peaked at number 93 on the Billboard Hot 100 the following year in the United States, and number 63 in 1988. The accompanying music video was directed by Brian Ward and filmed in the United Kingdom. As of May 2026, "Forever Young" has over 1.2 billion streams on Spotify.

The single has been covered by numerous artists. It also formed the basis of Jay-Z's song "Young Forever". "Forever Young" is written in the key of C major.

In a 2022 interview, Alphaville lead singer Marian Gold said that it is "a great privilege" to have "Forever Young", as well as "Big in Japan", in "their luggage" when touring, and that he is grateful to be able to perform these songs.

== Alphaville versions ==
=== Original 1984 version ===
==== Background and video ====
Originally intended to be an upbeat dance song, producer Andreas Budde recommended paring the song down to a sparse synth-pop ballad. The band spent two days attempting to record the dance version, but were unsatisfied with the results. Budde then told them to strip away most of the tracks, leaving only the vocals and synth pads, and upon playing it back said, "This is the song."

Marian Gold originally wrote the third verse to evoke a "fascistic feeling" of the adoration of the crowd:

Can you imagine how we won the war?
Little fascist lady she loves you so
Following her leader, she's getting in tune
The music's played by the madmen

However, for the final recording, record executives pushed for a change, resulting in:

Can you imagine when this race is won
Turn our golden faces into the sun
Praising our leaders we're getting in tune
The music's played by the madmen

Gold calls the replacement "turn our golden faces into the sun" the worst lyric in the song.

Not a native English speaker, Gold received pronunciation instruction from producer Colin Pearson. The band had decided that the word "dance" in the first line should be pronounced /dɑːns/ in order for the song to sound British (specifically Southern English). Subsequently, the track uses the English pronunciation but sometimes Gold would forget this and sing the American pronunciation /dæns/ instead.

Originally released by Alphaville as a single in 1984, "Forever Young" was available in both its original mix and in a dance version, entitled the "Special Dance Mix". Over the years, the band has released several remixes and demo versions of the song.

In the US, the song debuted on the Billboard Hot 100 at number 95 in the week of 23 March 1985, peaking at number 93 the following week, before dropping off the chart following a four-week run; it also peaked at number 32 on the Hot Dance/Disco Club Play chart on 30 March. When re-released in 1988, the song was more successful in the US, peaking at number 65 on the Billboard Hot 100 in a total run of 14 weeks.

=== Music video ===
The song's music video, directed by Brian Ward, shows the band performing in one of the halls at Holloway Sanatorium in Virginia Water, England. A number of people from children to the elderly, dressed in ragged finery, awake to watch the band, then walk through a diamond-shaped glowing portal.

==== Reception ====
In 1987, the song topped yearly retrospective lists in San Francisco's KITS "Live 105" and New Jersey's WPST 94.5 radio stations, with Billboard calling it "the modern rock equivalent of 'Stairway to Heaven'". "Forever Young" was top on both lists, beating songs like U2's "Pride (In the Name of Love)", New Order's "Blue Monday" and the Smiths' "How Soon Is Now?".

In 2024, "Forever Young" gained wide popularity on the social media app TikTok, 40 years after the song's release. The song reached No. 1 on the Billboard charts in the United States, and stayed there for 10 weeks.

==== Track listings ====
- 7-inch single
1. "Forever Young" – 3:45
2. "Welcome to the Sun" – 3:09
- 12-inch maxi single
1. "Forever Young" (special dance version) – 6:06
2. "Forever Young" – 3:45
3. "Welcome to the Sun" – 3:09

Note: "Welcome to the Sun" also appeared (in a remix and a re-recording) on 1999's Dreamscapes.

==== Other releases ====
The original album version has also appeared on the following official Alphaville releases:

- Alphaville Amiga Compilation, 1988
- Alphaville: The Singles Collection, 1988
- First Harvest 1984–92, 1992

The "Special Dance Version" and the B-side "Welcome to the Sun" were both included on so80s presents Alphaville (2014).

=== Forever Young 2001 ===
In 2001, Alphaville released a new set of remixes in a "limited fan edition" called "Forever Young 2001". This single contained three music tracks, one spoken word track, and a PC-only track.

This CD was released to fans for free, only postage needed to be paid. The names of every fan who had requested a copy were printed on the inside cover. Copies were hand-signed by the band. The remixes that appear on the single have not appeared on other releases.

The cover is a still image from the video, which was created by the Cartoon Saloon.

==== Track listings ====
CD single

1. "Forever Young" (F.A.F's Diamonds in the Sun mix) – 3:56
  - Remixed by: F.A.F
2. "Forever Young" (Factory mix) – 4:21
  - Remixed by: José Alvarez-Brill
3. "Forever Young" (original demo 1983) – 4:43
4. "Thank You" (spoken version) – 3:44
5. "Forever Young" (Magix PlayR) (PC only)
- The track "Thank You" consisted of then-member Bernard Lloyd thanking the fans, while speaking over one of his "favorite tracks", which was a remix of "Lassie Come Home", as it was to appear on the 2001 remix album Forever Pop.
- The Magix PlayR track was a PC-only application that allowed fans to customize the FAF remix to their liking.

CD promo single

1. "Forever Young" (F.A.F's Diamonds in the Sun mix) — 3:56
- This promotional CD was produced in a strictly limited run of 500 copies and not sold commercially.

=== Forever Young the Remix ===
Released in 2006, this CD contains two new remixes by notable remix artist Bill Hamel. It also includes a digitally remastered version of the original album version of the song. The remix reached number 31 on the Australian ARIA singles chart, peaking higher than the original version in 1986, which only charted at number 47.

==== Track listing ====
- CD single
1. "Forever Young" (Hamel album mix) – 4:58
2. "Forever Young" (Bill Hamel club mix) – 7:39
3. "Forever Young" (remastered original version) – 3:47

== Charts ==
1984–1985 weekly chart performance for "Forever Young"
Chart (1984–1985)	Peak position
Australia (Kent Music Report)	47
Belgium (Ultratop 50 Flanders)	22
Canada Top Singles (RPM)	62
Europe (European Top 100 Singles)	18
Finland (Suomen virallinen lista)	24
France (SNEP)	13
Netherlands (Dutch Top 40)	18
Netherlands (Single Top 100)	19
Norway (VG-lista)	3
South Africa (Springbok Radio)	7
Spain (AFYVE)	14
Sweden (Sverigetopplistan)	1
Switzerland (Schweizer Hitparade)	3
UK Singles (Official Charts)	98
US Billboard Hot 100	65 (Note: The song peaked on the Hot 100 at number 93 in 1985 and number 65 in 1988.)
US Dance/Disco Club Play (Billboard)	32
West Germany (GfK)	4

2024–2026 weekly chart performance for "Forever Young"
Chart (2024–2026)	Peak position
Austria (Ö3 Austria Top 40)	42
Global 200 (Billboard)	105
Greece International (IFPI)	96
Lithuania (AGATA)	99
Norway Airplay (IFPI Norge)	70

== Certifications ==
Certifications for "Forever Young"
Region	Certification	Certified units/sales
Canada (Music Canada)	2× Platinum	160,000^{‡}
Denmark (IFPI Danmark)	Platinum	90,000^{‡}
Germany (BVMI)	Platinum	600,000^{‡}
Italy (FIMI)	Platinum	100,000^{‡}
New Zealand (RMNZ)	Platinum	30,000^{‡}
Portugal (AFP)	Platinum	10,000^{‡}
Spain (Promusicae)	2× Platinum	120,000^{‡}
United Kingdom (BPI)	Platinum	600,000^{‡}
United States (RIAA)	2× Platinum	2,000,000^{‡}
^{‡} Sales+streaming figures based on certification alone.

== Laura Branigan version ==
In 1985, American singer Laura Branigan covered "Forever Young" for her fourth album, Hold Me (1985).

She then went on to sing it as either the encore or the final track of her live performances for years.

== Interactive version ==
"Forever Young"

Single by Interactive
- Released: 1994
- Length: 3:40 (original version); 3:28 (Kosmonova version)
- Label: Blow Up; Intercord
- Songwriters: Bernhard Lloyd; Marian Gold; Frank Mertens
- Producers: Andreas Geraldo Schneider; Jens Lissat; Ramon Zenker

Interactive singles chronology
"Can You Hear Me Calling" (1994)	"Forever Young" (1994)	"Living Without Your Love" (1995)

Music video
- "Forever Young" on YouTube

In 1994, German electronic group Interactive released a cover of "Forever Young" which reached number seven in Germany and number ten in both Denmark and the Netherlands. It also made the top 20 in five other countries and on the Eurochart Hot 100, the song reached number 34. This electronic dance version does not contain most of the song's lyrics and only includes a slightly modified chorus as the sole vocals. In 2002, German DJ and music producer Kosmonova remixed this version of "Forever Young". The remix peaked at number 21 in Germany and number 37 in the UK.

=== Music video ===
The music video for "Forever Young" was directed by Basil Schlegel and features kids attending and partying in a night club. It was A-listed on German music television channel VIVA in February 1995.

=== Track listing ===
- CD maxi (Germany)
1. "Forever Young" (radio edit) – 3:40
2. "Forever Young" (extended version) – 5:59
3. "Mobilé" – 5:04
4. "Waves of Balah" – 5:44

=== Charts ===
Weekly chart performance for "Forever Young"
Chart (1994–1996)	Peak position
Australia (ARIA)	15
Austria (Ö3 Austria Top 40)	12
Belgium (Ultratop 50 Flanders)	38
Denmark (Tracklisten)	10
Europe (Eurochart Hot 100)	34
Finland (Suomen virallinen lista)	15
Germany (GfK)	7
Netherlands (Dutch Top 40)	10
Netherlands (Single Top 100)	15
Scottish Singles Sales (Official Charts)	5
Sweden (Sverigetopplistan)	18
Switzerland (Schweizer Hitparade)	15
UK Singles (Official Charts)	28
UK Dance (Official Charts)	14
UK Club Chart (Music Week)	49

Year-end chart performance for "Forever Young"
Chart (1995)	Position
Australia (ARIA)	71
Germany (Media Control)	61
Netherlands (Dutch Top 40)	96

=== Certifications ===
Certifications for "Forever Young"
Region	Certification	Certified units/sales
Australia (ARIA)	Gold	35,000^{^}
Germany (BVMI)	Gold	250,000^{^}
^{^} Shipments figures based on certification alone.

== Youth Group version ==
"Forever Young"

Single by Youth Group

from the album Casino Twilight Dogs
- B-side: "Someone Else's Dream"
- Released: 6 March 2006
- Length: 4:33
- Label: Ivy League
- Songwriters: Bernhard Lloyd; Marian Gold; Frank Mertens
- Producers: Wayne Connolly; Youth Group

Youth Group singles chronology
"Baby Body" (2004)	"Forever Young" (2006)	"Catching and Killing" (2006)

Music video
- "Forever Young" on YouTube

In 2005, Australian rock band Youth Group were asked by the producers of the American television series The O.C. to record a version of "Forever Young" for use in the show, following a positive response to the use of their single "Shadowland" in a previous episode. Their version of "Forever Young" was used in the show and the show's trailers and was included on the soundtrack album Music from the OC: Mix 5.

Released as a single on 6 March 2006, the song reached number one on the Australian ARIA Singles Chart for two nonconsecutive weeks and also entered the top 10 in New Zealand, reaching number seven on the RIANZ Singles Chart. In the United States, the song appeared on the Billboard Bubbling Under Hot 100 Singles chart, peaking at number 10. The track was included on Youth Group's third studio album, Casino Twilight Dogs, released later that year.

=== Track listing ===
Australian CD single

1. "Forever Young" – 4:33
2. "Someone Else's Dream" – 2:36
3. "Forever Young" (edit) – 3:26

=== Charts ===
Weekly chart performance for "Forever Young"
Chart (2006–2009)	Peak position
Australia (ARIA)	1
New Zealand (Recorded Music NZ)	7
Spain (Promusicae)	44
US Bubbling Under Hot 100 Singles (Billboard)	10
US Pop 100 (Billboard)	76

Year-end chart performance for "Forever Young"
Chart (2006)	Position
Australia (ARIA)	7

=== Certifications ===
Certifications for "Forever Young"
Region	Certification	Certified units/sales
Australia (ARIA)	5× Platinum	350,000^{‡}
New Zealand (RMNZ)	Platinum	30,000^{‡}
^{‡} Sales+streaming figures based on certification alone.

== Cash Cash version ==
"Forever Young"

Single by Cash Cash
- Released: 8 March 2010
- Length: 3:39
- Label: Universal
- Songwriters: Bernhard Lloyd; Frank Mertens; Marian Gold
- Producer: Cash Cash

Cash Cash singles chronology
"Everytime We Touch" (2010)	"Forever Young" (2010)	"Red Cup (I Fly Solo)" (2021)

In 2010, American electronic music group Cash Cash released a cover of the song. It was released on 8 March 2010 through Universal. The song was serviced to radio in the United States on 12 May 2010.

=== Background ===
Jean Paul Makhlouf stated that group chose to cover the song because "the idea of being forever young is just awesome," which was the reason why the group first formed. They were also inspired to cover the song due to the "many amazing memories" the band has made, such as recording a their debut studio album, hearing their song on the radio, touring the US and meeting fans across the world. Makhlouf also added:

I'll always be a teenager at heart. Of course there's a time for work, but you can't forget about the play. I always make sure I keep a good balance of the two.

=== Personnel ===
Credits adapted from AllMusic.

- Cash Cash – primary artist
- Bernhard Lloyd – composer
- Frank Mertens – composer
- Marian Gold – composer, lyricist

=== Music video ===
A music video for the song was released via YouTube on 29 June 2010. As of 2014, the video has since been removed.

=== Charts ===
Weekly chart performance for "Forever Young"
Chart (2010)	Peak position
US Dance/Electronic Digital Song Sales (Billboard)	34

== Becky Hill version ==
"Forever Young"

Single by Becky Hill
- Released: 13 November 2020
- Studio: Sarm West (London)
- Length: 2:58
- Label: Eko; Polydor
- Songwriters: Bernhard Lloyd; Frank Mertens; Marian Gold
- Producer: Charlie Hugall

Becky Hill singles chronology
"Space" (2020)	"Forever Young" (2020)	"Wake Up with You" (2021)

In 2020, British singer Becky Hill released a cover version of the song. It was released on 13 November 2020 by Polydor Records and Eko Records. The song was selected as the soundtrack to the 2020 McDonald's Christmas advert in the UK.

=== Background ===
The song raised money for FareShare, in which McDonald's donated five million meals for charity. Hill also donated 10p from every download, going to food charity FareShare. She said on her Twitter account, "'forever young' is bigger than just a nice christmas advert & song. @mcdonaldsuk has committed to funding @fareshareuk to redistribute over 5 million meals by April 2021 to families in need. at least 10p of every download goes towards a great cause. no child should be hungry".

=== Personnel ===
Credits adapted from Tidal.

- Charlie Hugall – producer, mixer, recording engineer, studio personnel
- Bernhard Lloyd – composer
- Frank Mertens – composer
- Marian Gold – composer, lyricist
- Adam Rust – associated performer, keyboards
- Becky Hill – associated performer, vocals
- Matt Colton – mastering engineer, studio personnel

=== Charts ===
Weekly chart performance for "Forever Young"
Chart (2021)	Peak position
UK Singles (Official Charts)	35

=== Certifications ===
Certifications for "Forever Young"
Region	Certification	Certified units/sales
United Kingdom (BPI)	Silver	200,000^{‡}
^{‡} Sales+streaming figures based on certification alone.

== David Guetta and Ava Max version ==
"Forever Young"

Single by David Guetta, Alphaville and Ava Max
- Released: 18 October 2024
- Genre: Dance
- Length: 2:36
- Label: Warner
- Songwriters: Amanda "Kiddo A.I." Ibanez; Bernhard Lloyd; David Guetta; Frank Mertens; Jakke Erixson; Marian Gold; Michael Pollack; Timofey Reznikov
- Producers: David Guetta; Jakke Erixson; Timofey Reznikov

David Guetta singles chronology
"Never Going Home Tonight" (2024)	"Forever Young" (2024)	"Supernova Love" (2024)

Alphaville singles chronology
"Big in Japan (Symphonic Version)" (2022)	"Forever Young" (2024)

Ava Max singles chronology
"Spot a Fake" (2024)	"Forever Young" (2024)	"1 Wish" (2024)

Music video
- "Forever Young" on YouTube

In October 2024, a version with French DJ and producer David Guetta and American singer Ava Max was released, featuring new verses.

=== Background ===
The original version of "Forever Young" went viral on the video-sharing platform TikTok in September 2024, sending the song to the top of the TikTok Billboard Top 50 chart on 5 October 2024. On 7 October 2024, Max performed the extended version of Guetta's version of the song in Ibiza, Spain alongside Guetta. On October 14, she released the official announcement for its release. The track inspired over 3 million TikTok creations.

Guetta's EDM version of "Forever Young" adds Ava Max's vocals for the new verses. Throughout mid-2024, it became a staple at Guetta's F* Me I'm Famous! residency at Ushuaïa Ibiza, with Max joining Guetta onstage for a sold-out and end-of-season performance in September.

=== Credits and personnel ===
- David Guetta – producer, programming
- Alphaville – vocals
- Marian Gold – vocals, songwriter
- Bernhard Lloyd – songwriter
- Frank Mertens – songwriter
- Shawn Carter – songwriter
- Ava Max – vocals
- Jakke Erixon – producer, programming
- Timofey Reznikov – producer, mixing engineering, mastering engineering, programming

== Charts ==
=== Weekly charts ===
Weekly chart performance for "Forever Young"
Chart (2024–2026)	Peak position
Australia (ARIA)	81
Austria (Ö3 Austria Top 40)	36
Belarus Airplay (TopHit)	55
Belgium (Ultratop 50 Wallonia)	12
Bulgaria Airplay (PROPHON)	5
Canada Hot 100 (Billboard)	64
Canada AC (Billboard)	9
Canada CHR/Top 40 (Billboard)	11
Canada Hot AC (Billboard)	11
Central America Anglo Airplay (Monitor Latino)	3
Colombia Anglo Airplay (National-Report)	5
CIS Airplay (TopHit)	11
Croatia International Airplay (Top lista)	8
Czech Republic Airplay (ČNS IFPI)	1
Dominican Republic Anglo Airplay (Monitor Latino)	9
Ecuador Anglo Airplay (Monitor Latino)	3
El Salvador Anglo Airplay (Monitor Latino)	1
Estonia Airplay (TopHit)	1
Finland Airplay (Radiosoittolista)	6
France (SNEP)	37
Germany (GfK)	10
Hungary (Dance Top 40)	3
Hungary (Rádiós Top 40)	1
Iceland (Tónlistinn)	34
Israel International Airplay (Media Forest)	7
Japan Hot Overseas (Billboard Japan)	15
Latin America Anglo Airplay (Monitor Latino)	2
Latvia Airplay (TopHit)	15
Lebanon (Lebanese Top 20)	6
Lithuania Airplay (TopHit)	2
Moldova Airplay (TopHit)	9
Netherlands (Dutch Top 40)	7
Netherlands (Single Top 100)	29
New Zealand Hot Singles (RMNZ)	16
Nicaragua Airplay (Monitor Latino)	12
Panama Anglo Airplay (Monitor Latino)	4
Paraguay Anglo Airplay (Monitor Latino)	1
Peru Anglo Airplay (Monitor Latino)	4
Poland Airplay (OLiS)	6
Puerto Rico Airplay (Monitor Latino)	10
Romania Airplay (UPFR)	1
Romania Airplay (Media Forest)	1
Romania TV Airplay (Media Forest)	2
Russia Airplay (TopHit)	36
Serbia Airplay (Radiomonitor)	9
Slovakia Airplay (ČNS IFPI)	1
Slovenia Airplay (Radiomonitor)	1
South Korea BGM (Circle)	144
Spain Airplay (Promusicae)	11
Sweden (Sverigetopplistan)	70
Sweden Airplay (Radiomonitor)	4
Switzerland (Schweizer Hitparade)	34
Ukraine Airplay (TopHit)	17
UK Singles Sales (OCC)	72
Uruguay Anglo Airplay (Monitor Latino)	3
US Billboard Hot 100	90
US Adult Contemporary (Billboard)	16
US Adult Pop Airplay (Billboard)	6
US Hot Dance/Electronic Songs (Billboard)	2
US Pop Airplay (Billboard)	14
Venezuela Anglo Airplay (Monitor Latino)	2

==== Monthly charts ====
Monthly chart performance for "Forever Young"
Chart (2024–2025)	Peak position
Belarus Airplay (TopHit)	71
CIS Airplay (TopHit)	11
Czech Republic Airplay (ČNS IFPI)	1
Estonia Airplay (TopHit)	7
Latvia Airplay (TopHit)	39
Lithuania Airplay (TopHit)	2
Moldova Airplay (TopHit)	12
Romania Airplay (TopHit)	1
Russia Airplay (TopHit)	42
Slovakia Airplay (ČNS IFPI)	5
Ukraine Airplay (TopHit)	41

==== Year-end charts ====
2024 year-end chart performance for "Forever Young"
Chart (2024)	Position
Hungary (Dance Top 40)	72

2025 year-end chart performance for "Forever Young"
Chart (2025)	Position
Argentina Anglo Airplay (Monitor Latino)	73
Belgium (Ultratop 50 Wallonia)	72
Canada AC (Billboard)	31
Canada CHR/Top 40 (Billboard)	57
Canada Hot AC (Billboard)	35
CIS Airplay (TopHit)	37
Estonia Airplay (TopHit)	96
France (SNEP)	154
Germany (GfK)	71
Hungary (Dance Top 40)	7
Lithuania Airplay (TopHit)	30
Moldova Airplay (TopHit)	103
Netherlands (Dutch Top 40)	60
Poland (Polish Airplay Top 100)	24
Romania Airplay (TopHit)	5
Russia Airplay (TopHit)	198
US Adult Contemporary (Billboard)	31
US Adult Pop Airplay (Billboard)	25
US Hot Dance/Electronic Songs (Billboard)	4
US Pop Airplay (Billboard)	45

=== Certifications ===
Certifications for "Forever Young"
Region	Certification	Certified units/sales
France (SNEP)	Platinum	200,000^{‡}
Switzerland (IFPI Switzerland)	Gold	15,000^{‡}
^{‡} Sales+streaming figures based on certification alone.

=== Release history ===
Release dates and formats for "Forever Young"
Region	Date	Format(s)	Label(s)	Ref.
Various	18 October 2024	Digital download; streaming	Warner	
Italy	18 October 2024	Airplay	Warner	
United States	22 October 2024	Contemporary hit radio	Warner	

== Samples and covers ==
- In 1999, Czech singer Karel Gott released a cover in Czech, called "Být stále mlád" (To be forever young)
- In 2008, Czech singer Karel Gott and German rapper Bushido performed a duet called "Für immer jung" (Forever Young), released on Bushido's album "Heavy Metal Payback".
- In 2009, American rapper Jay-Z sampled a reworked 1992 version of the Wayne Wonder cover (which now featured Buju Banton and Stone Love) for his album The Blueprint 3. Retitled "Young Forever", Jay-Z's rap version featured Mr Hudson and reached number 10 on the UK Singles Chart.
- In 2010, One Direction recorded a cover that was set to be released as their winner's single had they had won Series 7 of The X Factor. However, since they placed third, the cover was never officially released and only became available to the public after it leaked online.
- In 2019, Undressd released a cover that charted in Sweden peaking at number 40 on Sverigetopplistan, the official Swedish singles chart.
- Also in 2019, Frederick Lloyd, under his "Ursine Vulpine" alias, recorded a cover of the song. His cover was featured in the trailer to the 2019 film Gemini Man as well as the 2021 video game New World.
- At the end of 2019, a version of the song by American singer-songwriter Andrea von Kampen was recorded for the Hafod Hardware Christmas advertisement.
- In 2023, American singer Anastacia covered "Forever Young" for her studio album Our Songs.
- In January 2026, American band Boyce Avenue released a piano, vocal and strings cover of "Forever Young"

== See also ==
- List of Billboard number-one dance songs of 2025
