= Big in Japan (Alphaville song) =

1984 single by Alphaville

Single by Alphaville

from the album Forever Young
- B-side: "Seeds"
- Released: 12 January 1984
- Recorded: 1983
- Genre: Synth-pop
- Length: 3:52 (single edit/video version); 4:43 (album version); 7:25 (extended remix)
- Label: WEA
- Songwriters: Marian Gold; Bernhard Lloyd; Frank Mertens
- Producer: Orlando (Wolfgang Loos)

Alphaville singles chronology
"Big in Japan" (1984)	"Sounds Like a Melody" (1984)

Music video
- "Big in Japan" on YouTube

"Big in Japan" is the debut single by the German synth-pop band Alphaville, that led to the production of their 1984 album Forever Young.

The single was a success in many countries, including West Germany, Sweden and Switzerland. It was also the group's only UK top 75 hit, reaching No. 8 on the U.K. Singles Chart. The song also reached No. 1 on the U.S. Hot Dance Club Play chart in December 1984.

In a 2022 interview, Alphaville lead singer Marian Gold said that it is "a great privilege" to have "Big in Japan" and "Forever Young" in "their luggage" when touring, and that he is grateful to be able to perform the songs.

== Recording ==
"Big in Japan" and the single's B-side "Seeds" were two of three tracks recorded in 1983 for the single. The remainder of the album Forever Young was recorded in July and August of 1984.

The group employed a Roland System-100M to create the bassline. The timing of the song was influenced by "The Safety Dance", changing the speed to double-time halfway through the song. The melody was developed by all three members of the band, working in their home studio. Backing vocals were provided by the Berlin vocal group Wednesday.

Marian Gold developed most of the lyrics while visiting a dentist. The theme was based on two friends who were involved in the sordid drug scene of West Berlin's Zoo station. The refrain "big in Japan" symbolises the idea of being successful in another world, a fantasy about being drug-free. Gold said: "That line has a certain meaning. It means that if you're a complete loser, you're telling other people, 'I'm not a loser because in Japan I'm really big.' It's the lie of the loser and it fitted perfectly into the story of these junkies, which the song is about, in a very tragic way." Gold later explained: "We originally weren’t sure whether we should put it on the album, because it’s a bit autobiographical in that it reflects my time in West Berlin in the late 70s, with the drug scene around the train station and the zoo, and all the underground things. It has nothing to do with Japan."

The phrase was inspired by the name of the band Big in Japan. Gold said: "As you know, there's a considerable musical market in Japan. If you wanted to become famous, what you should do was to form a hard rock group and then release an album over there; it would definitely sell well ... so the story went ..."

== Release and promotion ==
In reaching No. 1 on the West German singles chart, the song displaced "Relax" by Frankie Goes to Hollywood, whose lead singer Holly Johnson had been a member of the band Big in Japan. Gold considered this a remarkable coincidence and later said: "we never got to speak with him, but he must have wondered 'who is this German group with a song named after my band?' ".

An accompanying music video was directed by Dieter Meier from the band Yello. The cover art for the single is by Ulf Meyer zu Kueingdorf.

== Original 1984 release ==
=== Track listings ===
7" single

1. "Big in Japan" (7" version) – 3:52
2. "Seeds" – 3:15

12" maxi

1. "Big in Japan" (7" version) – 3:52
2. "Seeds" – 3:15

12" maxi Germany & France WEA 249417–0

1. "Big in Japan" (extended remix) – 7:25
2. "Big in Japan" (extended instrumental) – 6:10

12" maxi US WEA 0–86947

1. "Big in Japan" (extended vocal) – 7:25
2. "Big in Japan" (instrumental version) – 6:10
3. "Big in Japan" (7" version) – 3:58

=== Charts ===
==== Weekly charts ====
Chart (1984)	Peak position
Australia (Kent Music Report)	67
Austria (Ö3 Austria Top 40)	4
Belgium (Ultratop 50 Flanders)	2
Canada Top Singles (RPM)	67
Europe (Eurochart Hot 100)	1
France (SNEP)	13
Ireland (IRMA)	4
Netherlands (Dutch Top 40)	2
Netherlands (Single Top 100)	5
Norway (VG-lista)	3
Quebec (ADISQ)	10
South Africa (Springbok Radio)	5
Spain (AFYVE)	2
Sweden (Sverigetopplistan)	1
Switzerland (Schweizer Hitparade)	1
UK Singles (Official Charts)	8
Uruguay (UPI)	4
US Billboard Hot 100	66
US Billboard Hot Dance Club Play	1
West Germany (GfK)	1

Chart (2024)	Peak position
Poland (Polish Airplay Top 100)	51

==== Year-end charts ====
Chart (1984)	Position
Austria (Ö3 Austria Top 40)	26
Belgium (Ultratop 50 Flanders)	27
Netherlands (Dutch Top 40)	35
Netherlands (Single Top 100)	42
South Africa (Springbok Radio)	20
Switzerland (Schweizer Hitparade)	2
UK Singles (OCC)	66
West Germany (Official German Charts)	5

=== Certification ===
Region	Certification	Certified units/sales
Germany (BVMI)	Gold	250,000^{^}
Italy (FIMI)	Gold	50,000^{‡}
Spain (Promusicae)	Gold	30,000^{‡}
United Kingdom (BPI)	Silver	200,000^{‡}
^{^} Shipments figures based on certification alone.^{‡} Sales+streaming figures based on certification alone.

== 1992 re-release ==
"Big in Japan 1992 A.D."

Single by Alphaville
- A-side: "Big in Japan 1992 A.D."
- Released: 1992
- Label: Warner Music
- Songwriters: Bernhard Lloyd; Marian Gold; Frank Mertens

Alphaville singles chronology
"The Mysteries of Love" (1990)	"Big in Japan 1992 A.D." (1992)	"Fools" (1994)

Marian Gold singles chronology
"Big in Japan 1992 A.D." (1992)	"And I Wonder" (1992)

Alphaville rereleased the song, with new remixes, in 1992 to coincide with the release of their compilation album First Harvest 1984–92.

=== Track listings ===
EU CD single "Big in Japan 1992 A.D."

1. "Big in Japan 1992 A.D. Freedom Mix" (single edit) – 3:14
2. "Big in Japan the Mix" (single edit) – 4:14
3. "Big in Japan 1992 A.D. Freedom Mix" (extended version) – 4:51
4. "Big in Japan the Mix" (extended version) – 6:05 (same as the "Culture Mix" from First Harvest 1984–92)

EU CD single "Big in Japan Swemix Remix"

1. "Big in Japan" (Swemix remix 7") – 3:57
2. "Big in Japan" (Swemix remix 12") – 8:27
3. "Big in Japan" (Swemix dub) – 6:44

EU 12" vinyl single "Big in Japan 1992 A.D." (white vinyl)

1. "Big in Japan 1992 A.D. Freedom Mix" (extended version) – 4:51
2. "Big in Japan 1992 A.D. Freedom Dub" – 4:56
3. "Big in Japan the Mix" (extended version) – 6:05

=== Charts ===
"Big in Japan 1992 AD" reached No. 2 in Finland and No. 15 in Sweden.

== Guano Apes version ==
"Big in Japan"

Single by Guano Apes

from the album Don't Give Me Names
- B-side: "I Want It"; "Gogan"; "La Noix"
- Released: 20 March 2000
- Length: 2:49
- Label: Supersonic
- Songwriters: Bernhard Lloyd; Marian Gold; Frank Mertens
- Producers: Guano Apes; Wolfgang Stach; Fabio Trentini

Guano Apes singles chronology
"Don't You Turn Your Back on Me" (1999)	"Big in Japan" (2000)	"No Speech" (2000)

Music video
- "Big in Japan" on YouTube

In 2000, Guano Apes released a cover version of "Big in Japan" as the lead single for their second album Don't Give Me Names on 12 April 2000. The music video shows the band performing in an empty arena, followed by a fan trying to locate them.

=== Track listings ===
CD single

1. "Big in Japan" – 2:49
2. "Gogan" – 2:47
3. "I Want It" – 3:17

7" single

1. "Big in Japan" – 2:48
2. "I Want It" – 3:15

Maxi single

1. "Big in Japan" – 2:49
2. "Gogan" – 2:47
3. "I Want It" – 3:17
4. "La Noix" – 2:19
5. "Big in Japan" (Space Jazz Dubmen mix) – 4:32

=== Charts ===
Chart (2000)	Peak position
Austria (Ö3 Austria Top 40)	19
Belgium (Ultratip Bubbling Under Flanders)	4
Germany (GfK)	9
Italy (FIMI)	5
Netherlands (Single Top 100)	82
Switzerland (Schweizer Hitparade)	24

== See also ==
- List of European number-one hits of 1984
- List of number-one dance singles of 1984 (U.S.)
- List of number-one hits of 1984 (West Germany)
- List of number-one singles and albums in Sweden
- List of number-one singles of the 1980s (Switzerland)
