= Alphaville (band) =

German synth-pop band

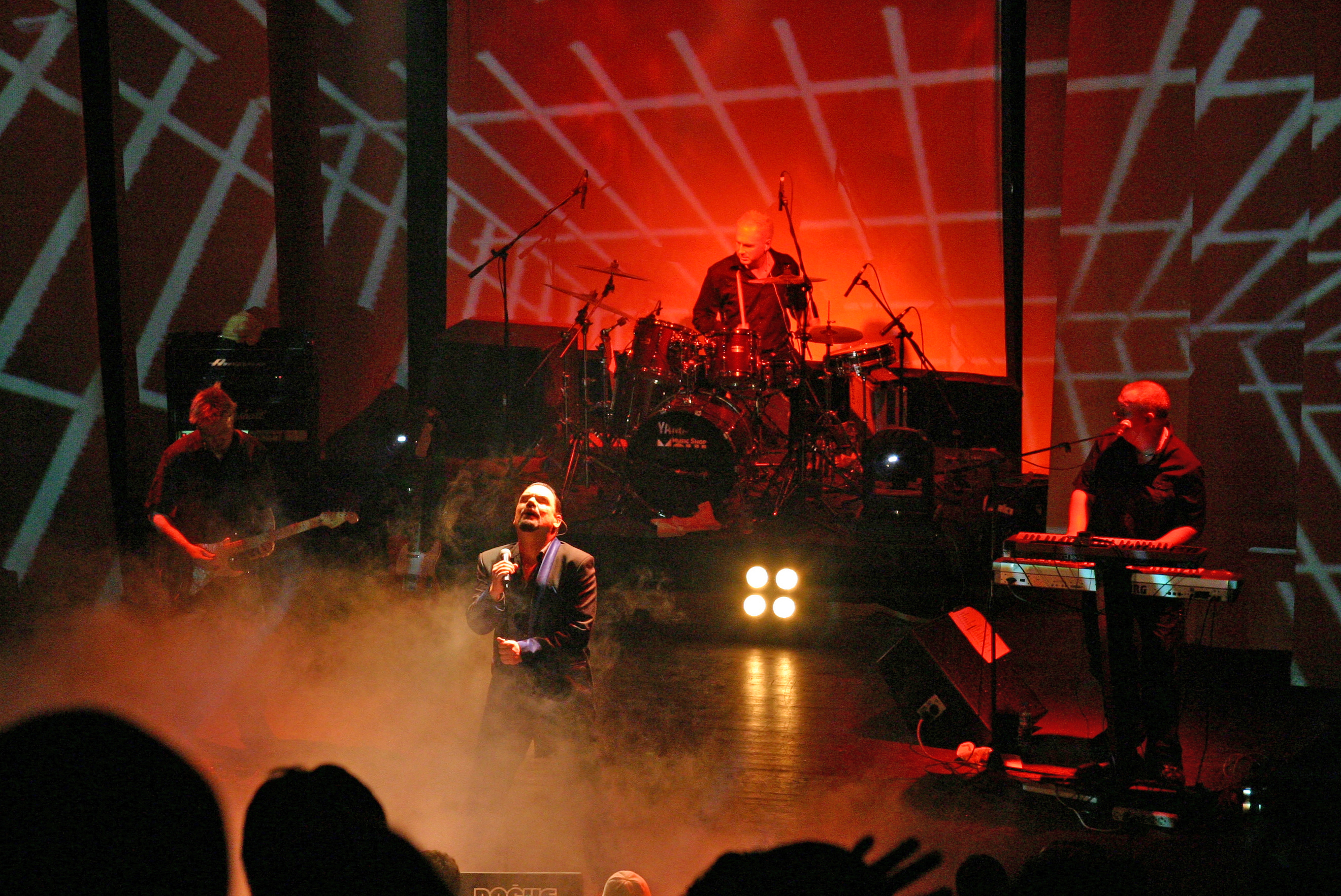
- Alphaville performing in 2005

Background information
- Also known as: Forever Young
- Origin: Münster, West Germany
- Genre: Synth-pop
- Years active: 1982–present
- Labels: Atlantic; Metropolis; Polydor; Warner Bros.
- Members: Marian Gold; Carsten Brocker; Alexandra Merl; Lars Kutschke; Patrick Metzger
- Past members: Bernhard Lloyd; Frank Mertens; Ricky Echolette; Martin Lister; David Goodes; Robbie France; Rob Harris; Shane Meehan; Jakob Kiersch; Maja Kim
- Website: www.alphaville.earth

Alphaville is a German synth-pop band formed in Münster in 1982. They gained popularity in the 1980s. The group was founded by singer Marian Gold and musicians Bernhard Lloyd and Frank Mertens. They achieved chart success with the singles "Forever Young", "Big in Japan", "Sounds Like a Melody", "The Jet Set", and "Dance with Me". Gold remains the only continuous original member of Alphaville. They took their name from Jean-Luc Godard's 1965 film Alphaville.

== History ==
=== Formation ===
Alphaville was formed after lead singer Marian Gold and Bernhard Lloyd met in West Berlin in 1981. The pair were heavily influenced by UK indie acts like Tubeway Army, Gary Numan and Orchestral Manoeuvres in the Dark. Gold had written "Big in Japan" in 1979 after hearing the music of Holly Johnson's band Big in Japan. They first named their band 'Forever Young' and subsequently changed it to 'Alphaville' after the 1965 science fiction film. Together the three (Gold, Lloyd, and Frank Mertens) wrote and recorded "Forever Young" as a demo. The first Alphaville concert took place on 31 December 1982 in Enger, Westphalia.

In 1984, the newly renamed Alphaville released their debut single, "Big in Japan". In the early years, Gold said that "none of us could really play an instrument. The music was in our heads, but we were dependent on synthesizers and drum machines and things like that. ... The equipment we had at that time was basically toys – the cheapest monophonic synthesizers you could imagine. We had a little studio in a basement, made a couple of demos and sent them to some record companies to try to get a deal. We didn't have much hope, but we had three offers and from that moment everything happened very fast."

=== Forever Young (1984) ===
In autumn 1984, they released their debut album, Forever Young, produced by Colin Pearson, Wolfgang Loos and Andreas Budde.

"Big in Japan" topped the charts in West Germany, Greece, Switzerland, Sweden, Turkey, Venezuela, and the US Billboard Dance Chart (the group's only Top 10 on any Billboard chart). The single also reached the Top Five in the Netherlands, Norway, Austria, Ireland and South Africa. It became the group's only Top 20 single in the UK, peaking at No. 8.

The band's next two singles, "Sounds Like a Melody" and "Forever Young", were also both European Top 5 successes, although the former track failed to make an impression on the American charts.

Amid reports that pop star Laura Branigan was featuring the song on her next album, Hold Me, Alphaville's "Forever Young" was re-released as a single in the US. The Alphaville version was released a third time in the US in 1988, to promote Alphaville: The Singles Collection, and peaked at No. 65, their highest charting (and also last) single on the Billboard Hot 100.

Despite the success of the album and its singles, the band did not tour. Said Gold, "we didn't feel we were good enough musicians [to tour]. These days it wouldn't be a problem to go out and play with tracks, but at that time it was really complicated. We didn't feel like we were performers. We felt more like we were studio rats. The studio felt like a safe environment. So, much to the annoyance of our manager, we didn't play [live] very much."

Despite their commercial success in the United Kingdom in the 1980s, Alphaville has never performed live in the UK. Soon after the success of the album, Mertens left the band in December 1984. He was replaced in January 1985 by Ricky Echolette on keyboard and guitar.

In a 2022 interview, Marian Gold said it is "a bit of a shock" when he hears "Forever Young" playing when he is in an elevator or at the supermarket.

In 2024, Alphaville's single "Forever Young" reached number 1 on the TikTok Billboard Top 50 chart, 40 years after its original release. The success of the song reaching No. 1 on the charts was linked to its popularity on the social media app TikTok. "Forever Young" remained at number 1 for ten weeks in 2024.

=== Afternoons in Utopia (1986) ===
In 1986, their second album, Afternoons in Utopia, was released and its first single "Dance With Me" was a Top 20 hit in Germany, Spain, France, Norway, Sweden, Switzerland, South Africa and in remix form on the US Hot Maxi Singles chart. It reached the Top 30 in Austria, Italy and in the US Club Play chart. The album's second single was "Universal Daddy". For their third single, the band released "Jerusalem" in Germany only, while they went with "Sensations" for Austria, France, the Netherlands, and Switzerland. The final single from Afternoons in Utopia was "Red Rose", in 1987.

=== The Breathtaking Blue (1989) ===
Their third album in 1989, The Breathtaking Blue, included the singles "Romeos" and "Mysteries of Love" and was released as a CD+G, including black & white stills with original lyrics and German translation. As an alternative to individual music videos, the band enlisted nine directors, among them Godfrey Reggio (Koyaanisqatsi), to create a film entitled Songlines based on the album's tracks.

=== Prostitute (1994) ===
The next album, Prostitute, was not released until 1994. The first single released was "Fools", followed by the second and last single from the album, "The Impossible Dream". During the tour for this album Robbie France briefly joined the band on drums. In 1997, after the band went to record their next album, Echolette left the band because he decided to spend time with his family.

=== Salvation (1997) ===
Salvation followed in 1997. A limited edition box-set, Dreamscapes, was issued in 1999. In 2000 Stark Naked and Absolutely Live was released. In 2001, the remix album Forever Pop and a DVD entitled Little America of two concerts performed in Salt Lake City, Utah. Bernhard Lloyd did not contribute to the second limited edition box-set, the 2003 CrazyShow, and shortly after its release on 18 March 2003, he officially left the group; however, he stays in contact with Gold. The core stage members of Alphaville then were Gold and new recruits, Martin Lister (keyboards), David Goodes (guitars) and Jakob Kiersch (drums).

=== Catching Rays on Giant (2010) ===
On 19 November 2010 the album Catching Rays on Giant, the first commercial studio album in 13 years was released and entered the German album charts at number 9 in its first week. The touring musicians became members of the band at this point. The second single from the album was the track, "Song for No One", released on 4 March 2011. The band held an album release party, where they played a short unplugged set, at the Quasimodo Club in Berlin on the evening of 18 November 2010 to which their closest fans and friends were invited. The album featured band member Martin Lister on lead vocals for the track, "Call Me Down". In 2011 Maja Kim joined the band on bass.

The first single and album releases were available at first only in Germany and through online shops and download platforms in German-speaking countries. The first single from album was titled "I Die for You Today", available as a digital download on 8 October 2010, released in CD format on 22 October 2010. It entered the German charts at number 15 in its first week of release and stayed in the top 100 for 8 weeks. In March 2011 Alphaville toured the album across Germany and had signed a new deal with the Universal Music Group.

On 21 May 2014, Martin Lister died unexpectedly, announced by the band via their Facebook page and Yahoo mailing list, a few days later. He was replaced by Carsten Brocker. In 2016, bassist Maja Kim left to follow new challenges, with the position filled by Alexandra Merl.

=== Strange Attractor (2017) ===
Strange Attractor was released on 7 April 2017 after an extremely long production time, with a video for the single "Heartbreak City". In August 2017, they performed a Concert Tour in Houston, New York City, Chicago, and San Jose and Burbank, California.

=== 2018–present: Collaboration and Eternally Yours ===
For the 35th anniversary of the group in 2018, Alphaville held a concert on 25 and 26 May at the Whisky A Go-Go club in Los Angeles, California. In 2019, the LA Concert Group issued a limited box set recording of this show containing five CDs, two DVDs and two Blu-ray discs.

In 2021, Alphaville teamed up with Schiller and released a new version of "Summer in Berlin" as Schiller x Alphaville.

On 7 February 2022, Gold announced a symphonic album of Alphaville songs to be released by the end of 2022, supported by the release of three singles over the course of the year. "Big in Japan" was released on 29 April as the first song from the album. On 11 June, "Sounds Like a Melody" was released as the second song from the album, now titled Eternally Yours. "Dance With Me" was revealed to be the third song on 27 July, as part of a podcast presented by Gold and his daughter Lily Becker. Eternally Yours released on 23 September 2022, containing new symphonic versions of sixteen Alphaville songs, plus a new song also titled "Eternally Yours".

On 27 September 2024, a compilation album titled Forever! Best of 40 Years was released to commemorate the fortieth anniversary of the group's breakthrough. The compilation consisted of three CDs, and contained songs from all of the group's studio albums including Eternally Yours.

On August 6th, Alphaville‘s split with their drummer Jakob Kiersch was announced, his replacement being Patrick Metzger.

== Projects ==
Gold has released two solo albums (So Long Celeste, 1992, and United, 1996, both mixing personal creations and covers), alongside his work in the band.

Lloyd also worked on a project named Atlantic Popes with singer Max Holler, releasing a 13-track CD.

Alphaville participated in Night of the Proms in 2002, performing "Big in Japan" and "Forever Young". Gold also contributed to a group performance of "Let It Be" with other performers at the event.

On 25–26 May 2018, Alphaville and Marian Gold played two nights at the Whisky a Go Go club in Hollywood. The two concerts were also live streamed.

On 15 March 2019, the album Forever Young was remastered for the 35th anniversary.

On 7 May 2021, the albums "Afternoons in Utopia" and "The Breathtaking Blue" was remastered after the successful reissue of the album Forever Young.

To support the upcoming release of the symphonic album Eternally Yours in 2022, Gold and his daughter Lily Becker began a podcast discussing Alphaville songs and the album.

== Political activism ==
In 2026, Alphaville's management objected to the band's songs being played on "Austria First", the radio station of the Austrian far-right FPÖ party, stating they would take legal action against it if possible. The band also distanced themselves from the use of its songs by Germany's AfD party, although they had been unable to stop this through legal means.

In April 2026, they objected to their song "Forever Young" being used by US President Donald Trump. On Truth Social, he uploaded an AI generated video with their song as background music.

Alphaville's singer Marian Gold stated on Instagram:

[...] As we, the band Alphaville, do not in any way agree with Trump's political views and, in fact, largely abhor them, we will ensure that this post is removed from the internet immediately. [...]

— Marian Gold

== Legacy ==
Alphaville's song "Forever Young" was featured in the movie Listen to Me (1989) featuring Kirk Cameron in one of his first film roles. "Forever Young" was played in a high school prom-related scene in the 2004 film Napoleon Dynamite. "Forever Young" was also featured in the Canadian movie 1987 (2014), as well as a 2014 episode of Regular Show, Skip's Story.

In 2006, Australian guitar band Youth Group took their remake of "Forever Young" to No. 1 in the Official Australian Chart.

"Young Forever" is the fourth single by American hip hop rapper Jay-Z from his album The Blueprint 3 on the Roc Nation label. It is a mild rework of Alphaville's 1984 song "Forever Young": the original melody is retained, Mr Hudson sings the original lyrics (primarily during the chorus), and Jay-Z raps in place of the verses.

In 2024, Alphaville's single "Forever Young" gained popularity on the social media app TikTok, 40 years after the song's release. "Forever Young" gained so much popularity via the app, that the song reached No. 1 on the TikTok Billboard Top 50 chart in October 2024. TikTok was widely credited for the gain in popularity of the song in 2024.

== Band members ==
=== Current members ===
- Marian Gold – lead vocals (1982–present)
- Carsten Brocker – keyboards, drum programming (2014–present)
- Alexandra Merl – bass guitar, keyboards, backing vocals (2016–present)
- Lars Kutschke – guitars (2025–present)
- Patrick Metzger – drums (2026–present)

=== Former members ===
- Bernhard Lloyd – keyboards, guitars (1982–2003; not touring 1996–1999, 2000–2003)
- Frank Mertens – keyboards (1982–1984)
- Ricky Echolette – keyboards, guitars (1985–1997; not touring 1995–1997)
- Martin Lister – keyboards, backing vocals (2003–2014; touring 1995–2003; died 2014)
- David Goodes – guitars (2003–2025; touring 1995–1998)
- Pierson Grange – drums (2003–2009; touring 1998–1999, 2002–2003)
- Jakob Kiersch – drums (2009–2026)
- Maja Kim – bass guitar (2011–2016)

=== Touring musicians ===
- Elisabeth Markstein – backing vocals (2023–present)
- Ulrike Weidemüller – backing vocals (2023–present)

=== Former touring musicians ===
- Rudy Nielson – guitars (1993–1995)
- Hans-Joachim Behrendt – drums (1993–1995; died 2023)
- Alex Slavik – bass guitar (1995–1997)
- Robbie France – drums (1995–1997; died 2012)
- James Mack – drums (1997)
- Rob Harris – guitars, backing vocals (1998–2000)
- Shane Meehan – drums, percussion (1999–2001)
- Christian Marsac – guitars (2000–2003)

== Awards and nominations ==
Year	Awards	Work	Category	Result
1984	Goldene Europa	Themselves	Best Group	Won
1984	Rockbjörnen	Themselves	Best Foreign Group	Won
1984	Rockbjörnen	Forever Young	Best Foreign Album	Won

== Discography ==
Studio albums

- Forever Young (1984)
- Afternoons in Utopia (1986)
- The Breathtaking Blue (1989)
- Prostitute (1994)
- Salvation (1997)
- Catching Rays on Giant (2010)
- Strange Attractor (2017)
- Eternally Yours (2022)
