= Ricky Echolette =

- Born: Wolfgang Neuhaus; 6 August 1960 (age 66); Cologne, West Germany
- Genres: Synth-pop, film score
- Occupations: Musician, keyboardist, composer
- Instruments: Keyboards, piano, guitar
- Years active: 1985–1997
- Formerly of: Alphaville

Ricky Echolette (born Wolfgang Neuhaus; 6 August 1960) is a former member of the German synth-pop Alphaville. He played keyboards, piano, and guitar in the band from 1985 until his departure in 1997.

In January 1985, he replaced Frank Mertens, who left Alphaville after the release of their first album Forever Young.

Marian Gold was an old friend of his and had already asked Echolette to join the group two years earlier. Echolette had declined the offer to stay in Gold's previous group Chinchilla Green.

He left Alphaville in 1997 during the production of Salvation to live in the South of France with his family. He is credited for writing the songs along with Gold and Bernhard Lloyd, but did not play on the album.
