= Marian Gold =

German singer-songwriter (born 1954)

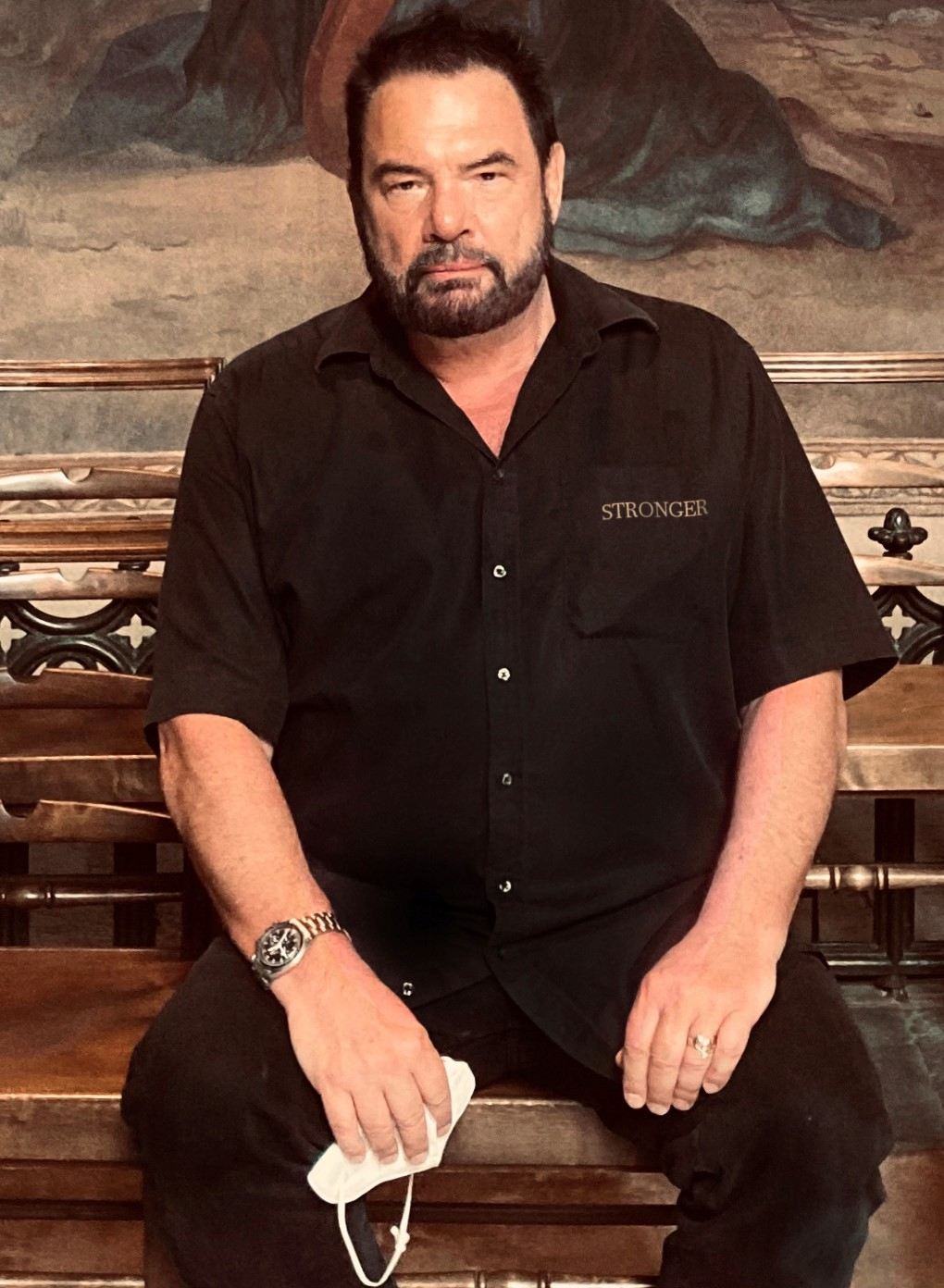
- Gold in 2021

Background information
- Born: Hartwig Schierbaum; 26 May 1954 (age 72); Herford, West Germany
- Genres: Synth-pop
- Occupations: Singer; songwriter
- Instrument: Vocals
- Years active: 1979–present

Marian Gold (born Hartwig Schierbaum; 26 May 1954) is a German singer-songwriter who gained fame as the lead singer of the German synth-pop band Alphaville, but also has recorded as a solo artist. He is known for his tenor multi-octave vocal range.

== Biography ==
=== Early life ===
Born in Herford, West Germany, Gold was part of the Berlin art collective the Nelson Community, where he formed the band Chinchilla Green in the late 1970s, which also included future Alphaville colleague Bernhard Lloyd.

=== Alphaville ===
In 1982, he joined Lloyd and Frank Mertens in the band Forever Young, which soon became Alphaville. He sang lead vocals on Alphaville's 1980s pop singles, including "Forever Young", "Big in Japan", "Sounds Like a Melody", "Dance with Me", "Jerusalem", amongst many others.

As of 2022, he is the last remaining original member of the band, whose latest album, Eternally Yours, was released in 2022.

=== Solo ===
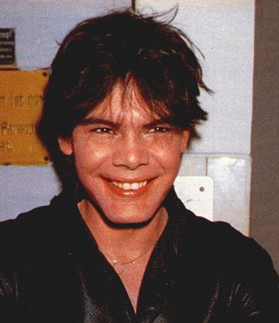
Gold in 1984

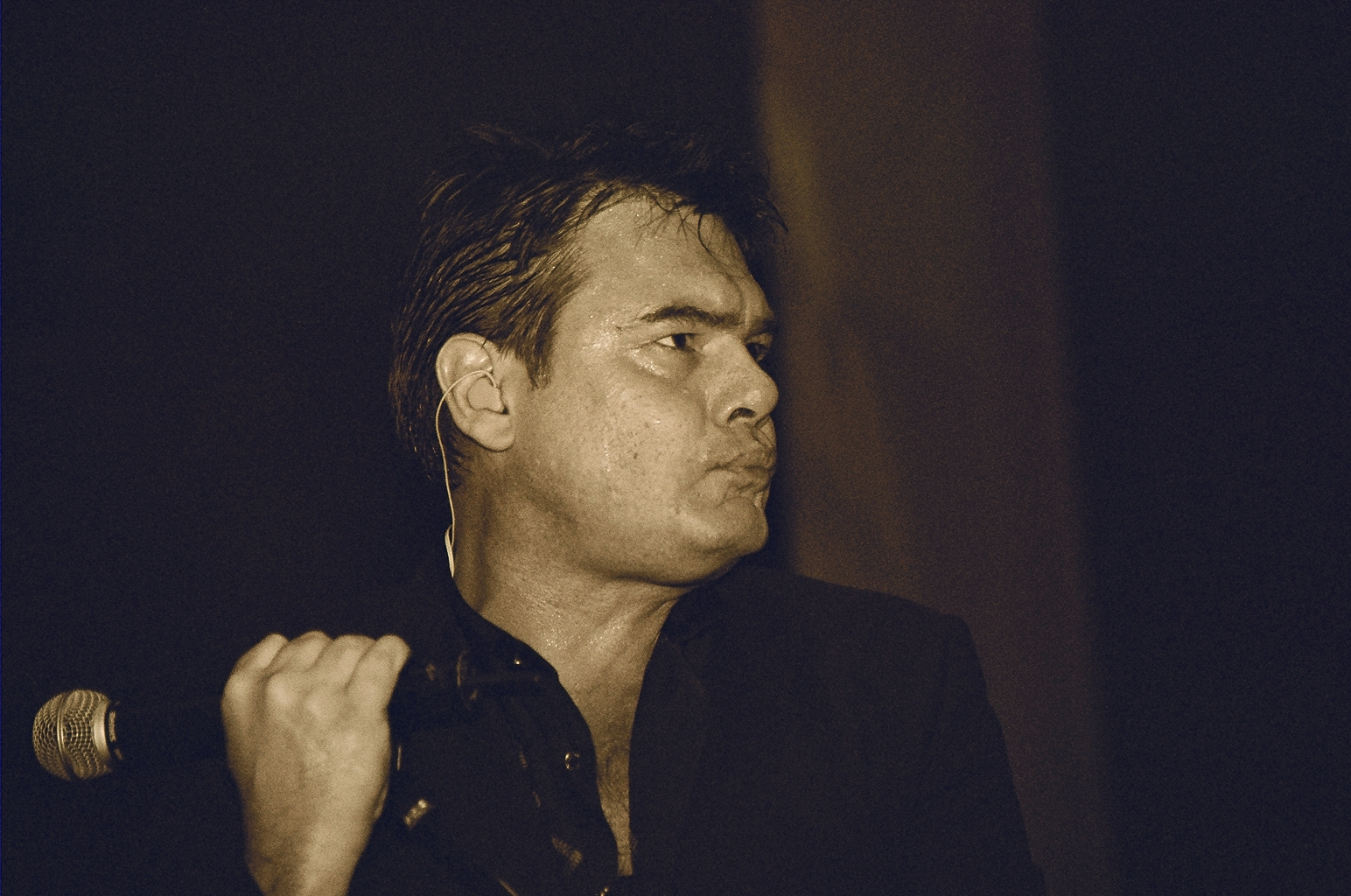
Gold performing in 2004

Gold's first solo album, So Long Celeste, was released in 1992. Included on the album are cover versions of "The Shape of Things to Come" (originally by the Headboys) and "One Step Behind You" (by Furniture).

A second solo album, United, followed in 1996.

== Personal life ==
In the late 1980s, Gold lived in Münster with his then-wife Manuela.

Gold has seven children by four different women.

== Discography ==
Studio albums

- So Long Celeste (1992)
- United (1996)
