= Bernhard Lloyd =

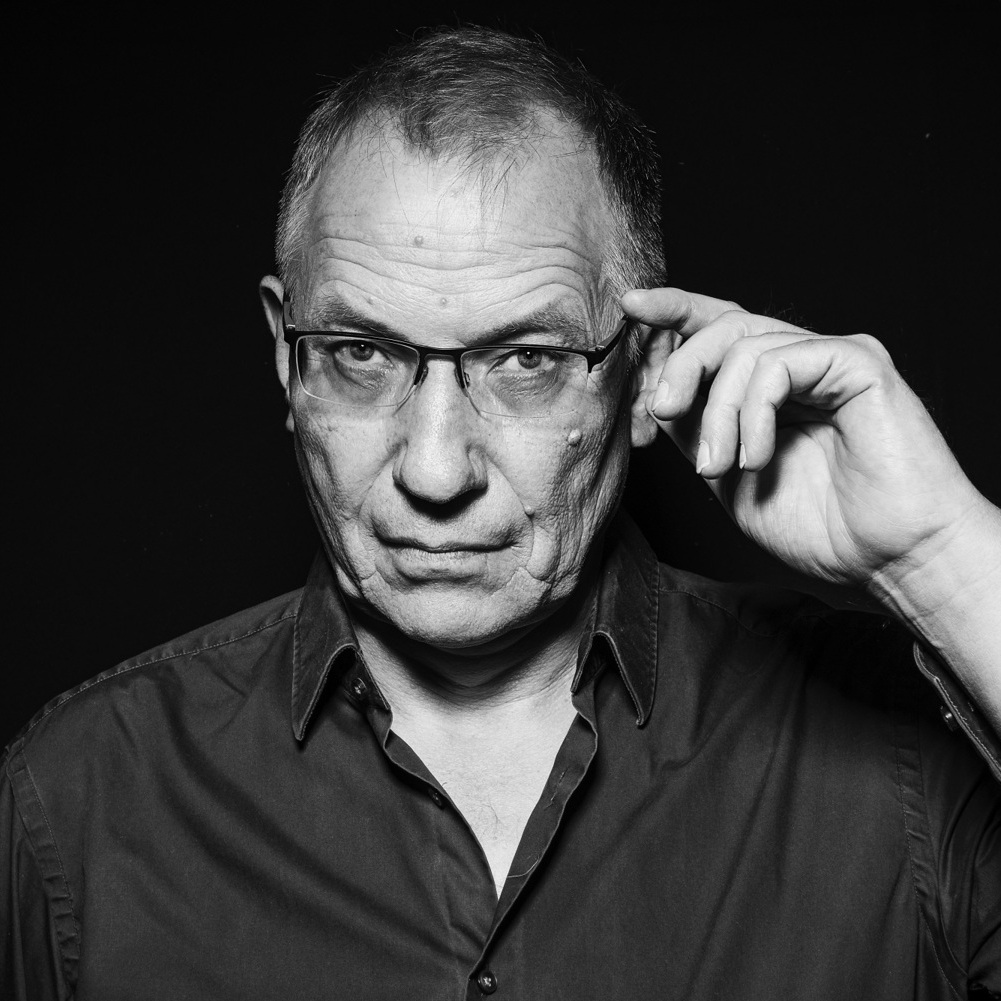

Background information
- Birth name: Bernhard Gössling
- Born: 2 June 1960 (age 64); Enger, West Germany
- Genres: Synth-pop
- Occupation: Musician
- Instruments: Keyboards, synthesizer, drum programming, guitars
- Years active: 1982-present

Bernhard Lloyd (born Bernhard Gössling on 2 June 1960) is a former member and co-founder of the German synth-pop band Alphaville.

Before he joined the band, he did not play keyboards – instead, he was previously a club DJ.

In 2001, Lloyd also worked on a project named Atlantic Popes with singer Max Holler, on a 13-track CD. He left Alphaville in 2003.

Lloyd produces for German bands in his studio, mainly electronic music in Berlin. He remixed the catalog of Alphaville, and remains in contact with lead singer Marian Gold.
