= Eternity =

Endless time or timelessness

Eternity, also sempiternity (Note: Earliest / oldest extant source: 1599: "thy muse to sempiternity") or forever, (Note: in the context of future only - also everlasting) or perpetuity, is time with no end, i.e. infinite.

In the context of human life, eternity and death are co-existing realities.

== Etymology ==
Cicero used the word aeternitatis, in the work: De Inventione 1, 27, 39., (Note: tempus autem est—id quo nunc utimur, nam ipsum quidem generaliter definire difficile est—pars quaedam aeternitatis cum alicuius annui, menstrui, diurni nocturnive spatii certa significatione.) written at some time between the years 88 - 81 BC which is an early or the earliest extant written form from which the English word is derived; first shown in history in a circa 1374 translation by Chaucer. The first usage in French is 1175: eternitez: B. de Ste-Maure, within 'ducs de Normandie.

== Philosophy ==
=== Eastern tradition ===
In traditional Chinese 永 (yǒng 'eternity') exists in the 論語 (Analects).

=== Western tradition ===
==== Classical ====
The concept of eternity formed in ancient philosophy was specifically from within the Platonic tradition. During the Classical period (8th-7th century BC (Note: In the Iliad attributed to Homer (c. 8th century BC) the gods are ἀθάνατος (ἀθανασία) καὶ ἀγήρως (appearance physically never any older through time)) - 473/529 AD) (Note: Termination of the classical era: the last Western Roman Emperor (473), the last Platonic Academy in Athens ends (529),) Plato (c. 428–423 BC - 348/347 BC) described time as a moving image of eternity (Note: 37d Τίμαιος When the father creator saw the creature which he had made moving and living, the created image of the eternal gods, he rejoiced, and in his joy determined to make the copy still more like the original; and as this was eternal, he sought to make the universe eternal, so far as might be. Now the nature of the ideal being was everlasting, but to bestow this attribute in its fulness upon a creature was impossible. Wherefore he resolved to have a moving image of eternity, and when he set in order the heaven, he made this image eternal but moving according to number, while eternity itself rests in unity; and this image we call time. — translated in 1871 the Living Being that is for ever existent, he sought to make this universe also like it, so far as might be, in that respect. on the generated thing. But he took thought to make, as it were, a moving likeness of eternity; and, at the same time that he ordered the Heaven, he made, of eternity that abides in unity, an everlasting likeness moving according to number—that to which we have given the name Time. — translated in 1937) (in Timaeus 37 D) using the word: αἰών. Plato stated the kosmos was ἁγἡρων (ageless) in Timaeus 33a, in 37e6–38a6 the eternal forms are contrasted with the temporality of the world. Aristotle (384–322 BC) stated οὐρανοῦ was eternal (in Book I of Περὶ οὐρανοῦ) and an eternal world (in Physics).

The ancient Greek word for everlastingness was ἀίδιος (aidios) as exists via Plotinus, who also used the word aoin (eternity), in Ennead III.7.

==== 17th century ====
Thomas Hobbes was re-stating the sense of the definition of Boethius when published 1662, as a response to John Wallis, he wrote that he considered that "eternity is a permanent now".

==== 19th century ====
In post revolution France, revolutionary Louis Auguste Blanqui (Note: his politics, that were: "a revolutionary voluntarism - sometimes led Blanqui to failure - nevertheless saved him from the straitjacket [marais gluant] of 'scientific' determinism.") wrote his 1872 cosmological prison literature hypothesis L'Éternité par les astres, while imprisoned in Fort du Taureau sea fortress.

== Physics ==
Camille Flammarion (1893) described eternalness as being the absolute.

In 1983; Steinhardt proposed eternal inflation, the first of two models based on Guth's inflationary model of 1981 (originating with Староби́нский (Starobinsky) 1979) of the so-called big bang theory for the explanation of the origin of the universe; the second model chaotic inflation (1983) - eternal chaotic inflation (1986), was proposed by Линде (Linde)

The possibility of eternal universes with reference to General Relativity was a subject of physics since the 21st century.

== Poetry ==
The kanji for eternity is used in the Japanese Manyōshū. The comments in The Rape of Lucrece by William Shakespeare

Who buys a minute's mirth to wail a week?
Or sells eternity to get a toy?

are in a poem based on the work of Ovid and Livy of the history of Ancient Rome particularly the rape of Lucretia by Tarquin.

== Popular culture ==
=== Comics ===
- 1976, July (Marvel Comics) The Eternals - Kirby

=== Computer games ===
- 2002 (Nintendo) Eternal Darkness: Sanity's Requiem - Dyack / Silicon Knights

=== Movies ===
- 1953 (Columbia Pictures: Taradash) From Here to Eternity - Jones 1951
- 1992, December (Warner Bros. Pictures) Forever Young - Abrams
- 1998, September (Trimark Pictures) The Eternal - Almereyda
- 2016 (Medusa Mediaset Group) Forever Young - Brizzi, Martani, Falcone
- 2021 (Marvel Studios) Eternals - Kirby 1976
- 2023 (Dark Matter Studios) Forever Young - Pretorius, Stang, Blyth

=== Music ===
- 1967, (performed by Ed Ames) Timeless Love - written by Sainte-Marie
- 1969, November (Jerry Lee Lewis) One Minute Past Eternity - Taylor and Kesler
- 1973, November (Asylum Records) Forever Young - Dylan
- 1974 (Capricorn Records) Forever Young - Dylan 1973; (Wells)
- 1979 (Sonet Records) För evigt ung - Strom
- 1984 (Warner-Elektra-Atlantic) Forever Young - Gold, Lloyd, Mertens
- 1988 (Emerald Music) Forever Young - Young
- 1989 (KLF Communications) 3AM Eternal - Cauty, Drummond
- 2009-2010 (Atlantic Records, Roc Nation - Jay-Z) Young Forever - Gold, Lloyd, Mertens 1984; Carter, West 2009
- 2010, January (Lucky 7 Records Madness): Forever Young - McPherson
- 2012 (Madness / Salvo/Union Square) Forever Young: The Ska Collection - McPherson (Madness)

=== Novels / Novella ===
- 1951 (chronology isn't known so are here placed alphabetically)

February (Scribners) From Here to Eternity - Jones
Spring edition (10 Story Fantasy) Sentinel of Eternity - Clarke

- 1962 (Dell Books) The Eternal Champion - Moorcock mid 1950s

=== Perfume ===
- Eternity - Calvin Klein / Calvin Klein Inc.

=== Sport ===
- 1999 (The Baseball Reliquary) Shrine of the Eternals - Cannon

=== Television ===
- 1983 (Goldcrest Films) Forever Young - Connolly
- 2013 (3 Ball Productions & Katalyst) Forever Young - Kutcher, Goldberg
- 2024 (GMA Entertainment Group) Forever Young - Nova

== Religion ==
Eternity as infinite duration is an important concept in many lives and religions. God or gods are often said to endure eternally, or exist for all time, forever, without beginning or end. Religious views of an afterlife may speak of it in terms of eternity or eternal life. (Note: For examples: Bassali (2008), p. 138, quote: "In the next life, there will be two places only - heaven and hell. ... In heaven, you will spend an eternity of bliss, light, and glory with God. In hell, you will spend an eternity of woe, darkness and torment apart from God. Which of these two places would you prefer to spend your eternity?")

=== Abrahamic religions ===
In Genesis 21:33 of the Old Testament El-Olam is God-Eternal.

Jesus In the Gospels explicitly threatens the wicked with an eternal punishment. In the context of Revelation 14: 9-11 of the Bible, the book Revelation describes how smoke from application of burning sulphur onto those who worship the beast will transit upwardly forever. The position onto which sinners are condemned for all time into hell, if the souls are punished in a conscious state of existence, is known as traditionalism, and annihilationism if the punishment on arrival in the infernal dominion is that their consciousness is then annulled-extincted. Thomas Aquinas (c. 1225 – 1274) believed in an eternal God, without either a beginning or end; the concept of eternity is of divine simplicity, thus incapable of being defined or fully understood by humankind. Christian theologians may regard immutability, like the eternal Platonic forms, as essential to eternity. (Note: Deng (2018), quote: "Augustine connects God's timeless eternity to God's being the cause of all times and God's immutability.")

In the Islamic context, while azal indicates eternity at the beginning of known time and abad at the end; sarmad indicates all (both) aspects, this latter as an adjectival form is in surah 28 parts 71 and 72 of the Qur'an. In Islamic culture the eternity of the universe was a subject in the writings of Abu Ali ibn Sīna (died 1037), Abu Hamid al-Ghazali, Abu Walid Muhammad Ibn Rushd.

=== Egyptian ===
Ancient Egyptian eternity terms were neheh, for cyclical time, and djet, for linear. Rameses III (c.1187-1156 B.C.E.) funerary temple was: 'United-with -Eternity'.

=== Greco-Roman ===
Mythic Iliadical ἀθάνατος (athanatos) is the immortal.

The ancient greek word for everlasting, and/or eternal, exists in the Orphica Hymni.

The timelessness in divinity of classical period Augustine (354–430 AD), as exists in Book XI of the Confessions, and Boethius (c. 480–524), in Book V of the Consolation of Philosophy were adopted as the reality of the subject for later thinkers in the western tradition of philosophy. Boethius stated eternity was: interminabilis vitae tota simul et perfecta possessio, which is translated as "simultaneously full and perfect possession of interminable life". (Note: Boethius (523), book 5, prose §. 6, quote: "Aeternitas igitur est interminabilis uitae tota simul et perfecta possessio") and nunc permanens, which in English is a: permanent now.

=== Vedic ===
Within the Vedic Rigveda, Aditi, as a goddess, is eternal.

== Images ==
=== Fine art ===
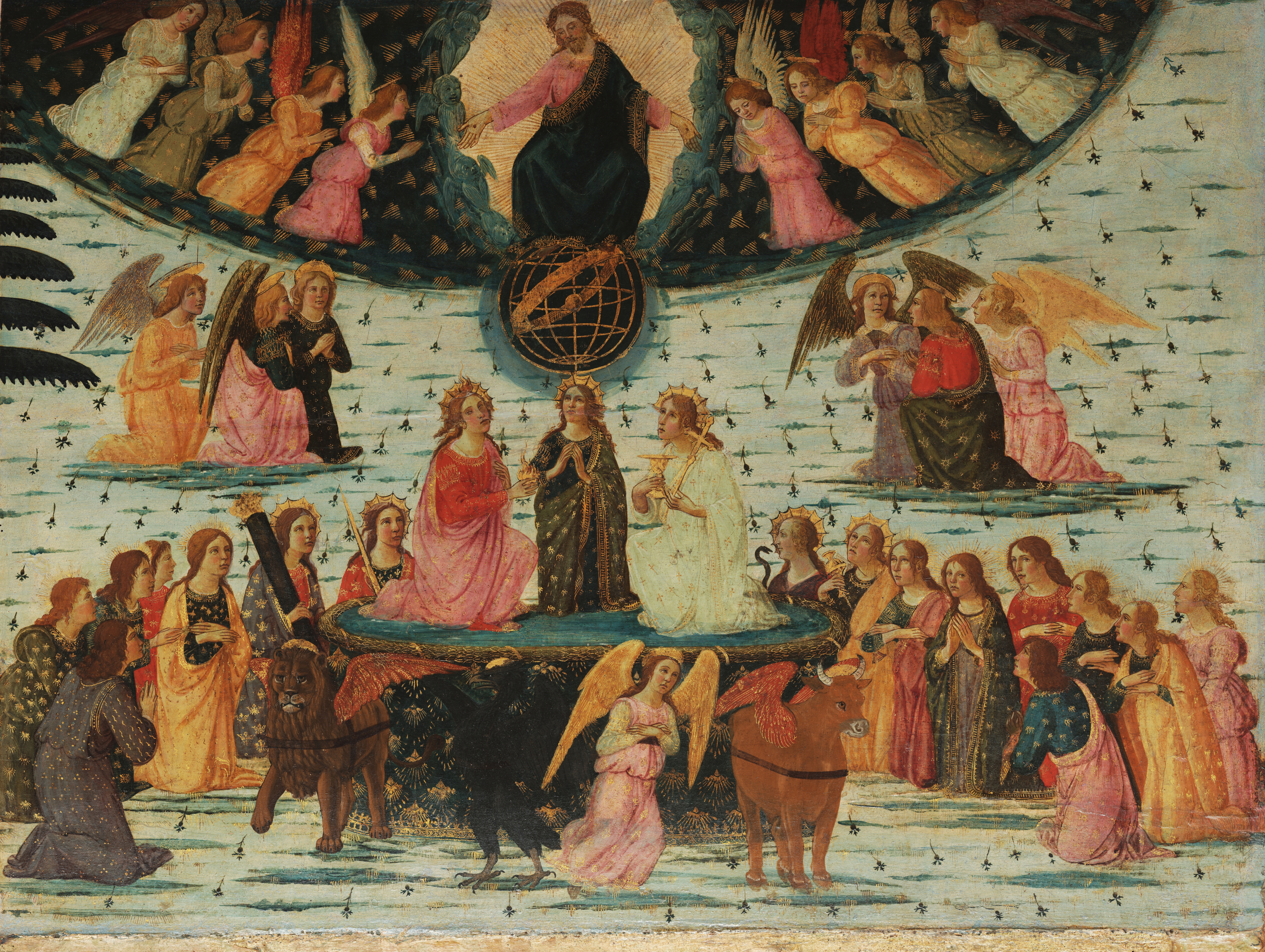
Jacopo da Sellaio, Triumph of Eternity, 1485–1490

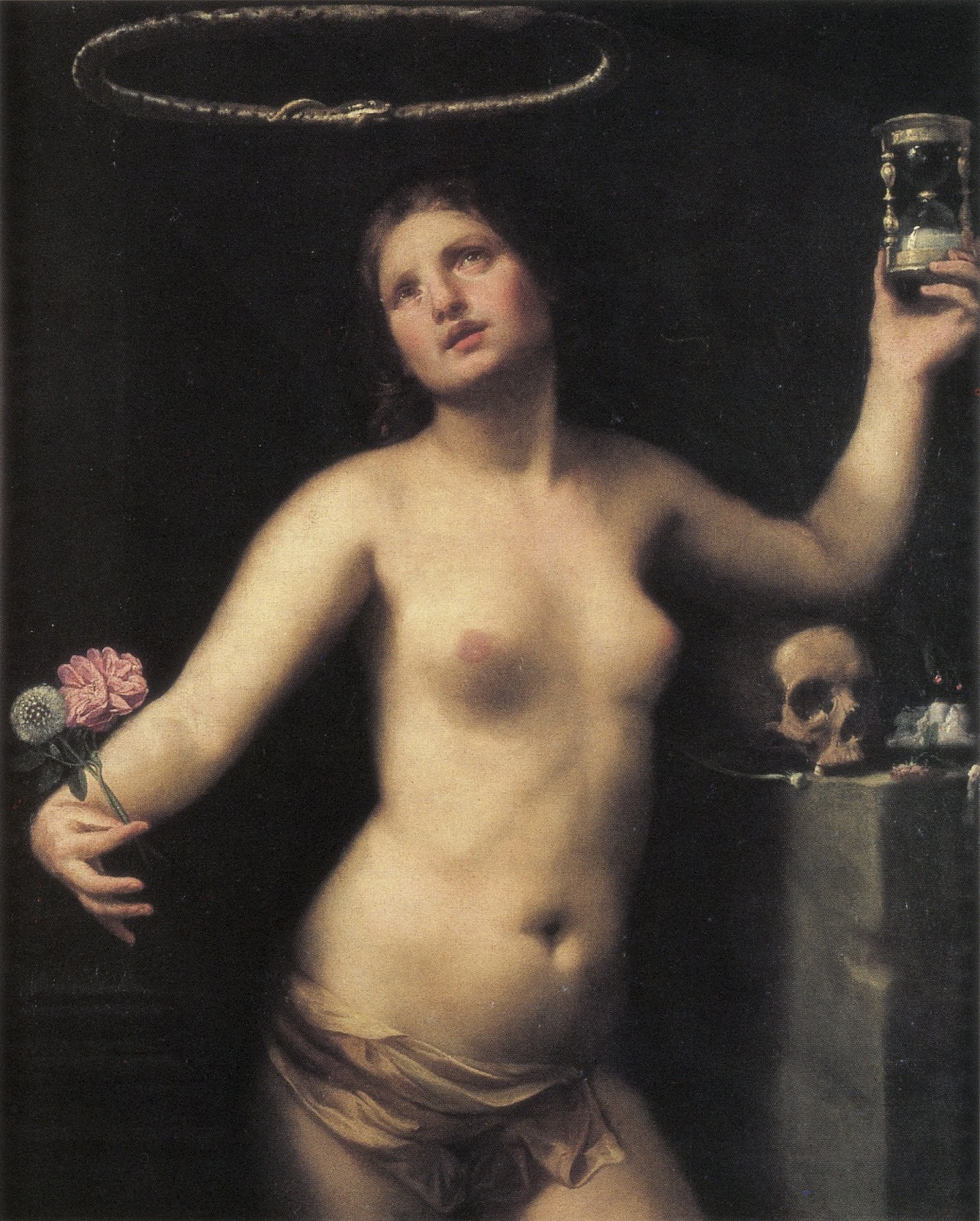
An allegorical classical woman c. 1670s, representing eternity (Note: She holds up an hourglass, her elbow above a human skull and in her lower hand two flowers in maturity, one of which is a dandelion blowball or clock (seed head), reminders of transience. An Ouroboros, snake swallowing its own tail, floats above her head as a halo - symbols of eternity.)

=== Folk art ===
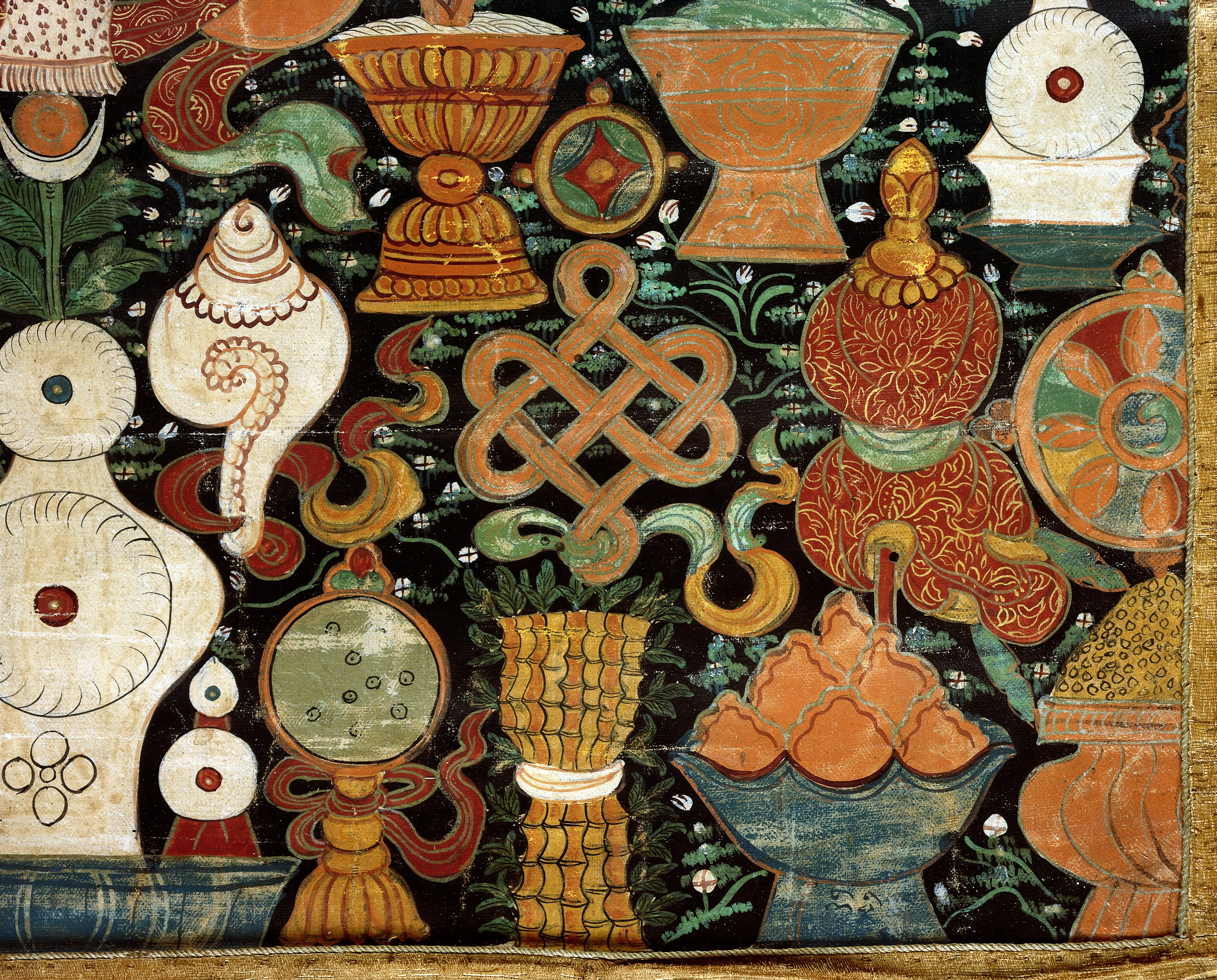
The "endless knot" in Tibetan Buddhism

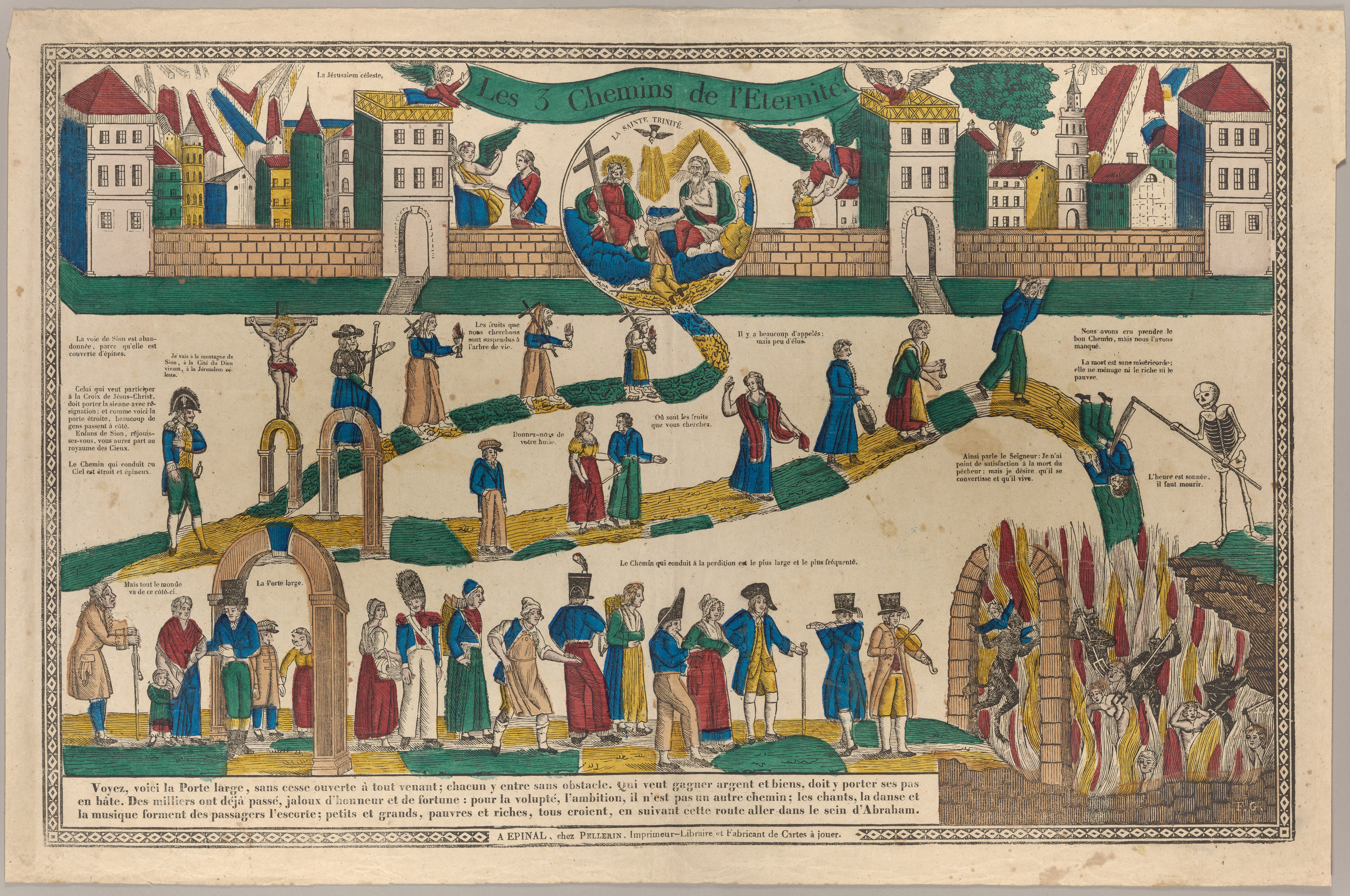
Folk art allegorical map "The 3 Roads to Eternity" from Matthew 7:13–14 by the woodcutter Georgin François (1801–1863) in 1825

=== Graphic art ===
Some of the works of MC Escher were explorations of the idea of eternity.

=== Symbolism ===
Eternity is often symbolized by the endless snake, swallowing its own tail, the ouroboros. The circle, band, or ring is also commonly used as a symbol for eternity, as is the mathematical symbol of infinity, $\infty$. Symbolically, these are reminders that eternity has no beginning or end.

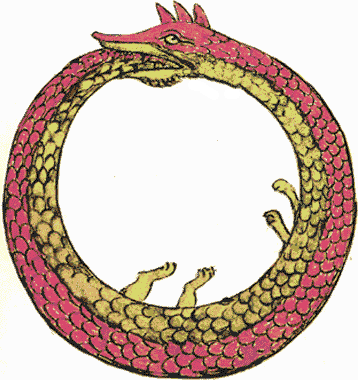
The ouroboros

Wallis

== See also ==
- Aion (deity)
- Aeon
- Akal (Sikh term)
- Eternal now
- Eternal return
- Everlasting life
- Eviternity
- Kalpa
- Time perception
- Temporal finitism
- Wheel of time
