= Young and Foolish (James Young album) =

Live album by James Young
- Released: 1967
- Recorded: 1967, At the Ulster Group Theatre
- Genre: Comedy
- Length: 54:36
- Label: Emerald Music
- Producer: Peter Lloyd

James Young chronology
Young at Heart (1966)	Young and Foolish (1967)	It's Great to be Young (1968)

Young and Foolish is the second comedy album released by Northern Irish comedian and actor James Young.

The album cover features a picture taken by Stanley Matchett. In the picture Young and his business partner Jack Hudson are standing on the back of an Ulster Transport Authority bus. Each man has a speech bubble coming from his mouth. Husdon's states "James Young in" with Young's replying "Young and Foolish". The back cover features a poem and sleeve notes written by John Knipe.

== Track listing ==
=== Side 1 ===
1. Meet James Young - 13:24
2. Surgery Hours - 6:19
3. The Stranger - 4:19
4. Jumper Room - 2:41

=== Side 2 ===
1. The Centre Forward - 4:00
2. Time For Love - 4:20
3. A Man's Best Friend - 3:17
4. The Presentation - 5:36
5. A Boy Looks At Life - 5:02
6. Salute to Belfast - 3:15

== Re-release ==
Emerald Music re-released the album in 1999 in a four-disc boxset to commemorate the 25th Anniversary of Young's death. The album was boxed with three of Young's other comedy albums (The Young Ulsterman, Very Much Live In Canada and Behind the Barricades). The album was marketed as James Young: Ireland's Greatest Comic Legend Volume 1.
