= The Very Best of James Young =

Compilation album by James Young
- Released: 2001
- Recorded: 1966–1973
- Genre: Comedy
- Length: 1:57:54
- Label: Emerald Music

James Young chronology
Forever Young (1988)	The Very Best of James Young (2001)

The Very Best of James Young is the twelfth comedy album released by Northern Irish comedian and actor James Young and the third to be released posthumously.

The album cover features a collage of pictures taken by Stanley Matchett for Young's previous albums The Young Ulsterman, Young at Heart, James Young Sings Ulster Party Pieces & Behind the Barricades.

The album is a compilation album featuring a mix of Young's sketches, serious monologues and comedy songs as well as material previously only available on his single releases.

Each volume of the album was made available separately or in a boxset with The Ballymena Cowboy.

== Track listing ==
=== Volume 1 ===
1. Smithfield Market, Belfast - 3:31
2. The Farmer Wants A Wife - 5:44
3. The Glentoran Supporter - 3:11
4. Big Aggie's Man - 3:05
5. The Letter - 6:36
6. Wee Davy - 5:00
7. I'm The Only Catholic (On The Linfield Team) - 2:42
8. A Boy Finds Out The Facts - 3:49
9. Behind The Barricades - 1:32
10. In The Year - 5:21
11. Gerry's Walls - 2:18
12. Me Da - 5:14
13. A Boy Looks At Life - 5:01
14. An American View Of Ulster - 5:48

=== Volume 2 ===
1. Meet James Young - 6:54
2. The Presentation - 5:35
3. God Bless The Working Man - 3:19
4. Living In Hope - 6:59
5. Orange Lily - 6:39
6. Mr Thompson Goes To Dublin - (With Kathleen Feenan) - 8:42
7. The Crabbed Oul Woman - 3:38
8. I Loved A Papish - 9:05
9. What's On Tonight - 4:50
10. Ulster's Space Man - 2:30
