= All the King's Horses =

All the King's Horses is an allusion to "All the king's horses and all the king's men / Couldn't put Humpty together again", from the nursery rhyme Humpty Dumpty.

It may also refer to:

== Films and television ==
- All the King's Horses (film), a 1935 American comedy musical film
- "All the King's Horses" (Upstairs, Downstairs), an episode of the British drama series Upstairs, Downstairs
- All the King's Horses (Zack Snyder's Justice League), part 5 of the movie Zack Snyder's Justice League

== Songs ==
- "All the King's Horses" (The Firm song)
- "All the King's Horses" (Lynn Anderson song), 1976
- "All the King's Horses", a song by Dusty Springfield from the 1969 album Dusty in Memphis
- "All the King's Horses (All the King's Men)", a song by Honey Cone from the 1971 album, Soulful Tapestry
- "All the King's Horses", a song by Aretha Franklin from the 1972 album Young, Gifted and Black
- "All the King's Horses", a song by Nazareth from the 1977 album Expect No Mercy
- "All the King's Horses", a song by The Nolans from the 1979 album The Nolan Sisters
- "All the King's Horses", a song by Petra from the 1987 album This Means War!
- "All the King's Horses", a song by The Monkees from the 1990 album Missing Links Volume Two
- "Fall from Grace", a song by Stevie Nicks from the 2001 album Trouble in Shangri-La
- "All the King's Horses", a song by Robert Plant and the Strange Sensation from the 2005 album Mighty ReArranger
- "All the King's Horses", a B-side to Blind Guardian's 2007 single "Another Stranger Me"
- "All the King's Horses", a soundtrack by Thomas Bergersen from the 2012 album SkyWorld

== Albums ==
- All the King's Horses (Grover Washington, Jr. album), 1972
- All the King's Horses (Lynn Anderson album), 1976
- All the King's Horses (The Legendary Pink Dots album), 2002

== Literature ==
- "All the King's Horses" (short story), a 1953 short story by Kurt Vonnegut
- All the King's Horses, a novel by Jeffrey A. Nesbit
- All the King's Horses, a 1930 novel by Margaret Widdemer
- All the King's Horses, a 1960 novel by Michèle Bernstein
- All the King's Horses (play), a 1961 comedy play by John McDonnell

== See also ==
- All the King's Men (disambiguation), for other articles based on the same verse
