= This Is the Way the World Ends =

"This is the way the world ends" is a quotation from the 1925 poem "The Hollow Men" by T. S. Eliot.

This Is the Way the World Ends may refer to:

- This Is the Way the World Ends (novel), a 1986 novel by James Morrow
- "This Is the Way the World Ends" (Dexter), a 2011 episode of Dexter
- This Is the Way the World Ends: How Droughts and Die-offs, Heat Waves and Hurricanes Are Converging on America, a 2018 nonfiction book by Jeff Nesbit

== See also ==
- This Is How the World Ends, an album by Badflower
