= Sounds Like a Melody =

Single by Alphaville

from the album Forever Young
- B-side: "The Nelson Highrise (Sector One: The Elevator)"
- Released: May 14, 1984
- Genre: Synth-pop
- Length: 4:45 (album version); 4:29 (7" single); 7:42 (12" maxi)
- Label: WEA
- Songwriter(s): Marian Gold; Bernhard Lloyd; Frank Mertens
- Producer(s): Orlando (Wolfgang Loos)

Alphaville singles chronology
"Big in Japan" (1984)	"Sounds Like a Melody" (1984)	"Forever Young" (1984)

Music video
- "Sounds Like a Melody" on YouTube

"Sounds Like a Melody" is a song by German synth-pop band Alphaville, released on May 14, 1984 as the second single from their debut album Forever Young.

The song was a big success in continental Europe and South Africa, reaching the top 10; it topped the charts in Italy and Sweden, and was certified gold in Germany.

== Song background ==
Originally, Alphaville had planned to release "Forever Young" as their second single, to follow the success of "Big in Japan". However, record studio executives requested that Alphaville release an additional song between the two singles, and as a result "Sounds Like a Melody" was written and arranged in just two days. Of the experience, singer Marian Gold said "the whole affair felt like an insult to our naive hippie instincts. Writing music exclusively for the sake of commercial success seemed like the sell-out of our virtual beliefs. On the other hand, did this not open up possibilities for wonderful games to play in the brave new world of pop music?" This corporate pressure caused the band to dislike the song and they refused to play it live for over 10 years.

== Track listings ==
7" single

1. "Sounds Like a Melody" – 4:29
2. "The Nelson Highrise Sector One: the Elevator" – 3:14

12" maxi

1. "Sounds Like a Melody" (special long version) – 7:42
2. "The Nelson Highrise Sector One: the Elevator" – 4:12

12" maxi Record Store Day 2020 yellow vinyl

1. "Sounds Like a Melody" (Grant & Kelly remix) - 8:33
2. "Sounds Like a Melody" (special long version remastered) - 7:43
- The 7" version differs greatly from the version released later on the album.
- The B-side is commonly referred to simply as "The Elevator", and a remix appears on 1999's Dreamscapes.

== Chart performance ==
=== Weekly charts ===
Chart (1984–1985)	Peak position
Austria (Ö3 Austria Top 40)	3
Belgium (Ultratop 50 Flanders)	10
France (SNEP)	10
Italy (FIMI)	1
Netherlands (Dutch Top 40)	6
Netherlands (Single Top 100)	8
Norway (VG-lista)	5
Quebec (ADISQ)	50
South Africa (Springbok Radio)	2
Spain (AFYVE)	5
Sweden (Sverigetopplistan)	1
Switzerland (Schweizer Hitparade)	4
West Germany (GfK)	3

=== Year-end charts ===
Chart (1984)	Position
Austria (Ö3 Austria Top 40)	19
Belgium (Ultratop 50 Flanders)	80
Netherlands (Dutch Top 40)	80
Netherlands (Single Top 100)	55
Switzerland (Schweizer Hitparade)	15

Chart (1985)	Position
France (SNEP)	53

== See also ==
- List of number-one hits of 1984 (Italy)
- List of number-one singles and albums in Sweden
