= James Young's 4th =

1969 comedy album by James Young

Live album by James Young
- Released: 1969
- Recorded: 1969, At the Ulster Group Theatre
- Genre: Comedy
- Length: 54:54
- Label: Emerald Music
- Producer: Peter Lloyd

James Young chronology
It's Great to Be Young (1968)	James Young's 4th (1969)	James Young Sings Ulster Party Pieces (1969)

James Young's 4th is the fourth comedy album released by Northern Irish comedian and actor James Young.

The album cover features a picture taken by Stanley Matchett of Young shaving. The back cover features sleeve notes by John Knipe.

== Track listing ==
=== Side 1 ===
1. Meet James Young – 11:38
2. The Farmer Wants A Wife – 5:47
3. Boys and Girls Come Out to Play – 4:40
4. The Builder – 5:33

=== Side 2 ===
1. Balmoral Ball – 5:40
2. The Letter – 5:55
3. Wee Davy – 5:10
4. The Waitress – 8:03
5. This is Us – 2:21

== Re-Release ==
Emerald Music re-released the album in 1999 in a four CD boxset to commemorate the 25th Anniversary of Young's death. The album was boxed with three of James Young's other comedy albums (Young at Heart, James Young Sings Ulster Party Pieces and It's Great to Be Young). The album was marketed as James Young: Ireland's Greatest Comic Legend Volume 2.
