= James Young Sings Ulster Party Pieces =

Studio album by James Young
- Released: 1969
- Genre: Comedy
- Length: 43:09
- Label: Emerald Music
- Producer: Peter Lloyd

James Young chronology
James Young's 4th (1969)	James Young Sings Ulster Party Pieces (1969)	Behind the Barricades (1970)

James Young Sings Ulster Party Pieces is the fifth comedy album released by Northern Irish comedian and actor James Young.

The album cover features a picture taken by Stanley Matchett of Young busking outside the Ulster Group Theatre. Amongst those Young is seen busking at his business partner Jack Hudson.

Unlike Young's previous albums which featured recordings of sketches from his live shows, this album was a studio recording featuring songs written by and for Young.

== Track listing ==
=== Side 1 ===
1. Clyde Valley - 3:34
2. Gerry's Walls - 5:07
3. Me Da - 5:14
4. Non Sectarian Football Team - 2:14
5. I'm the Only Catholice (On The Linfield Team) - 2:41
6. Changed Times - 2:47

=== Side 2 ===
1. We're All Ecumenical Now - 5:43
2. I Protest - 2:23
3. Civil Rioteers - 2:18
4. Jimmie, The Belfast Folk Singer - 4:13
5. The Wrong Fut - 3:23
6. Big Aggie's Man - 3:03

== Singles ==
- I Protest / I’m the only Catholic (on the Linfield Team)
- The Wrong Fut / The BBC Investigate
- Gerry's Walls / Smithfield Market, Belfast
- Remember 1960 / Me Da
- Clyde Valley

== Re-release ==
Emerald Music re-released the album in 1999 in a four-disc boxset to commemorate the 25th Anniversary of Young's death. The album was boxed with three of Young's other comedy albums (Young at Heart, James Young's 4th and It's Great to Be Young). The album was marketed as James Young: Ireland's Greatest Comic Legend Volume 2.
