= All the King's Men (disambiguation) =

All the King's Men is a 1946 novel by Robert Penn Warren.

All the King's Men may also refer to:

- All the King's Men, a line in the nursery rhyme Humpty Dumpty

== Film and television ==
- All the King's Men (1949 film), a 1949 film of the Warren book
- All the King's Men (1971 film), a 1971 film of the Warren book, produced in the USSR by Belarusian TV
- All the King's Men (1983 film), a 1983 Taiwanese film directed by King Hu
- All the King's Men (1999 film), a BBC feature-length drama on men from Sandringham in the First World War
- All the King's Men (2006 film), a 2006 film adaptation of the Warren novel starring Sean Penn, Jude Law, Kate Winslet, and Anthony Hopkins
- "All the King's Men" (Soldier Soldier), a 1991 television episode
- All the King's Men (Kraft Television Theatre), an American television play

== Music ==
- All the King's Men (The Legendary Pink Dots album), a 2002 album by The Legendary Pink Dots
- All the King's Men (Chvrches album), a 2027 album by Chvrches
- "All the King's Men", a song by Wild Beasts, from the album Two Dancers

== Other ==
- All the King's Men, children's opera by Richard Rodney Bennett
- All the King's Men (board game), a board game published by Parker Brothers in 1979

== See also ==
- All the President's Men, a 1974 non-fiction book by Carl Bernstein and Bob Woodward
- All the King's Horses (disambiguation)
- Willie Stark, a 1981 opera by Carlisle Floyd, based on Warren's novel
