= John McDonnell (playwright) =

Irish playwright and journalist

John McDonnell was an Irish playwright and journalist.

McDonnell worked as a television critic on The Sunday Press. As a playwright his work is most closely associated with the Ulster Group Theatre, Belfast, where he wrote a string of successful comedy plays in the 1960s and 1970s in association with the actor and comedian James Young.

== Life and career ==
J. N. McDonnell was born in Kilsaran, Co. Louth. McDonnell, and his wife Patti, lived in Dublin where he worked as a journalist and playwright.

In 1961 McDonnell wrote All the King's Horses, which was performed at the Abbey Theatre, Dublin. The story is a farcical one in which an eccentric Irish woman dies and leaves her fortune to her two nephews. One is a Southern Irish Republican and the other is a Northern Irish Orangeman. To inherit the fortune they must spend a month in the cottage in peace.

The play came to the attention of Belfast based actor James Young, who contacted the author with a view to performing the play at the Ulster Group Theatre. As had been his practice with his former writer Sam Cree, Young felt that the play would need reworked for a Belfast audience. Young was quoted as saying about McDonnell that he had "no arty airs about him and, being a journalist, set about the changes I suggested in a most realistic fashion". McDonnell's rewrites would remove some of the more serious aspects of the play and introduced a new character.

The play was a financial success and McDonnell and Young formed a creative partnership that would last until the time of Young's death in 1974. They formed a working relationship in which Young would develop an idea for a play and, after several phone calls, McDonnell would write the first draft on the script. McDonnell would send this draft to Young to rehearse the actors. Young would remove bits and add sequences to make the play as funny as possible, which McDonnell would then redraft. A standing joke between the two on the opening night of a play was that McDonnell would remark to Young "a lovely play, Jimmy. I'm so glad you used my title".

McDonnell and Young would jointly adapt two existing English plays, Friends and Neighbours and Love Locked Out, to a Northern Irish setting. McDonnell would go on to be credited as the sole writer of another nine plays that premiered at the Ulster Group Theatre. He would also serve as writer of various sketches in Young's one man shows and write Young's 1970s Television series Saturday Night.

Of all of McDonnell's plays, only the original version of All the King's Horses appears to have been published professionally. While his reworking of All the King's Horses for the Belfast production and a version of Silver Wedding, with the characters names and setting changed for a Dublin audience, exist in typescript form, originally available direct from the author. No versions of his other plays are currently known to exist as of January 2012.

== Playography ==
- All the King's Horses (1961)
- Friends and Neighbours (1962) – By Austin Steele, Adapted for a Northern Irish setting by John McDonnell & James Young
- Love Locked Out (1963) – By David Kirk, Adapted for a Northern Irish setting by John McDonnell & James Young
- An Apple a Day (1963)
- Wish You Were Here (1964)
- Silver Wedding (1964)
- Holiday Spirit (1965)
- Sticks and Stones (1965)
- Lucky Break (1966)
- The Wrong Fut (1966)
- Up the Long Ladder (1967)
- The Cat and the Fiddle (1971)

== Noel Marian ==
In the 1975 addition of McDonnell's play All the King's Horses he is credited as author of the plays Swan Song, Buckshot Biddy, Roadside and Wigs on the Green.

When these plays were first published they were credited to Noel Marian. However, the copyright notice and permission to perform the plays were still granted to McDonnell in the published scripts.

Marian wrote a series of five plays for the Kilsaran Players in the 1940s and 1950s.

=== Credits as playwright ===
- Swan Song (1945)
- Buckshot Biddy (1945)
- Roadside (1945)
- Wigs on the Green (1957)
- Wind from the West
