= It's Great to Be Young =

It's Great to Be Young may refer to:

- It's Great to Be Young (1946 film), an American musical comedy
- It's Great to Be Young (1956 film), a British musical comedy
- It's Great to Be Young (album), a 1968 comedy album by James Young
