= Timeless Love =

Timeless Love may refer to:

- "Timeless Love" (song), a 1967 song by Ed Ames, written by Buffy Sainte-Marie
- Timeless Love (album), a 2006 album by Smokey Robinson
- Timeless Love (film), a 2012 Singaporean romance drama film
