= Forever Young (War Child album) =

2026 charity album by various artists

Compilation album by various artists
- Released: 20 November 2026
- Label: War Child Records

War Child charity albums chronology
Help(2) (2026)	Forever Young (2026)

Singles from Forever Young
- 1. "Forever Young" Released: 30 September 2026; 2. "Wide Open Road" Released: 30 September 2026; 3. "Dance on Fire" Released: 23 October 2026; 4. "You Can Have It All" Released: 23 October 2026; 5. "Broken Toys" Released: 13 November 2026; 6. "Under the Milky Way" Released: 13 November 2026; 7. "Helplessly Hoping" Released: 20 November 2026

Forever Young is a charity album created by the Australian branch of the organisation War Child in order to raise funds for their work involving helping children living through war. It is the first Australian artist initiative for War Child's global cause and includes unreleased tracks, rare covers and original recordings. It is scheduled for release on 20 November 2026.

== Track listing ==
Forever Young track listing
No.	Title	Writer(s)	Length
1.	"Broken Toys" (Paul Kelly)	Paul Kelly	1:53
2.	"Under the Milky Way" (Missy Higgins)	Karin Jansson; Steve Kilbey	4:01
3.	"You Can Have it All" (Any Young Mechanic)	Harry Wayne Casey	3:40
4.	"Dance On Fire" (Sarah Blasko)	Sarah Blasko; Benjamin Fletcher; David Hunt	2:52
5.	"Ancient Monkey" (The Nagging Doubts)		2:31
6.	"(I'm) Stranded" (Loose Content)	Chris Bailey; Ed Kuepper	3:57
7.	"My Lagan Love" (Grace Cummings)		5:14
8.	"Wide Open Road" (The Temper Trap)	David McComb	3:42
9.	"Helplessly Hoping" (Ruel)	Stephen Stills	2:35
10.	"Stepped Reckoner" (Glenn Richards)		3:56
11.	"My Last Time (live)" (Milly Strange)		5:29
12.	"War Zone (live)" (William Crighton)	William Crighton	2:37
13.	"Make Me Feel Bad" (Dappled Cities)		3:50
14.	"Excerpt from 1924 Geneva Declaration of the Rights of the Child" (Thea Martin)		0:30
15.	"Forever Young (2026 flashback remix)" (Youth Group and Paul Mac)	Marian Gold; Bernhard Lloyd; Frank Mertens	5:44
