= Talk to the Hand (Dexter) =

- Dexter episode
- Episode no.: Season 6 Episode 11
- Directed by: Ernest Dickerson
- Written by: Manny Coto; Tim Schlattmann
- Cinematography by: Romeo Tirone
- Editing by: Keith Henderson
- Original release date: December 11, 2011
- Running time: 48 minutes

Guest appearances
- Colin Hanks as Travis Marshall (special guest star); Geoff Pierson as Thomas Matthews; Aimee Garcia as Jamie Batista; Billy Brown as Mike Anderson; Josh Cooke as Louis Greene; Kyle Davis as Steve Dorsey; Jordana Spiro as Beth Dorsey; Rya Kihlstedt as Dr. Michelle Ross

Episode chronology
← Previous "Ricochet Rabbit"	Next → "This Is the Way the World Ends"
- Dexter season 6

"Talk to the Hand" is the eleventh episode of the sixth season of the American crime drama television series Dexter. It is the 71st overall episode of the series and was written by executive producer Manny Coto and co-executive producer Tim Schlattmann, and directed by Ernest Dickerson. It originally aired on Showtime on December 11, 2011.

Set in Miami, the series centers on Dexter Morgan, a forensic technician specializing in bloodstain pattern analysis for the fictional Miami Metro Police Department, who leads a secret parallel life as a vigilante serial killer, hunting down murderers who have not been adequately punished by the justice system due to corruption or legal technicalities. In the episode, Dexter prevents a biochemical attack on Miami Metro on his pursuit of Travis, while Debra gets an upsetting revelation during a therapy session.

According to Nielsen Media Research, the episode was seen by an estimated 1.92 million household viewers and gained a 0.9 ratings share among adults aged 18–49. The episode received mixed reviews from critics, with Debra's subplot receiving negative reactions.

== Plot ==
Miami Metro has arrived at the yacht, finding Steve's body. During this, Angel (David Zayas) is held hostage at the Dorsey household, where Travis (Colin Hanks) instructs Beth (Jordana Spiro) to take the Wormwood poison to the Miami Metro headquarters and release it, using Angel's ID to gain access.

Quinn (Desmond Harrington) visits the Dorsey household, discovering Angel tied. As he saves him from a fire, Travis escapes. The squad returns to the precinct, where Beth awaits for Debra (Jennifer Carpenter) to arrive. Dexter investigates Steve's background, and discovers Beth is his wife. Before she can meet with Debra alone, Dexter throws Beth to a room just as she releases the poison. Beth dies, while Dexter survives with some side effects from the exposure. Due to the potential terrorism scale of the case, Homeland Security arrives to take over the Doomsday Killer case.

Dexter steals Gellar's hand from his corpse and uses it to mount a tableau at the museum, pretending to be Travis. This leads the team to conclude that Gellar is dead, while Dexter sends a message to Travis to warn him he will come for him. Debra meets with Matthews (Geoff Pierson), who confirms his involvement in the call girl's case. He states he was feeling alone, and tried to save her and fled to avoid a PR nightmare. He later shows up at her office angry when he is being forced into retirement, but Debra is confused as she did not tell anyone. During another therapy session, Dr. Ross (Rya Kihlstedt) talks with Debra over her feelings for Dexter. When she insinuates that Debra feels more for Dexter than just as a brother, Debra is offended by the suggestion and ends her sessions. Later, she has a dream where she and Dexter share a kiss.

Debra discovers that LaGuerta (Lauren Vélez) was responsible for Matthews' resignation. Debra is upset that she used her, but LaGuerta expresses no remorse over her actions. Dexter uses the message to lure Travis, signaling his boat's location, where he will ambush him. As Travis arrives, Dexter is unable to proceed as the side effects of the poison occur. Travis seizes the opportunity to sedate him and throw him on a life boat. He then lights the water with gas flames, forming his new tableau, the "Lake of Fire". Travis then leaves the scene, leaving Dexter on an exploding boat. Unbeknownst to him, Dexter has escaped from the boat just before the explosion.

== Production ==
=== Development ===
The episode was written by executive producer Manny Coto and co-executive producer Tim Schlattmann, and directed by Ernest Dickerson. This was Coto's fifth writing credit, Schlattmann's 12th writing credit, and Dickerson's sixth directing credit.

== Reception ==
=== Viewers ===
In its original American broadcast, "Talk to the Hand" was seen by an estimated 1.92 million household viewers with a 0.9 in the 18–49 demographics. This means that 0.9 percent of all households with televisions watched the episode. This was a slight increase in viewership from the previous episode, which was watched by an estimated 1.87 million household viewers with a 0.9 in the 18–49 demographics.

=== Critical reviews ===
"Talk to the Hand" received mixed reviews. Matt Fowler of IGN gave the episode a "good" 7.5 out of 10, and wrote, "I'm pretty sure that this was not the therapeutic epiphany we wanted Deb to have. And while "Talk To The Hand" was a better Dexter episode than the past couple that we've gotten, it was still littered with a few dumb moments and an icky sub-plot involving Deb having dreams of making out with Dex."

Joshua Alston of The A.V. Club gave the episode a "D" grade and wrote, "There were flashes of promise in the third, fourth, and even fifth seasons, but Dexter has never really gotten its mojo back. And “Talk To The Hand” is the lowest point of a terrible season." Richard Rys of Vulture wrote, "With no more tableaus to complete and an apocalypse to launch, Travis might need new interns. Louis's game plan has only just begun. And there was something else, too... oh, right, and Deb might want to bang her brother."

Chase Gamradt of BuddyTV wrote, "Not a bad episode, but once again it was only 45 minutes long. C'mon, Showtime! When we're told a show is an hour long, we expect a full hour." Ian Grey of Salon wrote, "Travis lights the gas and it blows up real good - a Lake of Fire! (Well, an ocean if you want to be technical.) Of course, this is Dexter, so blowing him up only means blowing him out of harm's way to ponder, before the credits roll, “How did I get so lost?” Dude, let us count the ways."

Billy Grifter of Den of Geek wrote, "Dexter works much better when things start moving at a brisk pace, and after a few slow stories the narrative certainly shifted up a gear or two this week, as we approach the end of the season." Matt Richenthal of TV Fanatic gave the episode a 3 star rating out of 5 and wrote, "Sadly, the writers almost seem to be writing this season off before it's over. They appear to be setting storylines up for next year, whether it's Deb's strange new feelings for her brother, LaGuerta serving as Deputy Chief or Louis being lined up as a taunting new serial killer. Those might have potential, but it would be nice if they focused on making this season remotely interesting first, wouldn't it?"

Claire Zulkey of Los Angeles Times wrote, "despite all these issues, I found the episode more interesting and tense than last week's, possibly because it rang real-life alarm bells." Television Without Pity gave the episode a "C+" grade.
