= All the King's Horses (play) =

- Written by: John McDonnell
- Original language: English
- Genre: Comedy

Premiere
- Date premiered: 20 March 1961
- Place premiered: Abbey Theatre, Dublin

All the King's Horses is a play written by Irish-born journalist and playwright John McDonnell in 1961.

The play takes its title from the nursery rhyme Humpty Dumpty.

The plot concerns an elderly Irish woman, Kate Houlihan, who dies and leaves her fortune equally between her two nephews Michael and William. Michael is a Southern Irish Republican and William is a Northern Irish Orangeman. To inherit the fortune Michael and William must spend a month in peace in Kate's cottage. The two men find they are unable to live in peace so Kate's solicitor, Mr Applebloom, decides to partition the cottage. Much of the humour is derived from the two men trying to at first compete and then co-operate in the situation. For example, a radio is on one side of the cottage but the electrical socket is on the other.

The play was first produced at the Abbey Theatre on 20 March 1961. The play came to the attention of Northern Irish actor and comedian James Young who decided to run it at the Ulster Group Theatre, Belfast. McDonnell rewrote the play for Young, including the addition of a new character, an Englishman who did not understand Irish politics. The rewritten version was first produced at the Group Theatre on 24 October 1961.

The Abbey Theatre version of the play was published by James Duffy & Co. Ltd. in 1975, while a typescript of the Group Theatre version was also available from the author and has been revived over the years by a number of amateur dramatics groups.

== Plot ==
=== Act I ===
==== Scene one ====
Kate Houlihan, a frail aged woman, lives in a cottage somewhere in the south of Ireland and is looked after by her housekeeper Julia Finegan. Kate is convinced she is dying and reminisces about her family. She has two cousins, Michael Maloney from Kildare and William "Willie" MacStay is from Sandy Row in Belfast. Kate has sent for her cousins in the hope of seeing them before she dies. Kate's solicitor, Charles Applebloom, has traced William's whereabouts. Kate intends to include both cousins in her Will and heal the breach between her cousins. Michael arrives at the cottage and is reluctant to the situation. Soon Willie arrives and admits that he did not want to come at first, but Applebloom's telegram told him that it might be to his advantage. Michael and Willie engage in a point scoring exchange by insulting each other's country and politics. The exchange takes a lot out of Kate and she goes to her bedroom, aided by Julia and Michael, to rest. Applebloom confides in Willie that he is worried that if Kate includes him in her will it will result in violence. Willie assures Applebloom that he is confident that Kate will not leave him anything saying that he knows "how the Roman Catholic Church operates up here." Applebloom says that this is not the case, at which point Father Kelly arrives.

==== Scene two ====
It is several months later and Kate has died. Michael, Willie and Julia are in mourning at the cottage and Julia is preparing to pack Kate's possessions away. Mr Applebloom arrives and explains the provisions of Kate's will. Kate leaves a small amount to Julia with the remainder of her money and property to be divided equally between her two cousins. However, the men will not get their share unless they live peacefully in the cottage for one month. If one of the men fails then his share will go to the other and if both fail the money will be given to charity. Julia will also get a further inheritance if she acts as housekeeper for both men during this period, if she does not attend both the men this additional share will be donated to Willie's Orange Lodge. Mr Applebloom leaves to allow the others time to consider the proposal. Willie states that a picture of Éamon de Valera will have to be removed from the wall as he considers it provoking. The two men start to struggle, at which point Mr Applebloom returns. Michael explains the situation to Mr Applebloom who realises that the only way to stop the fighting from taking place is to keep both men apart. Mr Applebloom draws a line down the middle of the room, in effect partitioning the cottage. Michael must stay on one side and Willie the other. This appears to solve the situation. However, when Michael requests Willie hand over the picture of De Valera, Willie states that it belongs in his half of the cottage and he doesn't want Michael to have it and hangs it up again facing the wall. Julia prepares to make tea for Michael but, as the cutlery and table cloth are on Michael's side of the room she only lays out the things in his side of the table. When she goes to the dresser to get cups, however, Willie tells her that it is in his side of the room and she must not transport them across the border. Julia leaves to get Kate's good cups from storage. Michael turns on the radio, which is announcing the news. Willie becomes interested as the results of the Northern Irish football teams' matches are announced. Michael lets Willie hear the results up to the point when his favourite team, Linfield, is being announced, turning off the radio when their opponent's scores are about to be read. In retaliation, Willie switches off the lights to the room just as Julia returns with the cups, causing her to trip and shatter them.

=== Act II ===
It is the following evening. Willie has brought tools into the cottage and plans to build himself a fireplace, when Julia rushes in to stop him, thinking he plans to murder Michael. Michael tells Julia to let Willie go ahead as he has sent for Applebloom. Michael and Julia are outraged when Willie says that he has a woman solicitor assuming that he means she is a prostitute. Gerry O'Neill, a Northern Irish journalist arrives. Julia thinks he is one of the B Specials and goes to fetch her brother, while Willie assumes that he is a fellow loyalist. Gerry reveals that he is a Nationalist and thinks of all Ireland as his home. He intends to write a story concerning the situation in the cottage. Applebloom arrives, angered at continually having to mediate between Michael and Willie. Gerry leaves and Applebloom cautions the men to live in peace or they will not inherit their share of the fortune. Willie tells him about his own solicitor and Michael storms out of the cottage to go to the pub. Willie's solicitor, Mary MacMillan, arrives. She sees the problem of Michael and Willie as a simple one; Michael wants De Valera's picture and Willie wants an access to the facilities in Michael's half of the cottage. She proposes a solution that she calls an “international trade agreement”. Willie agrees to Mary's proposal and goes to fetch Michael. Gerry returns and decides to wait for Michael. He states that while he considers himself a nationalist he approves of the real Irish border as without it there "wouldn't be a spark of national spirit left in the country." Julia informs Mary that Michael and Willie are brawling in the pub. She says that the fight was started when Willie came into the pub and told Michael that a woman solicitor was looking for him. Mr Applebloom is pleased about the fight as he believes it will disqualify both from their inheritance. Mary informs him, however, that he men only had to live peacefully inside the cottage and not outside. Michael returns badly beaten and bandaged, followed by Willie who is even more badly beaten. The local Garda Síochána officer, Sergeant Reilly arrives. Reilly states that he wants to keep the peace without too much trouble. Mary assures him there will be no trouble between the men and tells him about the "trade agreement" she has proposed. Reilly is keen to see the agreement go ahead and convinces everyone to discuss the matter civilly. Mary convinces Willie to give De Valera's picture to Michael and in return Michael agrees to let Willie use the facilities in his half of the cottage. Applebloom warns the two that if there is any more trouble they will not get any of Kate's money and he too departs. Julia leaves to get some food to make the men their dinner. Gerry is angry at the situation and thinks that Willie should be under arrest for attempted murder. Mary, Michael and Willie try to calm him down but he only gets angrier. Gerry is enraged that Michael is not standing up more to Willie while Willie defends Michael against Gerry's attempts to provoke him. During the course of their arguments Willie and Michael involuntarily cross into the other territory. Gerry laughs at the men and leaves, followed by Mary. Michael and Willie realise where they are standing and awkwardly move back into their own half of the cottage. Michael turns the radio on and the two men sit in silence listening to Home! Sweet Home!.

=== Act III ===
==== Scene one ====
It is two weeks later, De Valera's picture hangs on Michael's side of the cottage and a picture of The Queen hangs in Willie's half. Michael and Willie are more comfortable going into the other's territory and Julia is more pleasant to Willie. Willie says that he can't understand why Julia did not get married and that the men "up here are daft." Julia coyly says to Willie that she was waiting for the right man to come along. Father Kelly arrives at the cottage. At first Julia and Willie assume that Father Kelly wants to convert Willie to Catholicism. But Father Kelly explains that he came to discuss a Tidy Towns competition. Julia is enraged at this and leaves. Michael enters and Father Kelly puts the idea of painting the cottage to him, stating that Kate once had the cottage painted a shade of pale green. Michael likes the idea but states he does not like pale colours and suggests a strong shade of green. Willie suggests that a pale red would be a much better colour. Father Kelly tries to calm the men as each increasingly argues for his preferred colour eventually telling the men to forget it and leaving. Mary arrives and suggests that they paint the cottage white. The two men agree and Michael leaves to buy paint. Mary tells Willie that when the men leave the cottage she would like to buy it. Willie agrees but Mary states that it is not that simple as that as Willie can only sell half the property and that Michael must agree to sell the other half. Gerry arrives and tells Willie that he has seen Michael heading to buy green paint. Willie then runs out to stop Michael. Gerry admits that it was a trick so that he could be alone with her. He apologises for kissing her the previous evening. The two blame it on romantic music and alcohol. They agree to meet that evening to discuss their feelings. Mr Applebloom informs Michael that he has received an offer for the cottage, however, the buyer does not want to be identified. Willie refuses to give Mr Applebloom his authority to sell the cottage as he does not want to go back on his word and refuses to tell Mr Applebloom who his buyer is. Michael is angered and refuses to go back on his word to sell to Mr Applebloom's client. The two refuse to compromise and Mr Applebloom loses his temper with the situation.

==== Scene two ====
It is two weeks later. Applebloom tells Julia that he has heard rumours that she secretly has some regard for Willie. Applebloom is disappointed that Michael and Willie can't reach an agreement to sell the house. Michael is adamant that he will only sell to Applebloom's client and wonders if there is a way to force Willie to sell. Michael wants to have a farewell drink with Gerry and asks Applebloom to join them. Applebloom assumes that Michael knew that it was his birthday but cannot join him as he wants to talk to Willie. Michael agrees to drink his health anyway and leaves. Julia returns with Willie and continues to defend him, but he is oblivious to her true intentions. Julia is angered by this and leaves. Applebloom starts to act drunk, due to it his having had a birthday drink, and he tells Willie that love is more important than politics. The two share a drink and Willie admits to having met and falling love with a woman called Martha who died weeks before they were due to be married. He admits that sometimes he can find no sense in squabbling and fighting. Mr Applebloom asks Willie if he will shake Michael's hand before he goes. Willie states he will shake Michael's hand and "ask King Billy to look the other road." Mary arrives and Applebloom worries that he will be remembered in the same league as David Lloyd George for having divided the cottage. A taxi arrives to take Michael to the train station. Applebloom convinces the cousins to shake hands before they depart. Each man admits that they are opposed to what the other stands for but that both points of view are equally important. Michael and Willie then depart in the same taxi for the station. Applebloom complains that the cottage was meant to bring the men together, but instead they have split it in half. Gerry tells Mary that when Applebloom drew the line on the floor he didn't think it would be so hard to rub it out again. Gerry says "I believe there's some difficulty in getting Humpty Dumpty together again." Mary tells Gerry that she has been trying to buy the cottage but because of the situation she is only able to buy half. Gerry reveals that he is Applebloom's secret buyer and together he and Mary would be able to buy the cottage and get married. Applebloom staggers in and overhears the conversation and joyfully starts to sing A Nation Once Again. Michael returns and states that he has missed his train and that the next one isn't until the following day. With the others Michael raises a glass of whiskey and agrees to "drink to Willie MacStay my cousin. NOT to Willie MacStay the Orangeman." At that moment Willie arrives and states that he has missed his train because the I.R.A. has blown up the train line. Michael and Willie start to argue and again the situation descends into a brawl. At first Mary and Applebloom try to calm the situation, but Gerry takes Mary out to the town to buy her an engagement ring. Gerry states that the two men "have as much right to be happy as we have." The two continue to argue as Applebloom begs them to stop.

== Group Theatre differences ==
When the play was transferred from Dublin to Belfast, star James Young suggested a number of changes to the author. The plot and most of the dialogue remained the same, but a number of minor changes to the script altered the tone to focus more on the comedy of the situation. Young also suggested the introduction of an English character that knew nothing about Irish politics. This character was Reginald "Reggie" Jones-Jackson, a stereotypical upper class Englishman; very polite and obliging and also dim-witted.

The first major change occurs during Act I Scene two just after the cottage has been partitioned and Julia has returned. At this point Reggie enters. His car has broken down and he wants to sit and wait until a mechanic arrives. While Reggie is waiting that Julia offers to make him tea. The scene plays out largely as in the original version, except both Willie and Michael share their own political views with Reggie, who amiably agrees to everything despite finding the situation in the cottage unbelievable.

Reggie returns in Act II, just after the departure of Sergeant Reilly. He arrives with a parcel of new china to thank the men for letting him wait for the mechanic. The scene plays out as before except Reggie continually moves the parcel around the room to avoid it shattering as the men argue and bang the table. When Gerry leaves, Reggie tries to congratulate Michael and Willie for their handling of the situation. In doing so he congratulates the men for being British, causing Michael to become angry and he and Willie chase Reggie from the cottage. The Act then ends the same as the original version.

In Act III Scene one Reggie appears when Michael and Willie argue over whom to sell the cottage to. He apologises for causing a disruption on his previous visit and says he came to see Mr Applebloom. He states his desire to buy the cottage as a holiday home for his family. Mr Applebloom and Willie consider it a solution to the problem but Michael does not want to sell to an Englishman. The scene ends with the same deadlock between Michael and Willie.

The final scene is played out in the same way as the original version, except that Willie's story about Martha is omitted. Reggie enters at the point after Michael and Willie have left for the station. Michael returns and the scene plays out as before, with Reggie occasionally interjecting into the conversation and also attempting to aid Mr Applebloom in stopping Michael and Willie fighting with each other as the play ends.

== Original casts ==
=== Abbey Theatre ===
- Kate Houlihan – Eileen Crowe
- Michael Maloney – Geoff Golden (As Seathrún Ó Góilí)
- William MacStay – Vincent Dowling (As Uinsionn Ó Dubhlainn)
- Charles Applebloom – Harry Brogan
- Julia Finegan – Brid Lynch (As Bríd Ní Loingsigh)
- Mary MacMillan – Máire Ní Dhomhnaill
- Gerry O'Neill – T.P. McKenna (As Tomás P. Mac Cionaith)
- Father James Kelly – Peadar Lamb (As Peadar Ó Luain)
- Sergeant Reilly – Mícheal Ó Briain
- Taxi Driver – Eoin Ó Súilleabháin
- Radio Voice – Bill Foley (As Liam ÓFoghlú)

=== Group Theatre ===
- Kate Houlihan – Lucy Young
- Michael Maloney – Hugh Swandel
- William MacStay – James Young
- Charles Applebloom – John McDarby
- Julia Finegan – Una McCourt
- Mary MacMillan – Melda Davey
- Gerry O'Neill – Maurice Taylor
- Father James Kelly – Patrick Coyle
- Sergeant Reilly – John F. Tyrone
- Reginald Jones-Jackson – Jack Hudson

== Television adaption ==
The play was adapted for television and was broadcast on RTÉ on 4 October 1964. Reaction to the television adaption was mixed. Some viewers felt that the adaption provided "good clean fun for all the family" while others felt that the production was a "diabolical production".

=== Cast ===
- Michael Maloney – John Cowley
- William MacStay – Hal Roach
- Mr Applebloom – Eddie Golden
- Julia Finegan – Marie Conmee
- Garry O'Neill – Mike Murphy
- Mary MacMillan – Lelia Doolan
- Kate Houlihan – Unknown
- Father James Kelly – Unknown
- Sergeant Reilly – Unknown
