= Atlantic Popes =

German synth-pop band

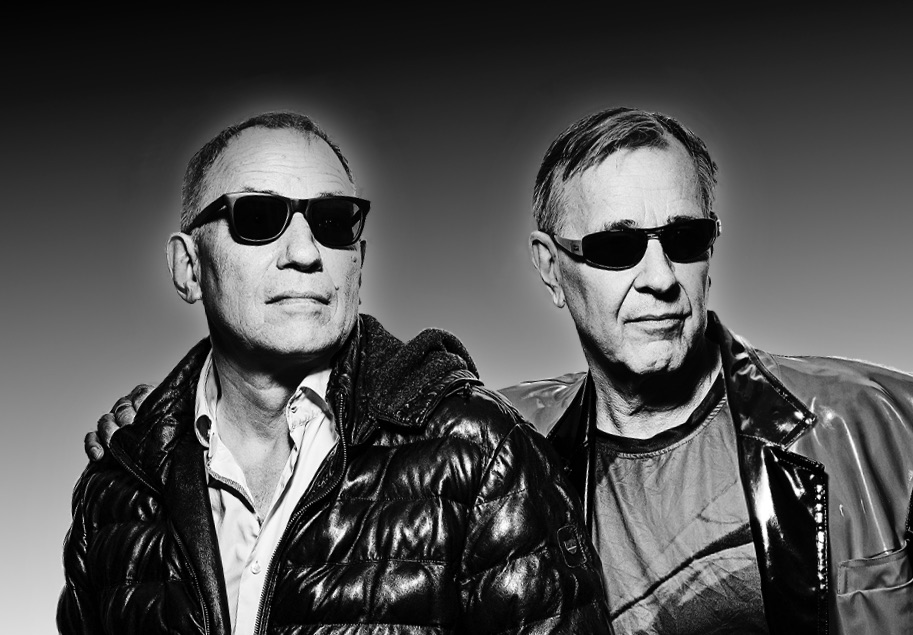
- Band photo Atlantic Popes (photo session autumn 2020)

Background information
- Origin: Berlin / Düsseldorf, Germany
- Genres: Synth-pop, electrowave, new wave
- Years active: 1989–present
- Members: Max Holler; Bernhard Lloyd
- Website: atlanticpopes.com

Atlantic Popes are a virtual music project by Bernhard Lloyd, co-founder and long-time member of the German synth-pop band Alphaville, and singer Max Holler.

The duo produces electropop with a big variety of styles and soundscapes.

In relation to the band's name, "Atlantic" refers to the southwest of France, where the duo wrote most of the songs on their first album. "Popes" is meant jokingly. According to Lloyd, both musicians liked the idea that everyone is a Pope and that "Popes" has the word "pop" in it.

== History ==
Holler and Lloyd met for the first time in Berlin in 1989. Holler was looking for a producer for his project "Echo Romeo" and Lloyd was somehow in the mood for adventure and a new musical challenge. He liked Holler's voice and singing as well as his songs.

After joining forces, they took some time off to work on the project on the southwest coast of France. After the creation phase in France, the first album was recorded at the LunaPark Studio in Berlin and later finished in Lloyd's home studio. At the end of the 1990s, they then gave their music project its name, Atlantic Popes. The first album entitled Atlantic Popes was released on 4 January 2001 and contains 14 songs, including "Love" and "Ice", also in a French version. Marian Gold, the singer of Alphaville, contributed backing vocals on the song "Games". For each song on the album, the band produced short comic animation videos.

In 2001, Atlantic Popes were invited to participate on the tribute album True Faith: A Tribute to New Order. Since they could choose the song, the band produced a cover of "Ceremony", a song released shortly after Ian Curtis' death and which Bernhard Lloyd particularly likes.

This was followed by an almost 20-year break from publishing, during which the duo remained in friendly and creative contact without interruption. Many demo versions of songs were written during this time.

In May 2020, the duo returned with the song "Hold On".

Since then, the duo have been releasing new songs at regular intervals and have been active on various social media channels. Their second album is currently in the works.

In 2021, Dream Image covered the Atlantic Popes song "Clouds and Years".

== Band members ==
Fotosession Atlantic Popes 2020

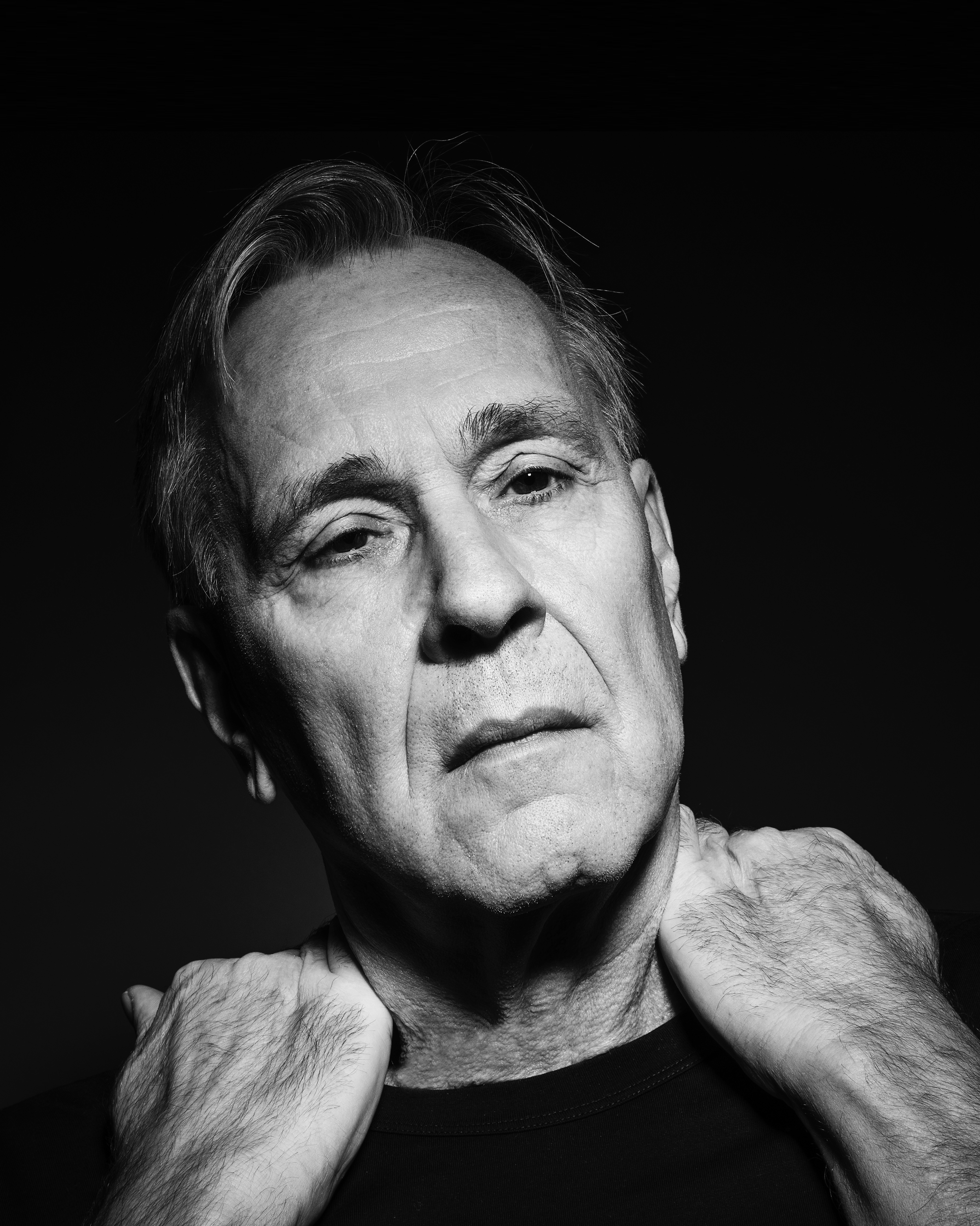
Max Holler (vocals)

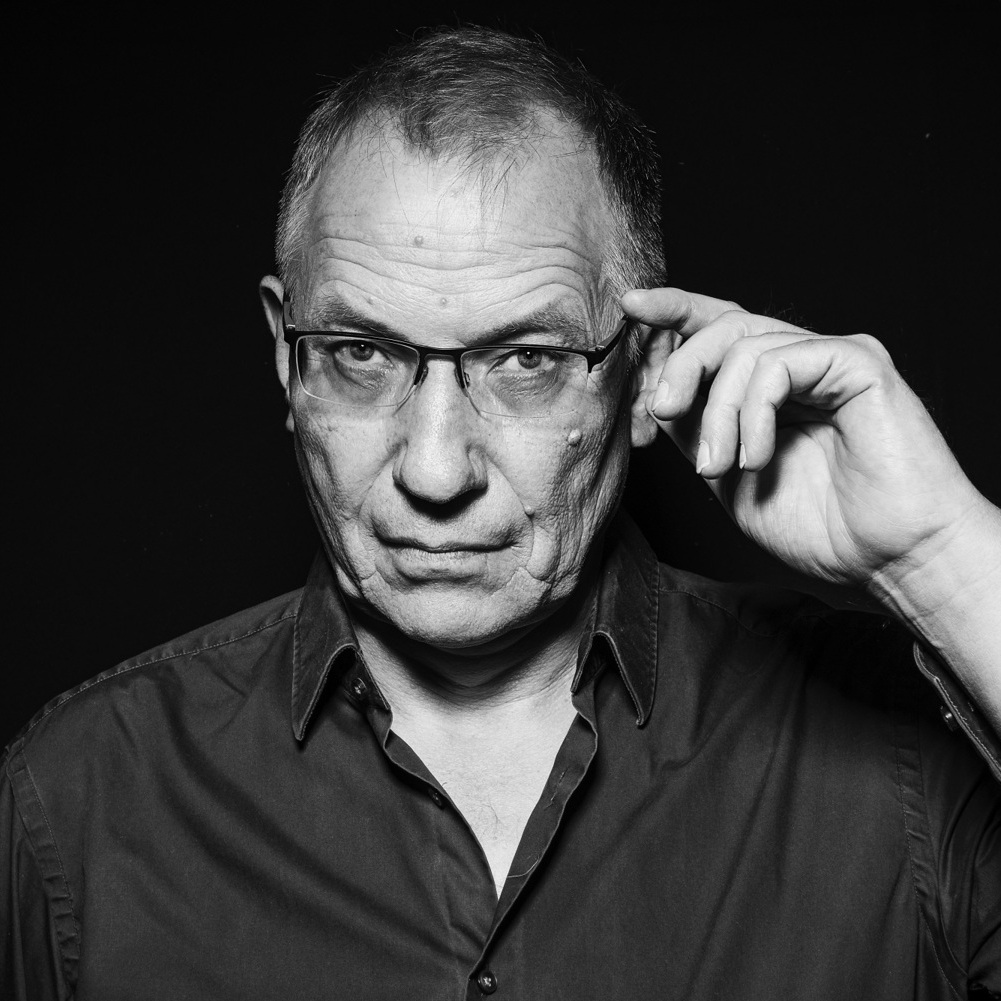
Bernhard Lloyd (keyboards)

== Discography ==
=== Albums ===
- 2001: Atlantic Popes

=== Singles ===
- 2020: "Hold On"
- 2020: "Tres" (three versions; the Padre mix, Figlio mix and Spirito mix)
- 2020: "Morningson"
- 2020: "Tres" (Rhauder's Enclaved Acid mix)
- 2020: "Bars of Sevilla"
- 2020: "The Happy Waiter"
- 2021: "Man in the Moon"
- 2021: "Clouds and Years"
- 2021: "Tres" (Pascale Voltaire remix)
- 2022: "Wide Eyed"
- 2022: "In the Arts" (shortcut and complete version)
- 2022: "Little 15" (Depeche Mode cover, part of the tribute album #6122 in honor of Andy Fletcher)

=== Compilation appearances ===
- 2001: "Ceremony" – True Faith: A Tribute to New Order
- 2022: "Little 15" – #6122: A Tribute Album to Andy Fletcher of Depeche Mode

== Awards and nominations ==
- The music video of the single "Hold On", produced by Holler himself, won the Best Music Video Award at the Buddha Picasso Einstein Film Festival in September 2020. The video also received the predicate "official selection" at the Gold Movie Awards UK 2021.
