= Young at Heart (James Young album) =

Live album by James Young
- Released: 1966
- Recorded: 1966, At the Ulster Group Theatre
- Genre: Comedy
- Length: 54:51
- Label: Emerald Music
- Producer: Peter Lloyd

James Young chronology
Young at Heart (1966)	Young and Foolish (1967)

Young at Heart is the first comedy album released by Northern Irish comedian and actor James Young.

The album cover features a picture taken by Stanley Matchett of Young painting a ship at the Harland and Wolff shipyard in Belfast. The back cover features sleeve notes and a poem written for Young by John Knipe.

The original album release credited the writing of material to Young, however the material was written by Young's regular sketch writers Knipe and John McDonnell.

== Track listing ==
=== Side 1 ===
1. Meet James Young - 9:24
2. TV Commercial - 11:53
3. The Year 2001 - 5:23

=== Side 2 ===
1. I Loved a Papish - 9:08
2. A Boy Finds Out The Facts - 3:49
3. Slum Clearance - 4:02
4. On the Hunt - 7:54
5. Why I am Here - 3:15

== Re-release ==
Emerald Music re-released the album in 1999 in a four-disc boxset to commemorate the 25th anniversary of Young's death. The album was boxed with three of Young's other comedy albums (It's Great to Be Young, James Young Sings Ulster Party Pieces and James Young's 4th). The album was marketed as James Young: Ireland's Greatest Comic Legend Volume 2.
