= Behind the Barricades =

Studio album by James Young
- Released: 1970
- Recorded: 1970
- Genre: Comedy
- Length: 32:28
- Label: Emerald Music
- Producer: Peter Lloyd

James Young chronology
James Young Sings Ulster Party Pieces (1969)	Behind the Barricades (1970)	The Ballymena Cowboy (1970)

Behind the Barricades is the sixth comedy album released by Northern Irish comedian and actor James Young.

The album cover features a picture taken by Stanley Matchett. On the cover a Soldier with his back to the camera stands in a street off the Falls Road, Belfast in front of a barricade. Behind the barricade Young, in drag, leans across to the soldier. The back cover features a photograph taken from the reverse angle.

Young continues the trend of comic songs and serious monologues set by his previous album rather than the live sketches of his first four albums.

== Track listing ==
=== Side 1 ===
1. Behind The Barricades: 1:32
2. The Latest News - 2:17
3. I'm A Belfast Beauty - 2:35
4. Ireland In The Sun - 3:09
5. The Ugliest Woman In Ireland - 3:36
6. Why Some People Go To Church - 1:53

=== Side 2 ===
1. Holidays in Bangor - 3:06
2. The Glentoran Supporter - 3:11
3. A Belfast Chambermaid - 2:05
4. The Gas Meter Man - 1:31
5. We Emigrated - 4:03
6. I Eat All I Can - 3:11

== Singles ==
- Behind the Barricades / Ulster's Space Man

== Re-release ==
Emerald Music re-released the album in 1999 in a four-disc boxset to commemorate the 25th Anniversary of Young's death. The album was boxed with three of Young's other comedy albums (The Young Ulsterman, Very Much Live In Canada and Young and Foolish). The album was marketed as James Young: Ireland's Greatest Comic Legend Volume 1.
