= Undressd =

Swedish musical duo

UNDRESSD
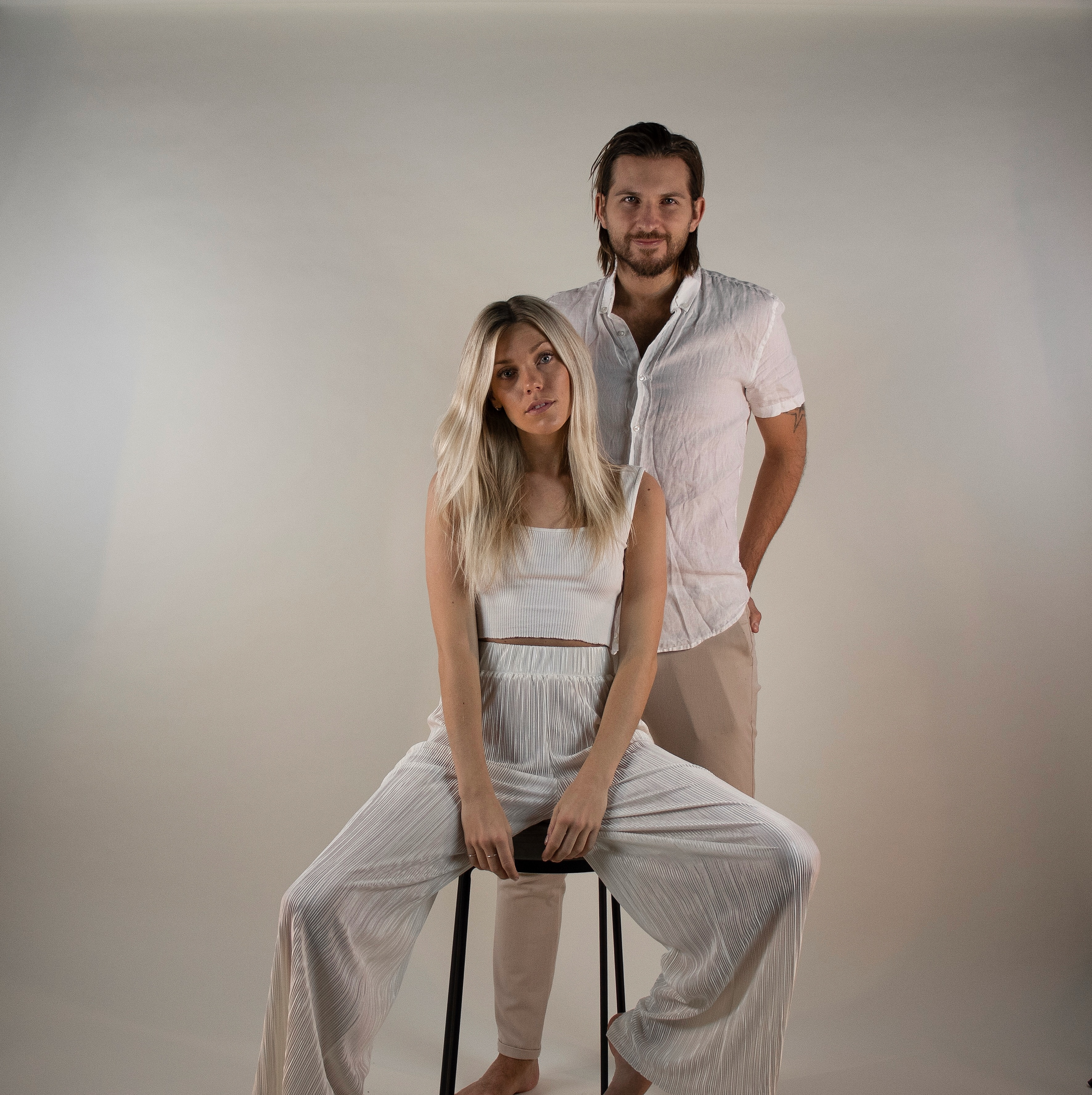
- UNDRESSD

Background information
- Origin: Sweden
- Genres: Pop
- Years active: 2018–present
- Labels: RadioAddict
- Members: Erik Pettersson

Undressd (styled as UNDRESSD) is a Swedish musical project by the producer Erik Pettersson. His cover of Alphaville's "Forever Young" peaked at No. 40 on the official Swedish singles chart.

Undressd was formed in 2018 by producer Erik Pettersson (co-founder, label owner and manager of RadioAddict) with an ambition to bring the old times back to life. The first single "Forever Young" (originally by Alphaville) were released in May 2019, which peaked at No. 40 on the Sverigetopplistan. It remained in the top 100 for a total of fifteen weeks. In May 2020, he released a second single, "Girls Just Wanna Have Fun" (originally by Cyndi Lauper). He also release Swedish songs under the stage name, Under.

== Discography ==
| Year | Title | Peak chart positions (Sverigetopplistan) | Certifications (sales thresholds) |
|---|---|---|---|
| 2019 | "Forever Young" | 40 | Platinum |
| 2020 | "Girls Just Wanna Have Fun" | — | — |
"—" denotes single that did not chart or was not released in that country
