= The Young Ulsterman =

Live album by James Young
- Released: 1973
- Recorded: 1973, At the Ulster Group Theatre
- Genre: Comedy
- Length: 1:00:35
- Label: Emerald Music
- Producer: Peter Lloyd

James Young chronology
Very Much Live In Canada (1971)	The Young Ulsterman (1973)	James Young (1975)

The Young Ulsterman is the ninth comedy album released by Northern Irish comedian and actor James Young. It was Young's final album to be released before his death in 1975. However, further albums would be released posthumously.

With his return to a mixture of sketches and serious monologues in his previous album, Young again followed that format with his ninth album. Unlike any of his previous albums, however, Young was joined by a cast of supporting players.

== Track listing ==
=== Side 1 ===
1. Me Mammy - (With Jean Lundy) - 11:54
2. Mr Thompson Goes To Dublin - (With Kathleen Feenan) - 8:42
3. The Young Ulsterman Looks For A Job - (With Jack Hudson & Paul Boskett) - 6:15
4. Saint Patrick Returns - 4:58

=== Side 2 ===
1. Orange Lily - 6:41
2. The History Lesson - 1:04
3. Romeo and Juliet - (With Jean Lundy) - 11:16
4. The Man From Ballymena - (With Jack Hudson) - 7:22
5. We're Here For Such A Little Time - 2:16

== Re-release ==
Emerald Music re-released the album in 1999 in a four-disc boxset to commemorate the 25th Anniversary of Young's death. The album was boxed with three of Young's other comedy albums (Very Much Live In Canada, Behind the Barricades and Young and Foolish). The album was marketed as James Young: Ireland's Greatest Comic Legend Volume 1.
