= Sam Cree =

Northern Irish playwright (1928–1980)

- Born: 19 February 1928; Northern Ireland
- Died: 26 October 1980 (aged 52); Northern Ireland
- Occupation: Playwright
- Years active: 1954–1980

Samuel Raymond Cree (1928–1980) was a Northern Irish playwright. During the 1960s and 1970s he wrote several long running and popular plays for comedians James Young and Jimmy Logan. His plays remain a favourite with Northern Ireland audiences and amateur theatre companies.

== Life ==
Sam Cree was born in Lisburn on 19 February 1928, the son of Robert Campbell Cree and his wife Sarah (née Hanna). Early in his life he worked in a drawing office in Lisburn. Whilst there he was asked to do 'something entertaining' for the company's Christmas party. Cree wrote a sketch called A Day in the Life of a managing director. Cree would continue writing these sketches, much to the embarrassment of his co-workers.

Driven by this success Cree submitted a sketch to comedian James Young for inclusion in his summer variety show. Young's business partner Jack Hudson claimed that it was the worst script he had ever read. The set required a street of houses, the dialogue was unfunny and there was no punch line. Young wrote to Cree and thanked him for his efforts. Rather than discourage Cree, Young suggested that Cree come to his next show to get a better idea of what was required. Cree took full advantage of Young's offer and kept the letter saying it was his first professional criticism.

Cree's work would frequently appear in Young's shows from then on. Young would give Cree his sketch ideas and Cree would quickly turn the ideas into workable scripts.

Following the withdrawal of Sam Thompson's play Over The Bridge from Ulster Group Theatre, Young was invited to bring his unique comedy talents to the venue. Young asked Cree to adapt Glenn Melvyn's The Love Match for an Ulster audience.

The plot of Cree's adaption followed Alec Galbraith, a fanatical supporter of Linfield Football Club, whose son Davy joins rival team Glentoran. The play premiered on 8 March 1960 and ran for ten weeks. The play was a success and Young and Hudson became joint managing directors of the Group Theatre in Autumn 1960. To follow up on their success they asked Cree to pen a sequel to The Love Match. Cree obliged by writing Wedding Fever.

The premiere of Wedding Fever was attended by the Prime Minister of Northern Ireland, Lord Brookeborough and his wife, Belfast Lord Mayor Sir Robin Kinahan and other VIPs. Cree's play ran for 42 weeks and its success allowed the Group Theatre to clear its debt. An agent offered Cree £500 to the rights to Wedding Fever. Cree didn't sell and later his plays were making up to £3,000 a day.

Following Wedding Fever, Cree sought success away from James Young. He wanted to be out from under Young's shadow and wanted to write without interference from the show's star.

Cree wrote for Scottish comedian Jimmy Logan who appeared in numerous Cree sketches and his plays Cupid Wore Skirts, Married Bliss, Second Honeymoon and Wedding Fever.

Cree was offered £80,000 for his play Cupid Wore Skirts and during the height of his success he spent three weeks in Hollywood touring the Studios and meeting the likes of Frank Sinatra, Jerry Lewis, Dean Martin and Liza Minnelli.

Cree would also write for George Formby and Arthur Askey.

Cree's later plays premiered at the Arts Theatre, Belfast run by actor/manager Hubert R. "Hibbie" Wilmot.

Following the start of The Troubles, however, most of the Theatres in Belfast went dark due to civil unrest. During this time Cree attempted to find success with a promotions business. However, he was not as successful as he had been as a playwright.

Cree continued to write, however and even following the onset of illness he would continue to joke. Webster would visit him in hospital to read material with him. Cree would state he had 'one foot in the grate'. 'Don't you mean one foot in the grave?' she asked. 'No,' he said. 'One foot in the grate. I want to be cremated.'

Following the failure of his promotions business, Cree suffered a period of illness. This, along with his wife's unexpected death led to Cree's own death in 1980 at the age of 52.

Cree's plays are often performed by amateur dramatic companies in Northern Ireland, due to their humour, recognisable characters and potential appeal to audiences of all ages.

== Works ==
=== Plays ===
- [The Love Match (1960) (based on the play of the same nam by Glenn Melvyn)
- Wedding Fever (1960)
- Second Honeymoon (1962)
- Fanci Free (1963) (With Elizabeth Quinn)
- Strictly for the Birds (1963)
- Cupid Wore Skirts (1965)
- Married Bliss (1965)
- Widows' Paradise (1966)
- Don't Tell The Wife (1967)
- Stop It Nurse (1968)
- Family Fever (1968)
- The Mating Season (1969)
- Separate Beds (1970)
- The Love Nest (1971)
- The Bed (play) (1971)
- Busman's Holiday (1973)
- Let's Get Laid
- Love & Marriage (A One-act play)
- Pyjama Tops
- Sink or Slim
- Tickle Your Fancy
- Wimpsie (A Pantomime)

=== Television ===
- The Love Match (Based on the play by Glenn Melvyn) (1965)
- Mugs and Money (Based on the play by Joseph Tomelty) (1965)
- Goodnight Mrs Puffin (Based on the play by Arthur Lovegrove) (1965)
- The Trouble With Alec (1965)
- A Scrape of the Pen (Based on the play by David Kirk) (1965)
- All This, and Christmas Too! (1971)
- The Mating Season (1976)
- Mary Rose (Based on the play by J. M. Barrie) (1981)

=== Film ===
- Let's Get Laid (1978)
