= James Young (album) =

Compilation album by James Young
- Released: 1975
- Recorded: 1966–1973
- Genre: Comedy
- Label: Emerald Music
- Producer: Peter Lloyd

James Young chronology
The Young Ulsterman (1973)	James Young (1975)	Forever Young (1988)

James Young is the tenth comedy album released by Northern Irish comedian and actor James Young and the first to be released posthumously.

The album cover features a picture taken by Stanley Matchett of Young at his home, 'Camelot', in Ballyhalbert. The back cover features sleeve notes written by Young's former partner Jack Hudson.

It is a mix of Young's sketches, serious monologues and comedy songs.

== Track listing ==
=== Side 1 ===
1. Meet James Young
2. Smithfield Market
3. Orange Lily
4. Behind The Barricades
5. The Presentation

=== Side 2 ===
1. Gerry's Walls
2. A Boy Finds Out the Facts
3. The Ballymena Cowboy
4. T.V. Commercial
5. I Believe in Ulster

=== Side 3 ===
1. I Married a Papish
2. Carpenter Crimmond
3. The Stranger

=== Side 4 ===
1. The Ould Blackman
2. Wee Davy
3. Slum Clearance
4. The Feud
