= Very Much Live In Canada =

Live album by James Young
- Released: 1971
- Genre: Comedy
- Length: 58:02
- Label: Emerald Music

James Young chronology
The Ballymena Cowboy (1970)	Very Much Live In Canada (1971)	The Young Ulsterman (1973)

Very Much Live In Canada is the eighth comedy album released by Northern Irish comedian and actor James Young.

With his eighth album, Young abandoned the comic songs of his recent work and returned to the format of his earlier releases. Very Much Live in Canada features a mixture of sketches and serious monologues recorded in front of a live audience in Toronto, Ontario, Canada and features of mix of new material and new versions previously released material.

== Track listing ==
=== Side 1 ===
1. Hello Toronto (Meet James Young) - 9:08
2. Wee Davy - 5:01
3. The Letter - 6:39
4. The Matrimonial Agency - 8:27

=== Side 2 ===
1. The Drama Critic - 5:27
2. Ecumenical Ball - 4:32
3. The Belfast Working Man - 5:36
4. The Engagement Ring - 4:29
5. The Schoolboy (Wee Sammy) - 2:25
6. Farewell To Canada - 3:22

== Re-release ==
Emerald Music re-released the album in 1999 in a four-disc boxset to commemorate the 25th Anniversary of Young's death. The album was boxed with three of Young's other comedy albums (The Young Ulsterman, Behind the Barricades and Young and Foolish). The album was marketed as James Young: Ireland's Greatest Comic Legend Volume 1.
