= James Young (comedian) =

Irish actor and comedian (1918–1974)

- Born: James Alexander Young; 23 May 1918; Ballymoney Ireland
- Died: 5 July 1974 (aged 56); Belfast, Northern Ireland
- Occupations: Actor, Comedian
- Years active: 1944–1974

James Alexander Young (23 May 1918 – 5 July 1974), better known as Jimmy Young or simply Our Jimmy, was a Northern Irish actor and comedian born in Ballymoney and brought up in Belfast.

He performed on stage and television. His comedy records sold over a quarter of a million copies. His stage shows are most closely associated with the Group Theatre, where his one-man show gained a listing in the Guinness Book of Records as the longest running in the world. He also toured extensively across Ireland, Canada and the United States.

He is best remembered for the characters in his sketches, which uniquely reflected the character of the people of Belfast. These included "Orange Lily", "The Lady from Cherryvalley", and "Derek the Window Cleaner" from the BBC Radio Ulster series The McCooeys. He was also one of the first comedians to confront the Troubles in his material, while still appealing to both sides of the divided community.

A blue plaque in his memory is displayed at his birthplace in Union Street, Ballymoney and at his family's home in Fernwood Street, Ormeau Road, Belfast.

== Life ==
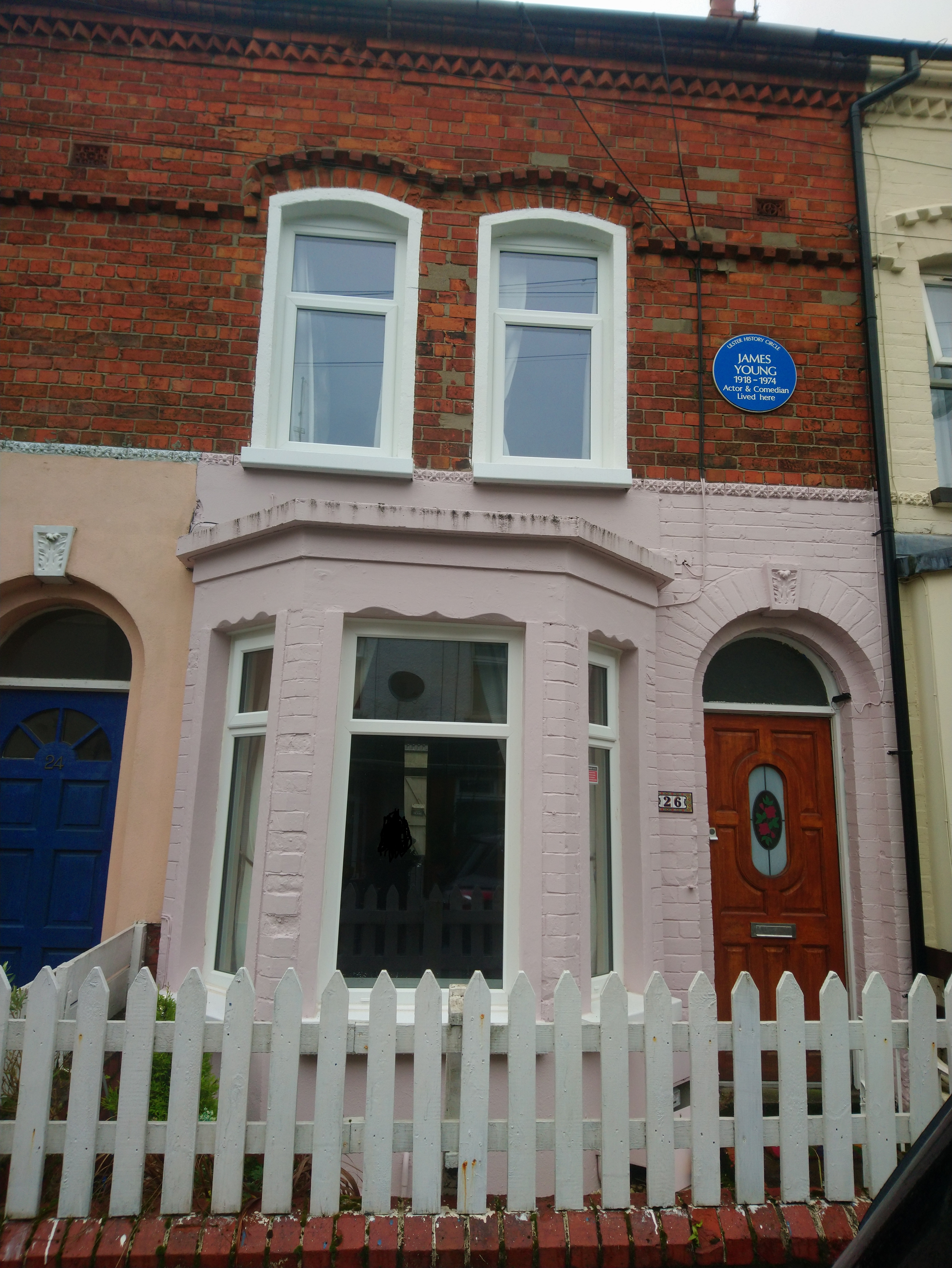
26 Fernwood Street, Belfast, where Young lived.

James Alexander Young was born on 23 May 1918 at 33 Union Street Ballymoney, the fourth child of Alexander Young, a bread server, and Grace Woodrow. In the economic uncertainty following World War I, the Youngs moved to the industrial Belfast where Alexander found work as a stable hand for a local bakery. Until the age of 14, Young attended the Cooke Church School off the Ravenhill Road. Even at this early stage, Young's natural talent for humour was evident. His mother would often tell him, "Stop impersonating the visitors. Because after you do, I find it impossible to take them seriously."

During his youth, Young's mother would frequently take him to the theatres around Belfast. At the age of six, Young went with his mother to see a show starring Jimmy O'Dea. O'Dea would be a massive influence on Young who, like Young, was a highly skilled comic and female impersonator. He would also be influenced by many visiting English music hall acts.

At the age of 14, Young left school and found work as a rent collector for a local estate agent. Young collected rent from some of the toughest districts in Belfast. Young visited homes in the Falls Road, Shankill Road and Crumlin Road areas of the town. It was during these visits he would find the inspiration for many of his future comedy characters.

After two years, Young tired of collecting rent and volunteered for the Savoy Players, an English company based at the Grand Opera House during World War II. Young performed the odd jobs backstage for the company but soon wanted to appear on stage. He joined the Youth Hostel Association Drama Group in 1943 and, in the first year, he won the award for best actor for his performance in A Story For Today by Jack Loudan.

Due in part to the praise for his performance in A Story For Today, Young was offered a role in the Ulster Group Theatre's production of Joseph Tomelty's Right Again, Barnum. Young appeared in further Group Theatre productions and productions for other companies in Belfast but, in 1944, Young left Northern Ireland to seek greater success in England.

He found work in a repertory company based at the Stockport Hippodrome near Manchester, appearing in over a hundred productions across different genres. He soon left the company and joined the West End production of Seán O'Casey's Red Roses for Me. The play ran for seven months and was a great success. Following this, Young got to work with his hero Jimmy O'Dea in his production of Phil the Flutter's Ball. However, following an accident with a member of the audience, Young was let go from the show.

Young then joined a show that was being arranged by ENSA and was due to tour the Middle East. While on the tour, Young was to meet Jack Hudson who would become a major part of his personal and professional life until his death.

At the end of the tour, Young started to feel homesick for Northern Ireland and he, along with Hudson, returned to Belfast. They moved into a flat on the Newtownards Road above a butcher's shop. Young returned to the Ulster Group Theatre, while Hudson became a manager of a local ballroom.

Success was not forthcoming and, for a time, Young and Hudson considered emigrating to Australia. Young's luck was to change, however, when he was cast in Joseph Tomelty's BBC Radio Ulster series The McCooeys. Tomelty devised a character called Derek, loosely based on the character Young played in Right Again, Barnum. Derek was the camp window cleaner of the title characters. Derek appeared in only five episodes of the series but was a massive hit with the public and made Young a household name.

Young soon began to receive lucrative offers to make appearances that were the equivalent of several months' work at the Group. Driven by this success, Young and Hudson formed James Young Productions and were soon making appearances across the country. The shows featured Young and Hudson in sketches, interspersed with musical and dance numbers.

In 1951, Young was offered his own BBC radio series. The Young Idea was another success and spawned several series in the following years. The series continued to raise Young's profile and, in 1954, he realised his dream of appearing in his own show at the Grand Opera House.

Young established a lucrative pattern of spring and autumn shows in the Empire Theatre, Belfast, summer shows in Bangor, a radio series and shows in London. However, the Empire's owners decided to sell the venue and it eventually became a Littlewoods store.

Following the withdrawal of Sam Thompson's play Over The Bridge from Ulster Group Theatre, Young was invited to bring his unique comedy talents to the venue. Young asked one of his popular sketch writers Sam Cree to adapt Glenn Melvyn's The Love Match for an Ulster audience. The play premiered on 8 March 1960, and ran for ten weeks. The play was a success and Young and Hudson were invited to become joint managing directors of the Group Theatre in the autumn of 1960.

Around this time, Young and Hudson's relationship moved from a personal to a more business-based arrangement. However, the two would remain firm friends and colleagues for the rest of Young's life.

The Group Theatre became Young's theatrical home for the next decade and he would premiere hit play after hit play. Young would function as director and star of these plays, which he would alternate with a string of successful one man shows. Recordings of these one man shows would form the basis for a series of comic records released by Emerald Records. He was listed in the Guinness Book of Records for having the longest running one man show ever and it was also claimed that he sold more albums in Northern Ireland than The Beatles.

Young also toured his one-man shows in Canada and America playing in the Wilshire Ebell Theatre.

In 1972, Young was at the height of his career and BBC Northern Ireland offered him the chance to appear in his own television series. The first episode of the show, Saturday Night, aired on 14 October 1972.

In 1974, Young telephoned Hudson to inform him that there had been mysterious enquiries into his date of birth. Hudson's suspicion that Young was to be nominated in the New Year's honours list were apparently correct. Young was due to be appointed MBE at the start of 1975.

However, Young was never to receive his award. While driving home on the afternoon of 5 July 1974, Young suffered a massive heart attack and was pronounced dead at the scene.

In 2013, a biographical play about Young was shelved after the Sunday World, a sensationalist Belfast tabloid, published unsubstantiated allegations that he had been involved in child abuse.

== Theatre credits ==
The following is a list of plays in which Young performed in the premiere production.

=== As actor and director ===
- The Love Match (1960) – By Glenn Melvyn, Adapted for a Northern Irish setting by Sam Cree (As Alec Galbraith)
- Wedding Fever (1960) – By Sam Cree (As Alec Galbraith)
- All the King's Horses (1961) – By John McDonnell (As William MacStay)
- Friends and Neighbours (1962) – By Austin Steele, Adapted for a Northern Irish setting by Young & John McDonnell (As Alec Galbraith)
- Love Locked Out (1963) – By David Kirk, Adapted for a Northern Irish setting by Young & John McDonnell (As Charlie Doherty)
- An Apple a Day (1963) – By John McDonnell (As Andy Adams)
- Wish You Were Here (1964) By John McDonnell (As Albert McFetridge)
- Silver Wedding (1964) By John McDonnell (As Alec Galbraith)
- Holiday Spirit (1965) By John McDonnell (As Harold Swann and Female Ghost)
- Sticks and Stones (1965) By John McDonnell (As William Thompson)
- Lucky Break (1966) – By John McDonnell (As Lucky Gallaher)
- The Wrong Fut (1966) By John McDonnell (As Alec Galbraith)
- Up the Long Ladder (1967) By John McDonnell (As Billy Bothwell)
- The Cat and the Fiddle (1971) By John McDonnell

=== As actor ===
- Right Again, Barnum (1943) By Joseph Tomelty (As Willie John Marley)
- Stars of Brickfield Street By John Coulter
- Mountain Post (1948) – By George Shiels (As Albert Magellan)
- Bannister's Cafe (1949) – By Harry Sinton Gibson (As William McNinch)
- Master Adams By Patricia O'Connor (As John the Post)
- All Soul's Night (1949) – By Joseph Tomelty (As A Figure)
- A Title for Buxey (1949) – By Cecil Cree (Percy Todd)
- Arty (1951) – By J.R. Mageean & Ruddick Millar (As Arty)

== Discography ==
=== Albums ===
- Young at Heart – (1966)
- Young and Foolish – (1967)
- It's Great to be Young – (1968)
- James Young's 4th – (1969)
- James Young Sings Ulster Party Pieces – (1969)
- Behind the Barricades – (1970)
- The Ballymena Cowboy – (1970)
- Very Much Live In Canada – (1971)
- The Young Ulsterman – (1973)
- James Young – (1975)
- Forever Young – (1988)
- The Very Best of James Young – (2001)

=== Singles ===
- I Protest / I’m the Only Catholic (On the Linfield Team) – (1966)
- The Wrong Fut / The BBC Investigate – (1966)
- Gerry's Walls / Smithfield Market, Belfast – (1967)
- Remember 1960 / Me Da – (1968)
- The Clyde Valley / Non Sectarian Football Team – (1969)
- Behind the Barricades / Ulster's Space Man – (1970)
- God Bless the working man / I Believe In Ulster – (1971)
