= Sarmad =

Sarmad (Arabic: سرمد), also transliterated as Sarmad, Sermed, Sarmed, is a given name of Arabic origin meaning “eternal” or “everlasting.” The name is used in Iraq mainly as well as in Iran and other parts of the Middle East. It is not associated with any particular religious tradition and is typically given to boys, though it is occasionally used for girls.. Notable people with the name include:

- Sarmad Ali, Pakistani politician
- Sarmad Bhatti (born 1991), Pakistani cricketer
- Sarmad Hameed (born 1994), Pakistani cricketer
- Sarmad Jalal Osmany (1950–2025), Pakistani jurist
- Sarmad Kashani (1590–1661), Persian mystic, poet and saint
- Sarmad Sultan Khoosat (born 1979), Pakistani actor
- Sarmad Masud, British filmmaker
- Sarmad Rasheed (born 1982), Iraqi footballer
- Sarmad Sehbai (born 1945), Pakistani poet, playwright, and film and theatre director
- Sarmad Sindhi (1961–1996), stage name of Abdul Rehman Mughul, Pakistani Sindhi folk singer and songwriter
- Sarmad Tariq (1975–2014), Pakistani storyteller and motivational speaker

== Sources ==
- Sarmad at babynames.com
