= It's Great to Be Young (album) =

It's Great to be Young

Live album by James Young
- Released: 1968
- Recorded: 1968, At the Ulster Group Theatre
- Genre: Comedy
- Length: 54:36
- Label: Emerald Music
- Producer: Peter Lloyd

James Young chronology
Young and Foolish (1967)	It's Great to be Young (1968)	James Young's 4th (1969)

It's Great to be Young is the third comedy album released by Northern Irish comedian and actor James Young.

The album cover features a picture taken by Stanley Matchett of Young in drag seated on a bench in the grounds of the City Hall, Belfast. The back cover features sleeve notes by Young.

== Track listing ==
=== Side 1 ===
1. Meet James Young - 6:54
2. Carpenter Crimmond - 4:03
3. Living in Hope - 6:59
4. The Ould Blackman - 2:38
5. Romeo and Juliet - 11:22

=== Side 2 ===
1. The Chambermaid - 13:22
2. The Feud - 7:21
3. At Tte Labour Exchange - 2:40
4. The Critic - 5:25

== Re-release ==
Emerald Music re-released the album in 1999 in a four-disc boxset to commemorate the 25th anniversary of Young's death. The album was boxed with three of Young's other comedy albums (Young at Heart, James Young Sings Ulster Party Pieces and James Young's 4th). The album was marketed as James Young: Ireland's Greatest Comic Legend Volume 2.
