= This Is the Way the World Ends (Dexter) =

- Dexter episode
- Episode no.: Season 6 Episode 12
- Directed by: John Dahl
- Written by: Scott Buck; Wendy West
- Cinematography by: Romeo Tirone
- Editing by: Michael Ruscio
- Original release date: December 18, 2011
- Running time: 51 minutes

Guest appearances
- Colin Hanks as Travis Marshall (special guest star); Aimee Garcia as Jamie Batista; Billy Brown as Mike Anderson; Josh Cooke as Louis Greene; Rya Kihlstedt as Dr. Michelle Ross

Episode chronology
← Previous "Talk to the Hand (Dexter)"	Next → "Are You...?"
- Dexter season 6

"This Is the Way the World Ends" is the twelfth episode and season finale of the sixth season of the American crime drama television series Dexter. It is the 72nd overall episode of the series and was written by Scott Buck and Wendy West, and directed by John Dahl. It originally aired on Showtime on December 18, 2011.

Set in Miami, the series centers on Dexter Morgan, a forensic technician specializing in bloodstain pattern analysis for the fictional Miami Metro Police Department, who leads a secret parallel life as a vigilante serial killer, hunting down murderers who have not been adequately punished by the justice system due to corruption or legal technicalities. In the episode, Dexter tries to locate Travis before he completes the last tableau.

According to Nielsen Media Research, the episode was seen by an estimated 2.23 million household viewers and gained a 1.0 ratings share among adults aged 18–49. The episode received mixed reviews from critics, with many expressing disappointment with the closure to the main season's storylines. However, critics expressed intrigue with the final scene.

== Plot ==
Dexter (Michael C. Hall) spends the night floating in the waters off Miami and is rescued by a passing migrant boat. Homicide is called to a double murder scene that turns out to be Travis' hideout. Inside, Dexter sees a depiction of the last tableau with his face painted in as the face of The Beast, and defaces the face with a hammer before anyone else can see it.

Batista (David Zayas) informs Quinn (Desmond Harrington) that he has put in for a transfer for Quinn due to his increasing irresponsibility, to which Quinn objects and storms out. Louis (Josh Cooke) asks Masuka (C. S. Lee) if he can have a full-time position at Metro once his internship ends. When Masuka asks him, "What about your video game?" Louis replies that it "just doesn't seem important any more" while looking past Masuka at Dexter. Debra (Jennifer Carpenter) tells Dexter he must return to the abandoned church to wrap up forensics.

Travis (Colin Hanks) sees that the police have found his hideout, so he retreats to Dexter's apartment. Travis hears Jamie (Aimee Garcia) in the home with Harrison. Realizing that Harrison is Dexter's son, Travis decides to use the boy as his sacrificial lamb in his final act to bring about the end of the world. Debra dispatches officers to skyscrapers in downtown Miami on a hunch that this is where the final tableau will be executed. Dexter attends Harrison's Noah's Ark play, after which Travis abducts Harrison. Dexter knows which skyscraper Travis has chosen, and arrives moments before Travis can sacrifice Harrison. Travis releases Harrison when Dexter feigns injecting himself with his tranquilizers. Dexter surprises Travis and beats him unconscious. Homicide arrives after the officer on guard fails to respond via radio and they find him dead with no sign of Travis.

Debra rushes into her therapist's office and recounts that Dexter actually said, "I love you" to her, and decides she wants to tell him she is in love with him. Travis awakens on Dexter's table at the abandoned church and proclaims that he was doing God's work. Deb goes to the church unannounced and sees Dexter kill Travis. Dexter hears someone gasp, looks up and sees his sister, and says "Oh God."

== Production ==
=== Development ===
The episode was written by Scott Buck and Wendy West, and directed by John Dahl. This was Buck's 14th writing credit, West's seventh writing credit, and Dahl's 11th directing credit.

== Reception ==
=== Viewers ===
In its original American broadcast, "This Is the Way the World Ends" was seen by an estimated 2.23 million household viewers with a 1.0 in the 18–49 demographics. This means that 1 percent of all households with televisions watched the episode. This was a 16% increase in viewership from the previous episode, which was watched by an estimated 1.92 million household viewers with a 0.9 in the 18–49 demographics.

=== Critical reviews ===
"This Is the Way the World Ends" received mixed reviews. Matt Fowler of IGN gave the episode a "great" 8.5 out of 10, and wrote, "So. All in all, not a bad Dexter finale. The icky, gross "Deb is in love with Dexter" story played out exactly like I hoped it would - with her feeling as close as she possibly could to Dexter right before... the moment the series has been building up to!"

Joshua Alston of The A.V. Club gave the episode a "C" grade and wrote, "if I was still optimistic about this show's prospects of winding down to a satisfying conclusion, I'd have been really jazzed by that cliffhanger, which was pretty much the only bright spot in what was otherwise a season six episode of Dexter." Richard Rys of Vulture wrote, "Say what you will about Season 6 — and the consensus seems to be that this has been the most inconsistent and possibly the worst Dexter chapter of all — the final moments of last night's finale felt like redemption. Sure, there were still plenty of the obvious plot holes that have plagued the show recently and almost no attention was paid to anyone other than Travis, Debra, and Dexter. But though it was inevitable that Deb would one day meet Dexter's dark side, the questions of when and how have been looming large."

Ken Tucker of Entertainment Weekly wrote, "Dexter closed out its sixth season on Sunday night with an episode that attempted to redeem the uneven, overloaded, even peculiar quality of what had come before it. The 12th episode, titled “This Is the Way the World Ends,” only lived up to the finish of that familiar phrase." Matt Roush of TV Guide wrote, "This is the sort of game-changing twist a long-running show like Dexter needs to propel it into its final end game, which will occupy the next two seasons."

Chase Gamradt of BuddyTV wrote, "This has been a season of ups and downs, but overall it wasn't too bad. It was better than season 5, but nowhere near as awesome as season 4." Ian Grey of Salon wrote, "There's apparently two seasons of Dexter left. And a good deal of the remaining episodes will address the question: How deep is your love, Deb? Or maybe the question to ask the writers is this: How low will you drag your finest creation?"

Billy Grifter of Den of Geek wrote, "Having just watched "This Is The Way The World Ends", I'm both excited by the prospect of season seven (and eight), but at the same time, concerned that standards appear to be slipping. In all fairness, this was possibly the best episode of the season, and certainly got the adrenalin flowing, as Travis and Dexter faced their interpersonal demons." Matt Richenthal of TV Fanatic gave the episode a 3.5 star rating out of 5 and wrote, "Many fans may believe this will make up for an incredibly sloppy, disjointed, suspense-free season. I have no doubt the producers are banking on that, as sites and message boards and water coolers will now be dominated by talk of where things will go in season seven. But don't count me among those cheering because we're seemingly headed in a new, exciting direction. I can't let go of how we got there."

Claire Zulkey of Los Angeles Times wrote, "I loved the shocking twist and can't wait to see what happens next between Dexter and Deb. This season flagged in the last few weeks and the finale certainly poured some life back into it. “Deb learns the truth about Dexter” is a card the writers have been holding onto for a long time and I'm glad they finally threw it down." Television Without Pity gave the episode a "D" grade.
