= All the King's Men (board game) =

Old board game no longer produced

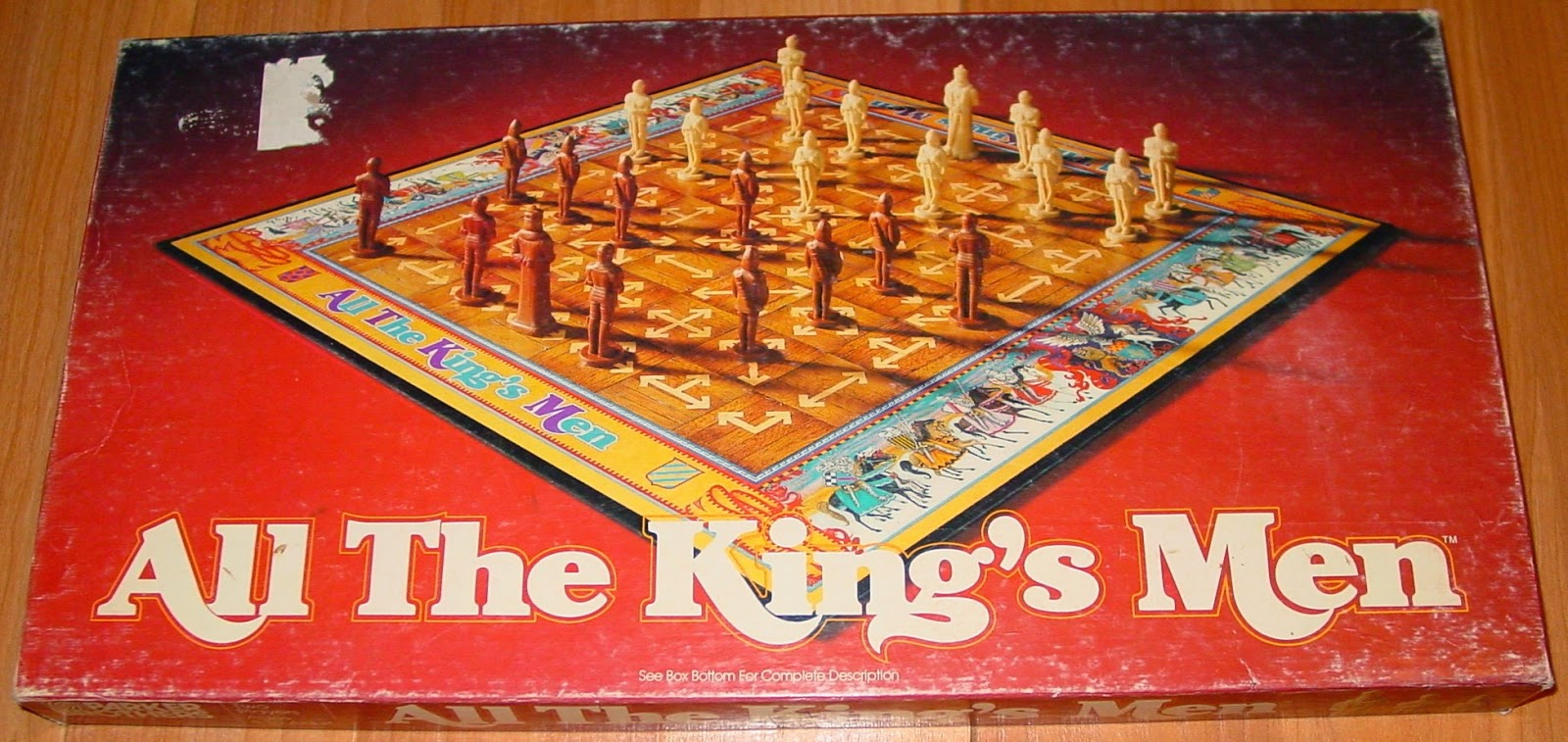
- Cover of All the King's Men
- Designers: Reuben Klamer, Perry Grant
- Publishers: Parker Brothers
- Publication: 1979
- Genres: Board game, strategy, abstract
- Players: 2
- Setup time: 1 minute
- Playing time: 5-10 minutes
- Age range: 8+
- Skills: Logic, strategy, tactics

All the King's Men (also known as Take the Brain), is a strategic, chess-like board game made and published by the Parker Brothers in 1979. It is heavily influenced by the board game Smess: The Ninny's Chess, which was also published by the Parker Brothers in 1970. All the King's Men was only produced in 1979, and can only be found on online marketplaces now.

== Gameplay ==
The game is played on a 8x7 game board where there are two players versing each other. Each player has 12 pieces including a king, 4 knights, and 7 archers.

The players must place their archers in the second rank of their section of their side of the board, their king in the middle of the first rank, and 4 knights in the first rank, 2 on each side of the king touching one another.

On each square, there are arrows pointing 1-4 directions. This shows where the piece can move if it's their turn. The king and archer may only move one square per turn, while knights can move any number of squares in one direction. To capture a piece, you have to move your piece to where the piece wanting to capture is. Remember to use the directions on the square for offense and defense.

To win the game, you must capture the opposing side's king, just like how you would with a knight or archer. If you are a turn away from capturing the enemy king, you must say "Threat" to alert the other player of his king's position. If your king is endangered, you can move the king away from the enemy piece, move a piece between your king and the enemy piece, or capture the piece trying to capture your king.

== Reception ==
John Filiatreau for The Courier-Journal said that "thousands of people, intimidated by the seriousness with which chess is usually played, keep looking for a simpler version. All the King's Men fills the bill."

The Springfield News-Sun described the game as "designed along the classic lines of royal conflict", calling it "pleasantly less intense" than chess and that its "unique arrow-patterned game board provides extra interest too; the way you play those arrows can make or break your game."
