= Forever Young (James Young album) =

Compilation album by James Young
- Released: 1988
- Recorded: 1970s
- Genre: Comedy
- Label: Emerald Music

James Young chronology
James Young (1975)	Forever Young (1988)	The Very Best of James Young (2011)

Forever Young is the eleventh comedy album released by Northern Irish comedian and actor James Young and the second to be released posthumously.

At the time of his death, Young had been working on a new album for release. Young's custom was that all material should be reviewed before release to ensure its quality. When Young died, Emerald Music decided not to release the material. Emerald were persuaded to release the material, however, with additional background music and effects.

== Track listing ==
=== Side 1 ===
1. James "Foo" Young
2. The Lord Mayor Speaks
3. The Crabbed old woman
4. Ulster's Space Man
5. Our Wee Boy
6. James Joins Up
7. Hilda

=== Side 2 ===
1. Oh Come Ye to Ulster
2. What's On Tonight
3. The Wife (Big Aggie)
4. An American View of Ulster
5. School Days
6. My Old Slum Clearance Home
7. The P.M. Speaks
