= Jeffrey A. Nesbit =

American author

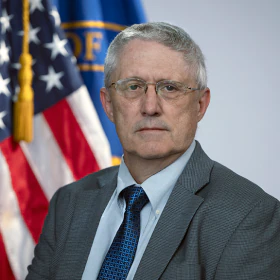

Assistant Secretary of Health and Human Services for Public Affairs
- Incumbent
- Assumed office August 21, 2023
- President: Joe Biden

Jeffrey A. Nesbit is an American author and politician serving as the Assistant Secretary of Health and Human Services for Public Affairs.

== Work ==
Nesbit's novel Perfect Ambition is the first of a three-book series surrounding the rise of a powerful political dynasty in American politics. His novel Peace begins the day that Israel decides to attack Iran's nuclear facilities, and explores what might happen next. Nesbit is the author of 20 novels such as The Insider, Ryun's Story and The Sioux Society with Tyndale, Zondervan, Thomas Nelson, Hodder & Stoughton, Harold Shaw (now part of Random House) and Victor Books (now David C. Cook).

He was former Vice President Dan Quayle's communications director at the White House, and a senior public affairs official in the U.S. Senate and federal agencies such as the FDA. Former FDA Commissioner David Kessler credited Nesbit with convincing the FDA to regulate the tobacco industry in the early 1990s ("A Question of Intent"). Nesbit was also a national journalist with Knight-Ridder, ABC News' (now defunct) Satellite News Channels, nationally syndicated columnist Jack Anderson and others, and managed his own public affairs consulting company. He also served as the Director of the Office of Legislative and Public Affairs at the National Science Foundation.

He and Ramona Tucker co-founded OakTara Publishers, an inspirational fiction publishing house, in 2006.

Jeff graduated from Duke University in 1978. He was on the Varsity track team and held eight school records.

== Books ==
=== Standalone novels ===
- Absolutely Perfect Summer
- All the King's Horses
- The Great Nothing Strikes Back
- The Sioux Society
- The Books of El
- The Capital Conspiracy
- The Insider: A Novel
- Degrees of Betrayal: Ryun's Story

=== Principalities & Powers ===
- Peace
- Oil
- Jude

=== The Capital Crew Series ===
- Crosscourt Winner
- A War of Words
- The Puzzled Prodigy
- The Lost Canoe
- The Reluctant Runaway
- Struggle with Silence

=== High Sierra Adventure Series ===
1. The Legend of the Great Grizzly
2. Cougar Chase
3. Setting the Trap
4. Mountaintop Rescue

=== The Worthington Destiny Series (with Kevan Leman) ===
1. Perfect Ambition (2015)
2. A Powerful Secret (2016)
3. A Primary Decision (2016)

=== Nonfiction ===
- Poison Tea: How big oil and big tobacco invented the Tea Party and captured the GOP, 2016
- This Is the Way the World Ends: How droughts and die-offs, heat waves and hurricanes are converging on America, 2018
