= Timeless Love (song) =

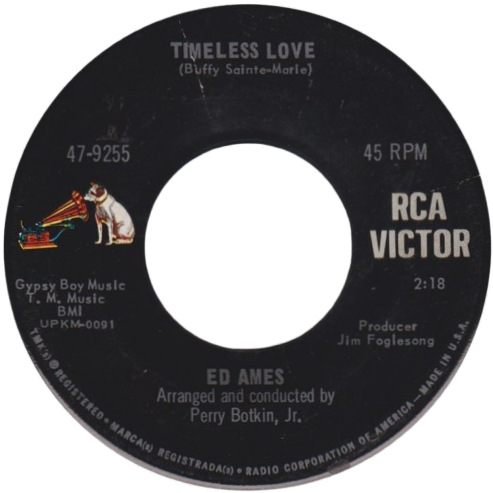

Single by Ed Ames

from the album When the Snow Is on the Roses
- B-side: "Two for the Road"
- Released: July 1967
- Studio: RCA's Music Center of the World, Hollywood, California
- Genre: Pop; easy listening
- Length: 2:18
- Label: RCA Victor Records
- Songwriter: Buffy Sainte-Marie
- Producer: Jim Foglesong

Ed Ames singles chronology
"Time, Time" (1967)	"Timeless Love" (1967)	"When the Snow Is on the Roses" (1967)

"Timeless Love" is a 1967 song written by Buffy Sainte-Marie. It was most notably performed by American singer and actor Ed Ames, whose version was released as a single by RCA Victor Records. The single nearly topped the US adult-oriented charts and scraped the pop charts as well.

== Background and release ==
Trade ad made by RCA Records for the single.

American singer Ed Ames achieved major success in early 1967 with two easy listening chart toppers "My Cup Runneth Over" and "Time, Time". His subsequent release was a love ballad written by Buffy Sainte-Marie, whose own album was on the charts during this time. The flip, "Two for the Road", was from the 20th Century-Fox Film Two for the Road. The single was produced by Jim Foglesong, and arranged by Perry Botkin, Jr. on the A-side, and by Mort Garson on the B-side. Both songs were included on his later When the Snow Is on the Roses album, with critics highlighting them.

== Critical reception ==
Professional ratings
Review scores
Source	Rating
Billboard	Positive (Spotlight)
Cashbox	Positive (Pick of the Week)

The single received a positive critical reception upon its release. Cashbox believed that the song "might easily prove a chart topper for Ed Ames. The side is a rich, gentle ode to Love that should generate plenty of consumer reaction." The publication noted "On the other side, 'Two For the Road' offers soft, lush, romantic sounds." Billboard magazine stated that "Penned by folksier Buffy Sainte-Marie and sung in the best Ames style, this sensitive ballad builds into a big production that should prove to be Ames' third hit in a row."

== Chart performance ==
"Timeless Love" successfully reached the US charts. It debuted on the Billboard Easy Listening chart in the issue dated August 5, 1967, reaching number 2 during a ten-week run on it. On the Record World Top-Non Rock chart the single peaked at number 3. The single reached a lower number 109 on the Cashbox Top 100 Singles, and number 101 on the Record World 100 Tops pop charts.

== Charts ==
Chart performance for "Timeless Love" by Ed Ames
Chart (1967)	Peak position
US Billboard Easy Listening	2
US Record World Top-Non Rock	3
US Record World 100 Top Pops	101
US Cashbox Top 100 Singles	109
