= Frank Mertens =

German musician

- Also known as: Maelstrom
- Born: Frank Sorgatz; 26 October 1961 (age 64); Enger, West Germany
- Genres: Synth-pop
- Occupations: Songwriter; keyboardist
- Instruments: Piano; keyboards; synthesizers
- Years active: 1982–1987, 1996

Frank Mertens (born Frank Sorgatz; 26 October 1961) is a German musician. He is a former member of the German synth-pop band Alphaville.

Mertens is a shy and quiet person who doesn't like to talk. Shortly after the success of their debut album, he left the band in December 1984, because he found public attention stressful.

After he left, he founded the group Lonely Boys with his girlfriend at the time Matine Lille (née Richter) and Felix Lille (né Schulte). Mertens disbanded the group in 1987 to study economics.

In 1991, Mertens moved to Paris to study art. In 1996, he moved back to Cologne, to work as a plastic artist.

During the same year, he started but never completed a musical project called Maelstrom, which was a combination of ambient-style music, impressionistic and colorful art in the form of paintings, sculptures, and etheric poetry.
