= Ulster Hall =

Concert hall in Belfast, Ireland

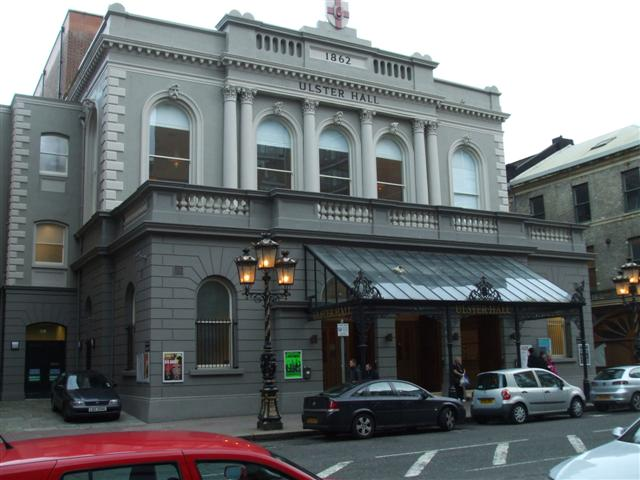
- Interactive map of Ulster Hall
- Location: Bedford Street; Belfast; Northern Ireland
- Coordinates: 54°35′41″N 5°55′50″W
- Owner: Belfast City Council
- Capacity: 1,000 seated, or 1,850 standing
- Type: Concert hall

Construction
- Built: 1859
- Opened: 1862
- Renovated: 2009

Website
- www.ulsterhall.co.uk

The Ulster Hall is a concert hall and grade A listed building in Belfast, Northern Ireland. Situated at 34 Bedford Street in Belfast city centre, the hall hosts concerts, classical recitals, craft fairs and political party conferences.

== History ==
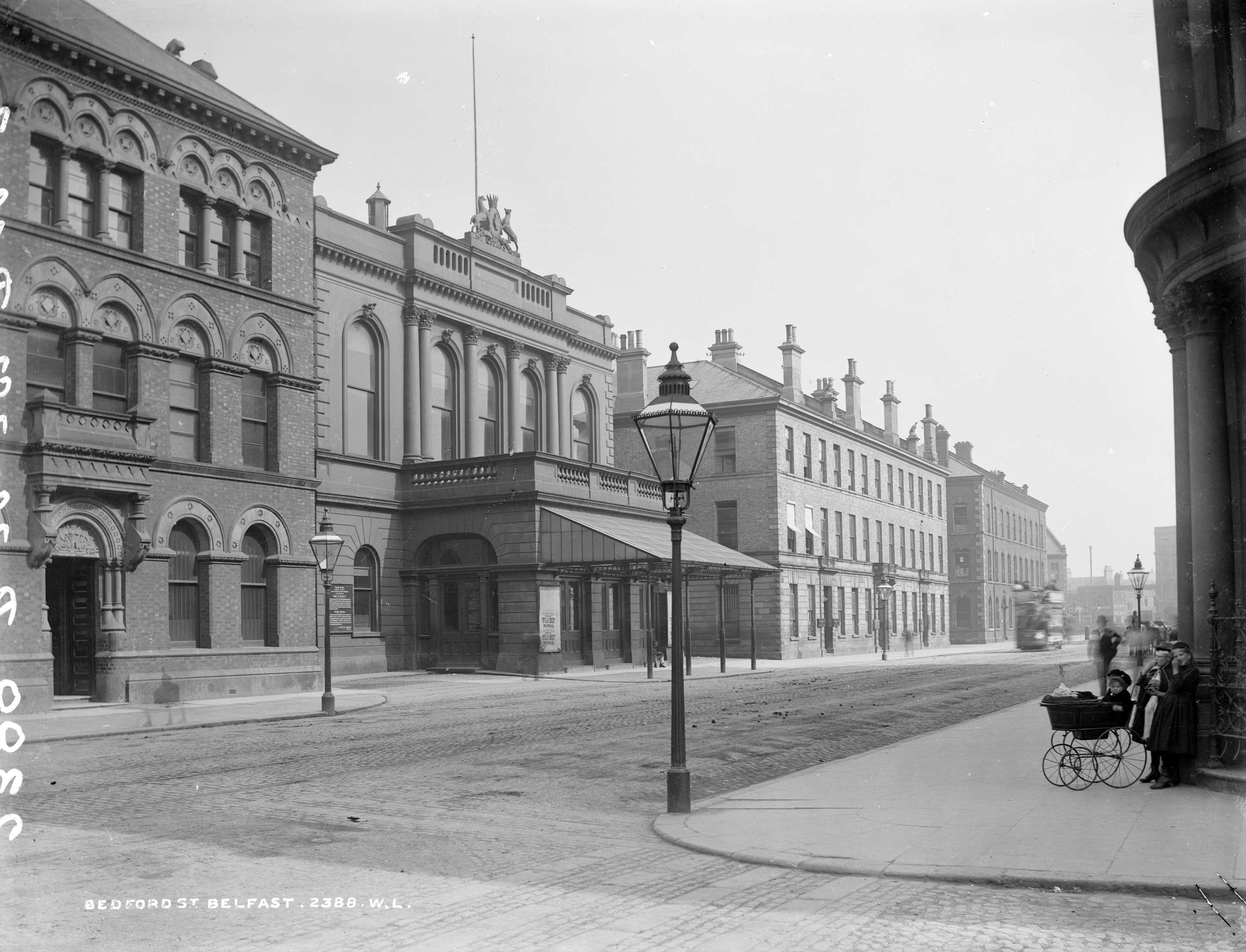
The Ulster Hall in an empty Bedford Street, c. 1890

Built in 1859 and opened in 1862, the hall's purpose was to provide the expanding city of Belfast with a multi-purpose venue of sufficient size. It was designed by William J. Barre (also responsible for the Albert Clock) for the Ulster Hall Company.

On its opening night on 12 May 1862, the hall was described by the local press as:

stand[ing] unexcelled, and all but unrivalled, as an edifice for the production of musical works. ... the hall is a great and unmingled success, and the public, no less than the proprietors, may feel the utmost gratification at a result at once so pleasant and so rare.(The Belfast News Letter, 1862)

a music hall fit for the production of any composition, and for the reception of any artist, however eminent (The Northern Whig, 14 May 1862)

In 1902 the hall was purchased by Belfast City Council (then named the Belfast Corporation) for £13,500 and it has been used as a public hall ever since. During World War II it was used as a dance hall to entertain American troops stationed in Northern Ireland.

=== Mulholland Grand Organ ===
The Ulster Hall features one of the oldest examples of a functioning classic English pipe organ. The Mulholland Grand Organ is named in honour of former Mayor of Belfast, Andrew Mulholland, who donated £3000 to the hall toward its cost in the 1860s. It was built by William Hill & Son and donated after the hall was officially opened. In the late 1970s, the organ was extensively restored to Hill's own original design. Mullholland's great-great-grandson, Henry Mulholland, 4th Baron Dunleath, oversaw the restoration.

=== Joseph Carey's Belfast scenes ===
In 1902, Belfast City Council commissioned the local artist Joseph W. Carey to produce thirteen scenes from Belfast history on canvas, to be mounted within the Ulster Hall. The scenes depict the city and the surrounding area, incorporating historical and mythological influences.

The paintings were restored in 1989 and again, by Kiffy Stainer-Hutchins & Co., King's Lynn, in 2009 (see 2007–2009 refurbishment, below).

=== Notable performances ===
The hall has hosted a massive variety of acts during its history, including readings by Charles Dickens and performances by actors, pop, opera, rock acts and singers.

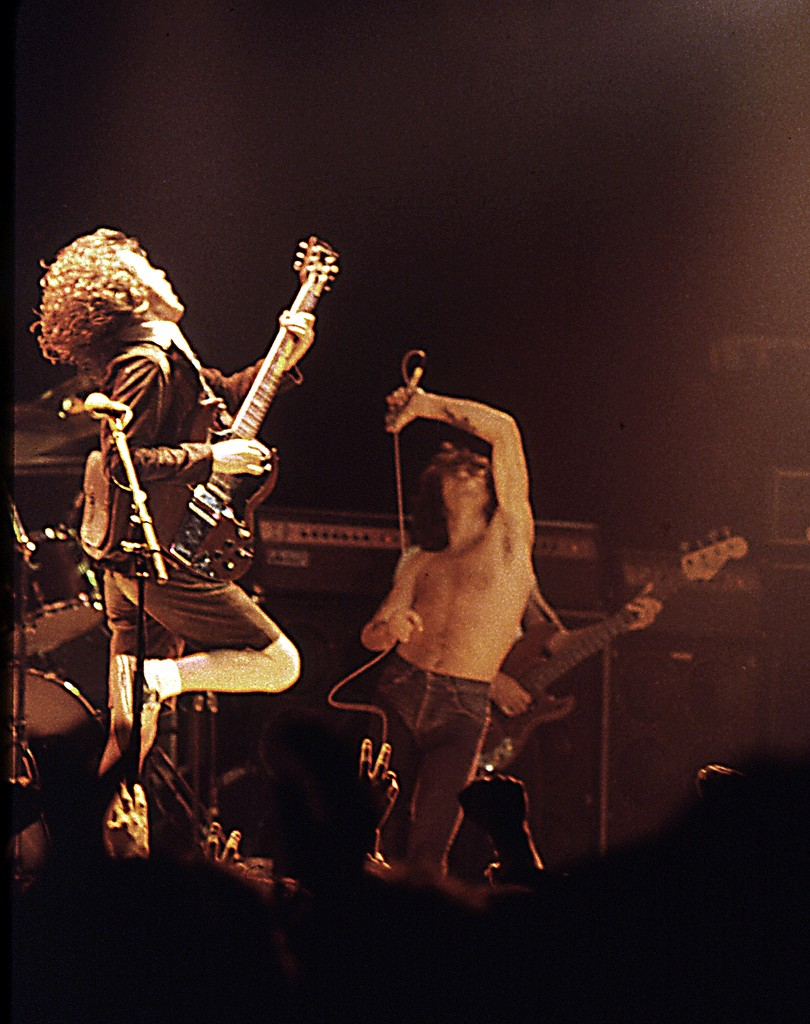
AC/DC performing in 1979.

- The Rolling Stones played at the hall in July 1964. They had only managed to play three songs before the concert was called off due to hysterical fans breaking up the show.
- The hall was the first venue in which Led Zeppelin performed their iconic song, "Stairway to Heaven" live, on 5 March 1971.
- Rory Gallagher performed in the Ulster Hall numerous times throughout his career. Notably during the height of The Troubles in 1974.
- Australian rock band AC/DC performed at the Ulster Hall in 1979.
- Gary Moore performed at the Ulster Hall in 1984 with Phil Lynott as a special guest, the event was filmed and included as part of the VHS tape Gary Moore - Emerald Aisles Live in Ireland.
- Metallica played there in September 1986 with Anthrax, shortly before the death of bassist Cliff Burton.
- Slayer played in September 1988 and returned at the start of their 1994 Divine Intervention European Tour.
- Simple Minds performed at the Ulster Hall on 22 November 1982 as part of their New Gold Dream tour and again in February 1984 on their Sparkle in the Rain tour.
- Snow Patrol performed at the Ulster Hall on 22 November 2004 after the release of their album "Final Straw".
- Machine Head returned to headline the Ulster Hall in 2012. Their first gig outside the USA was in the same venue with Slayer in 1994.
- Muse performed the first of a string of intimate gigs billed as the "Psycho UK Tour" at the hall on 15 March 2015.
- Westlife lead vocalist Shane Filan performed at the hall for his solo concert tour supporting his 2015 album Right Here in 2016.
- Mastodon performed at the Ulster Hall on 14 January 2019.
- Trivium played 'The Revanchist' live for the first time in Ulster Hall on 9 January 2023 on their Deadmen & Dragons tour.
- Loreen, the Swedish singer and two time Eurovision winner (Euphoria, 2012 & Tattoo, 2023) performed on the final date of her tour on 28 March 2025.

=== Notable political rallies ===
Since its opening, the Ulster Hall has staged political rallies for many different causes, most notably:

- 1886 and early 20th century – Lord Randolph Churchill and Sir Edward Carson called for opposition to Home Rule
- 1986 – the Ulster Resistance was launched at the hall, to oppose the Anglo-Irish Agreement
- 1995 – dissident loyalists called for an Orange economy for Northern Ireland, as well as the resignation of the then Orange Order Grand Master, the Rev. Martin Smyth
- 2002 – Sinn Féin staged a rally in the hall, at which 2,000 people joined to sing the Irish national anthem, "Amhrán na bhFiann"

=== Unionism ===
Ulster Hall has a longstanding historical association with Ulster unionism and from the late 19th century became the traditional venue for high-profile unionist rallies. Ulster Hall has been described as an "iconic venue for unionism", "synonymous with unionism", a "bastion of Ulster unionism", and the "birthplace of Ulster unionism". The Ulster Unionist Council (UUC) held its first public meeting in the Ulster Hall in 1905.

In early 1912 First Lord of the Admiralty Winston Churchill was invited to a rally on the subject of Irish Home Rule in Belfast at the behest of the Ulster Liberal Association. The Ulster Unionist Council passed a resolution declaring the Liberals intent to hold the demonstration a "deliberate challenge" and resolved to "take steps to prevent it being held". Churchill published a letter in the press reluctantly conceding the Ulster Hall venue and after difficulties the meeting took place at Celtic Park. In November 1995 Sinn Féin during the Northern Ireland peace process organised a rally in Ulster Hall; it was the first time nationalists had used the venue. Unionists on Belfast city council were outraged and threatened to try to have the booking cancelled. Leader of the Democratic Unionist Party (DUP) group in the council, Sammy Wilson described the Sinn Fein event at Ulster Hall as a "deliberate attempt to rub unionists noses in the dirt".

== 2009 refurbishment ==
In 2007, a major refurbishment plan was initiated by the Consarc Design Group, under the direction of architect and Everest mountaineer Dawson Stelfox. The main aim of the refurbishment was to restore the venue back to its original condition, while also modernising the building's facilities and providing better disabled access.

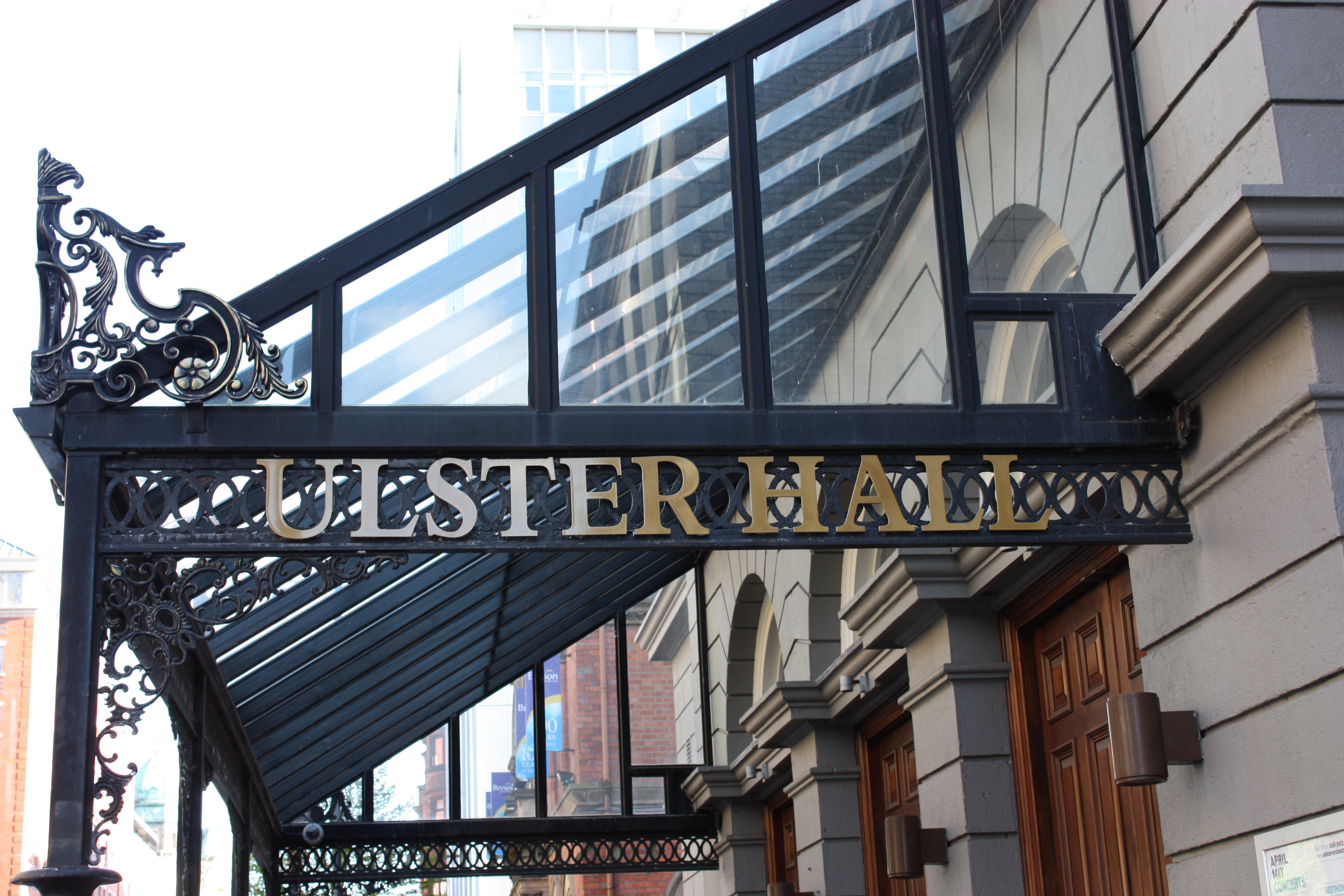
Detail of the Ulster Hall's wrought-iron entrance canopy.

The £8.5 million project included:

- Refit and redecoration of the Grand Hall, including reopening the windows which had been covered since the 1980s
- Installation of new removable seating on ground floor
- Recreation of the original metal balcony balustrade and chandeliers
- Installation of new roof, floors and a moveable stage extension
- Installation of new high-specification sound, heating, lighting and air-conditioning systems
- Upgrade of toilet facilities
- New five-storey extension at the rear of the building, providing modern dressing rooms, education suites, meeting and administration facilities and the offices of the Ulster Orchestra
- New box office facilities
- Restoration of Joseph Carey's paintings of Belfast scenes (see above) and development of new dedicated new gallery space for their display
- New interpretative display telling the history of the hall
- Conversion of the adjoining minor hall (formerly the Group Theatre) into circulation space, bar and café

The refurbishment was performed by Graham Building Contractors and was jointly funded by Belfast City Council, the Department of Culture, Arts and Leisure, the Heritage Lottery Fund and the Arts Council of Northern Ireland. The hall was reopened with a gala event on 6 March 2009.

Previously stated as 1,850, the seated capacity of the refurbished hall is 1,000.

== In popular culture ==
The Ulster Hall served as the eleventh "Pit Stop" during the 22nd season of The Amazing Race.
