= Get Gellar =

- Dexter episode
- Episode no.: Season 6 Episode 9
- Directed by: Seith Mann
- Written by: Karen Campbell
- Cinematography by: Romeo Tirone
- Editing by: Michael Ruscio
- Original release date: November 27, 2011
- Running time: 50 minutes

Guest appearances
- Colin Hanks as Travis Marshall (special guest star); Edward James Olmos as James Gellar (special guest star); Geoff Pierson as Thomas Matthews; Aimee Garcia as Jamie Batista; Billy Brown as Mike Anderson; Josh Cooke as Louis Greene; Kyle Davis as Steve Dorsey; Rya Kihlstedt as Dr. Michelle Ross; Alex Hyde-White as Trent Casey

Episode chronology
← Previous "Sin of Omission"	Next → "Ricochet Rabbit"
- Dexter season 6

"Get Gellar" is the ninth episode of the sixth season of the American crime drama television series Dexter. It is the 69th overall episode of the series and was written by Karen Campbell, and directed by Seith Mann. It originally aired on Showtime on November 27, 2011.

Set in Miami, the series centers on Dexter Morgan, a forensic technician specializing in bloodstain pattern analysis for the fictional Miami Metro Police Department, who leads a secret parallel life as a vigilante serial killer, hunting down murderers who have not been adequately punished by the justice system due to corruption or legal technicalities. In the episode, Dexter and Travis team up to track Gellar, while Debra pushes against LaGuerta's orders in re-opening a case.

According to Nielsen Media Research, the episode was seen by an estimated 1.89 million household viewers and gained a 0.9 ratings share among adults aged 18–49. The episode received mixed reviews from critics, with many considering the twist ending predictable and anticlimactic.

== Plot ==
After releasing Travis (Colin Hanks), Dexter (Michael C. Hall) gets him to stay at a hotel while he searches for Gellar (Edward James Olmos). He finds the word "2LOT" in a painting, referring to the second law of thermodynamics. He finds a connection between that and an atheist professor, Trent Casey (Alex Hyde-White), a dark parody of Richard Dawkins, deducing that he will be Gellar's next victim.

Angel (David Zayas) visits Quinn (Desmond Harrington), after learning that he proposed to a stripper the previous night. They realize he left his cellphone and gun with the woman, so they are forced to visit her. However, it is revealed that Quinn was hitting on the woman's mother, who worked at a waffle house, and they proceed to leave with his gun and cellphone. When the call girl's father wants justice for his daughter's case, Debra (Jennifer Carpenter) informs LaGuerta (Lauren Vélez) that she will re-open the case against her wishes. This prompts LaGuerta to meet with Matthews (Geoff Pierson), who is revealed to be the man who hired the call girl, but left the scene as he feared his career would be ruined.

Dexter and Travis follow Gellar to Casey's office, but Casey has already been kidnapped. Later, the police are called when his body is found on the campus. As Masuka (C. S. Lee) moves the body, it sets off a trap that drops blood all over them. Knowing that Gellar has updated his blog entries, Dexter gets Travis to send a message in his blog, hoping it will lead to a meeting. Travis is targeted by Gellar, who leaves a bloodied message in his wall asking him to bring "the false prophet", as well as leaving Casey's hand. He tells Dexter that Gellar wants to meet him, but does not tell him about the message. Louis (Josh Cooke) helps Miami Metro in tracking the IP address of Gellar's blog, putting the church within the radar. Later, he has sex with Jamie (Aimee Garcia) in his apartment, where it is revealed that he is the one who bought the Ice Truck Killer's prosthetic hand.

Dexter and Travis arrive at the church, with Dexter sneaking in while Travis enters to meet Gellar in the entrance. Gellar wants Travis to repent for his actions, and then hugs him. As Dexter inspects the church, he discovers Travis unconscious, as well as a secret passageway leading to the basement. He descends to find Gellar, only finding a freezer. When he opens it, he is astonished to discover the frozen corpse of Gellar, who was dead the whole time. As Dexter realizes that Travis hallucinated Gellar as his Dark Passenger, Travis is revealed to be awake, and grabs a sword as he approaches the basement.

== Production ==
=== Development ===
The episode was written by Karen Campbell, and directed by Seith Mann. This was Campbell's second writing credit, and Mann's first directing credit.

== Reception ==
=== Viewers ===
In its original American broadcast, "Get Gellar" was seen by an estimated 1.89 million household viewers with a 0.9 in the 18–49 demographics. This means that 0.9 percent of all households with televisions watched the episode. This was a 8% decrease in viewership from the previous episode, which was watched by an estimated 2.05 million household viewers with a 1.0 in the 18–49 demographics.

=== Critical reviews ===
"Get Gellar" received mixed reviews. Matt Fowler of IGN gave the episode a "good" 7 out of 10, and wrote, "Nine episodes. We spent nine episodes watching this show carry this revelation around on its shoulders. So I'm happy that we can spend the final three chapters light of its burden. So, you know, thank heavens it's over. But that didn't help make this episode any less of a chore to watch. It was very frustrating watching Dexter "work" with Travis. And not just because Dexter could have ended this whole thing by ending Travis a few episodes back (the show, bending), sparing a few lives in the process. But because most of us knew what the end of this episode would be so we were just watching "Get Gellar" go through the motions. Plus, why would Dexter ever think Gellar would want to meet Travis back at the church? The place that Gellar and Travis were supposedly caught in? By Dexter? Ugh. Bending."

Joshua Alston of The A.V. Club gave the episode a "D+" grade and wrote, "All season, the writers have pained themselves (and us) figuring out how to keep the secret that Gellar wasn't real, and now after seeing “Get Gellar,” the shockingly inept reveal, it appears all the work was for naught. The real risk in structuring this season this way wasn't the possibility that people would figure out that Gellar wasn't real early on, it was the possibility that people would find out and still not give a shit." Richard Rys of Vulture gave the episode a 3 star rating out of 5 and wrote, "If there's one line that best sums up last night's episode, it's when Travis tells Dexter, “The writing is on the wall.” He's describing the bloody note in his bathroom, of course, but he's also foreshadowing one whopper of an anticlimax, as we wait another hour for what we've suspected — some of us later than others — for much of the season."

Chase Gamradt of BuddyTV wrote, "We're getting near the end of the season and it looks like Dexter is trying to force these twists and turns too much. The same thing happened to Nip/Tuck and look what happened there." Ian Grey of Salon wrote, "So yes, it's been meek, mild, incest-crazed Travis all along. And forget the utter physical impossibility of his crimes; this is Dexter, dude, where logic and geographic implausibility have disappeared like First Amendment rights at an Occupy Wall Street march."

Billy Grifter of Den of Geek wrote, "I know I'm being exceptionally geeky here, but these aren't the type of mistakes that normally appear on this show, so I feel duty-bound to mention them. Now we've got the Gellar question out of the way at last, I'm optimistic that the final three episodes could deliver some real surprises." Matt Richenthal of TV Fanatic gave the episode a 1 star rating out of 5 and wrote, "I will try to be as succinct and as calm about this as possible, but this is simply storytelling at its worst and at its laziest. It's one thing to build toward a surprising reveal that is well-paced and nearly impossible to predict. [...] This season has been about nothing but this surprise. It's been a build-up to a development that everyone saw coming and one that makes it clear the producers are out of ideas."

Claire Zulkey of Los Angeles Times wrote, "If you predicted the twist in tonight's episode, how did realizing you were right make you feel? Pretty smart or slightly let down? I realized that with (A) Everything being as it seemed, and (B) What actually happened, I would have actually preferred (C) Something entirely different that would have caught me completely off-guard. Being right isn't always fun." Television Without Pity gave the episode an "F" grade.
