= Ricochet Rabbit (Dexter) =

- Dexter episode
- Episode no.: Season 6 Episode 10
- Directed by: Michael Lehmann
- Written by: Jace Richdale; Lauren Gussis; Scott Reynolds
- Cinematography by: Romeo Tirone
- Editing by: Louis Cioffi
- Original release date: December 4, 2011
- Running time: 49 minutes

Guest appearances
- Colin Hanks as Travis Marshall (special guest star); Edward James Olmos as James Gellar (special guest star); Aimee Garcia as Jamie Batista; Billy Brown as Mike Anderson; Josh Cooke as Louis Greene; Kyle Davis as Steve Dorsey; Jordana Spiro as Beth Dorsey; Rya Kihlstedt as Dr. Michelle Ross; Elizabeth McLaughlin as Grant's Daughter

Episode chronology
← Previous "Get Gellar"	Next → "Talk to the Hand"
- Dexter season 6

"Ricochet Rabbit" is the tenth episode of the sixth season of the American crime drama television series Dexter. It is the 70th overall episode of the series and was written by co-executive producer Jace Richdale, supervising producer Lauren Gussis, and co-producer Scott Reynolds, and directed by Michael Lehmann. It originally aired on Showtime on December 4, 2011.

Set in Miami, the series centers on Dexter Morgan, a forensic technician specializing in bloodstain pattern analysis for the fictional Miami Metro Police Department, who leads a secret parallel life as a vigilante serial killer, hunting down murderers who have not been adequately punished by the justice system due to corruption or legal technicalities. In the episode, Dexter tries to find Travis, who has now convinced a couple to help him in his mission.

According to Nielsen Media Research, the episode was seen by an estimated 1.87 million household viewers and gained a 0.9 ratings share among adults aged 18–49. The episode received mixed reviews from critics, who questioned the logic and actions of the characters.

== Plot ==
As Dexter (Michael C. Hall) inspects Gellar's body, he is locked in the basement by Travis (Colin Hanks). Through the window, he witnesses Travis having a conversation with an hallucination of Gellar (Edward James Olmos), who reminds Travis that he killed him by showing his wound. He also states that Travis was the one who stole the sword from the university, and Gellar took the blame for him. Travis subsequently leaves, deciding he will find someone else to help him in his mission.

With Miami Metro closing in the church, Dexter escapes and uses Gellar's hand to plant fingerprints over the area. He then uses his blog to declare that he gives up on his mission, hoping to lure Travis. During this, Travis meets with Steve (Kyle Davis) and Beth Dorsey (Jordana Spiro), a religious and fanatic couple who frequented Gellar's blog. Together, they kidnap Holly Benson, the previous Whore of Babylon victim whom he let go, planning to use her as the next tableau, which revolves around the Wormwood.

Louis (Josh Cooke), who admires Dexter, shows him a demo of a video game he created where players can choose to become a specific serial killer, which includes the Bay Harbor Butcher. Dexter expresses disgust with the game, upsetting Louis. As Quinn (Desmond Harrington) continues engaging into his drunk behavior, Angel (David Zayas) is forced to investigate the cases on his own. Debra (Jennifer Carpenter) is approached by Matthews (Geoff Pierson) over the call girl case, and is confused why he cares deeply about it. Subsequently, she discovers that it was Matthews who was with the call girl during her death. She also consults with her therapist over her new behavior, as she feels she relies too much on her brother after reacting to a crime scene in the church.

Dexter tracks Holly's location to a yacht, where Travis and the Dorseys have prepared a Wormwood poison. He kills Steve, but finds no sign of Travis or the poison. Angel visits Beth at her house to talk over Steve's activity in Gellar's blog. As he leaves, he discovers a shelf devoted to Gellar's works. Before he can react, he is knocked unconscious by Travis, who decides they should drop the poison in Miami Metro. Back at the yacht, Dexter finds Holly's corpse and argues with Harry (James Remar) over interfering. Suddenly, he discovers the ingredients for the Wormwood poison, which is lethal for humans. Realizing the poison gas is ready to be released, he is forced to abandon Harry's Code and calls the police to report the yacht's location, as well as the poison threat.

== Production ==
=== Development ===
The episode was written by co-executive producer Jace Richdale, supervising producer Lauren Gussis, and co-producer Scott Reynolds, and directed by Michael Lehmann. This was Richdale's second writing credit, Gussis' ninth writing credit, Reynolds' seventh writing credit, and Lehmann's first directing credit.

== Reception ==
=== Viewers ===
In its original American broadcast, "Ricochet Rabbit" was seen by an estimated 1.87 million household viewers with a 0.9 in the 18–49 demographics. This means that 0.9 percent of all households with televisions watched the episode. This was a slight decrease in viewership from the previous episode, which was watched by an estimated 1.89 million household viewers with a 0.9 in the 18–49 demographics.

=== Critical reviews ===
"Ricochet Rabbit" received mixed reviews. Matt Fowler of IGN gave the episode a "good" 7 out of 10, and wrote, "As good as it felt to actually hear Dexter say "I've made a terrible mistake," almost channeling Gob Bluth, "Ricochet Rabbit" was a very mixed bag of an episode that offered up a few, new cool elements amidst a sea of dumb dialogue and forced plot movement. This was a huge "2+2=5" episode where very few character choices made sense and most everything seemed shoe-horned in to move the story along to where the writers wanted it to go, rather than hold true to the characters themselves."

Joshua Alston of The A.V. Club gave the episode a "C–" grade and wrote, "The good news about hitting rock bottom is that there's nowhere to go but up. So the silver lining around “Get Gellar” is that after weeks of coming to this space to challenge the fundamental viability of Dexter as a television show, I can now offer a little praise, even if it's of the extremely faint variety. “Ricochet Rabbit” isn't the worst episode of Dexter I've ever seen, because that position was filled last week. It was, however, still a deeply inept hour of television that boggled my mind, and did nothing to dissuade me from swearing off Dexter after this season wraps up." Richard Rys of Vulture wrote, "With that, Dexter breaks his own code and calls 911 to report the Wormwood evidence scene. We'll see if that ends up being another lousy decision, though at this point, Dexter could probably give homicide Travis's precise coordinates and they'd still find a way to lose him."

Chase Gamradt of BuddyTV wrote, "After last week's "shock ending" this episode seemed very anticlimactic. You can't expect much from a show that ends 15 minutes early because it is running out of steam." Ian Grey of Salon wrote, "“Ricochet Rabbit” is a flat-out superior Dexter episode that multitasks as an critique of an entire season's worth of mistakes, missteps and misconceptions. Directed by Michael Lehmann with wit, pacing and a deep feel for inner Big Bads, it's Dexter pared to primal basics."

Billy Grifter of Den of Geek wrote, "Season six has been somewhat lumpy in places, but I'm optimistic that as we reach the end of the season there's going to be some surprises that I can't predict, or even guess." Matt Richenthal of TV Fanatic gave the episode a 4.1 star rating out of 5 and wrote, "Having already outlined my problems with the season in general last Sunday, I went into this outing with a clean slate, happy to give what has long been one of my favorite shows a fresh start for its final three episodes of the year."

Claire Zulkey of Los Angeles Times wrote, "Tonight's episode just felt messy compared with the best Dexter's been, slack where it should have been taut and ridiculous when previously I've been willing to go along for the ride." Television Without Pity gave the episode a "D" grade.
