= A Horse of a Different Color =

- Dexter episode
- Episode no.: Season 6 Episode 4
- Directed by: John Dahl
- Written by: Lauren Gussis
- Cinematography by: Romeo Tirone
- Editing by: Louis Cioffi
- Original release date: October 23, 2011
- Running time: 52 minutes

Guest appearances
- Colin Hanks as Travis Marshall (special guest star); Mos Def as Brother Sam (special guest star); Edward James Olmos as James Gellar (special guest star); Geoff Pierson as Tom Matthews; Aimee Garcia as Jamie Batista; Billy Brown as Mike Anderson

Episode chronology
← Previous "Smokey and the Bandit"	Next → "The Angel of Death"
- Dexter season 6

"A Horse of a Different Color" is the fourth episode of the sixth season of the American crime drama television series Dexter. It is the 64th overall episode of the series and was written by supervising producer Lauren Gussis, and was directed by John Dahl. It originally aired on Showtime on October 23, 2011.

Set in Miami, the series centers on Dexter Morgan, a forensic technician specializing in bloodstain pattern analysis for the fictional Miami Metro Police Department, who leads a secret parallel life as a vigilante serial killer, hunting down murderers who have not been adequately punished by the justice system due to corruption or legal technicalities. In the episode, Miami Metro finds a new serial killer, while Travis begins to deviate from Gellar's plans.

According to Nielsen Media Research, the episode was seen by an estimated 1.89 million household viewers and gained a 0.9 ratings share among adults aged 18–49. The episode received generally positive reviews from critics, who praised the performances and themes, but criticizing the characterization and CGI.

== Plot ==
Miami Metro investigates the appearance of the four horses, as each one carried a mannequin with Nathan's dismembered body parts. They find another symbol of Alpha and Omega as well as four numbers, which were also found in Omar Rivera's murder, and they realize they are after the same killer. Mike Anderson (Billy Brown) theorizes that the horses resemble the Four Horsemen of the Apocalypse.

LaGuerta (Lauren Vélez) is not thrilled that Matthews (Geoff Pierson) wants Debra (Jennifer Carpenter) to oversee all press hearings, so she gets her to attend therapy for the restaurant shooting. As Mike discovers that there might be "tableaus" involved, Dexter discovers that the murders and numbers were all five days apart. While they work on what his next move might be, Debra decides to name the killer as the "Doomsday Killer." At a café, Travis (Colin Hanks) and Gellar (Edward James Olmos) discuss their strategy, but Travis is distracted by the waitress, Erin (Jamie Silberhartz), whom he likes. Travis abandons Gellar later to go on a date with Erin, which culminates with sex. The following day, Travis is horrified to find that Gellar has kidnapped Erin, demanding that he focuses on his mission.

As Dexter investigates the Doomsday Killer, he also talks with Brother Sam (Mos Def) over the case, and how the killer uses God as an excuse to kill. During this, Dexter realizes that the amount of work in the murders suggests two serial killers. Harrison is reported sick, and a doctor states that he needs surgery for his appendix. After talking with Brother Sam, Dexter prays to God for his son's safety. Masuka continues his relationship with Ryan (Brea Grant), realizing that she shares the same interests as him. However, Masuka is informed that a prosthetic hand from the Ice Truck Killer has gone on auction on a website. He tries to buy it back, but is already sold. Ryan confirms she did it to pay her rent, and Masuka is forced to fire her.

During her press conference, Debra accidentally uses profanity, and LaGuerta believes this will disrupt her career. However, the public approves of Debra's carefree personality, delighting Matthews. Dexter is relieved when Harrison's surgery is successful. Miami Metro gains a list of possible suspects, including Gellar himself. Gellar was a religious studies professor who vanished three years prior after being fired for stealing a sword. They are then summoned to a botanical garden, where Erin is bound. When someone accidentally touches a wire, a trap kills Erin to display her as the Angel of Death, while locusts are released. As Dexter leaves, he notices Travis watching the scene, and deduces he could be one of the Doomsday Killers.

== Production ==
The episode was written by supervising producer Lauren Gussis, and was directed by John Dahl. This was Gussis' eighth writing credit, and Dahl's ninth directing credit.

== Reception ==
=== Viewers ===
In its original American broadcast, "A Horse of a Different Color" was seen by an estimated 1.89 million household viewers with a 0.9 in the 18–49 demographics. This means that 0.9 percent of all households with televisions watched the episode. This was a 26% increase in viewership from the previous episode, which was watched by an estimated 1.50 million household viewers with a 0.7 in the 18–49 demographics.

=== Critical reviews ===
"A Horse of a Different Color" received generally positive reviews. Matt Fowler of IGN gave the episode a "great" 8.5 out of 10, and wrote, "And so after a few episodes that featured Dexter learning lessons that I felt he'd already learned a few times over, "A Horse Of A Different Color" kicked things up a notch by having Dexter officially begin tracking down the Doomsday Killer. Yes, the gross-tacular side story involving Colin Hanks and Edward James Olmos got into the official game this week after the Miami Metro team discovered the ridiculously awful HorseNatahan of the Apocalypse. It was so freakin' bonkers that it even made Dexter leap back a bit. Could it be that this kind of demented s*** doesn't really float Dexter's boat the way it used to? Could this be actual evolution?"

Joshua Alston of The A.V. Club gave the episode a "C" grade and wrote, "“A Horse Of A Different Color” was a complete departure from that vision. There was no kill-of-the week in sight, just character beats with Dexter's ongoing exploration of faith and the usual Miami Metro shenanigans going on in the background." Richard Rys of Vulture wrote, "Shame on us non-believers who were tired of all the teasin' and not enough pleasin' so far. Act one is over, and now the race between Dexter and Deb to catch the Doomsday Killers is on (as usual, Dexter has a big lead, especially since he saw Travis looking all enraptured at the crime scene)."

Chase Gamradt of BuddyTV wrote, "Take out the terrible CGI locusts and the Saw-influenced killing, this episode was pretty good, and I can't wait until Dexter learns more about the Doomsday killers." Ian Grey of Salon wrote, "And so ends another episode that continues the Season 6 mystery of a show that finds God everywhere but ultimately, only pays lip service to the passions of the people talking about Him."

Billy Grifter of Den of Geek wrote, "There was only one fatality this week, and Dexter killed nobody. Given the history of the show, I'm certain that low a body count can't continue for long. And, the Doomsday Killer(s) are also going to have their work cut out, because coming up soon they've got to deliver a “Two hundred million lion-headed cavalry”, according to the Bible. I think Dexter is about to get crazy." Matt Richenthal of TV Fanatic gave the episode a 3.8 star rating out of 5 and wrote, "Dexter took a rather big leap in logic to close out “A Horse of a Different Color” this week. Considering his tutelage at the warped hands of Professor Gellar, along with the fear that man clearly instills in him, it seems hard to believe that Travis would just stand admiringly outside of his most recent crime scene. He might as well have sent the Miami PD a text message with his name and address."

Claire Zulkey of Los Angeles Times wrote, "I like the play of dark and light sides this season: Sam could ostensibly be a spiritual version of Dexter, but Travis could also turn out to be the bizarro Brother Sam. I think Dexter feels some sort of strange affinity for Travis: Dexter's obviously titillated by the “tableaus” the Doomsday Killer set up and seems practically nostalgic for the meticulous scenes left behind by his brother, the Ice Truck Killer." Television Without Pity gave the episode a "B" grade.
