= Dexter season 6 =

Drama series

Dexter
- Season 6
- DVD cover
- Showrunner: Scott Buck
- Starring: Michael C. Hall; Jennifer Carpenter; Desmond Harrington; C. S. Lee; Lauren Vélez; David Zayas; James Remar
- No. of episodes: 12

Release
- Original network: Showtime
- Original release: October 2 – December 18, 2011

Season chronology
- ← Previous; Season 5 Next → Season 7

The sixth season of Dexter premiered on October 2, 2011, on the television cable network Showtime, and consisted of 12 episodes. The season follows Dexter's and Miami Metro's investigations into a string of bizarre ritualistic killings featuring overtly religious apocalyptic symbolism. In contrast to the previous five seasons, Season 6 was met with negative reviews. On November 18, 2011, it was announced that Dexter had been renewed for two more seasons.

== Plot ==
Angel Batista's younger sister Jamie has become Harrison's babysitter, and Dexter Morgan and Debra visit a Catholic pre-school in hopes of signing Harrison up. Meanwhile, María LaGuerta is promoted to Captain after blackmailing Deputy Chief Matthews, whose name was on a prostitute's ledger. Vince Masuka is teaching a group of forensic science students, and after his first choice faints at a crime scene, he asks an attractive female student, Ryan Chambers, to become his intern. Masuka eventually fires Ryan when she steals a painted prosthetic hand from the Ice Truck Killer crime scenes, which shows up on an internet auction site. Masuka quickly hires another intern, video game designer and computer programmer Louis Greene, to fix the problem. Greene claims he made the auction page vanish, but was unable to get the hand back.

LaGuerta and Batista have divorced, but try to remain friends; this is further complicated by Matthews' decision to promote Debra to LaGuerta's vacant lieutenant position instead of Batista. Batista thinks he was passed over due to the feud between Matthews and LaGuerta. LaGuerta continuously thwarts Debra's attempts to make a good first impression as the new lieutenant by giving her the wrong advice; however, Debra makes an independent decision to hire Mike Anderson as her replacement, against LaGuerta's recommendation.

Joey Quinn proposes to Debra, but she refuses and they break up. Shortly after, Quinn learns of Deb's promotion and surmises that it was her reason for ending their relationship. Quinn begins a long pattern of barhopping, drunkenness, and one-night stands; his unprofessional behavior angers and ultimately endangers Batista, his new partner.

A new threat appears in Miami in the form of the Doomsday Killers (or DDK), Professor James Gellar and his student Travis Marshall, who seek to bring about the end of the world through killings based on the Book of Revelation. They leave signs of the Apocalypse including the Alpha and Omega or the Four Horsemen as a cryptic tableau at each crime scene. Meanwhile, Dexter learns of Brother Sam, a former drug addict and murderer who repented and became a minister. He operates a body shop where he employs other ex-convicts, to lead them to crime-free lives.

Initially believing Sam to be behind the first Doomsday Killer murder, Dexter decides to kill Sam but is quickly proven wrong and finds himself befriending him. However, Brother Sam is murdered by Nick, one of his trusted ex-convicts. Before dying, Brother Sam implores Dexter to forgive his assailant. After confronting Nick, who admits to intentionally killing Brother Sam and laughing that his crime will never be found out, Dexter goes against Brother Sam's wish and strangles Nick to death.

Dexter learns that the Trinity Killer's wife and daughter have been found dead in Nebraska, which Jonah Mitchell reports was the work of his father, Arthur Mitchell. Dexter, the only person who knows the Trinity Killer is dead, suspects that Jonah is following in his father's footsteps and goes to Nebraska to kill Jonah, encouraged by a vision of his brother, Brian Moser, the Ice Truck Killer. However, after confronting Jonah, Dexter learns that his sister committed suicide and Jonah killed his mother in a fit of rage, and wants to die out of guilt. Dexter decides to forgive Jonah and leaves him alive to deal with his demons.

Dexter's investigation of the Doomsday Killers leads him to Travis Marshall. Travis says that all he has done was at the request of Professor Gellar, so Dexter asks Travis to help him kill the professor, thinking if he can save Travis then he can save himself. However, Dexter eventually discovers that Professor Gellar had been killed by Travis three years ago and now exists only in the latter's mind. Travis marks Dexter as "the Beast" and tries to kill him in one of his tableaux, the Lake of Fire, but Dexter escapes and is saved by a passing migrant boat. Finally, Travis kidnaps Dexter's son to use as a sacrifice in his final tableau, thinking that "the Beast" is dead. Dexter rescues Harrison and knocks Travis unconscious. He takes Travis back to the church where Travis carried out his earlier murders, which Dexter has set up as a kill room.

Meanwhile, Jamie starts dating Louis Greene. Greene wants to impress the police force, especially Dexter, and is revealed to have acquired the prosthetic hand from the Ice Truck Killer case, which he mails to Dexter to mess with him after he badmouths a game about serial killers Louis is designing. Debra refuses to yield to pressure to close the case of the overdose death of a prostitute, eventually discovering that Deputy Chief Matthews was present when the woman died. Matthews is forced to retire after LaGuerta leaks the information. Finally, Debra attends department-ordered therapy sessions after being involved in a shoot-out. During her sessions, she begins to realize that she may have romantic feelings for Dexter. She goes to the church (she knew Dexter was doing forensics there) but winds up walking in on him just as he plunges a knife into Travis' chest, to which Dexter responds, "Oh God".

== Cast ==
=== Main ===
- Michael C. Hall as Dexter Morgan
- Jennifer Carpenter as Debra Morgan
- Desmond Harrington as Joey Quinn
- C. S. Lee as Vince Masuka
- Lauren Vélez as María LaGuerta
- David Zayas as Angel Batista
- James Remar as Harry Morgan

=== Recurring cast ===
- Aimee Garcia as Jamie Batista
- Billy Brown as Mike Anderson
- Josh Cooke as Louis Greene
- Rya Kihlstedt as Dr. Michelle Ross
- Lacey Beeman as Holly Benson
- Germaine De Leon as Nick
- Geoff Pierson as Deputy Chief Tom Matthews
- Brea Grant as Ryan Chambers
- Molly Parker as Lisa Marshall
- Christian Camargo as Brian Moser
- Mariana Klaveno as Clarissa Porter
- Brando Eaton as Jonah Mitchell

=== Special guest stars ===
- Colin Hanks as Travis Marshall
- Edward James Olmos as Professor James Gellar
- Mos Def as Brother Sam (credited as Mos)

=== Guest cast ===
- Kyle Davis as Steve Dorsey
- Jordana Spiro as Beth Dorsey
- John Brotherton as Joe Walker
- Kristen Miller as Trisha Billings
- Ronny Cox as Walter Kenney
- Jamie Silberhartz as Erin Baer
- W. Morgan Sheppard as Father Nicholas Galway

== Episodes ==
No. overall	No. in season	Title	Directed by	Written by	Original release date	U.S. viewers (millions)
61	1	"Those Kinds of Things"	John Dahl	Scott Buck	October 2, 2011	2.19
Dexter attends his 20-year high school reunion, hunting his next victim, who was a popular classmate. He begins contemplating the value of religion when Harrison has the chance to attend a Catholic pre-school. LaGuerta, now divorced from Batista, is promoted to captain. Batista is temporarily named lieutenant and hopes to get the job permanently. Debra becomes an unexpected hero when a gunman enters a restaurant where she and Quinn are dining, interrupting Quinn's attempt to propose to her. A murder featuring strange religious symbolism gets the attention of Miami Metro Homicide; the killers, as yet unknown, are two men who seem to be a master and a student.
62	2	"Once Upon a Time..."	SJ Clarkson	Tim Schlattmann	October 9, 2011	1.71
Quinn proposes to Debra, and she turns him down. Dexter meets Brother Sam, an ex-con turned minister who helps other ex-cons start a new life. Dexter suspects Brother Sam is still a criminal, but eventually realizes he was wrong. Meanwhile, Debra is officially promoted over Batista to lieutenant at Miami Metro Homicide. One of the religious murderers shown in the previous episode attacks a male runner in the woods.
63	3	"Smokey and the Bandit"	Stefan Schwartz	Manny Coto	October 16, 2011	1.50
Dexter becomes intrigued with the murder of a prostitute when details of the crime remind him of an unsolved serial killer case from the 1980s. Debra faces the challenges of her new position as LaGuerta tries to thwart her by giving her poor advice. The religious murderers try to force the kidnapped runner from the previous episode to repent for his sins.
64	4	"A Horse of a Different Color"	John Dahl	Lauren Gussis	October 23, 2011	1.89
The religious murderers stage a spectacular crime scene recalling the Book of Revelation, using pieces of the runner’s corpse sewn to pieces from mannequins to form the Four Horsemen of the Apocalypse. The police department officially starts to chase the "Doomsday Killer". Meanwhile, Harrison needs emergency surgery, which forces Dexter to reconsider his views about faith with the help of Brother Sam.
65	5	"The Angel of Death"	SJ Clarkson	Scott Reynolds	October 30, 2011	1.80
Miami Homicide starts investigating Professor James Gellar. Dexter examines the angel wings from Doomsday Killers' most recent killing and finds that a unique glue was used to attach a piece of the wing, which leads him to Travis Marshall, who works with rare books at a museum. Masuka hires a new intern, Louis Greene, who helps him with the missing evidence from the Ice Truck Killer case. Deb moves out of Dexter's apartment and gets her own place. After Travis fails to capture a "Whore of Babylon" on his own, he and Gellar kidnap a woman together, in preparation for the next tableau. Dexter tries to kill Travis, but later decides that Gellar is the one he must kill. An unknown man shoots Brother Sam in his shop.
66	6	"Just Let Go"	John Dahl	Jace Richdale	November 6, 2011	1.98
Brother Sam is found at his shop alive and is taken to the hospital. Dexter initially suspects a gang member, but later realizes the shooter was Nick, one of Brother Sam's ex-con employees. Meanwhile, Miami Metro calls Professor Gellar's former assistant in for further questioning, and learn of his obsession with an old cult who sought to bring about the apocalypse by performing ritualistic sacrifices as depicted in Gellar's notes. Elsewhere, Travis begins to feel conflicted, eventually releasing the woman he and Geller abducted and held as "Whore of Babylon". Debra holds a house-warming party, which is crashed by a drunk Quinn.
67	7	"Nebraska"	Romeo Tirone	Wendy West	November 13, 2011	1.99
Dexter disposes of Nick's body in the ocean after having drowned him in the previous episode. Debra faces scrutiny because her department's case clearance rate is low. Dexter finds out that Rebecca and Sally Mitchell (the daughter and wife of the Trinity Killer) have been killed, which son Jonah blames on his father (who only Dexter knows is dead). He drives to Nebraska to confront Jonah, who reveals that his mother blamed her children for their father's actions, causing Rebecca to commit suicide; following this, Jonah beat his mother to death in anger. Dexter lets Jonah live, telling him to forgive himself. Meanwhile, back in Miami, Masuka and his new intern find a lead related to Doomsday. Travis tells Gellar that he is done working for God and moves in with his sister.
68	8	"Sin of Omission"	Ernest Dickerson	Arika Lisanne Mittman	November 20, 2011	2.05
Dexter, using what he's learned from Brother Sam, persuades Travis to help him get Gellar, but Travis is kidnapped by Gellar for further rituals. Meanwhile, Debra and LaGuerta go head-to-head after a call girl ends up dead when LaGuerta wants Deb to stop the investigation. After Debra interrogates Travis's sister as part of the DDK investigation, the sister is found dead, posed as the "Whore of Babylon". Batista has dinner with Jamie and Louis, but doesn't take too kindly to Louis dating his sister. Also, Quinn takes Masuka on a night on the town to a strip club, where Quinn gets extremely drunk again and asks a stripper to marry him.
69	9	"Get Gellar"	Seith Mann	Karen Campbell	November 27, 2011	1.89
Dexter attempts to stay ahead of Miami Metro Homicide on his hunt for Gellar, who plans on killing a radical atheist professor, but Dexter fails to stop him after he gets trapped in an elevator. Batista helps Quinn recover his gun that he left in the car of a one-night stand. Dexter later discovers the frozen corpse of Professor Gellar in a freezer in the abandoned church basement and realizes Travis was the sole killer all along; the Professor Gellar that Travis interacted with is actually his dark passenger. Jamie and Louis take a step further in their relationship. LaGuerta meets with Chief Matthews to tell him Debra won't back off on investigating who was with the call girl who overdosed.
70	10	"Ricochet Rabbit"	Michael Lehmann	Jace Richdale & Lauren Gussis & Scott Reynolds	December 4, 2011	1.87
Travis teams up with a religious and fanatic couple, named Adam and Beth Dorsey, whom he met via Gellar's blog, to kill Holly Benson (the former Whore of Babylon whom he let go) and to unleash the next tableau, Wormwood, a poison which Travis re-imagines as poison gas. Dexter tries to get one step ahead of the Doomsday Killers and figure out where their next victim could possibly be before they attack again. Meanwhile, Debra begins to realize she relies too much on her brother after reacting to a crime scene.
71	11	"Talk to the Hand"	Ernest Dickerson	Manny Coto & Tim Schlattmann	December 11, 2011	1.92
Travis tasks Beth with unleashing Wormwood poison gas in the Miami Metro squad room, but she's stopped by Dexter, saving everyone's life. Debra has dinner with Chief Matthews where she confronts him about being implicated in the dead call girl case. When Matthews is forced to retire, she realizes that LaGuerta has been manipulating her throughout the case. Dexter stages a fake Doomsday Killer tableau in order to draw out Travis, but is captured himself and becomes a part in the final tableau, the "Lake of Fire". Debra's therapist prompts her to consider whether she may actually be in love with her adopted brother.
72	12	"This is the Way the World Ends"	John Dahl	Scott Buck & Wendy West	December 18, 2011	2.23
Dexter is rescued by a boat of illegal immigrants. Debra dispatches officers to skyscrapers in downtown Miami on a hunch that this is where the final tableau will be executed. Travis sees that the police have found his hideout, so he retreats to Dexter's apartment. Realizing that Harrison is Dexter's son, Travis kidnaps Harrison to use him as his sacrificial lamb in his final act to bring about the end of the world, but is stopped by Dexter who knocks him out, but does not kill him. Dexter takes the unconscious Travis to the abandoned church, where he kills him. Debra, checking in on Dexter at the church, discovers her brother's shocking secret.

== Reception ==
According to Metacritic, the sixth season of Dexter received "generally favorable" reviews with a score of 62 out of 100 based on 10 critic reviews. 38% of 26 reviews on Rotten Tomatoes are positive and its consensus states: "Heavy-handed symbolism, an unimpressive villain, and a redundant arc for America's favorite serial killer all conspire to make Dexter's sixth season its worst yet."

Martin Chilton of The Daily Telegraph gave the first episode of season 6 a score of 1.5 / 5, writing that "With each season, the quality of a show that once won an Emmy nomination and a Golden Globe for Hall has been sliding."

R.L. Shaffer of IGN wrote of the season that "while this season saw a few new twists and turns...it also handed us a fairly hammy story that tied Dexter to an apocalyptic serial killer." However he goes on to write that "even in its weak moments, Dexter is a fascinating show to watch" and that "the subtle seeds of the show's ultimate conclusion...planted throughout season six, are not only compelling, but the real reason to keep watching."
