= Sin of Omission (Dexter) =

- Dexter episode
- Episode no.: Season 6 Episode 8
- Directed by: Ernest Dickerson
- Written by: Arika Lisanne Mittman
- Cinematography by: Romeo Tirone
- Editing by: Keith Henderson
- Original release date: November 20, 2011
- Running time: 52 minutes

Guest appearances
- Colin Hanks as Travis Marshall (special guest star); Edward James Olmos as James Gellar (special guest star); Aimee Garcia as Jamie Batista; Billy Brown as Mike Anderson; Molly Parker as Lisa Marshall; Josh Cooke as Louis Greene; Rya Kihlstedt as Dr. Michelle Ross; W. Morgan Sheppard as Nicholas Galway

Episode chronology
← Previous "Nebraska"	Next → "Get Gellar"
- Dexter season 6

"Sin of Omission" is the eighth episode of the sixth season of the American crime drama television series Dexter. It is the 68th overall episode of the series and was written by Arika Lisanne Mittman, and directed by Ernest Dickerson. It originally aired on Showtime on November 20, 2011.

Set in Miami, the series centers on Dexter Morgan, a forensic technician specializing in bloodstain pattern analysis for the fictional Miami Metro Police Department, who leads a secret parallel life as a vigilante serial killer, hunting down murderers who have not been adequately punished by the justice system due to corruption or legal technicalities. In the episode, Dexter tries to get Travis to help him find Gellar, while Debra wonders why LaGuerta wants to close a case.

According to Nielsen Media Research, the episode was seen by an estimated 2.05 million household viewers and gained a 1.0 ratings share among adults aged 18–49. The episode received mixed reviews from critics, who criticized the pacing and writing of the episode.

== Plot ==
Following his trip to Nebraska, Dexter (Michael C. Hall) returns to Miami, apologizing to Debra (Jennifer Carpenter) for his absence. He later attends Brother Sam's funeral service, where he is surprised to realize that he left him his own Bible.

Gellar (Edward James Olmos) continues stalking Travis (Colin Hanks), suggesting he could use Lisa (Molly Parker) as the new Whore of Babylon. Travis is later visited by Dexter in the museum, having learned that he let the woman, Holly Benson, go. Dexter offers to help him, but Travis refuses, as he is scared of what Gellar could do. Using Sam's Bible, Dexter gets Travis to help him by using the idea of sin of omission. Travis accepts to help him, but wants to make sure Lisa will be protected. He tries to avoid the police, but is knocked unconscious by Gellar when he visits Lisa.

Miami Metro investigates the case of a call girl who died after using drugs and hitting her head, with Dexter and Masuka (C. S. Lee) finding evidence that someone else might be involved. To Debra's surprise, LaGuerta (Lauren Vélez) closes the case by deeming it an accidental overdose, and is later seen talking to someone to reassure that it is taken care of. Debra notices Dexter's pen is from Nebraska, and Dexter finally reveals he talked with Jonah Mitchell. Jamie (Aimee Garcia) and Louis (Josh Cooke) have started dating, and Angel (David Zayas) is not content. He reluctantly dines with them to get to know Louis, where he threatens him.

A new Whore of Babylon tableau is discovered, revealing that Lisa is the new victim. Debra finds the connection to Travis, ruling him as one of the potential Doomsday Killer accomplices. Dexter finds a name in the costume and tracks it to Nicholas Galway (W. Morgan Sheppard), a retired priest suffering from dementia. Dexter uses the opportunity to confess to his murders, and Galway absolves him. He discovers that he served at a church, and decides to visit it, ignoring Debra's attempt to have dinner with him. Gellar tortures Travis for abandoning his mission, but is forced to flee when Dexter arrives. Reaching his breaking point, Travis finally agrees to help Dexter.

== Production ==
=== Development ===
The episode was written by Arika Lisanne Mittman, and directed by Ernest Dickerson. This was Mittman's first writing credit, and Dickerson's fifth directing credit.

== Reception ==
=== Viewers ===
In its original American broadcast, "Sin of Omission" was seen by an estimated 2.05 million household viewers with a 1.0 in the 18–49 demographics. This means that 1 percent of all households with televisions watched the episode. This was a slight increase in viewership from the previous episode, which was watched by an estimated 1.99 million household viewers with a 1.0 in the 18–49 demographics.

=== Critical reviews ===
"Sin of Omission" received mixed reviews. Matt Fowler of IGN gave the episode a "good" 7.5 out of 10, and wrote, "Back when Dexter started actually investigating the Doomsday kills, in "A Horse of a Different Color," I was psyched. But then, as you well know, Dexter's whole "catch and release" of Travis at the end of "The Angel of Death" soured me on the whole thing. It felt like a stalling tactic and I just didn't buy it. Now it would be totally possible to wrap up the Doomsday killer storyline before the end of the season, but "Sin of Omission" made it pretty clear that they're going to stretch it out as long as they can."

Joshua Alston of The A.V. Club gave the episode a "C–" grade and wrote, "The one-two punch of “Nebraska” and the renewal announcement left me with a general sense of defeat that hung with me through my viewing of “Sin of Omission.” It's hard not to feel like little if anything that happens between the opening and closing credits is of lasting importance, and that makes it difficult to get excited about watching the show every week. Added to this, Travis & Gellar are still hands down the worst villains Dexter has ever seen, so a piece-moving episode like “Sin of Omission” just feels like an absolute bore, since it's building up to a conclusion that is almost certain to be a disappointment. As unfortunate as “Nebraska” was, at least the road trip gave us a decent break from the Doomsday Duo, but “Sin of Omission” plunged right back into the goofy case, and was all the worse for it." Richard Rys of Vulture wrote, "If you're bored with Dexter's soul searching and a decided lack of kill-room action, you might be a little cranky today. But seeing Travis's sister Lisa wearing a satanic goat mask and riding a multi-headed crocodile should count for something, right?"

Chase Gamradt of BuddyTV wrote, "Not a bad episode, but not a great one. It was a lot of plot building for the big face-off to come." Ian Grey of Salon wrote, "As for this episode, well, it's occasionally quite good, and as anyone who's visited this space knows, “quite good” and “Dexter” are an equation that usually ends with “Debra Morgan”."

Billy Grifter of Den of Geek wrote, "I'm hoping that I'm going to be shocked by the Gellar revelation when we finally get it, but I've put aside a huge groan on the basis that it seems more likely I'll need it." Matt Richenthal of TV Fanatic gave the episode a 3.7 star rating out of 5 and wrote, "I just want to see him set his sights on a target and for obstacles to arise that make that target difficult and dangerous to strap down. Teaming up with Travis and having Gellar make eye contact with Dexter? I think we've arrived at that fun point."

Claire Zulkey of Los Angeles Times wrote, "Maybe it was the letdown from last week's ramble to Nebraska, but tonight's episode felt a little forgettable, like it's just a bridge to when we get closer to Dexter finding (or not finding) the Professor." Television Without Pity gave the episode a "C–" grade.
