= Smokey and the Bandit (Dexter) =

- Dexter episode
- Episode no.: Season 6 Episode 3
- Directed by: Stefan Schwartz
- Written by: Manny Coto
- Cinematography by: Alan Caso
- Editing by: Michael Ruscio
- Original release date: October 16, 2011
- Running time: 50 minutes

Guest appearances
- Colin Hanks as Travis Marshall (special guest star); Mos Def as Brother Sam (special guest star); Edward James Olmos as James Gellar (special guest star); Aimee Garcia as Jamie Batista; Ronny Cox as Walter Kenney; Billy Brown as Mike Anderson; David Monahan as Nathan Roberts; Dianna Miranda as Receptionist

Episode chronology
← Previous "Once Upon a Time"	Next → "A Horse of a Different Color"
- Dexter season 6

"Smokey and the Bandit" is the third episode of the sixth season of the American crime drama television series Dexter. It is the 63rd overall episode of the series and was written by executive producer Manny Coto, and was directed by Stefan Schwartz. It originally aired on Showtime on October 16, 2011.

Set in Miami, the series centers on Dexter Morgan, a forensic technician specializing in bloodstain pattern analysis for the fictional Miami Metro Police Department, who leads a secret parallel life as a vigilante serial killer, hunting down murderers who have not been adequately punished by the justice system due to corruption or legal technicalities. In the episode, Dexter finds a serial killer whom he admired during his youth might have re-emerged, while Debra tries to decide what is best for her new position as Lieutenant.

According to Nielsen Media Research, the episode was seen by an estimated 1.50 million household viewers and gained a 0.7 ratings share among adults aged 18–49. The episode received generally positive reviews from critics, who praised the scenes at Miami Metro, but Dexter's storyline received mixed reactions.

== Plot ==
Miami Metro is called to a crime scene where a prostitute was murdered, with one tooth removed. Dexter (Michael C. Hall) becomes interested in the case when he finds a connection to The Tooth Fairy, a serial killer from his youth in Oregon who operated under a similar modus operandi that was never caught.

Gellar (Edward James Olmos) and Travis (Colin Hanks) get the jogger, Nathan Roberts (David Monahan), chained at the church, demanding that he must repent to God if he wants to be released. He does, but Gellar does not believe it. Later, Nathan escapes from his chains, only to discover a horse in the church. Travis appears and takes him back, where he asks for forgiveness, to which Gellar declares he is ready. Dexter visits a retirement home and befriends a resident from Oregon, Walter Kenney (Ronny Cox), who could be The Tooth Fairy. Dexter complies with Kenney's needs, such as getting him beer and taking him to a storage unit. He also visits Brother Sam (Mos Def), who wants him to come to Nick's baptism to understand his principles.

Debra (Jennifer Carpenter) is worried over her new lieutenant position, especially when she realizes the amount of tasks at her disposal. She must choose a new detective, but LaGuerta (Lauren Vélez) wants a specific officer to get the position. She also has to deal with a drunk Quinn (Desmond Harrington), who has been dating girls since their break-up. Against LaGuerta's instructions, Debra gets Mike Anderson (Billy Brown) promoted to Detective. Masuka (C. S. Lee) flirts with Ryan (Brea Grant) and is surprised when she accepts his invitation to go on a date. Unaware to Masuka, Ryan has taken a prosthetic hand from a victim of the Ice Truck Killer.

Dexter breaks into Kenney's storage unit and discovers human teeth, concluding he is The Tooth Fairy. He is called by Kenney for help, but he is held at gunpoint by Kenney in his car, who discovered Dexter worked at the police. Dexter willingly crashes his car, and then gets Kenney back to his room. Realizing Dexter is also a serial killer, Kenney warns that he is destined to become just like him. Dexter simply suffocates him to death, and takes the human teeth, preventing Kenney from being exposed as The Tooth Fairy. He takes Kenney's blood slide to his apartment, but he accidentally drops the box, disorganizing them. The following day, four horses gallop the streets, displaying Nathan's dismembered body.

== Production ==
=== Development ===
The episode was written by executive producer Manny Coto, and was directed by Stefan Schwartz. This was Coto's fourth writing credit, and Schwartz's first directing credit.

== Reception ==
=== Viewers ===
In its original American broadcast, "Smokey and the Bandit" was seen by an estimated 1.50 million household viewers with a 0.7 in the 18–49 demographics. This means that 0.7 percent of all households with televisions watched the episode. This was a 13% decrease in viewership from the previous episode, which was watched by an estimated 1.71 million household viewers with a 0.9 in the 18–49 demographics.

=== Critical reviews ===
"Smokey and the Bandit" received generally positive reviews. Matt Fowler of IGN gave the episode a "good" 7.5 out of 10, and wrote, "even though I wasn't too crazy about the Walter story, I liked how it left Dexter a bit of a psychological mess. The dropping of the blood slides was a nice touch. I do kind of feel like that box should be a whole lot fuller by now. About how many people has Dexter killed if you include all the off-screen bodies?"

Joshua Alston of The A.V. Club gave the episode a "B" grade and wrote, "I kind of enjoyed the machinations back in the office with an atypically timid Deb struggling to learn on the job while Quinn and LaGuerta try to undermine her at every turn. Throw in Mike Anderson, the handsome new transfer Deb wants to hire despite LaGuerta's warnings, and Masuka's budding romance with Ryan, and it's practically Miami Metro as Seattle Grace. And that worked for me, but again, felt like the version of Dexter that could be a fun show to drop in on every now and again, but certainly not like what I'd expect from a strong pay-cable drama. If there's not a significant amount of traction on the Travis and Father Olmos evil doings next week, I'm going to start to really worry." Richard Rys of Vulture wrote, "Hopefully last night's ending means there's some payoff in store next week. Brother Sam didn't make much noise either, save for asking Dexter to stop by his “company get-together” (who doesn't love a beach-barbecue baptism with a few ex-cons?). In a way, that offer sums up the episode itself: a promising invitation to what we hope is some really good stuff that's yet to come."

Chase Gamradt of BuddyTV wrote, "It looks like Dexter will be dealing with a whole new set of insanity this season, and things are really gearing up for a great hunt." Ian Grey of Salon wrote, "With its third episode this season, "Smokey and the Bandit", the show has reclaimed some of its Gothic texture, with a literally darker image, while cordoning the ill-advised "zany" humor to a single bit of golfing goofiness (don't ask). And our favorite mordantly detached observer of human foibles is back, if not at full force, at least in three-quarter sail."

Billy Grifter of Den of Geek wrote, "So far this season, Dexter is good, but it's yet to deliver any truly jaw-dropping moments. Let's hope that episode four can reverse that trend." Matt Richenthal of TV Fanatic gave the episode a 3 star rating out of 5 and wrote, "So, no, “Smokey and the Bandit” didn't really bring anything together. Clearly, at some point, Travis and Gellar's actions will become the focus of the Miami PD, which will tie in Dexter's arc and Deb's arc and make the series feel like less of an unattached mess."

Claire Zulkey of Los Angeles Times wrote, "It's hard to think about anything else after that gorgeously grotesque finale, but I liked that the episode left a few other questions up in the air. For instance, Brother Sam is trying to get Dexter to attend a baptism of a member of his flock. Is Sam somehow a benevolent, religious version of Dexter?" Television Without Pity gave the episode a "B" grade.
