= Once Upon a Time... (Dexter) =

- Dexter episode
- Episode no.: Season 6 Episode 2
- Directed by: S. J. Clarkson
- Written by: Tim Schlattmann
- Cinematography by: Alan Caso
- Editing by: Keith Henderson
- Original release date: October 9, 2011
- Running time: 53 minutes

Guest appearances
- Colin Hanks as Travis Marshall (special guest star); Mos Def as Brother Sam (special guest star); Edward James Olmos as James Gellar (special guest star); Geoff Pierson as Thomas Matthews; Aimee Garcia as Jamie Batista; Molly Parker as Lisa Marshall; David Monahan as Nathan Roberts

Episode chronology
← Previous "Those Kinds of Things"	Next → "Smokey and the Bandit"
- Dexter season 6

"Once Upon a Time..." is the second episode of the sixth season of the American crime drama television series Dexter. It is the 62nd overall episode of the series and was written by co-executive producer Tim Schlattmann, and was directed by S. J. Clarkson. It originally aired on Showtime on October 9, 2011.

Set in Miami, the series centers on Dexter Morgan, a forensic technician specializing in bloodstain pattern analysis for the fictional Miami Metro Police Department, who leads a secret parallel life as a vigilante serial killer, hunting down murderers who have not been adequately punished by the justice system due to corruption or legal technicalities. In the episode, Dexter is introduced to Brother Sam, an ex-con turned minister who helps other ex-cons start a new life. Meanwhile, Debra receives a promotion, while Gellar seeks Travis' full cooperation.

According to Nielsen Media Research, the episode was seen by an estimated 1.71 million household viewers and gained a 0.9 ratings share among adults aged 18–49. The episode received generally positive reviews from critics, who praised its performances, but felt that the themes were redundant.

== Plot ==
Debra (Jennifer Carpenter) finds an engagement ring in the refrigerator, giving Quinn (Desmond Harrington) to propose to her. However, she turns it down, saying they must wait. While she states she is content with their relationship, Quinn is left disillusioned and asks her to move out of his apartment.

Miami Metro investigates Omar Rivera's murder in the beach, noting he worked at a body shop. They question the shop's owner, Brother Sam (Mos Def), an ex-con turned minister who helps other ex-cons start a new life. Brother Sam is not a suspect, and he considers that everyone can change, but Dexter (Michael C. Hall) is unconvinced. He visits him at his shop, and is told that he killed a man in the past, but religion helped him move forward. Despite LaGuerta (Lauren Vélez) advocating for Angel (David Zayas) to become lieutenant, Matthews (Geoff Pierson) instead gives the position to Debra after her act of heroism at the restaurant goes viral. Debra reluctantly agrees, while Angel and LaGuerta are left disappointed.

While he remains committed to helping Gellar (Edward James Olmos) on his plans, Travis (Colin Hanks) often asks to arrive a few minutes to tend other activities, to Gellar's disappointment. Travis meets with his sister Lisa (Molly Parker) to dine at her house. When he returns to a church they use as their hideout, he finds Gellar awaiting him. He burns his own arm with a hot iron, lamenting Travis' selfishness. A horrified Travis agrees to prioritize their work. Later, they abduct a jogger (David Monahan) to use as their next victim.

Dexter follows Brother Sam at his shop, finding him take a body to his trunk. As he is almost attacked by his dog, he is caught by Brother Sam. He reveals that the body, Nick, is actually alive and he tried to have him killed. Nick's gang arrives to kill Brother Sam, but are forced to leave when Dexter reveals his badge. Nevertheless, Dexter finds that the leader of the gang is also a murderer and subsequently tracks and kills him.

== Production ==
=== Development ===
The episode was written by co-executive producer Tim Schlattmann, and was directed by S. J. Clarkson. This was Schlattmann's 11th writing credit, and Clarkson's second directing credit.

== Reception ==
=== Viewers ===
In its original American broadcast, "Once Upon a Time..." was seen by an estimated 1.71 million household viewers with a 0.9 in the 18–49 demographics. This means that 0.9 percent of all households with televisions watched the episode. This was a 22% decrease in viewership from the previous episode, which was watched by an estimated 2.19 million household viewers with a 1.1 in the 18–49 demographics.

=== Critical reviews ===
"Once Upon a Time..." received generally positive reviews. Matt Fowler of IGN gave the episode a "good" 7.5 out of 10, and wrote, ""Once Upon a Time" tried its very best to present the theme of Dexter not wanting to show Harrison his "monster" side, but there's only so many times you can attack the same theme from different angles. Dexter's been fretting about Harrison ever since the beginning of last season, which means he's empathetic. And that he cares. And that he's way more capable of being a real human being around his son than the show would have us believe. The scenes between him and Harrison, at the end, were as normal as one could hope for."

Joshua Alston of The A.V. Club gave the episode a "B" grade and wrote, "If Dexter is to remain compelling for the subsequent seasons that are probably in store, this season, which is the closest thing yet to a full-blown reboot, has to set that agenda." Richard Rys of Vulture wrote, "Beyond the questions of faith and forgiveness, this season poses an even bigger one — can a monster ever truly change? Dexter isn't convinced. If Brother Sam can't prove him wrong, they both seem destined for grim final chapters of their own."

Chase Gamradt of BuddyTV wrote, "The season is picking up steam, let's just hope that it doesn't stray too much into a Dan Brown novel before too long." Ian Grey of Salon wrote, "at least this episode was better than the sixth season premiere, thanks mainly to the focus on Dexter's sister Deb, the show's MVP, played by professional exposed nerve Jennifer Carpenter."

Billy Grifter of Den of Geek wrote, "For the second episode of the season, Dexter appears to be firing on all cylinders somewhat earlier than I'd anticipated. The only problem with that is, can the writers keep cranking up the tension continuously from this point onwards? They managed it in season four, but that was exceptional." Matt Richenthal of TV Fanatic gave the episode a 4 star rating out of 5 and wrote, "I watch Dexter solely for Dexter and I also like my Dexter as part of a cat-and-mouse game. I like it when he hunts and when he's on the run and when he's doing all he can to stay one step ahead of the police or whatever Big Bad the show is featuring that season. There's only so much reflection I can take, which is why the start of season six feels a bit slow."

Claire Zulkey of Los Angeles Times wrote, "One of the biggest issues I've had with Dexter in seasons past is how comparatively weak the Miami Police Department storylines are compared to the rest of the show — they're murder cops, after all, not accountants. Why did they have to be so dull? But from what I've seen so far, Dexter's co-workers are getting better treatment in Season 6." Television Without Pity gave the episode a "C" grade.
