= Those Kinds of Things =

- Dexter episode
- Episode no.: Season 6 Episode 1
- Directed by: John Dahl
- Written by: Scott Buck
- Cinematography by: Alan Caso
- Editing by: Louis Cioffi
- Original release date: October 2, 2011
- Running time: 54 minutes

Guest appearances
- Colin Hanks as Travis Marshall (special guest star); Edward James Olmos as James Gellar (special guest star); Geoff Pierson as Thomas Matthews; Aimee Garcia as Jamie Batista; John Brotherton as Joe Walker; Kristen Miller as Trisha Billings; Michael Hyatt as Admissions Director

Episode chronology
← Previous "The Big One"	Next → "Once Upon a Time..."
- Dexter season 6

"Those Kinds of Things" is the first episode of the sixth season of the American crime drama television series Dexter. It is the 61st overall episode of the series and was written by showrunner Scott Buck, and was directed by John Dahl. It originally aired on Showtime on October 2, 2011.

Set in Miami, the series centers on Dexter Morgan, a forensic technician specializing in bloodstain pattern analysis for the fictional Miami Metro Police Department, who leads a secret parallel life as a vigilante serial killer, hunting down murderers who have not been adequately punished by the justice system due to corruption or legal technicalities. In the episode, Dexter attends his 20-year high school reunion to hunt his next victim, while two new serial killers emerge.

According to Nielsen Media Research, the episode was seen by an estimated 2.19 million household viewers and gained a 1.1 ratings share among adults aged 18–49. The episode received mixed-to-positive reviews from critics, although some criticized the writing and new character development.

== Plot ==
Dexter (Michael C. Hall) is shown writhing in pain. He calls 911 and requests paramedics for what he says is a stab wound. It turns out that it was all a part of his plan to trap two specific paramedics who have been letting patients die so that their organs can be harvested and sold for huge profits on the local black market. Dexter then charges up a defibrillator and shocks each paramedic until they're both dead.

A year after Rita's death, Dexter's life is back to normal, or at least as normal as his life gets. Batista's sister Jamie (Aimee Garcia) has become Harrison's babysitter, and she takes care of Harrison whenever Dexter is away from home. Dexter and Debra (Jennifer Carpenter) visit a Catholic pre-school which they plan on having Harrison attend.

Back at Miami Metro, LaGuerta (Lauren Vélez) is promoted to captain. It is revealed that LaGuerta blackmailed Deputy Chief Matthews (Geoff Pierson), whose name was on a prostitute's ledger, to give her the promotion. Masuka (C. S. Lee) has taken up the responsibility of teaching a group of forensic science students, eventually hiring Ryan Chambers (Brea Grant) as his intern. Batista (David Zayas) and Laguerta have divorced, but remain friends. Meanwhile, Dexter attends his high school reunion on the suspicion that the high school quarterback had murdered his wife, whom Dexter remembers fondly (she had been one of the few people to treat Dexter with kindness during high school), and is surprised to find himself getting along with his former classmates, with Trisha Billings (Kristen Miller), a very attractive woman who used to copy Dexter's answers in class, giving him a "thank you" in the form of oral sex. After obtaining the quarterback's blood and finding a perfect DNA match from the wife's murder scene records (from underneath her fingernails), Dexter realizes his instincts were right all along. He later traps the man, is not impressed with his rationalizations for the murder, and kills him.

Quinn (Desmond Harrington) prepares to propose to Debra, only to be interrupted by a shooter in the restaurant. Debra exchanges fire with the perpetrator and then tackles him, making her a local hero.

This episode introduces the season's primary antagonists, Travis Marshall (Colin Hanks) and Professor Gellar (Edward James Olmos), two serial killers who base their murders on passages from the Book of Revelation; they believe they have been chosen by God to bring about the apocalypse. They kill a fruit vendor, replace his intestines with snakes, and stitch him with a symbol of alpha and omega.

== Production ==
=== Development ===
The episode was written by showrunner Scott Buck, and was directed by John Dahl. This was Buck's 13th writing credit, and Dahl's eighth directing credit.

== Reception ==
=== Viewers ===
In its original American broadcast, "Those Kinds of Things" was seen by an estimated 2.19 million household viewers with a 1.1 in the 18–49 demographics. This means that 1.1 percent of all households with televisions watched the episode. This was a 12% decrease in viewership from the previous episode, which was watched by an estimated 2.48 million household viewers with a 1.1/3 in the 18–49 demographics.

=== Critical reviews ===
"Those Kinds of Things" received mixed-to-positive reviews. Matt Fowler of IGN gave the episode a "great" 8 out of 10, and wrote, ""Those Kinds of Things" set things up neatly and right now Dexter and the major villains are in separate corners. At this point, six years in, this isn't landmark stuff though. For everyone who's come in and out of Dexter's life, and whose somewhat disposable characters were supposed to "play a role in his evolution," the Bay Harbor butcher still seems mostly un-evolved. Especially considering all those who might feel that this episode is a "return to form." Still, it's always a good thing when Dexter Morgan pops back up in our lives and every new season comes scented with a lovely hint of macabre merriment."

Joshua Alston of The A.V. Club gave the episode a "B–" grade and wrote, "I have very little patience for the episodic stories in which Dexter, in the course of his daily life, just happens to keep stumbling over unpunished murderers. This season, I want to see Dexter back on the hunt, and I want him to be totally unconflicted about it. Is that so much to ask?"

Alan Sepinwall of HitFix wrote, "maybe later episodes will win me over more, but Dexter is what it is at this point. Tonight, at least, it was something that entertained me." Richard Rys of Vulture wrote, "Between the Christ Killers and Dexter's efforts to enroll Harrison at a Catholic preschool, matters of faith are the threads that will tie this season together. It's an interesting angle the show hasn’t explored much yet — how does this “noble” killer reconcile his actions with a sense of spirituality?"

Sandra Gonzalez of Entertainment Weekly wrote, "Overall, it all left me incredibly hopeful about the season to come — and wondering how, after so many seasons, this show seems to be as incredible as ever. But that brings me to my point, readers. Was this a fantastic episode? Or were my expectations low after a lackluster season? Maybe a little bit of both?" Ian Grey of Salon wrote, "Why, show, why? In a world where most good series follow the most golden of rules — show, don't tell -- Dexter in its dotage has become cocky about telling and telling but rarely showing."

Billy Grifter of Den of Geek wrote, "Dexter always starts the season slow, and then builds, and from that perspective, "Those Kinds of Things" showed enough potential without cutting to the chase or providing a predictable direction that we're destined to follow." Matt Richenthal of TV Fanatic gave the episode a 3.7 star rating out of 5 and wrote, "though it's way too early to know what they are up to or how they fit in to the grand narrative, Colin Hanks and Edward James Olmos definitely made a creepy first impression. I look forward to a lot more from this mysterious mentor and his protege."

Claire Zulkey of Los Angeles Times wrote, "I felt like this episode took me back to a time when Dexter made me love its dark humor and perversion, something I hadn't experienced as strongly since Season 4, and then before that Season 1. I'm ready to laugh at murder again. It's “Dexter Time.”" Television Without Pity gave the episode a "C" grade.
