= Nebraska (Dexter) =

- Dexter episode
- Brian Moser (Christian Camargo) talks to Dexter (Michael C. Hall) in the foreground while having a conversation with Debra (Jennifer Carpenter).
- Episode no.: Season 6 Episode 7
- Directed by: Romeo Tirone
- Written by: Wendy West
- Cinematography by: Martin J. Layton
- Editing by: Louis Cioffi
- Original release date: November 13, 2011
- Running time: 52 minutes

Guest appearances
- Colin Hanks as Travis Marshall (special guest star); Edward James Olmos as James Gellar (special guest star); Christian Camargo as Brian Moser; Aimee Garcia as Jamie Batista; Billy Brown as Mike Anderson; Molly Parker as Lisa Marshall; Josh Cooke as Louis Greene; Brando Eaton as Jonah Mitchell; Scott Michael Campbell as Norm; Cherilyn Wilson as Laci

Episode chronology
← Previous "Just Let Go"	Next → "Sin of Omission"
- Dexter season 6

"Nebraska" is the seventh episode of the sixth season of the American crime drama television series Dexter. It is the 67th overall episode of the series and was written by co-executive producer Wendy West, and was directed by Romeo Tirone. It originally aired on Showtime on November 13, 2011.

Set in Miami, the series centers on Dexter Morgan, a forensic technician specializing in bloodstain pattern analysis for the fictional Miami Metro Police Department, who leads a secret parallel life as a vigilante serial killer, hunting down murderers who have not been adequately punished by the justice system due to corruption or legal technicalities. In the episode, Dexter goes on a road trip when the Trinity Killer is reported to have returned, while Travis abandons Gellar.

According to Nielsen Media Research, the episode was seen by an estimated 1.99 million household viewers and gained a 1.0 ratings share among adults aged 18–49. The episode received mixed reviews from critics, with many criticizing the lack of progress in the main storylines, although the scenes between Dexter and Brian were singled out for praise.

== Plot ==
Dexter (Michael C. Hall) dumps Nick's body in the ocean, while the presence of Brian (Christian Camargo) tries to compel him into accepting the darkness within himself. Dexter debates over his brother's sudden appearance, and whether he should lean into that aspect.

Dexter is called to the station, where Debra (Jennifer Carpenter) informs him that the Trinity Killer has killed his wife and daughter, while Jonah (Brando Eaton) survived. This confuses Dexter, as he knows he killed him. He gets a few days off, and heads off to Kearney, Nebraska to visit Jonah. During the road trip, Brian persuades Dexter in taking a more care-free attitude. Dexter has sex with a clerk, steals her handgun and uses it to recklessly shoot in the street. He then talks with Jonah, who claims he saw Arthur commit the murders, unaware that Dexter killed him.

Dexter leaves his car at a motel, but the owner Norm (Scott Michael Campbell) gets scared when Dexter discovers he owns a marijuana farm. Dexter sneaks into Jonah's house to confront him, but he instead runs off. Finding that Norm took his tools, Dexter confronts him. Norm believes Dexter might be a federal agent and tries to extort him, prompting an angry Dexter to kill him and dispose his body. Travis (Colin Hanks) tells Gellar (Edward James Olmos) that he is done working for God, and moves back with his sister, Lisa (Molly Parker). He later brings Gellar's stuff back, and Gellar claims only God can release him from his duties. The woman he released, Holly, testifies with the police over her experience.

Jonah gets Dexter to meet him at the hardware store he works at, where he tries unsuccessfully to attack him. To Dexter's surprise, Jonah wants him to kill him. He reveals that Sally blamed him and Rebecca for Arthur's crimes, which led to Rebecca committing suicide in the bathtub, in turn leading Jonah to kill his mother. Brian wants him to kill Jonah, but Dexter refuses, as Jonah feels remorse. Dexter simply walks away, telling Jonah he will have to live with it. He then drives past the spirit of Brian, fading it from existence. He then imagines himself picking up Harry (James Remar), taking him back as his conscience.

== Production ==
=== Development ===
The episode was written by co-executive producer Wendy West, and was directed by Romeo Tirone. This was West's sixth writing credit, and Tirone's fourth directing credit.

== Reception ==
=== Viewers ===
In its original American broadcast, "Nebraska" was seen by an estimated 1.99 million household viewers with a 1.0 in the 18–49 demographics. This means that 1 percent of all households with televisions watched the episode. This was a slight increase in viewership from the previous episode, which was watched by an estimated 1.98 million household viewers with a 1.0 in the 18–49 demographics.

=== Critical reviews ===
"Nebraska" received mixed reviews. Matt Fowler of IGN gave the episode a "great" 8 out of 10, and wrote, "After last week's "holy s***!" ending I was hoping for a newer, darker Dexter to emerge from the ashes, setting this season off in a different, unforeseeable direction. Brian appearing during the last seconds of "Just Let Go" signaled that Dexter had basically given up on the past four or five years of personal evolution and had resigned to live in the darkness forever. And maybe not just a regression of his personality, but an alteration. Dexter might transform into someone we've haven't even seen him be on this show. Unfortunately, "Nebraska" wasn't quite the follow up I was hoping for."

Joshua Alston of The A.V. Club gave the episode a "C+" grade and wrote, "Considering the manner and speed with which the idea was burned through, I'd say the execution was lacking. “Nebraska” was more enjoyable than last week's episode, but for a road trip episode, it sure felt like the wheels were spinning in place." Richard Rys of Vulture wrote, "when a road trip is that much fun, who cares about plot advancement? Instead, we're treated to some deliciously bad Dexter behavior, the return of the other brother in his life, and a new twist in the Trinity Killer case."

Chase Gamradt of BuddyTV wrote, "I was looking forward to this episode, and I thought that the guy who played Brian did an excellent job, but it felt like filler to draw out the DDK case a little bit longer." Ian Grey of Salon wrote, "Dexter won't take away the things he can never have. It's small things like this that keep this fantasy of a serial killer on the knife-edge of our sympathies. Like all monsters, Dexter, raised in unimaginable violence and horror, was made, not born this way."

Billy Grifter of Den of Geek wrote, "Overall, Nebraska was a nice interlude, almost a stand-alone story, which gives the narrative time to draw breath before the sprint to the line, one that we’re rapidly approaching. Having let the wheels spin this week somewhat, I think that the show needs to move up a gear in episode eight if it’s to get to top speed by the end of the season." Matt Richenthal of TV Fanatic gave the episode a 2.5 star rating out of 5 and wrote, "Can we please do away with these questions now? Can we up the suspense ante? Deliver a sense of urgency? A cliffhanger that leaves us wondering what will happen next and leaves character scrambling for their lives? We’ve seen none of that this season. I've been a fan of Dexter since day one, but the contemplative, angst-ridden act has grown old."

Claire Zulkey of Los Angeles Times wrote, "After a dalliance with the dark, Dexter has come back to warily embrace the light. I'm not sure if we'll be able to say the same for Travis Marshall, though." Television Without Pity gave the episode a "B–" grade.

=== Accolades ===
For the episode, Michael C. Hall was nominated for Outstanding Lead Actor in a Drama Series at the 64th Primetime Emmy Awards. He lost the award to Damian Lewis for Homeland.
