= The Angel of Death (Dexter) =

- Dexter episode
- Episode no.: Season 6 Episode 5
- Directed by: S. J. Clarkson
- Written by: Scott Reynolds
- Cinematography by: Romeo Tirone
- Editing by: Keith Henderson
- Original release date: October 30, 2011
- Running time: 51 minutes

Guest appearances
- Colin Hanks as Travis Marshall (special guest star); Mos Def as Brother Sam (special guest star); Edward James Olmos as James Gellar (special guest star); Aimee Garcia as Jamie Batista; Billy Brown as Mike Anderson; Mariana Klaveno as Carissa Porter; Josh Cooke as Louis Greene; Rya Kihlstedt as Michelle Ross

Episode chronology
← Previous "A Horse of a Different Color"	Next → "Just Let Go"
- Dexter season 6

"The Angel of Death" is the fifth episode of the sixth season of the American crime drama television series Dexter. It is the 65th overall episode of the series and was written by co-producer Scott Reynolds, and was directed by S. J. Clarkson. It originally aired on Showtime on October 30, 2011.

Set in Miami, the series centers on Dexter Morgan, a forensic technician specializing in bloodstain pattern analysis for the fictional Miami Metro Police Department, who leads a secret parallel life as a vigilante serial killer, hunting down murderers who have not been adequately punished by the justice system due to corruption or legal technicalities. In the episode, Dexter investigates Travis by his own, while Travis is pressured by Gellar to find new victims.

According to Nielsen Media Research, the episode was seen by an estimated 1.80 million household viewers and gained a 0.8 ratings share among adults aged 18–49. The episode received mixed-to-positive reviews from critics, with many criticizing the lack of progress and repetitive themes.

== Plot ==
Dexter (Michael C. Hall) investigates Erin's corpse's wings. He notices glue, and tracks it down to a specific ancient exhibition. Without informing the police, he decides to form his own research and visits the museum. He discovers that Travis (Colin Hanks), who was in the scene, also works there.

With Gellar (Edward James Olmos) quickly named as a prime suspect by the media, Travis is forced to stalk the victims himself, as they prepare to find the "Whore of Babylon". Travis follows a woman to a party, but fails in capturing her, forcing Gellar to step in and help him kidnap another woman. At the same time, Angel (David Zayas) and Quinn (Desmond Harrington) interrogate Gellar's assistant, Carissa Porter (Mariana Klaveno), who is unsure if Gellar is truly the Doomsday Killer. Angel is annoyed when Quinn and Carissa flirt with each other, and they later end up having sex.

Masuka (C. S. Lee) hires a new intern, Louis (Josh Cooke), and privately asks him to help him retrieve the Ice Truck Killer's prosthetic hand from the auction site. Louis fails to find it, but removes all the search history of the hand to prevent it from getting leaked. Debra (Jennifer Carpenter) is scolded by Jamie (Aimee Garcia) when Harrison walks in and sees some of the graphic pictures of a crime scene, and she decides to take therapy. She also decides to get a new place to move out, deciding to take a house where a murder-suicide took place. Dexter, meanwhile, continues talking with Brother Sam (Mos Def), revealing that he feels darkness inside him after witnessing his mother's murder when he was young. Sam simply tells him that he needs to use all his good will to overcome the darkness within.

Dexter breaks into Travis' house and discovers his research, concluding he is involved in the murders. He later returns to attack him and question him. Travis explains that Gellar is the person in charge and he is frustrated that he cannot do it himself. This prompts Dexter to spare him and leave, but he continues following him. As he opens his shop, Brother Sam is shot by an unknown assailant.

== Production ==
=== Development ===
The episode was written by co-producer Scott Reynolds, and was directed by S. J. Clarkson. This was Reynolds' sixth writing credit, and Clarkson's third directing credit.

== Reception ==
=== Viewers ===
In its original American broadcast, "The Angel of Death" was seen by an estimated 1.80 million household viewers with a 0.8 in the 18–49 demographics. This means that 0.8 percent of all households with televisions watched the episode. This was a slight decrease in viewership from the previous episode, which was watched by an estimated 1.89 million household viewers with a 0.9 in the 18–49 demographics.

=== Critical reviews ===
"The Angel of Death" received mixed-to-positive reviews. Matt Fowler of IGN gave the episode a "great" 8 out of 10, and wrote, "Dexter continued to stay a bit stronger this week with "The Angel of Death." But what started out as a grand "hunt" ended with a big, nonsensical fumble."

Joshua Alston of The A.V. Club gave the episode a "C" grade and wrote, "Of all the things that surprised me about "The Angel Of Death," perhaps the thing I found most surprising is that it's only the fifth episode of the season. Maybe it's a superficial observation, but man alive, am I the only person who feels like this season of Dexter must have started back when Greece was financially solvent? A guy could be forgiven for thinking we were up to episode 10 or so, though I'm still trying to put my finger on why it feels that way."

Richard Rys of Vulture wrote, "If someone told you that we'd go two weeks in a row without seeing Dexter dump body parts off his boat, you'd probably say that's a bad sign of where this season is headed. Yet last night was the second consecutive kill-free episode that was still completely satisfying." Price Peterson of TV.com wrote, "While "The Angel of Death" certainly had its moments, this episode was exactly the sort of mid-season wheel-spinning that every season of Dexter has indulged in. So in other words, it was kind of a bummer, but there were still some highlights."

Chase Gamradt of BuddyTV wrote, "I'm sad that Brother Sam is dead because I was really liking him as a character. I think the world needs more Mos Def." Ian Grey of Salon wrote, "Long-suffering Season 6 viewers were spared the nonstop God talk and general religiosity on Dexter last night. Director S.J. Clarkson brought a sinuous sense of purposeful movement, mood and narrative flow."

Billy Grifter of Den of Geek wrote, "Overall, Dexter is looking strong at this point, and once we hit the centre space of the season, I can already feel the momentum building that will be converted into pure pace later on." Matt Richenthal of TV Fanatic gave the episode a 2 star rating out of 5 and wrote, "Overall, there's just been no sense of urgency this season. Is any viewer on the edge of his/her seat because Brother Sam got shot? He's not connected to the main storyline, he's just been a prop to shove this whole faith issue down our throats. If the lesson Dexter learns from Sam's death is that he's bound to live a life of darkness... isn't that the lesson he's learned every single season?"

Claire Zulkey of Los Angeles Times wrote, "thus far I'm enjoying guessing what happens in this season of Dexter. The episode ended with a new twist: Sam enters his garage, bathed in sunlight, and he's shot by an unknown bad guy. At first I figured that Brother Sam had simply been murdered, but now I wonder if he'll hang on, and Dexter will somehow have to help him in a way that will be a serious sacrifice: the "whatever it is" he promised God two episodes ago." Television Without Pity gave the episode a "B–" grade.
