= Just Let Go (Dexter) =

- Dexter episode
- Episode no.: Season 6 Episode 6
- Directed by: John Dahl
- Written by: Jace Richdale
- Cinematography by: Martin J. Layton
- Editing by: Michael Ruscio
- Original release date: November 6, 2011
- Running time: 54 minutes

Guest appearances
- Colin Hanks as Travis Marshall (special guest star); Mos Def as Brother Sam (special guest star); Edward James Olmos as James Gellar (special guest star); Christian Camargo as Brian Moser; Aimee Garcia as Jamie Batista; Billy Brown as Mike Anderson; Molly Parker as Lisa Marshall; Mariana Klaveno as Carissa Porter; Josh Cooke as Louis Greene; Rya Kihlstedt as Dr. Michelle Ross

Episode chronology
← Previous "The Angel of Death"	Next → "Nebraska"
- Dexter season 6

"Just Let Go" is the sixth episode of the sixth season of the American crime drama television series Dexter. It is the 66th overall episode of the series and was written by co-executive producer Jace Richdale, and was directed by John Dahl. It originally aired on Showtime on November 6, 2011.

Set in Miami, the series centers on Dexter Morgan, a forensic technician specializing in bloodstain pattern analysis for the fictional Miami Metro Police Department, who leads a secret parallel life as a vigilante serial killer, hunting down murderers who have not been adequately punished by the justice system due to corruption or legal technicalities. In the episode, Dexter tracks Brother Sam's shooter, while Travis starts having second thoughts over his commitment to Gellar's mission.

According to Nielsen Media Research, the episode was seen by an estimated 1.98 million household viewers and gained a 1.0 ratings share among adults aged 18–49. The episode received mixed reviews from critics, with many criticizing Dexter's storyline and lack of focus on the Doomsday Killer story arc, although some were intrigued by its ending.

== Plot ==
Dexter (Michael C. Hall) discovers that Brother Sam (Mos Def) has been shot in his shop. He believes he might be to blame for his shooting, believing that the gang he confronted probably took action against Sam after their leader disappeared.

Travis (Colin Hanks) begins having second thoughts over his mission, but Gellar (Edward James Olmos) insists he continue. He feels guilt for the woman kidnapped whom they intend to use as the Whore of Babylon, and questions Gellar's tactics. Despite Gellar ordering him to not care for her, Travis provides her with food. Angel (David Zayas) questions Carissa (Mariana Klaveno) over her involvement with Gellar, forcing Quinn (Desmond Harrington) to not get involved. However, Debra (Jennifer Carpenter) orders Quinn to join him, which results in their affair exposed. Due to this, Carissa cannot be a witness to the case, ruining it and upsetting Debra.

Dexter finds that Leo, one of the gangmembers, might be responsible for Sam's shooting and follows him. However, Mike (Billy Brown) arrives at his house to raid it upon receiving a lead, and Leo is killed. The case is closed, but Dexter realizes that the shooter might actually be Nick, as Sam's dog does not bark at him. He talks with Brother Sam, who confirms Nick shot him. Nevertheless, Sam wants Dexter to not let the darkness within to consume him, and wants him to forgive Nick. Per her therapist's suggestion, Debra hosts a house-warming party for her new house. However, the event is crashed by a drunk Quinn, who brings a girl with him. When he tries to make a pass on Jamie (Aimee Garcia), Angel punches him and he walks off ashamed.

Reaching his limit, Travis decides to release the woman and drops her off near a beach. Dexter is later informed that Brother Sam succumbed to his wounds, and debates over his conversation about Nick. He takes him to the beach, where he makes it clear he knows he shot him, and Nick confesses. Nevertheless, he also says he forgives him. Realizing that Sam died, Nick takes it as good news. This angers Dexter, who subsequently drowns Nick in the water. After killing him, Dexter looks back at the soil, seeing Brian Moser (Christian Camargo) applauding him.

== Production ==
=== Development ===
The episode was written by co-executive producer Jace Richdale, and was directed by John Dahl. This was Richdale's first writing credit, and Dahl's tenth directing credit.

== Reception ==
=== Viewers ===
In its original American broadcast, "Just Let Go" was seen by an estimated 1.98 million household viewers with a 1.0 in the 18–49 demographics. This means that 1 percent of all households with televisions watched the episode. This was a 10% increase in viewership from the previous episode, which was watched by an estimated 1.80 million household viewers with a 0.8 in the 18–49 demographics.

=== Critical reviews ===
"Just Let Go" received mixed reviews. Matt Fowler of IGN gave the episode an "amazing" 9 out of 10, and wrote, "What a surprise this episode turned out to be. Especially considering the fact that it steered Dexter way off the trail off the Doomsday Killer and, because of that, I fully expected not to like it. And so, in what turned out to be the best episode of the season so far, "Just Let Go" hit all the right notes and gave us one hell of an ending."

Joshua Alston of The A.V. Club gave the episode a "C–" grade and wrote, "On paper, I see how this all could have seemed like a good idea. The choice to kill or spare Nick is one that gave Dexter the opportunity to choose his light or his darkness, and once he made his choice, Brian appeared to him, thrilled that the brother he'd always wanted is finally ready to stop playing by polite society's rules. But it's hard to get excited about any of this when it's all so clearly meant to distract from the Doomsday Duo (who barely did anything of note in this episode) long enough to finish pulling off the “big twist.” And when that moment comes, it is basically going to be the most embarrassing thing of all time. That's coming from an optimist."

Richard Rys of Vulture wrote, "All of those earlier Ice Truck Killer references were apparently paving the way for the return of Dexter's brother Rudy, who looks like he'll be the devil on Dex's shoulder, competing for his anytime talk-to-the-dead minutes with Harry." Ian Grey of Salon wrote, "This season's God obsession has been exposed as nothing more than color and cover-story for a freakier-than-usual serial killer riff and as a way for the show to mark time until a final, awesome season that may come sooner than the show's creators wanted. Because right now, the only mystery about Dexter is why people who can barely afford cable are still shelling out extra for a sad Xerox of better days."

Billy Grifter of Den of Geek wrote, "There is always something about episode six in a Dexter season that delivers a tingle down my spine, knowing that the chess pieces are mostly placed, and it’s time for the primal forces to be unleashed. And boy, do they get loose here." Matt Richenthal of TV Fanatic gave the episode a 2.4 star rating out of 5 and wrote, "A realization on Dexter's part that he's such a dark individual that he's akin to his brother, hence the vision? I don't buy it. I see this as the same Dexter he's always been, both in viewer's eyes and in his own. So that's where I stand on the season so far. It's repeating the same themes as past seasons and, above all else, it's simply boring."

Claire Zulkey of Los Angeles Times wrote, "So how do you feel about Dexter disobeying Sam's final wish? I think I should be disappointed in him for not being able to see the light, but I don't think Sam thought Nick would turn out to be so inherently evil." Television Without Pity gave the episode a "D" grade.
