= Horse of a Different Color =

Horse of a Different Color may refer to:

- Horse of a Different Color (Big & Rich album)
- Horse of a Different Color (Willy DeVille album)
- "A Horse of a Different Color", an episode in the sixth season of the Showtime television series Dexter
- "A Horse of a Different Color", a season 2 episode of Jack of All Trades
- "A Horse of a Different Color", an episode of the animated television series Rainbow Brite
- The Horse of a Different Color, a horse in Emerald City in the film The Wizard of Oz

== See also ==
- All horses are the same color, a paradox
