= Go for It! (2011 film) =

- Directed by: Carmen Marrón
- Written by: Carmen Marrón
- Starring: Aimee Garcia
- Release date: May 13, 2011
- Running time: 105 minutes
- Country: United States
- Language: English

Go for It! is a 2011 American musical drama film written and directed by Carmen Marrón and starring Aimee Garcia.

== Cast ==
- Aimee Garcia as Carmen Salgado
- Al Bandiero as Frank Martin
- Jossara Jinaro as Loli
- Gina Rodriguez as Gina
- Louie Alegria as Pablo
- Derrick Denicola as Jared
- Andres Perez-Molina as Jesse Salgado

== Release ==
The film was released on May 13, 2011.

== Reception ==
Andy Webster of The New York Times gave the film a positive review, calling it "an unpretentious rite-of-passage drama whose merits belie the banality of its title."

Kimberley Jones of The Austin Chronicle awarded the film two and a half stars out of five, describing it as "earnest and sympathetic but unsophisticated."

Frank Scheck of The Hollywood Reporter gave the film a negative review and wrote that it "never manages to conjure an iota of the joyful exuberance that enlivens even the most formulaic dance films."
