= The Last Lovecraft: Relic of Cthulhu =

- Film poster
- Directed by: Henry Saine
- Written by: Devin McGinn
- Starring: Kyle Davis; Devin McGinn; Barak Hardley; Gregg Lawrence; Ethan Wilde
- Cinematography: Cameron Cannon
- Music by: Michael Tavera
- Release date: October 3, 2009 (H. P. Lovecraft Film Festival)
- Running time: 78 minutes
- Country: United States
- Language: English

The Last Lovecraft: Relic of Cthulhu is a 2009 horror comedy film directed by Henry Saine about the last living relative of noted short-story writer H. P. Lovecraft. The film premiered at the Slamdance Film Festival and was acquired by MPI Media. It had its international theatrical release in August 2010 at Toronto's fifth annual After Dark Film Festival through MPI's Dark Sky Films label. It was later released on DVD and VOD in October 2010.

== Plot ==
Jeff Philips is working a dead end job at a call center. One day, Professor Lake, a member of a secret society, arrives at his apartment to tell him he is the last descendant of H. P. Lovecraft and must guard a relic to keep it from being reunited. If the pieces of the relic are united while the stars are in alignment, the sunken city of R'lyeh will rise from the sea and the demonic creature Cthulhu will be released upon an unsuspecting world.

Shortly thereafter, squid-like "deep ones" attack and Jeff flees with his friend from work, Charlie, a comic book artist. Cult followers of Cthulhu pursue them to reunite the relic. They find an old high school acquaintance, Paul, an expert on the Cthulhu mythos, and enlist him in their cause. The three flee to the desert to seek Captain Olaf, a sailor who has first-hand experience with the cult. Eventually, the cult members attack them and Paul is taken by the cult, only to later escape and reunite with the others at Olaf's RV. Cthulhu's general, Star Spawn, and the deep ones corner them in the captain's RV. In their haste to flee, Jeff and Charlie leave the relic behind, and Star Spawn re-assembles it. This causes everyone but Jeff, as the last in the Lovecraft bloodline, excruciating pain. As Cthulhu prepares to escape his undersea prison, Jeff shoots some dynamite, destroying Star Spawn, separating the relic, and saving the world.

Sometime later, we see Charlie doing a comic book signing for his new book based on his and Jeff's adventures. While he is telling a young and disbelieving comic fan that the story is true, Jeff arrives with an ancient map of more artifacts they must safeguard. They quickly leave for the Antarctic and arrive at the Mountains of Madness.

== Cast ==
- Kyle Davis as Jeff
- Devin McGinn as Charlie
- Barak Hardley as Paul
- Gregg Lawrence as Captain Olaf
- Ethan Wilde as Star Spawn
- Edmund Lipinski as Professor Lake
- Matt Bauer as Deep One
- Honor Bliss as Miss Roming
- Martin Starr as Clarence
- Richard Riehle as Mr. Snodgrass

== See also ==
- Cthulhu Mythos
