= Lost Experience =

Alternate reality game

The Lost Experience was an alternate reality game that was part of the American television drama Lost. The game was developed by ABC in the United States, Channel 4 in the UK, and Channel 7 in Australia. It was written by Jordan Rosenberg and created by the agency Hi-ReS!. The experience played out during Lost's second season in the United Kingdom and during the summer break in the United States until the launch of season 3. The Lost Experience, which was announced by the United Kingdom's Channel 4, Australia's Seven Network and the United States' ABC on 24 April 2006, and began in May 2006, used websites, voice mail, television and newspaper ads and a novel to give players clues to the game. The Lost Experience ended on September 24, 2006. Damon Lindelof has verified the canonical status of The Lost Experience and the information provided therein.

ABC Entertainment's senior vice president of marketing, Mike Benson, described the game as a hybrid between content and marketing. This type of marketing was previously used by ABC for Lost's premiere in 2004. ABC created a website for the fictional Oceanic Airlines, the airline of the plane that crashed in the show's pilot episode.

== Premise ==
The game is divided into five phases.

=== First phase ===
The first began on 2 May 2006 in the United Kingdom, 3 May 2006 in the United States and Australia, with a television commercial that aired during an episode of Lost for the fictional Hanso Foundation, a corporation mentioned on the television show. The advertisement listed a telephone number which brought up fictional voice mail lines for employees at the Hanso Foundation. Some of these messages provided clues to be used in the Hanso Foundation's website. Commercials for the Hanso Foundation in subsequent weeks directed players to other in-game websites, some of which are tied to specific sponsors, as detailed below.

Several different websites for fictional organizations or individuals mentioned on the show or in part of the Lost Experience were introduced. The websites, particularly the Hanso Foundation website, contain background information into the mythology of Lost. The character Rachel Blake (Jamie Silberhartz), also known as Persephone, is introduced to guide players through the game. Most clues on the Hanso Foundation website are revealed by clicking on faintly marked anomalies in the web page design or by entering specific codes into webpages. Some require passwords found elsewhere, such as in the voicemail service. The clue revelations are designed as minigames, though with little challenge as they are completely linear. A notable exception are the coded messages on persephone.thehansofoundation.org, involving simple encoding schemes such as ROT13 and base64.

Also in May, Hyperion published the novel Bad Twin, a book written by Laurence Shames and credited to fictional author Gary Troup, who was on the plane that crashed on Lost. Bad Twin is a mystery novel that contains references to the show and mentions the Hanso Foundation occasionally. On 9 May, various newspapers ran quarter-page ads from the Hanso Foundation which condemned the novel for giving misinformation about the Hanso Foundation. Of note is the fact that "Gary Troup" is in fact an anagram of the word "purgatory" itself, indicating that the book may itself be a red herring as the purgatory theory has been refuted.

=== Second phase ===
On 19 June, Rachel Blake's blog is revealed in the source code of the Hanso foundation site, which comes to play a major part of the second phase of the game. Rogue investigator Blake posts videos of her traveling around the world (mostly Europe) to uncover the secret agenda of the Hanso Foundation.

=== Third phase ===
hansoexposed.com is launched through a stunt at Comic-Con on 22 July 2006, marking the start of the Lost Experience phase three. The website (which was identified earlier as sharing IP address with thehansofoundation.org) features open-registration accounts to a video sequence editor. By entering alphanumeric codes new video segments can be added.

The final sequence of video segments became known as the Sri Lanka Video.

=== Fourth and fifth phases ===
In late August 2006, Apollo chocolate bars (the Apollo bar is a part of the Lost mythology and has been featured onscreen) began distribution through Forbidden Planet stores in the UK, and visits by an Apollo truck in the US. On 24 August the web site was launched. Site users may upload pictures of themselves and Apollo chocolate bars they have been issued. The uploaded pictures now form the word "unite". A certain number of Apollo bars are designated "golden oracle", and contain special codes that can also be submitted to the site. A message from Rachel Blake promises that further instructions will be given "once enough of the world is watching". Finally, the site reported that D.J. Dan would tell the full truth and finally shut down the whole thing on his radio show on 24 September at 8pm PST.

The final video (regarding the current location of Alvar Hanso) became known as the Norway Video.

Fans of Lost had been looking over the clues and discussing them on internet forums, and several websites were set up giving detailed information on all parts of the game. Since the focus was on the Web (as opposed to broadcast), the intentionally low-fi nature of some Lost Experience material and its use of consumer-oriented distribution channels such as Blogger, Flickr, and YouTube, made it particularly difficult to separate fan-made material from the official canon.

== The Hanso Foundation ==
Until 20 June 2006, when the Hanso Foundation website closed, the Lost Experience centered mainly around the Hanso Foundation website, with other tie-in websites being linked from hidden clues in the main site. The Hanso Foundation website included many easter eggs, and revealed mysteries behind the Hanso Foundation, its employees, the Dharma Initiative and the island, without spoiling the plot of Lost. In fact, within the alternate reality of the game itself, "Lost" is considered to be a fictional TV show based on real events and organizations. Since the site's closing, most new clues were related to Rachel Blake's website.

== Viral marketing sites ==
In addition to the specially created sites mentioned below, numerous videos and other bits of information have been intermixed with sponsors' official web sites. For instance, one Rachel Blake video was buried in a Jeep Compass product presentation page.

=== Sprite ===
The Hanso Foundation commercial shown during the Lost episode on 10 May 2006 contained the on-screen text "Paid for by Sprite" and directed viewers to http://sublymonal.com/. The website itself contained references to Sprite. Other clues in the game prominently contained the word "obey" (part of Sprite's slogan, "obey your thirst").

As of 10 May 2006, the clock on the Hanso Foundation's site occasionally changed to display "OB:EY" for one minute. The changes were marked by an audible blip of static. The minutes of the day at which these changes occurred correspond to the Lost numbers (4, 8, 15, 16, 23, 42), though not every occurrence of these times results in the link. When the clock does change, it becomes a clickable link to the sublymonal website.

Later a Sprite commercial appeared on the air that promoted the sublymonal website, which had changed to a completely Sprite-based subliminal ad site. One commercial showed a person blind folded with a lemon and lime slice, getting small drops of Sprite in his mouth and eye. A second commercial showed the clashing of a green sumo wrestler, and a yellow sumo wrestler into a young gentleman. These commercials both contained hidden passwords that flashed briefly onscreen. The passwords, bentley, scan, listen, tongue, chill, belly, spray, pulse, embedded, and duh could be entered into the text box on the sublymonal website for hidden videos and websites.

=== Jeep ===
The Hanso commercial shown during the episode on 17 May 2006 contained a Jeep copyright message and directed players to the website www.letyourcompassguideyou.com. Users had to spin their mouse cursor around a compass and click on "108". A figure could be seen in the compass, which looked a lot like the woman in the opening graphic on the Hanso website. A box then appeared that asked the user if they were "one of the good ones". Typing "Y" took users to a page that looked like a directory listing of the site. Typing "N" redirected users to the Hanso Foundation site. The question later changed and asked if the users believed it or not. Exploration of this site led players to a Jeep commercial hosted on YouTube, which contained game clues at the end. On 26 May access to the directories of /usr/hmcintyr/ and /usr/pthompso/ was granted, created to appear as personal mail folders for Hugh McIntyre and Peter Thompson. Their email folders contained scans of DaimlerChrysler Jeep fleet contracts for the Hanso Foundation, a link to a Jeep commercial and photos of newspaper ads.

Also mail found in the directory includes a binary sequence, which can be converted into the words "the mouth piece". Likewise, the words "the mouth piece" are found in the image in the directory.

The domain letyourcompassguideyou.com is registered to DaimlerChrysler, and the slogan "Let Your Compass Guide You" is used on the website for the 2007 Jeep Compass.

When moving the cursor to one of the "hotspots", one of the map compass points showed an odd text code in the same font as the glyphs in part 3 of the Lost experience. As of 2007 though, the code remained invalid. On 20 September the site had been replaced with a picture of a postcard and a message stating that the site had been removed. By clicking the word "removed" it redirected to a youtube video ending with an url. Additionally, highlighting the area below this will show the numbers "13/9/19/19/9/14/7/15/18/7/1/14/19", which translate to the words "missing organs". Upon clicking this, one will be directed to an index of "/usr", with a security notice. Here, from which it is possible to click on "ahanso/" to view a statement from Alvar Hanso, in addition to the previous McIntyre and Thompson folders.

=== Monster.com ===
During the 24 May episode of Lost, The Hanso Foundation advert was shown again, but with a disclaimer indicating that it was "paid for by Monster.com." The advert also mentioned the Hanso Foundation Careers website, a mock job search engine with five jobs listed (as of 25 May 2006). The site contains a link to the Monster.com website. There are several grayed letters in the job descriptions: n, s, l, u, t, m, i, e, m, a, y, a. These letters can be rearranged to form "inmate asylum", a passphrase used in the game. Lost characters Hurley and Libby were both inmates in an asylum.

=== Verizon ===
On 6 June, an advertisement aired during Boston Legal that points viewers to the Retrievers of Truth website. The website features Dr. Vincent "Wally" Bolé, a "pioneer in the field of canine parapsychology and neuroveterinary medicine". Ostensibly a site about the psychic abilities of the yellow Labrador Retriever, solving a puzzle takes the reader to a bulletin board populated by fictional Verizon employees (the users all have Verizon-related puns in their names — iobiSeeingyou, DSLerator, etc.), discussing the political machinations of the Hanso foundation within Verizon as a company. One of the posts also refers to a Verizon advertisement, in which there are clues for the Hanso foundation site. Typing "Steinbeck" in the text box where people would normally put their email address unlocks a hidden fictional forum.

== Gary Troup ==
Gary Troup is the fictitious author of Bad Twin, a tie-in novelization set within the universe of the television series Lost and the related Lost Experience. ABC has also released several videos in a nine part interview of Gary Troup, played by Laird Granger, on a fictional show called "Book Talk". The videos were released on the Amazon, Borders, and Barnes & Noble web sites on their respective Bad Twin pages. Michael Benson, the senior vice president of marketing at ABC, says that Troup was one of the initial crash victims, played by Frank Torres, of Oceanic Flight 815, being sucked into the plane's turbine in the pilot episode. Gary Troup lived in New York and was in love with Cindy Chandler, a flight attendant on Oceanic Airlines. His name is an anagram of "purgatory;" however, the show producers have stated on more than one occasion that the survivors are not in purgatory.

=== Bad Twin ===
On 18 June 2006, Daily Variety revealed that Bad Twin was ghost authored by novelist Laurence Shames. The novel is the story of a down-and-out private detective, Paul Artisan, who is hired to find Zander Widmore, the degenerate twin of Cliff Widmore, a wealthy and successful heir. As do many such stories, the case leads deeper and deeper into a sinister world of betrayal and confusion, as Artisan follows on Zander's heels all over the world, from Manhattan to Florida to Cuba to Australia. He is aided in his quest by Manny Weisman, Artisan's old college classics professor, with whom Artisan shares a dog named Argos, named after Odysseus's faithful dog. Manny provides historical context to the events in which Artisan finds himself, and often provides philosophical commentary on the actions of the various members of the Widmore family.

The 2006 novel Bad Twin, by author Gary Troup

Bad Twin exists both as a novel in the real world, and as a metanovel-in-progress within the world of Lost. The apparent manuscript of Bad Twin was discovered by the characters of Lost in Season 2 and is read by Sawyer in the episode "Two for the Road". While the novel's plot has no direct link to the television show, Bad Twin contains many references to it. In the clues about Dr. Thomas Mittelwerk's authenticity there is a statement about dealing with Gary Troup. On 9 May 2006, the fictitious corporation The Hanso Foundation ran a quarter-page ad in several major newspapers, including The Washington Post (on the 10th), The Philadelphia Inquirer, and the Chicago Tribune. The ad repudiates Bad Twin for its "attacks" and "misinformation" about the Hanso Foundation. Additionally, the Hanso Foundation website contained a press release that was equally critical of Bad Twin. While the novel Bad Twin never makes explicit reference to the events of the show, there are a number of references in the novel to things mentioned in Lost, such as Widmore Industries, the Hanso Foundation, Mr. Cluck's Chicken Shack, Paik Heavy Industry, Cindy Chandler, and the numbers.

=== The Valenzetti Equation ===
As part of his fictional background, Troup is the author of an out-of-print book titled The Valenzetti Equation about an equation derived by an also-fictional mathematician of that name. Amazon's "exclusive note" on their Bad Twin page mentions that The Valenzetti Equation is Troup's first book. The "Lost Experience" has revealed that the objective of the DHARMA Initiative is to alter any of the six factors of the Valenzetti Equation, revealed to have a huge impact on the date the human race will destroy itself, whether by global warming, chemical warfare, overpopulation or many other possible means. These factors are each associated with a number in the Valenzetti Equation, which are the numbers frequently mentioned in the show: 4, 8, 15, 16, 23 and 42.
