= Saurus City =

- Film poster
- Directed by: Nate Smith
- Written by: Nate Smith
- Produced by: Brad Johnson; Cynthia Lagow; Ron Brough
- Starring: Ron Perlman; Emma Roberts; Dennis Quaid; Tim Meadows; Aimee Garcia; Julia Ormond
- Music by: James Schafer
- Production companies: Suspended Animation Studios; Infinity Rising; 405 Productions; Bonfire Entertainment
- Running time: 85 minutes
- Country: United States
- Language: English

Saurus City is an upcoming American stop-motion fantasy film written and directed by Nate Smith, and starring Ron Perlman, Emma Roberts, Dennis Quaid, Tim Meadows, Aimee Garcia, and Julia Ormond.

== Synopsis ==
When a grizzled knight is called upon to help a young lady in distress, he discovers the entire Dinosaur Kingdom is in danger and embarks on an epic journey, risking life and limb, to deliver the one thing that will save them all: a baby.

== Cast ==
- Ron Perlman as Slade Klossus
- Emma Roberts as Sasha Nutwagon
- Dennis Quaid as Rind, the Shrouded Knight
- Tim Meadows as Filbin Nutwagon
- Aimee Garcia as Elisabeth, the Raptor Knight
- Julia Ormond as Queen Rachel

== Production ==
The film began production in 2018, and received a $128,000 tax incentive from the state of Utah. It uses stop-motion animation, 3D-printed components, and CGI enhancements.
