= Jamie Silberhartz =

American actress

Jamie Silberhartz is an actress noted for having appeared as Rachel Blake in The Lost Experience, an internet-based alternate-reality-game (ARG) related to the ABC television show, Lost.

She also had a recurring role as Bonnie the receptionist on the CBS television show Without a Trace and has appeared in commercials for Life Savers, Pizza Hut, and Sony. She has also had one time roles on Ghost Whisperer, Criminal Minds, and Dexter.
