= Kyle Davis (actor) =

American actor (born 1987)

- Born: July 9, 1978 (age 48); Downey, California, U.S.
- Occupation: Actor
- Years active: 2001–present
- Spouse: April Chappell (2011–present)

Kyle Davis (born July 9, 1978) is an American actor. He is known for his roles in the comedy It's Always Sunny In Philadelphia and comedy-dramas Men of a Certain Age and American Horror Story.

== Early life ==
Davis was born in Downey, California. When he was 14, he and his parents moved to Arizona. He attended Sedona Red Rock High School and then studied photography at Yavapai Community College. After that, he wanted to enlist in the military, but he was involved in a fight that left him blind in his left eye, preventing him from being deployed.

In 1998, Davis moved to Southern California to become a professional skateboarder. However, shortly after arriving, he tore his ACL. After some time, his cousin convinced him to consider acting instead.

== Career ==
At the age of 20, Davis began his career appearing on The Dating Game and working as an extra on shows and commercials.

Davis' first official TV role came in 2001, on an episode of Angel. After that, he has appeared in shows like Felicity, Monk, The Shield, ER, and CSI: Crime Scene Investigation. He also appeared on films like Catch Me If You Can, Elizabethtown, and the Friday the 13th remake.

From 2007 to 2011, he has had recurring roles on the comedy It's Always Sunny in Philadelphia and Men of a Certain Age. In 2011, he had recurring roles on Dexter and American Horror Story.

== Personal life ==
Davis lives in North Hollywood with his wife, April Chappell. He is a fan of the Green Bay Packers.

== Filmography ==
=== Film ===
Year	Title	Role	Notes
2002	Catch Me if You Can	Kid	
2007	The Hitcher	Buford's Store Clerk	
2009	Friday the 13th	Donnie	
2009	The Last Lovecraft: Relic of Cthulhu	Jeff	
2010	The Lost Tribe	Tom	
2010	Rachel	Cowboy	Short film
2013	Skinwalker Ranch	Ray Reed	
2014	Into the Storm	Donk	
2016	Soy Nero	Armstrong - the Deminer	
2016	Shortwave	Thomas	
2021	The Legend of Resurrection Mary		

=== Television ===
Year	Title	Role	Notes
1999–2004	Angel	Kenny	Episode: “The Thin Dead Line”
2006	CSI: NY	Jordan Stokes	Episode: "Fare Game"
2007	ER	Kyle	Episode: “The Honeymoon Is Over”
2007–2010	It's Always Sunny in Philadelphia	Kevin Gallagher (also known as Lil’ Kev)	Season 3, Episode 9: "Sweet Dee’s Dating a Retarded Person" Season 6, Episode 12: "Dee Gives Birth"
2008	Numb3rs	Evan Ricci	Episode: "Scan Man"
2009	The Mentalist	David Charles	Episode: "Red Badge"
2009–2011	Southland	Dealer	3 episodes
2011	Dexter	Steve Dorsey	3 episodes
2011	American Horror Story	Dallas	4 episodes
2011	Friends with Benefits	Todd	1 episode
2011	NCIS: Los Angeles	Bobby Asher	1 episode
2014	Enlisted	PFC Dobkiss	
2024	American Primeval	Tilly	
