= Geoff Pierson =

American actor

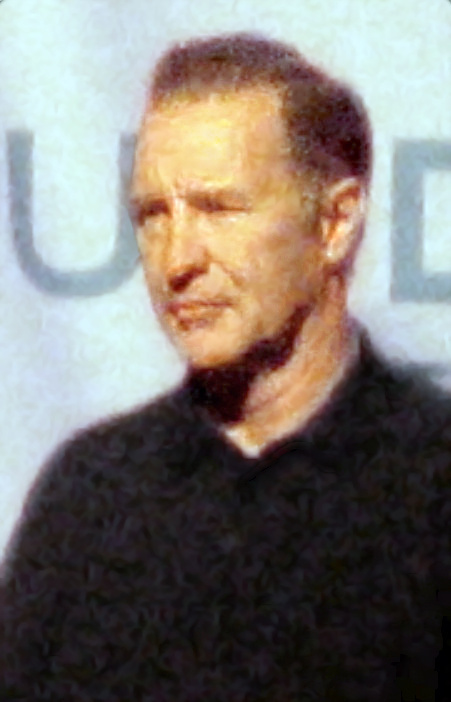
- Pierson in 2006
- Occupation: Actor
- Years active: 1980–present

Geoffrey "Geoff" Pierson is an American actor known for his television roles on Dexter, Unhappily Ever After, Grace Under Fire, 24, Ryan's Hope and Designated Survivor. He has also guest-starred in dozens of other TV shows such as Friends, Monk, Fringe, Homeland and 9-1-1.

== Career ==
Geoffrey Pierson was born and raised in Chicago, Illinois, one of seven children born to Helen T. (née Maginess) and Roy J. Pierson.

Pierson appeared with George C. Scott on Broadway in Tricks of the Trade, before continuing on to do several New York soap operas and many regional theater plays. Some notable theatrical roles include Angelo in Measure For Measure at the Yale Rep, Stanley in A Streetcar Named Desire at the Penn Ctr. Stage, Bobby in Speed The Plough at the Philadelphia Theatre Company, and Ricky in Glengarry Glen Ross and Teach in American Buff a lo at the Virginia Stage Company. His most prominent daytime role was as Frank Ryan on Ryan's Hope, a role he played from February 1983 through September 1985.

Pierson's first high-profile prime-time television role was as Jack Malloy, the head of a dysfunctional family, in The WB sitcom Unhappily Ever After, which was created by Ron Leavitt, one of the creators of FOX's Married... with Children. Other TV roles include a leading role as R.T. Howard on That 80's Show, and recurring roles on Grace Under Fire, In Plain Sight (USA) and The Firm (NBC). He also had a recurring role as Rodney's long lost dad on the ABC comedy Rodney. In 2001, he guest-starred in a Season 8 episode of Friends, "The One with Rachel's Date," playing Chandler's boss, Mr. Franklin.

In 2005 and 2006, he appeared in two episodes of Veronica Mars as Stewart Manning, the father of Meg Manning. In 2006, he guest-starred in Criminal Minds, playing Max Ryan, a former FBI agent-turned-author and Jason Gideon's mentor who comes out of his retirement to capture a serial killer known as the Keystone Killer in the episode, "Unfinished Business". From 2006 to 2013, he portrayed Miami-Dade Police Captain Tom Matthews on the Showtime series Dexter.

He appeared in the 2008 Clint Eastwood-directed film Changeling as the flamboyant defense attorney Sammy "S.S." Hahn. In 2011 he portrayed Attorney General A. Mitchell Palmer in Eastwood's J. Edgar. He appeared in Touched by an Angel, Season 9, Episode 16.

Beginning in 2010, he had a recurring role in Boardwalk Empire as Senator Walter Edge. In 2011, Pierson played Midas Mulligan in Atlas Shrugged, based on Ayn Rand's novel of the same name. He played Russell Dunbar's wealthy father in Rules of Engagement and he had a recurring role as the mysterious Mr. Smith on Castle. In 2014 he appeared in an episode of Suburgatory.

In 2015, he co-starred as Defense Secretary Pierce Grey on HBO's The Brink. He starred in the ABC and Netflix political thriller Designated Survivor, where he portrayed Former President of the United States and Secretary of State Cornelius Moss alongside Kiefer Sutherland.

== Filmography ==
=== Film ===
Film
Year	Title	Role	Notes
1995	Two Bits	Dr. Wilson	
1997	Leave It to Beaver	Coach Gordon	
1998	The Right Way	Michael Peretti	
2001	Behind Enemy Lines	Admiral Donnelly	
2001	Venomous	General Arthur Manchek	
2004	Spartan	Pearce	
2005	The Poseidon Adventure	Admiral Jennings	TV movie
2006	Stay	Dad	
2007	D-War	Secretary of Defense	
2007	Already Dead	Pierce	
2008	A Line in the Sand	The Mayor	
2008	Changeling	S.S. Hahn	
2008	Get Smart	Vice President	
2009	World's Greatest Dad	Principal Anderson	
2009	Better off Ted	Elijah Palmer	
2011	Atlas Shrugged: Part I	Michael 'Midas' Mulligan	
2011	Something Borrowed	Dexter Thaler Sr.	
2011	God Bless America	Frank's Boss	
2011	J. Edgar	A. Mitchell Palmer	
2011	Jack and Jill	Carter Simmons	
2014	Revenge of the Green Dragons	FBI Director Sam Higgins	
2014	You're Not You	Kate's Father	
2016	Rules Don't Apply	Merrill Lynch Executive	
2020	The Wrong Missy	Jack Winstone	
2024	Watchmen Chapter 1	Hollis Mason / Nite Owl I (voice)	Direct-to-Video
2024	Watchmen Chapter 2	Hollis Mason / Nite Owl I, Prison Guard #1 (voice)	Direct-to-Video

=== Television ===
Television
Years	Title	Role	Notes
1980–1981	Texas	Detective Donovan	19 episodes
1983–1985	Ryan's Hope	Frank Ryan	126 episodes
1985	The Equalizer	Lawyer	Episode: "Bump and Run"
1989	Days of Our Lives	Barney Gillespie	4 episodes
1993	The Adventures of Pete & Pete	Mr. Perfect	1 episode: "King of the Road" (Season 1)
1994–1998	Grace Under Fire	Jimmy Kelly	30 episodes
1995–1999	Unhappily Ever After	Jack Malloy	100 episodes
2000–2001	Nash Bridges	Deputy Chief Max Petit	3 episodes
2001	Becker	Mr. Tipton	1 episode
2001	Friends	Mr Franklin	1 episode: "The One with Rachel's Date" (Season 8)
2002	That '80s Show	R.T. Howard	13 episodes
2002–2003	The West Wing	Senate Minority Leader Tripplehorn	4 episodes
2003	The Drew Carey Show		1 episode: "Two Days of the Condo"
2003–2005	24	Senator John Keeler / President John Keeler	20 episodes
2004	Monk	Harry Bolston	1 episode
2005–2008	Rodney	Dale Hamilton	3 episodes
2005	Desperate Housewives	Sam	1 episode: "Live Alone and Like It" (Season 1)
2006	Criminal Minds	Max Ryan	1 episode
2006	NCIS	Roy Carver	1 episode
2008	Medium	Sam Winters	1 episode
2008	It's Always Sunny in Philadelphia	Warden	1 episode
2009	The Mentalist	Noah Plaskett	1 episode
2012	The Firm	Judge Ken Walsh	4 episodes
2010–2012	Boardwalk Empire	Senator Walter Edge	4 episodes
2006–2013	Dexter	Tom Matthews	43 episodes
2012; 2019–2022	Young Justice	Jay Garrick / The Flash	Voice; 5 episodes
2015	The Brink	Pierce Gray	10 episodes
2011–2015	Castle	Michael Smith	6 episodes
2016	Person of Interest	FBI SAIC Roberts	1 episode
2017–2019	Designated Survivor	Cornelius Moss	16 episodes
2018–2019	Splitting Up Together	Henry	13 episodes
2019	Homeland	Senator Richard Eames	1 episode
2019	The Face of Evil	Narrator	6 episodes
2022	The Terminal List	Senator Joe Pryor	1 episode
2023	City on Fire	Bill Sr	7 episodes
2025	9-1-1	Lewis Kern	3 episodes
2026	Scrubs	Mr. Walton	1 episode
2026	Margo's Got Money Troubles	Lawrence J. Boch	3 episodes

=== Video games ===
Video games
Year	Title	Role	Notes	Source
2025	Like a Dragon: Pirate Yakuza in Hawaii	Spade Tucker		
