= Billy Brown (actor) =

American actor (born 1970)

- Born: October 30, 1970 (age 55); Inglewood, California, United States
- Occupation: Actor
- Years active: 1993–present

Billy Brown (born October 30, 1970) is an American actor best known for his lead roles as Richard 'Death Row' Reynolds on the FX sports drama series Lights Out (2011), Archer Petit on the CBS drama series Hostages (2013–14), and Detective Nate Lahey on the ABC legal drama series How to Get Away with Murder (2014–20). He is also known for his supporting roles as Detective Mike Anderson on the sixth and seventh seasons of the Showtime crime thriller series Dexter (2011–12), and August Marks on the fifth, sixth, and seventh seasons of the FX action crime drama series Sons of Anarchy (2012–14).

== Early life ==
Brown was born and raised in Inglewood, California.

== Career ==
He is known for his role as detective Mike Anderson on Showtime's Dexter from 2011 to 2012. Previously he starred as boxer Richard "Death Row" Reynolds in the short-lived FX series Lights Out. In 2012, he landed the recurring role of August Marks in the fifth and sixth season of Sons of Anarchy. He also provided the second voice of Cliffjumper in the animated series Transformers: Prime. In 2013, he portrayed Agent Troy Riley in the first season of The Following.

Brown starred opposite Toni Collette in the CBS drama series Hostages from 2013-14. In 2014, he was cast opposite Viola Davis in ABC drama How to Get Away with Murder, produced by Shonda Rhimes.

In 2018, Brown was cast in his first film leading role in the Screen Gems' thriller Proud Mary opposite Taraji P. Henson.

Brown also voices recruiting commercials for the United States Marine Corps.

== Filmography ==
=== Film ===
Year	Title	Role	Notes
1993	Geronimo: An American Legend	Native American	
1993	Dreamrider	Boy in Boston	
1997	The Beautician and the Beast	Fireman	
1997	The Lost World: Jurassic Park	InGen Worker	
2001	Second Coming	—N/a	
2002	The Wild Thornberrys Movie	Rhino	Voice
2005	House of the Dead 2	Griffin	
2008	I Am Bubba	Bubba	Short film
2008	Cloverfield	Staff Sgt. Pryce	
2008	Lakeview Terrace	Patrolman	
2009	Race to Witch Mountain	Mr. Carson	
2009	Star Trek	Med Evac Pilot	
2018	Proud Mary	Tom Spencer	
2018	Suicide Squad: Hell to Pay	Ben Turner / Bronze Tiger	Voice
2020	Working Man	Walter Brewer	

=== Television ===
Year	Title	Role	Notes
2000–03	As Told by Ginger	Mr. Patterson / Delivery Guy	4 episodes
2004	Starship Troopers 2: Hero of the Federation	Private Ottis Brick	Television film
2004	CSI: NY	George Thomas	Episode: "Grand Master"
2004	NCIS	Chief Petty Officer Velat	Episode: "Heart Break"
2005	Cold Case	Donald Williams	Episode: "Strange Fruit"
2005–06	E-Ring	MSgt. Meeks	3 episodes
2007	Criminal Minds	Det. Ware	Episode: "Fear and Loathing"
2007	Backyards & Bullets	Craig Winslow	Unsold TV pilot
2007–08	Dirt	Tweety McDaniel	3 episodes
2009	Southland	Talib	2 episodes
2009	Californication	Marcy's Date	Episode: "The Land of Rape and Honey"
2010	CSI: NY	Business Pedestrian	Episode: "Unfriendly Chat"
2011	Reconstruction	Sam	Unsold TV pilot
2011	Lights Out	Richard 'Death Row' Reynolds	11 episodes
2012	Law & Order: Special Victims Unit	Joe Marshall	Episode: "Official Story"
2011–12	Dexter	Det. Mike Anderson	11 episodes
2012	Transformers Prime	Cliffjumper	Episode: "Out of the Past"
2013	The Following	Troy Riley	3 episodes
2012–14	Sons of Anarchy	August Marks	14 episodes
2013–14	Hostages	Archer Petit	15 episodes
2014	Legends	Robert McCombs	Episode: "Rogue"
2014–20	How to Get Away with Murder	Detective Nate Lahey	90 episodes
2015	Adventure Time	The Vampire King	3 episodes
2023-25	Adventure Time: Fionna and Cake	The Vampire King	2 episodes
2026	High Potential	Charles Hale	Episode: "Family Tree"

=== Video games ===
Year	Title	Role	Notes
2000	Jet Set Radio	DJ Professor K	
2002	Jet Set Radio Future	DJ Professor K	
2004	Hot Shots Golf Fore!	T-Bone	
2004	Star Wars: Knights of the Old Republic 2	Zez-Kai Ell	
2007	Command & Conquer 3: Tiberium Wars	Nod Announcer	
2012	Sonic & All-Stars Racing Transformed	DJ Professor K	Archive footage
2018	SEGA Heroes	DJ Professor K	Archive footage

== Awards and nominations ==
Year	Association	Category	Nominated work	Result
2012	Screen Actors Guild Awards	Outstanding Performance by an Ensemble in a Drama Series	Dexter	Nominated
