= Lauren Vélez =

American actress (born 1964)

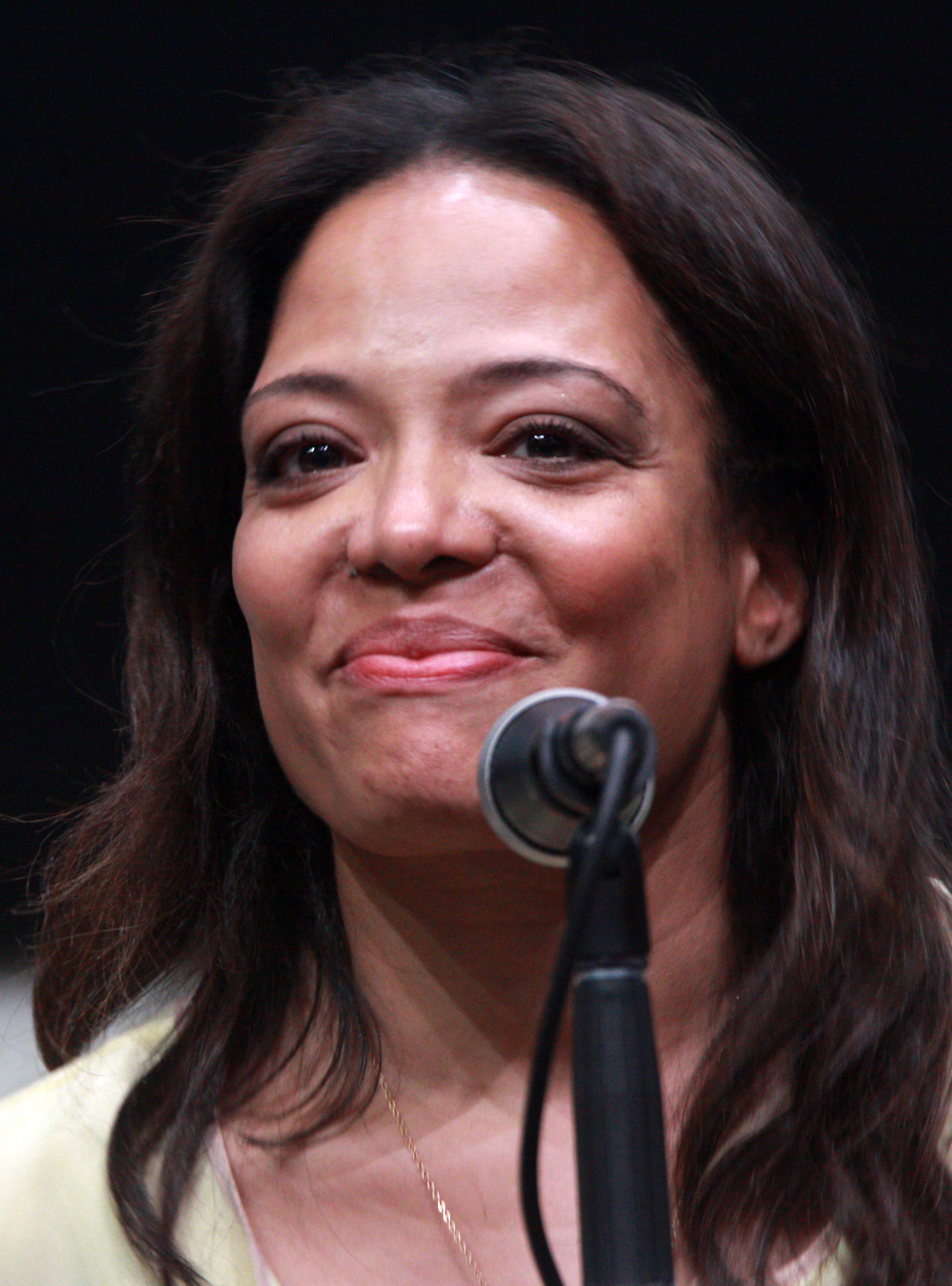
- Vélez at the 2013 San Diego Comic-Con
- Born: Luna Lauren Vélez; November 2, 1964 (age 61); Brooklyn, New York City, U.S.
- Occupation: Actress
- Years active: 1983–present
- Spouse: Mark Gordon (m. 1993; div. 2015)
- Relatives: Lorraine Vélez (twin sister)

Luna Lauren Vélez (born November 2, 1964) is an American actress. Her most notable television roles are as María LaGuerta on Showtime's Dexter, Detective Nina Moreno on Fox's New York Undercover, Dr. Gloria Nathan on HBO's prison drama Oz, and Elena on ABC's comedy-drama Ugly Betty. She also starred as Rio Morales in Spider-Man: Into the Spider-Verse (2018) and Spider-Man: Across the Spider-Verse (2023).

== Early life and education ==
In the early 1950s, Vélez's parents moved from Puerto Rico to Brooklyn, New York City, where she and her identical twin sister, Lorraine Vélez, were born. The twins have five other sisters and one brother. Vélez's father, a New York City Police Department officer, eventually bought a house in Far Rockaway, Queens, and moved the family there. The twins staged improvised plays and acting for the family and participated in nearly all their high school drama productions, such as Fiddler on the Roof. After graduating from Beach Channel High School in 1982, they received scholarships to attend the Alvin Ailey Dance School. They went on to study acting at The Acting Studio - New York with its founding artistic director James Price, protégé and personal friend of Sanford Meisner. Lauren also studied Shakespeare with Michael Howard.

== Career ==
Vélez landed her first performing job in the national touring company of the musical Dreamgirls. She was also an understudy for actress Phylicia Rashad in Stephen Sondheim's Into the Woods, and performed Off-Broadway in productions of Much Ado About Nothing.

In 1994, Vélez made her film debut as Lisette Linares in the movie I Like It Like That alongside Rita Moreno and Jon Seda. She was nominated for the Independent Spirit Award and The Desi Award for Best Lead Actress. The movie was nominated for four Independent Spirit Awards and won an NYFCCA award. In 1995, Vélez landed her first major television role as Nina Moreno, a policewoman, in the TV series New York Undercover. Another TV series in which she performed was HBO's jail drama Oz. She also acted in the feature film City Hall (1996) with Al Pacino. In 1997, she starred in Buscando un Sueño (In Search of a Dream), the first Spanish-language film sanctioned by SAG. She played police lieutenant María LaGuerta, in a major supporting role on Showtime's series Dexter.

On June 24, 2006, Vélez won the Best Supporting Actress award at the 2006 Long Island International Film Expo for her performance as Roseanne Crystal in the independent feature film Serial.

In 2010, she received the Rita Moreno HOLA Award for Excellence from the Hispanic Organization of Latin Actors (HOLA).

== Filmography ==
Key
†	Denotes films that have not yet been released

=== Film ===
Year	Title	Role	Notes
1994	I Like It Like That	Lisette Linares	Independent Spirit Awards for Best Female Lead
1996	City Hall	Elaine Santos	Nominated – NCLR Bravo Award for Outstanding Actress in a Drama Series
1997	I Think I Do	Carol	Nominated — ALMA Award for Outstanding Actress in a Feature Film
2000	Prince of Central Park	Rosa Sanchez	
2001	Prison Song	Prison Counselor	
2007	Serial	Roseanne Crystal	Long Island International Film Expo for Best Supporting Actress
2011	Rosewood Lane	Paula Crenshaw	
2016	Officer Downe	Chief Berringer	
2016	America Adrift	Cecilia Fernandez	
2018	The First Purge	Luisa	
2018	Spider-Man: Into the Spider-Verse	Rio Morales (voice)	
2019	Swallow	Lucy	
2019	Shaft	Bennie	
2019	Windows on the World	Eva	
2020	Ana	Camila	
2021	Rogue Hostage	Sunshine	
2023	Spider-Man: Across the Spider-Verse	Rio Morales (voice)	
2023	Transformers: Rise of the Beasts	Breanna Diaz	
2027	Spider-Man: Beyond the Spider-Verse †	Rio Morales (voice)	In production

=== Television ===
Year	Title	Role	Notes
1995	The Cosby Mysteries	Claudine Palmeri	"The Hit Parade"
1995–1999	New York Undercover	Lourdes / Det. Nina Moreno	Guest role (season 1); Main role (seasons 2–4)
1997–2003	Oz	Dr. Gloria Nathan	Guest (season 1), recurring role (seasons 2–6)
1998	Thicker Than Blood	Camilla Lopez	Television film Nominated – ALMA Award for Outstanding Actress in Made-for Television Movie or Mini-Series
1999	Strange World	Det. Arias	"Azrael's Breed"
1999	St. Michael's Crossing	Vicki Solera	TV series
1999	Law & Order	Ms. Torres	"Marathon"
2000	The Pretender	Emily Sadler	"Spin Doctor"
2000	Profiler	Emily Sadler	"Clean Sweep"
2001	Love and Treason	Agent Susan Mestre	Television film
2003	Dragnet	Det. Denise Beltran	"Redemption," "For Whom the Whistle Blows"
2004	Law & Order: Special Victims Unit	Attorney Shamal	"Home", "Obscene"
2005	Strong Medicine	Dr. Vanessa Burke	"First Response"
2005	Wanted	Faye Templeton	"The Last Templeton"
2006	Medium	Elena Cabrera	"Knowing Her"
2006–2007	Numbers	Claudia Gomez	"Undercurrents", "Hardball", "Contenders"
2006–2012	Dexter	María LaGuerta	Main role (seasons 1–7)
2008	Law & Order: Criminal Intent	Officer Lois Melago	"Purgatory"
2009–2010	Ugly Betty	Elena	Recurring role (seasons 3–4)
2011	Breakout Kings	Carmen Vega	"Where in the World Is Carmen Vega"
2011	Hawthorne	Dr. Kat	"For Better or Worse"
2014	Unforgettable	Aisha Conway	"Fire and Ice"
2015	South of Hell	Tetra	Main role
2016	Elementary	Zoe Mercado	"Art Imitates Art"
2016–2017	How to Get Away with Murder	Soraya Hargrove	Recurring role (season 3), guest (season 4)
2017	Madam Secretary	Natalia Moreno	"Labor of Love"
2017–2018	Blue Bloods	Special Agent Veronica Molina	"The Thin Blue Line," "By Hook or by Crook"
2017	MacGyver	Cassandra Glover	"Packing Peanuts + Fire", "CD-ROM + Hoagie Foil", "War Room + Ship"
2018	Murder	Capt. Lili Alvarez	TV film, pre-production
2022–2023	Power Book II: Ghost	Evelyn Castillo	Guest (season 2), recurring (season 3)
2022–2023	East New York	Tamika Martin	Recurring
2024	American Rust	Detective Angela Burgos	Main role (season 2)

=== Theatre ===
Year	Title	Role	Notes
1983–84	Dreamgirls	Stepp Sister/Ensemble	Tour
1985–87	Dreamgirls	Stepp Sister/Sweetheart/Ensemble; Michelle Morris (u/s)	Tour
1988–89	Into the Woods	The Witch (u/s)	Broadway
2024	The Other Americans	Patti	Arena Stage, Washington, D.C.

== See also ==
- List of Afro-Latinos
- List of Puerto Ricans
