= BuddyTV =

Entertainment website

- Owner: Aprospectus LLC
- Creator: Various contributors
- Website: www.buddytv.com
- Launched: July 31, 2007
- Current status: Online

BuddyTV is an entertainment-based website, which generates content about television programs and sporting events. The website publishes information about celebrity and related entertainment news through a series of articles, entertainment profiles, actor biographies and user forums. On 31 December 2014, Smart TV manufacturer VIZIO acquired BuddyTV's parent Advanced Media Research Group, Inc., in order to expand content and service offerings. The site was shut down on 22 May 2018. The site was later relaunched on 30 August 2021 by a small web content company with the intent to resurrect BuddyTV.

== History ==
BuddyTV was co-founded in 2005 by Andy Liu and David Niu. The pair graduated from the University of Pennsylvania with a Master of Business Administration. They sold their previous company, NetConversions, to aQuantive in 2004. While on a holiday, they realized that television is a "very passive or non-social experience", and wanted to "express ourselves at the time of the show". The website is also designed to allow real-time commentary for sports, allowing former players and fans to broadcast their opinions on basketball and baseball games. Niu felt that other Internet companies which were offering online sportscasting tools did not effectively combine audio broadcasts with online comments and forums.

In May 2007, BuddyTV received a loan of $250,000 from the Charles River Quick Start Seed Funding Program, at which time it was attracting 2 million unique visitors per month. In a first round financing, Gemstar-TV Guide International invested $2.8 million into the website. In September 2007, paidContent reported that BuddyTV was being acquired by Comcast, at which time it was receiving 3 million unique visitors per month and had hired 20 employees. However, the reports were later confirmed to be untrue. In April 2008, BuddyTV raised $6 million in a second round, with investments mainly coming from Madrona Venture Group. The two rounds saw a total raise of $9 million. Funding was expected to go towards investing in new personnel and technology.

BuddyTV has been compared to the television commentary site Television Without Pity. Television Without Pity's co-editor Sarah Bunting said that the website's focus is on in-depth and humorous recaps that appear three or four days after the episodes air. BuddyTV is designed, however, to provide immediate feedback. Liu said that many television networks were interested in partnering with BuddyTV to build online communities around their shows.

In September 2010, BuddyTV entered the mobile space with a new app for the iPhone and iPad. "We're making a big bet on the mobile and tablet side of things," said CEO Andy Liu. "When I watch TV, I've got my iPad open, I've got mobile phones nearby as well, and I think in the next 12 to 18 months this whole movement towards being a lot more social in television is really going to come together, and we just want to get ahead of that. It's amazing how much hardware has changed this space."

Soon after its first mobile app release, Seattle entrepreneur and technology executive Bill Baxter joined BuddyTV as its chief technology officer and executive vice president of products. A year later, the app was featured in TechCrunch.

On 31 December 2014, Smart TV manufacturer Vizio acquired BuddyTV's parent Advanced Media Research Group, Inc. Three and a half years later on 22 May 2018, the website went offline. The site has since relaunched under new management.

== Business model ==
BuddyTV made money through online advertising and by offering advanced publishing tools to commentators. The website had a partnership with Windows Media Center, allowing viewers to turn on BuddyTV commentary on their televisions during shows. In 2007, online survey hosting company QuestionPro and Buddy TV created a new way for advertisers to learn about the viewers of television series which featured their ads. BuddyTV used custom online surveys from QuestionPro to gather information and opinion from the community of fans. BuddyTV's analysts compiled the results and produced a report within days for the advertiser.

In June 2010, BuddyTV entered an advertising partnership with Flixster and Rotten Tomatoes. "This is a terrific partnership that capitalizes on each company's growth in social networking, mobile, and online to reach a huge and influential audience of trendsetting consumers," said Joe Greenstein, co-founder and CEO of Flixster Inc. "For us, we now have a large and professional sales force to sell our inventory directly to agencies and advertisers," said BuddyTV's Neal Freeland. "We already have some of these relationships, but expect this partnership to grow the volume significantly."

== Impact ==
In 2007 Business Wire named BuddyTV as "the Web's best entertainment-based community site". The website contained information about 410 television series, and provided content to the Seattle Post-Intelligencer. Co-founder Liu described it in 2007 as the "largest independent TV fan site". In March and April 2007, BuddyTV was the seventh most visited website in the Seattle startup index.

== See also ==
- TV Squad
