= Aimee Garcia =

American actress (born 1978)

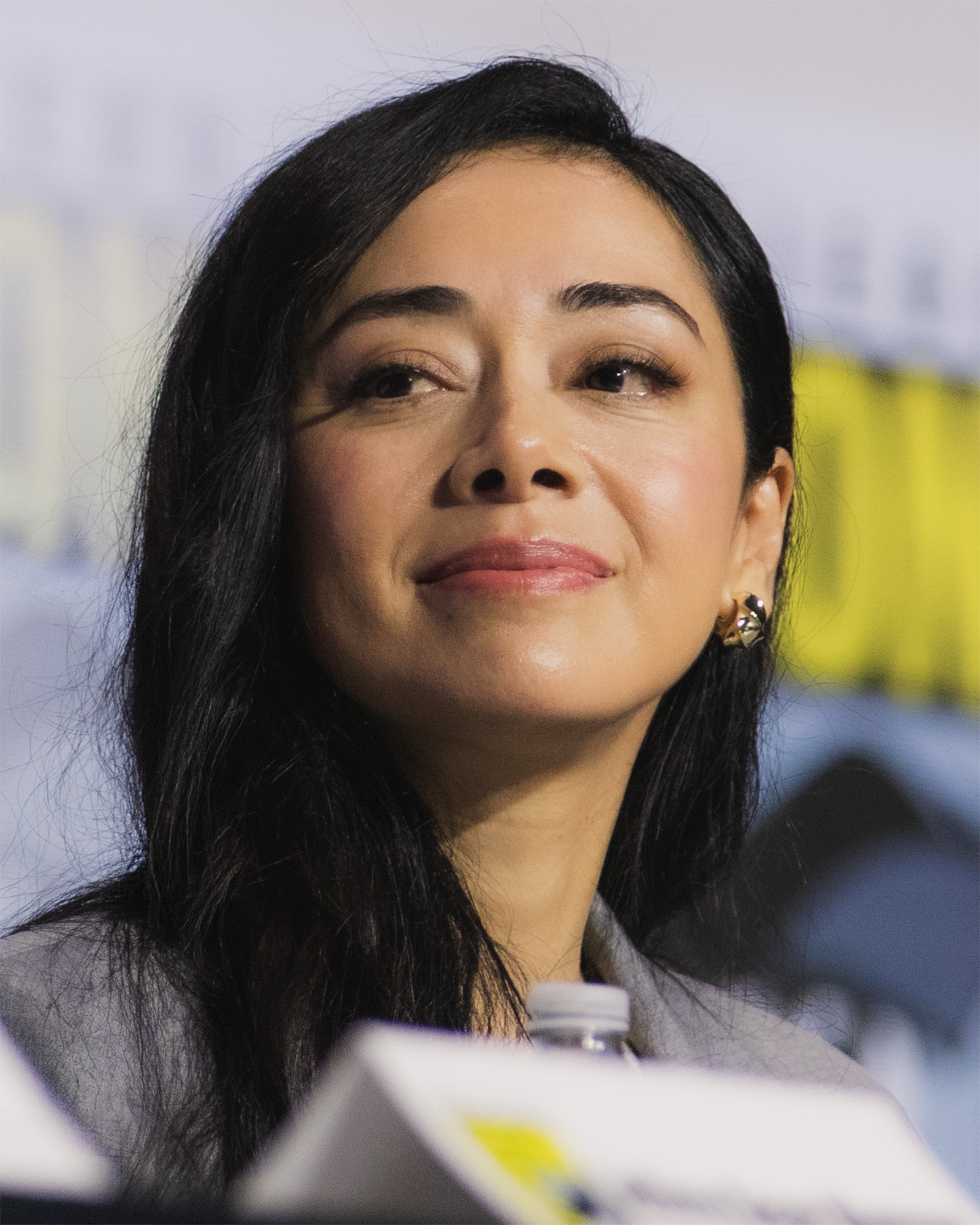
- Garcia in 2026
- Born: Aimee Sandimés Garcia López de Ordóñez; November 28, 1978 (age 47); Chicago, Illinois, U.S.
- Occupations: Actress; filmmaker; writer
- Years active: 1996–present

Aimee Sandimés Garcia López de Ordóñez (born November 28, 1978) is an American actress, filmmaker, and writer. She is known for her television roles as Veronica Palmero in George Lopez (2006–2007), Jamie Batista in Dexter (2011–2013), Yvonne Sanchez in Vegas (2012–2013), and Ella Lopez in Lucifer (2016–2021).

== Early life ==
Aimee Sandimés Garcia López de Ordóñez was born in Chicago on November 28, 1978, the daughter of Eloisa and Hector. Her mother is Mexican, from Pachuca, and graduated from Northwestern University's dental school; her father is Puerto Rican, from San Juan, and served in the military. Garcia started acting in commercials as a child, and participated in theater at seven years old. She grew up in Oak Park, Illinois, where she graduated from Fenwick High School in 1996. While in school, she took acting classes at the Piven Theatre Workshop. She appeared in local plays and musicals during her time at Northwestern University, where she triple majored in economics, journalism, and French. She appeared in some films and television series, but quit acting for a year and worked for a mutual fund analyst in Brooklyn. Unsatisfied, she moved to Los Angeles in 2002 to pursue acting.

== Career ==
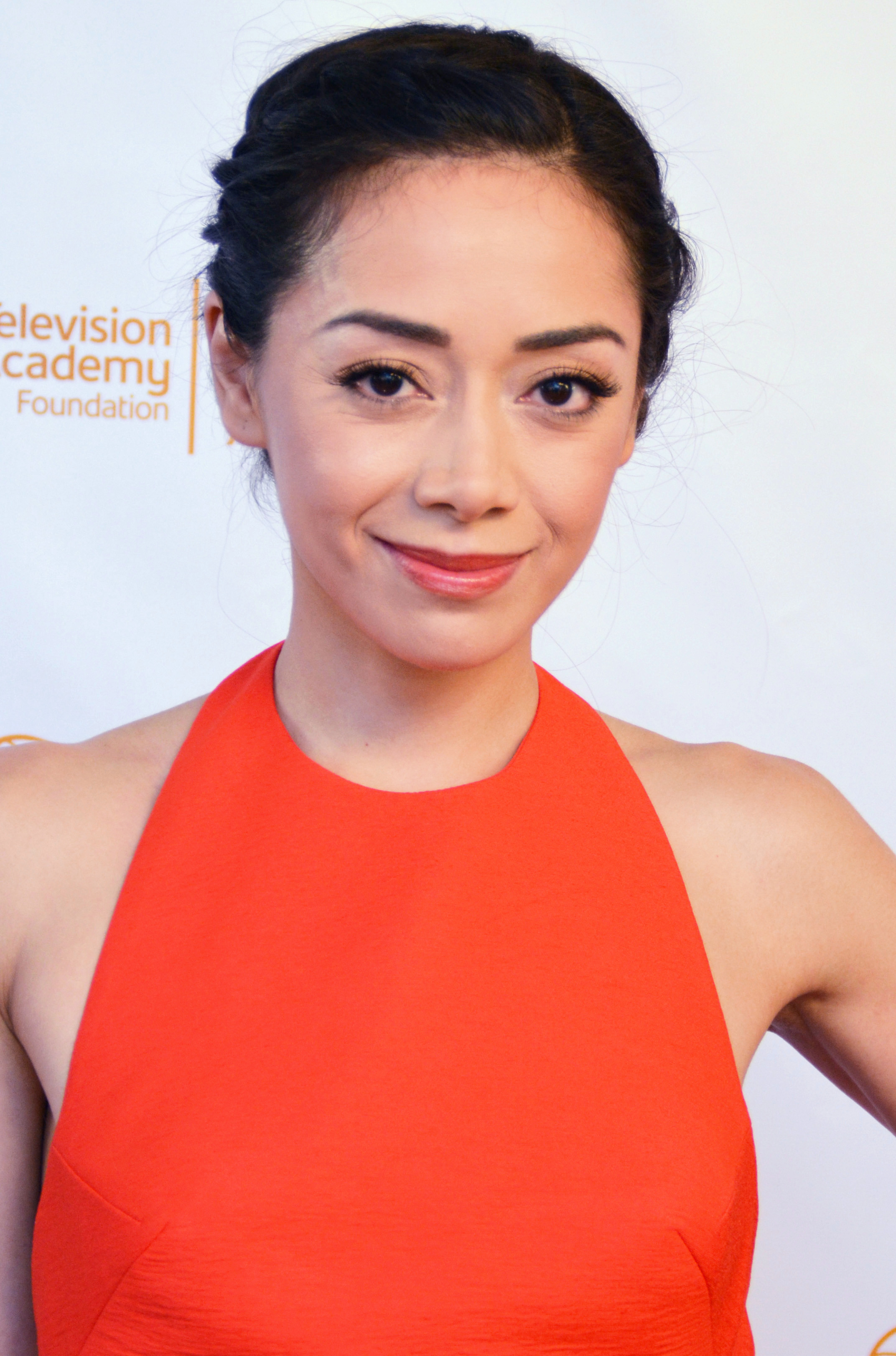
Garcia in 2014

Garcia portrayed Maria on The WB's Greetings from Tucson, and appeared in the unaired pilot episode of Global Frequency. She had a role in the Disney Channel original movie Cadet Kelly (2002), and co-starred, as Lydia, alongside Anthony Anderson in The WB sitcom All About the Andersons. In 2006, she began appearing on the series George Lopez, playing Lopez's niece.

Garcia starred alongside Jessica Simpson in the comedy-drama Major Movie Star (2008). She also played a supporting role in the movie D-War (2007) and narrated the Adam Sandler film Spanglish (2004).

From 2009 to 2010, she was in the cast of the Peter Berg NBC medical drama Trauma, as EMT helicopter pilot Marisa Benez.

Garcia spent three years on Showtime's Dexter as Jamie Batista, for which she was nominated for a SAG Award for Best Ensemble in Dramatic Television Series.

She played Dr. Jae Kim in MGM's reboot film, RoboCop (2014).

In 2016, Garcia was added to the main cast for the second season of the Fox television series Lucifer, playing LAPD forensic scientist Ella Lopez. In 2019, Garcia starred in the independent film El Chicano, receiving praise from The Hollywood Reporter for her performance's "vivid impression".

In 2019, Garcia formed a writing partnership with former professional wrestler AJ Mendez. Their first project was the comic book series GLOW vs. The Babyface, based on the television series GLOW; the first of four issues was published by IDW Publishing in November 2019. In 2020, they created the production company Scrappy Heart Productions, dedicated to elevating diverse voices through storytelling. They went on to co-write the Dungeons & Dragons four-issue limited series At the Spine of the World; the first issue was published by IDW in November 2020. Alongside John Swetman, they co-wrote the screenplay for the 2022 Netflix film Blade of the 47 Ronin.

From 2021 to 2023, she voiced Alex Gonzalez in the DreamWorks Peacock animated series Dragons: The Nine Realms. In 2022, she starred in Netflix movie Christmas with You with Freddie Prinze Jr.

== Personal life ==
Garcia has lived in Los Angeles since 2002.

In May 2021, Garcia joined the ownership group of the Chicago Red Stars women's soccer team.

== Filmography ==
Key
†	Denotes films that have not yet been released

=== Film ===
Year	Title	Role	Notes
1996	The Homecoming	Jodi	
2001	Betaville	Ruby Derain (young)	
2002	The Good Girl	Nurse	
2003	Boys Life 4: Four Play	Caitlan	Segment: "L.T.R."
2004	D.E.B.S.	Maria	
2004	Chicago Boricua	Lola	
2004	Spanglish	Cristina Moreno (voice) / Narrator	
2005	A Lot Like Love	Nicole	
2005	Cruel World	Gina	
2005	Dirty	Rita	
2006	The Alibi	Operator #1	
2006	Mercy Street	Alicia Johnson	
2007	Graduation	Suzy Winters	
2007	D-War	Brandy	
2007	Dead Tone	Jody Walters	
2008	Universal Signs	Trish	
2008	Private Valentine: Blonde & Dangerous	Private Vicky Castillo	
2009	Shrink	Check out Girl	
2009	B-Girl	Rosie	
2011	Convincing Clooney	Amy	
2011	Go for It!	Carmen Salgado	
2014	RoboCop	Jae Kim	
2016	Sister Cities	Sarah	
2018	What They Had	Dr. Zoe	
2018	Saint Judy	Celi	
2019	El Chicano	Vanessa	
2019	The Addams Family	Denise (voice)	
2021	Dear Evan Hansen	Librarian	
2022	Murder at Yellowstone City	Isabel Santos	
2022	Blade of the 47 Ronin	—	Co-writer
2022	Christmas With You	Angelina	
2023	The Cases of Mystery Lane	Birdie Case	
2025	Aimee Comes First	Aimee	Short film Writer, director, and producer
2025	Saurus City	Elisabeth (voice)	
2026	Chasing Summer	Amanda	

=== Television ===
Year	Title	Role	Notes
1999	ER	Leanne Lawler	Episode: "Truth & Consequences"
2001	Resurrection Blvd.	Sylvia	Episode: "La Partida"
2001	The Agency	Motel Housekeeper	2 episodes
2001	V.I.P.	Receptionist	Episode: "The Uncle from V.A.L."
2002	Cadet Kelly	Gloria	Disney Channel Original Movie
2002	Angel	Cynthia York	Episode: "Birthday"
2002	American Family	Young Nina	5 episodes
2002	MDs	Gina Willis	Episode: "Time of Death"
2002–2003	Greetings from Tucson	Maria Tiant	Main role
2003–2004	All About the Andersons	Lydia Serrano	Main role
2004	Las Vegas	Lizzie Posner	Episode: "Nevada State"
2005	CSI: NY	Rhonda Chavez	Episode: "City of the Dolls"
2006	Lovespring International	Sparkles	Episode: "Homeless Rockstar"
2006–2007	George Lopez	Veronica Palmero	Main role (seasons 5–6)
2007	CSI: Crime Scene Investigation	Melissa Gentry	Episode: "Big Shots"
2007	Standoff	Tina Markovich	Episode: "Severance"
2008	Supernatural	Nancy Fitzgerald	Episode: "Jus in Bello"
2008	My Boys	Amy	Episode: "Take My Work Wife... Please"
2008	CSI: Miami	Andrea Rinell	Episode: "Won't Get Fueled Again"
2009	Gary Unmarried	Anna	Episode: "Gary and Dennis' Sister"
2009	Bones	Jennifer Keating	Episode: "The Science in the Physicist"
2009, 2017	Family Guy	Nicole, Isabella	Episode: "Brian's Got a Brand New Bag", "Dearly Deported"
2009–2010	Trauma	Marisa Benez	Main role
2010	Beach Lane	Holly	
2011	Off the Map	Alma	5 episodes
2011	Love Bites	Steffi	Episode: "Boys to Men"
2011	Hawaii Five-0	Karla	Episode: "Pahele"
2011–2013	Dexter	Jamie Batista	Main role (seasons 6–8)
2012–2013	Vegas	Yvonne Sanchez	14 episodes
2012–2013	Motorcity	Tennie (voice)	3 episodes
2014	About a Boy	Stacy	Episode: "About an Angry Ex"
2015	Impastor	Leeane	2 episodes
2016	Rush Hour	Didi Diaz	Main role
2016–2021	Lucifer	Ella Lopez	Main role (seasons 2–6)
2021	M.O.D.O.K.	Jodie (voice)	Main role
2021	Holiday in Santa Fe	Magdalena Ortega	
2021–2023	DreamWorks Dragons: The Nine Realms	Alex Gonzalez (voice)	Main role
2022	Woke	Laura	Main role (season 2)
2025	Criminal Minds: Evolution	Dr. Julia Ochoa	7 episodes
2026	The Walking Dead: Dead City	Renata DeLeon	Main role (season 3); 7 episodes

== Bibliography ==
- GLOW vs. The Babyface, with AJ Mendez, illustrated by Hannah Templer (IDW Publishing, June 2020, ISBN 978-1684056309)
- Dungeons & Dragons: At the Spine of the World, with AJ Mendez, illustrated by Martin Coccolo and Katrina Mae Hao (IDW Publishing, July 2021, ISBN 978-1-68405-791-7)
- Wonder Woman: Black and Gold #3: "The Stolen Lasso of Truth", illustrated by Sebastian Fiumara (co-feature, DC Comics, August 2021)
- Day of the Dead Girl, with AJ Mendez, illustrated by Belén Culebras (Magma Comix, October 2024)
- East Side Saints, with AJ Mendez and Ildy Modrovich, illustrated by Amilcar Pinna, colored by Amanda Grazini (Ignition Press, 2027)

== Accolades ==
Year	Association	Category	Nominated work	Result	Ref.
2007	ALMA Awards	Outstanding Supporting Actress – Television Series, Mini-Series, or TV Movie	George Lopez	Nominated	
2007	Imagen Awards	Best Supporting Actress – Television	George Lopez	Nominated	
2012	Screen Actors Guild	Outstanding Performance by an Ensemble in a Drama Series	Dexter	Nominated	
2013	ALMA Awards	Special Achievement in Television (shared with Lauren Vélez and David Zayas)	Dexter	Won	
