= Love Locked Out =

Painting by Anna Lea Merritt

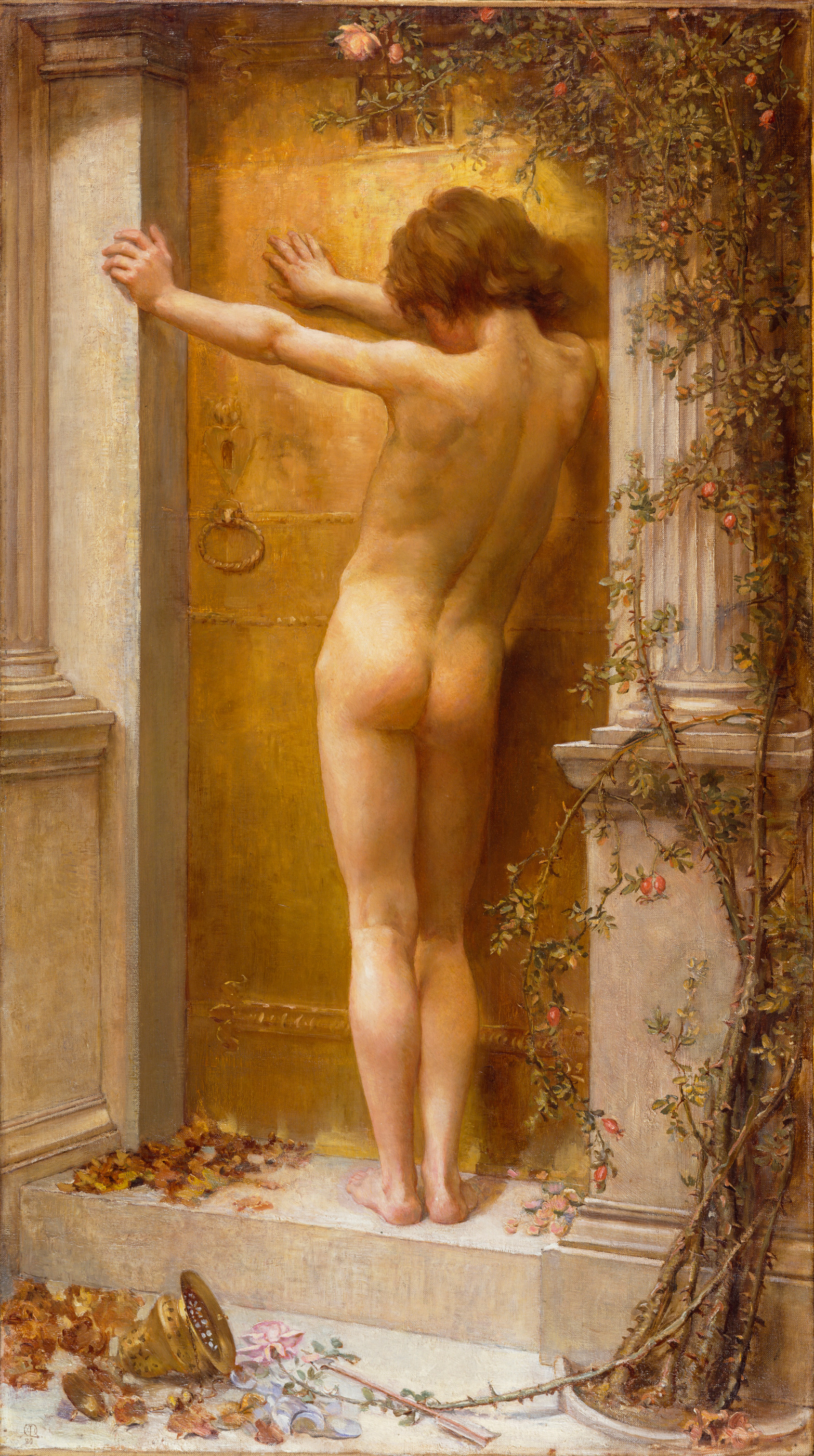
- Artist: Anna Lea Merritt
- Completion date: 1890
- Type: genre art
- Medium: oil paint
- Subject: Cupid
- Dimensions: 115.6 cm × 64.1 cm (45.5 in × 25.2 in)
- Location: Tate Britain, London
- Accession: N01578
- Website: TATE online

Love Locked Out is an oil painting by Anna Lea Merritt first exhibited at the Royal Academy in 1890 and which became the first painting by a woman artist acquired for the British national collection through the Chantrey Bequest.

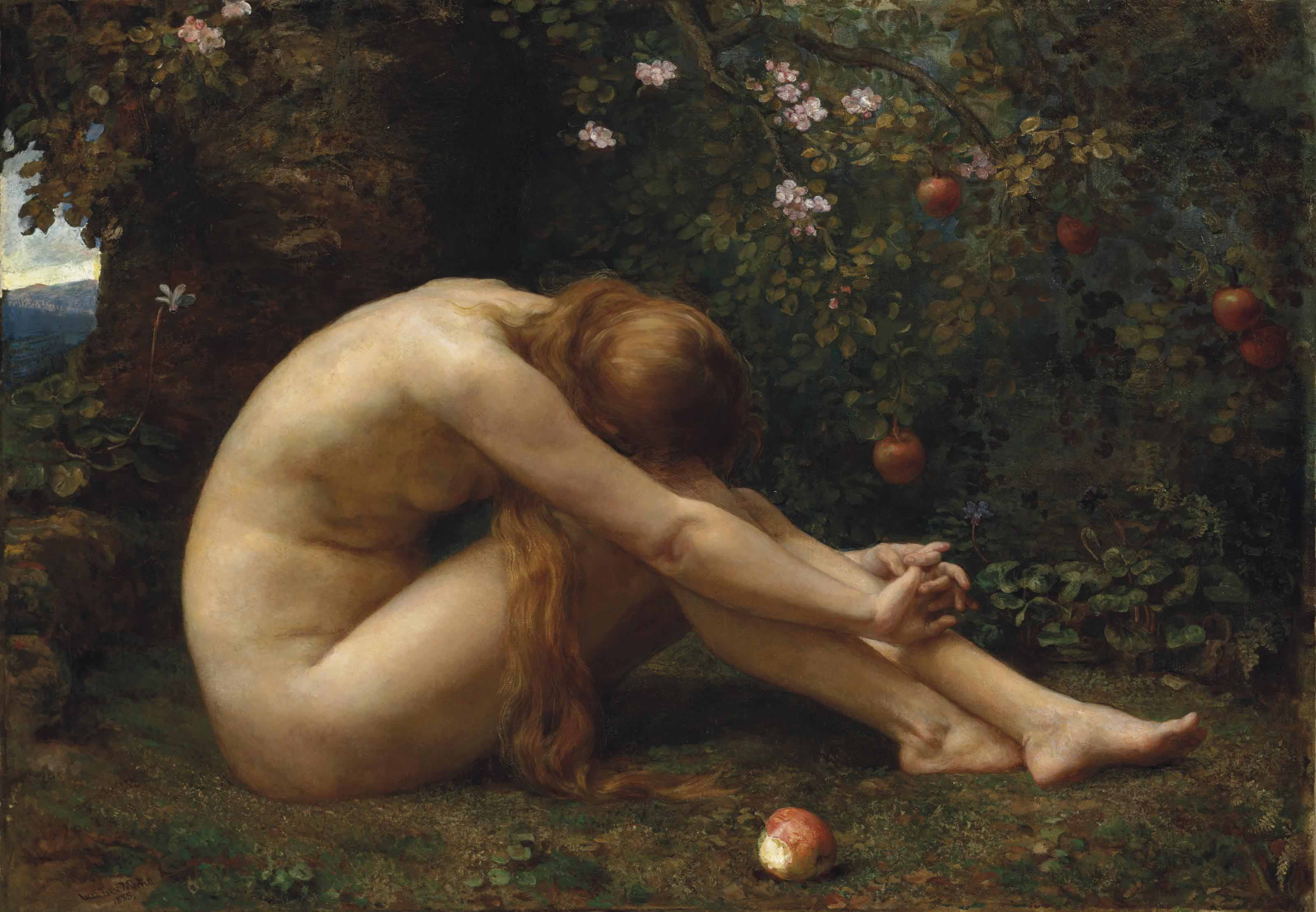
Eve Overcome with Remorse, 1885

The painting of Cupid standing before a locked door was well received when it was shown. Merritt's first painting of a nude model, Eve Overcome with Remorse, had met with unfavourable reviews after winning a medal at the Royal Academy in 1885 but this painting, which was created as a memorial to her husband, was received favourably, though it again featured a nude model - and this time the model was male, a controversial subject for women artists at that time. Merritt escaped censure by choosing a child to portray Cupid, rather than an adult, such as her Eve had been.

As a notable work by an American painter, Love Locked Out was included in the 1905 book Women Painters of the World. The title also became the title for the compilation of Anna Lea Merritt's memoirs, published by Galina Gorokhoff in 1982.

The piece was purchased in 1890 by the Chantry fund, London, for £250 (after inflation, would be equivalent to ~£26,300 in 2023). Clara Erskine Clement, an American author noted that ".. this honor has been accorded to few women, and of these I think Mrs. Merritt was first."
