= Tate Britain =

Art museum in London, England

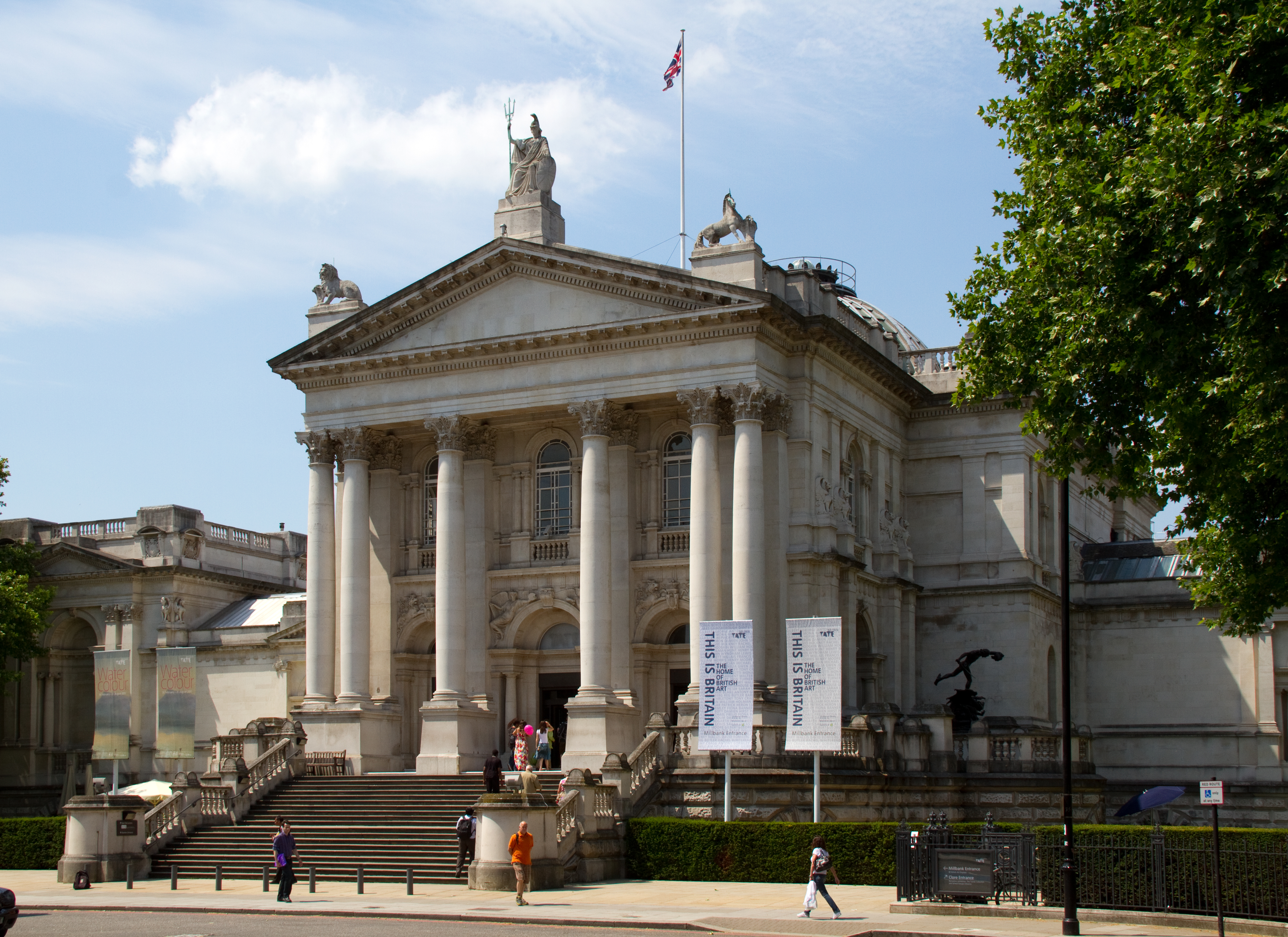
- Tate Britain in 2011
- Established: 1897; 129 years ago
- Location: Millbank; London, SW1
- Coordinates: 51°29′28″N 0°07′39″W
- Visitors: 1,149,325 in 2025
- Director: Alex Farquharson
- Public transit access: Pimlico
- Website: tate.org.uk

Tate
- Tate Britain; Tate Liverpool; Tate Modern; Tate St Ives

Tate Britain, known from 1897 to 1932 as the National Gallery of British Art and from 1932 to 2000 as the Tate Gallery, is an art museum on Millbank in the City of Westminster in London, England. It is part of the Tate network of galleries in England, with Tate Modern, Tate Liverpool and Tate St Ives. Founded by Sir Henry Tate, it houses a substantial collection of the art of the United Kingdom since Tudor times, and in particular has large holdings of the works of J. M. W. Turner, who bequeathed all his own collection to the nation. It is one of the largest museums in the country. In 2021, it ranked 50th on the list of most-visited art museums in the world.

== History ==
The gallery is on Millbank, on the site of the former Millbank Prison. Construction, undertaken by Higgs and Hill, commenced in 1893, and the gallery opened on 21 July 1897 as the National Gallery of British Art. However, from the start it was commonly known as the Tate Gallery, after its founder Sir Henry Tate, and in 1932 it officially adopted that name. Before 2000, the gallery housed and displayed both British and modern collections, but the launch of Tate Modern saw Tate's modern collections move there, while the old Millbank gallery became dedicated to the display of historical and contemporary British art. As a consequence, it was renamed Tate Britain in March 2000.

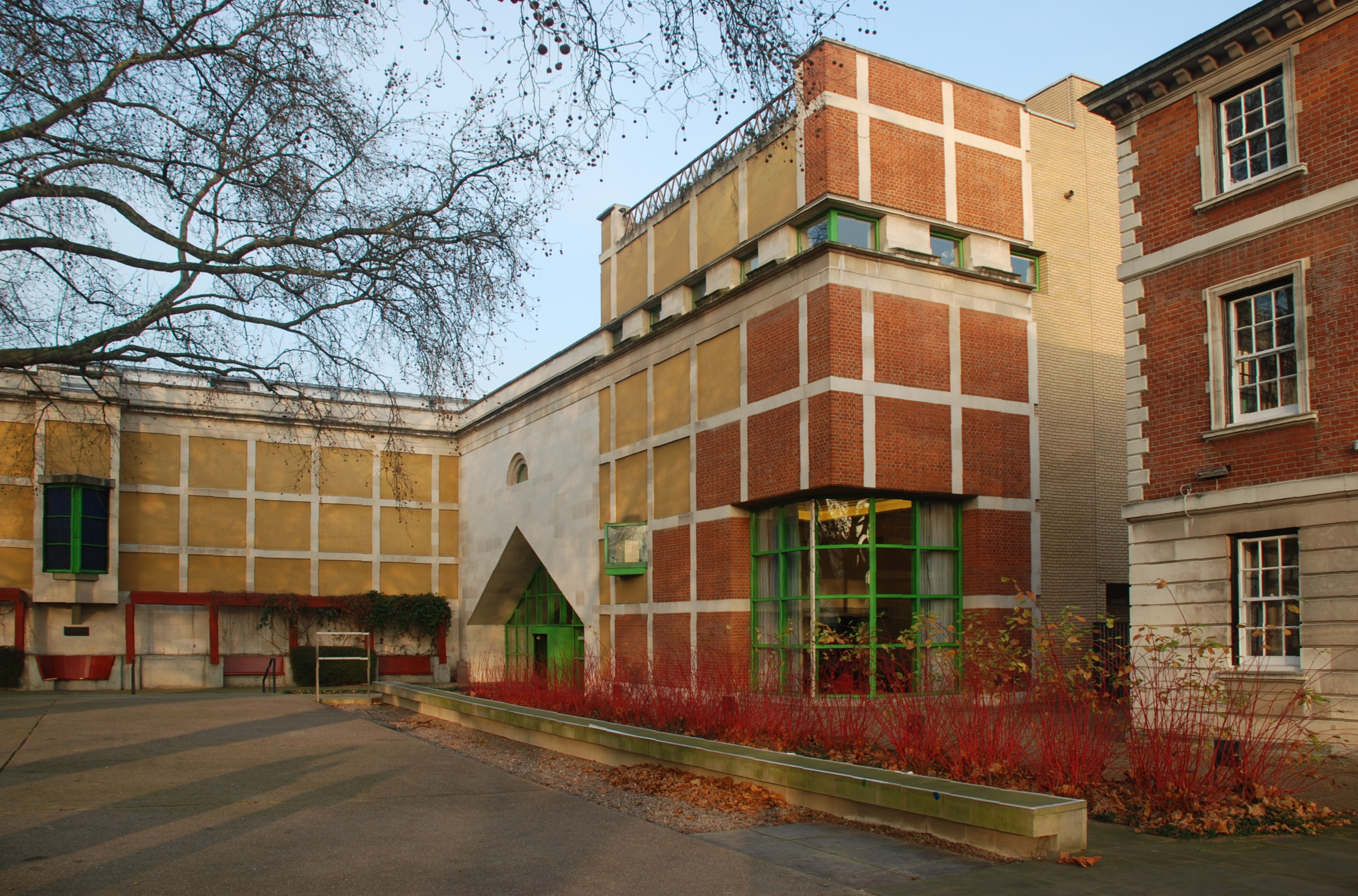
Clore Gallery, designed by James Stirling (1987).

The front part of the building was designed by Sidney R. J. Smith with a classical portico and dome behind, and the central sculpture gallery was designed by John Russell Pope. Tate Britain includes the Clore Gallery of 1987, designed by James Stirling, which houses work by J. M. W. Turner. The Clore Gallery was built through a joint effort between Jewish philanthropist Charles Clore and his daughter, Vivien Duffield, who together donated £6 million, and the British government, which contributed an additional £1.8 million. The Clore Gallery has been regarded as an important example of Postmodern architecture, especially in the use of contextual irony: each section of the external facade quotes liberally from the building next to it in regard to materials and detailing.

Crises during its existence include flood damage to artworks from the River Thames spilling its banks, and bomb damage during World War II. However, most of the collection was in safe storage elsewhere during the war, as in anticipation of the threat to London more than 700 artworks were secretly transported to Muncaster Castle in Cumbria on 24 August 1939. In 1970, the building was given Grade II* listed status.

In 2012, Tate Britain announced that it had raised the £45 million required to complete a major renovation, largely thanks to a £4.9 million grant from the Heritage Lottery Fund and £1 million given by Tate members. The museum stayed open throughout the three phases of renovation. Completed in 2013, the newly designed sections were conceived by the architects Caruso St John and included a total of nine new galleries, with reinforced flooring to accommodate heavy sculptures. A second part was unveiled later that year, the centrepiece being the reopening of the building's Thames-facing entrance as well as a new spiral staircase beneath its rotunda. The circular balcony of the rotunda's domed atrium, closed to visitors since the 1920s, was reopened. The gallery also now has a dedicated schools' entrance and reception beneath its entrance steps on Millbank and a new archive gallery for the presentation of temporary displays.

== Facilities ==
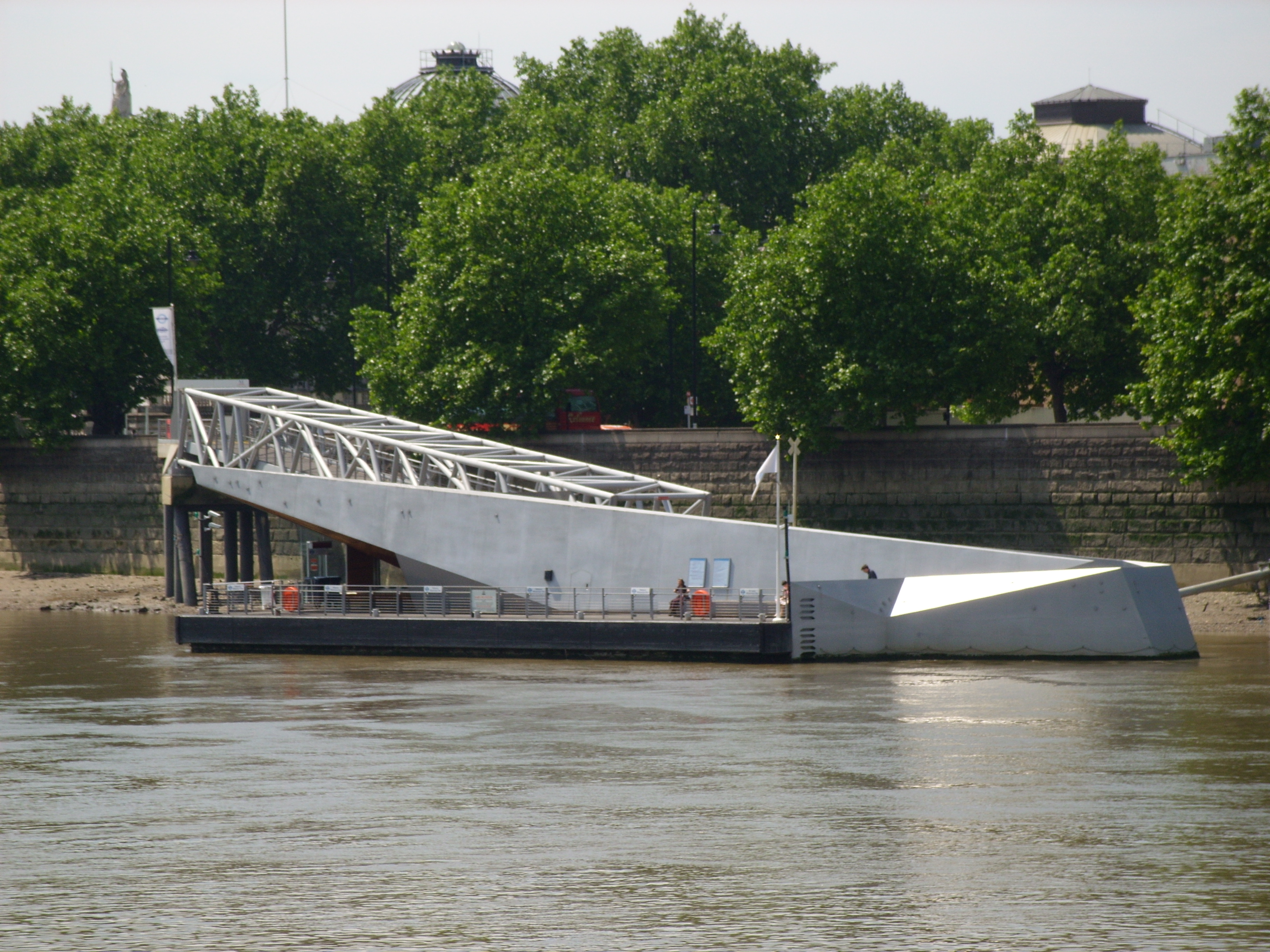
Millbank Millennium Pier outside Tate Britain, which is linked by a river bus to Tate Modern

Tate Britain has a number of accessibility features for disabled visitors. The gallery provides a café and a members room. As well as administration offices, the building complex houses the Prints and Drawings Rooms (in the Clore galleries), as well as the Library and Archive in the Hyman Kreitman Reading Rooms.

Tate Britain and Tate Modern are now connected by a river bus along the River Thames, which runs from Millbank Millennium Pier immediately outside Tate Britain. The boat is decorated with spots, based on paintings of similar appearance by Damien Hirst. The lighting artwork incorporated in the pier's structure is by Angela Bulloch.

=== Rex Whistler restaurant ===
The gallery previously featured the Rex Whistler restaurant, named after Rex Whistler who created a mural, The Expedition in Pursuit of Rare Meats, in the room that was completed in 1927 and that included enslaved Black children and caricatures of Chinese people. This led to complaints, petitioning for removal and an investigation by the Tates's ethics team. The restaurant was closed and the area re-purposed and now features the mural alongside a film installation called Viva Voce by Keith Piper.

== Displays ==
The main display spaces show the permanent collection of historic British art, as well as contemporary work. It has rooms dedicated to works by one artist, such as: Tracey Emin, John Latham, Douglas Gordon, Sam Taylor-Wood, Tacita Dean, and Marcus Gheeraerts the Younger, though these works, like the rest of the collection, are subject to rotation.

The gallery also organises career retrospectives of British artists and temporary major exhibitions of British art. Every three years the gallery stages a Triennial exhibition in which a guest curator provides an overview of contemporary British art. The 2003 Tate Triennial was called Days Like These. Art Now is a small changing show of contemporary artists' work in a dedicated room.

Tate Britain is known for hosting the annual and usually controversial Turner Prize exhibition every other year, that features artists selected by a jury chaired by the director of Tate Britain. Four nominees are announced in spring, the show of their work opens in autumn and the prize itself is given in December. There have been demonstrations against the prize, notably since 2000 an annual picket by Stuckist artists. The exhibition and award ceremony have taken place at locations other than in Tate Britain: for example, in Liverpool (2007), Derry (2013), Glasgow (2015) and Hull (2017).

Late at Tate Britain runs on four evenings each year and is curated by young people. The evenings can include discussions, workshops, films, music, performances and art installations.

Regular free tours operate on the hour, and at 1:15 pm on Tuesday, Wednesday and Thursday short 15-minute talks are given on paintings, artists and artistic styles.

== Permanent collection ==
Tate Britain is the national gallery of British art from 1500 to the present day. As such, it is the most comprehensive collection of its kind in the world. More recent artists include David Hockney, Peter Blake and Francis Bacon. Works in the permanent Tate collection, which may be on display at Tate Britain include:

- Unknown 17th-century artist: The Cholmondeley Ladies
- Francis Bacon: Three Studies for Figures at the Base of a Crucifixion
- William Blake: Newton
- David Bomberg: The Mud Bath
- Hamad Butt: Familiars
- John Constable: Flatford Mill
- Richard Dadd, The Fairy Feller's Master-Stroke
- Herbert James Draper: The Lament for Icarus
- William Dyce: Pegwell Bay, Kent – a Recollection of 5 October 1858
- Augustus Egg: Past and Present
- Thomas Gainsborough: Giovanna Baccelli
- Mark Gertler: Merry-Go-Round
- Joseph Highmore: Pamela is Married
- William Hogarth: The Painter and his Pug
- William Holman Hunt: The Awakening Conscience
- Thomas Lawrence: Homer Reciting his Poems
- John Martin: The Great Day of His Wrath
- Henry Moore: Recumbent Figure 1938
- Sir John Everett Millais: Ophelia
- Paul Nash: ‘’Totes Meer’’
- Sir Joshua Reynolds: Three Ladies Adorning a Term of Hymen
- Dante Gabriel Rossetti: Ecce Ancilla Domini!, Beata Beatrix
- Sir Peter Paul Rubens, Sketch for the Banqueting House Ceiling
- John Singer Sargent, Ellen Terry as Lady Macbeth
- Stanley Spencer: The Resurrection, Cookham
- Clarkson Stanfield : The Canal of the Guidecca, and the Church of the Gesuati, Venice
- George Stubbs: Horse Attacked by a Lion
- Henry Scott Tuke: August Blue
- J. M. W. Turner: The Golden Bough, Norham Castle, Sunrise
- Henry Wallis: The Death of Chatterton
- John William Waterhouse: The Lady of Shalott, The Magic Circle
- James Abbott McNeill Whistler: Symphony in White, No. 2: The Little White Girl, Nocturne: Blue and Gold – Old Battersea Bridge
- Rose Wylie: Pin Up and Porn Queen Jigsaw
- Gillian Wise: Looped Network Suspended in Pictorial Space
- Alison Wilding: Assembly
- Rachel Whiteread: Untitled (Floor/Ceiling)
- Joanna Mary Wells: Gretchen
- Paule Vézelay: Five Forms
- Annie Louisa Swynnerton: Oreads
- Helen Saunders: Monochrome Abstract Composition
- Eva Rothschild: The Fallowfield
- Bridget Riley: Achæan
- Paula Rego: War
- Fiona Rae: Maybe you can live on the moon in the next century
- Grace Pailthorpe: 4 December 1938
- Mabel Nicholson: Family Group
- Jessica Dismorr: Abstract Composition
- Lucy McKenzie: Side Entrance
- Mary Martin (artist): Inversions
- Hilary Lloyd: One Minute of Water
- Kim Lim: Shogun
- Liliane Lijn: Headborn
- Claudette Johnson: Standing Figure with African Masks
- Gwen John: Nude Girl
- Frances Hodgkins: Flatford Mill
- Susan Hiller: Belshazzar's Feast, the Writing on Your Wall
- Amelia Robertson Hill: Percy Bysshe Shelley
- Barbara Hepworth: Spring, 1957 (Project for Sculpture)
- Dora Gordine: Javanese Head
- Works from the Panchayat Arts and Education Resource Unit or 'Panchayat Collection'

== Gallery ==
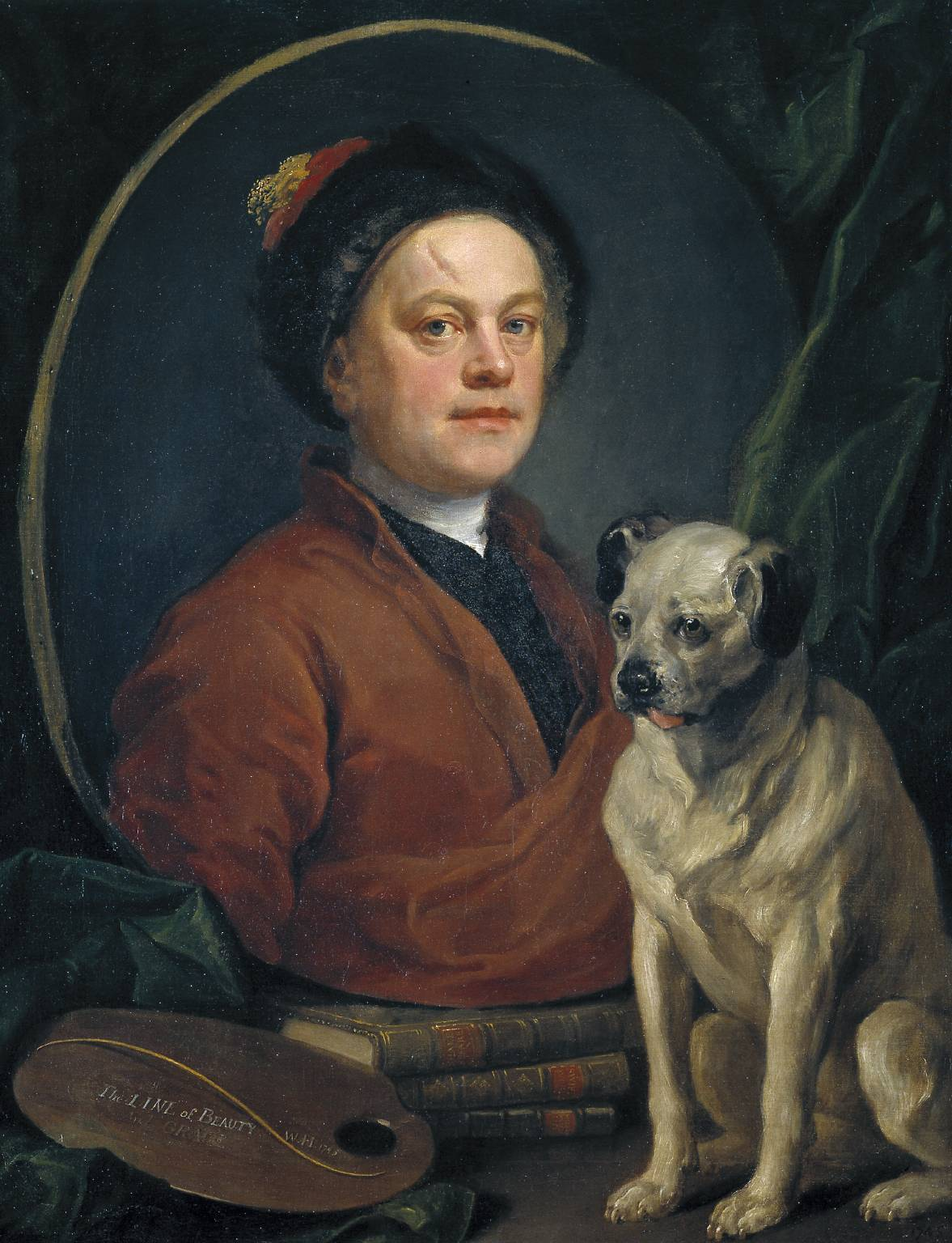
William Hogarth, The Painter and his Pug, 1745

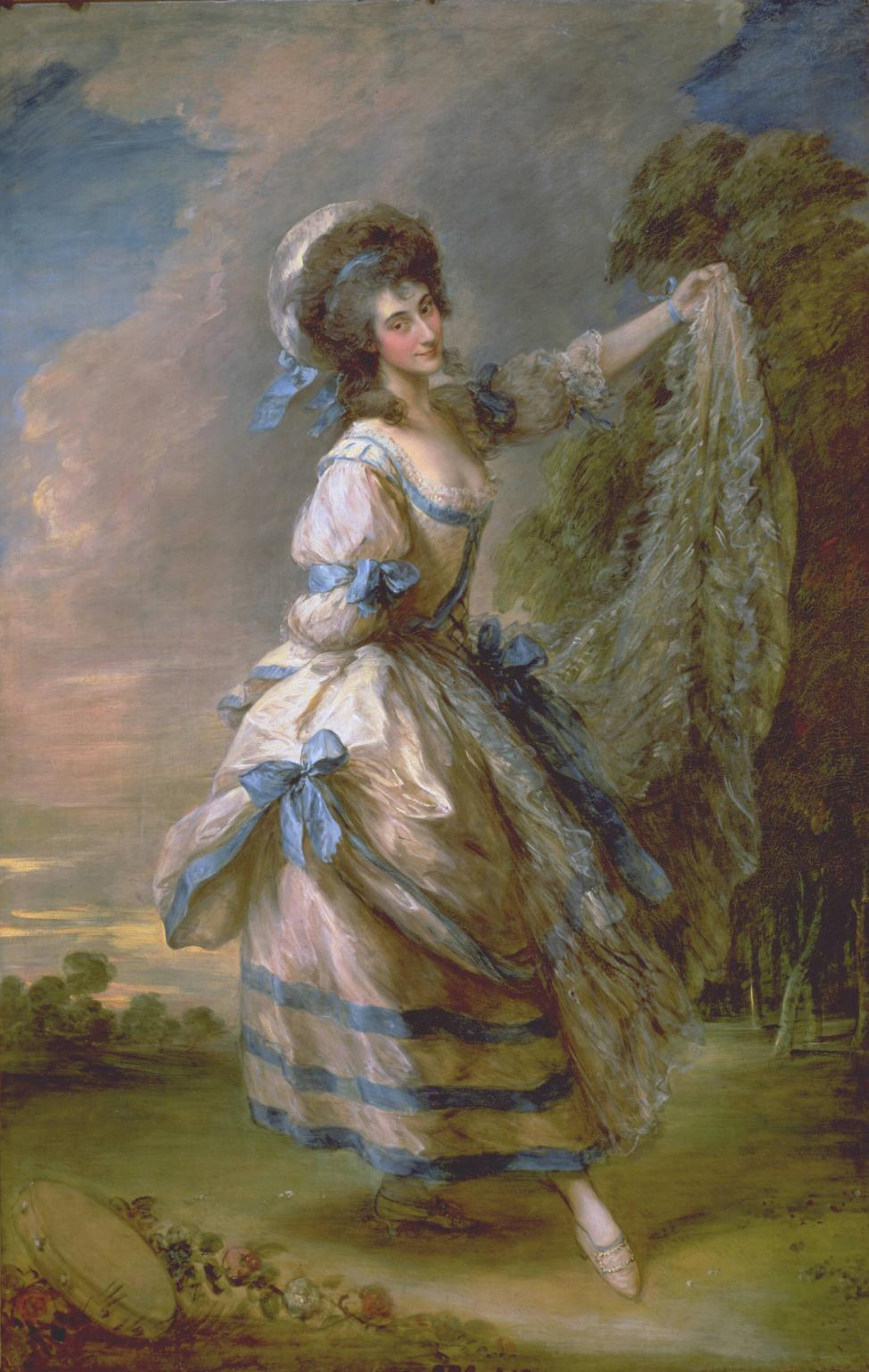
Thomas Gainsborough, Portrait of Giovanna Baccelli, 1782

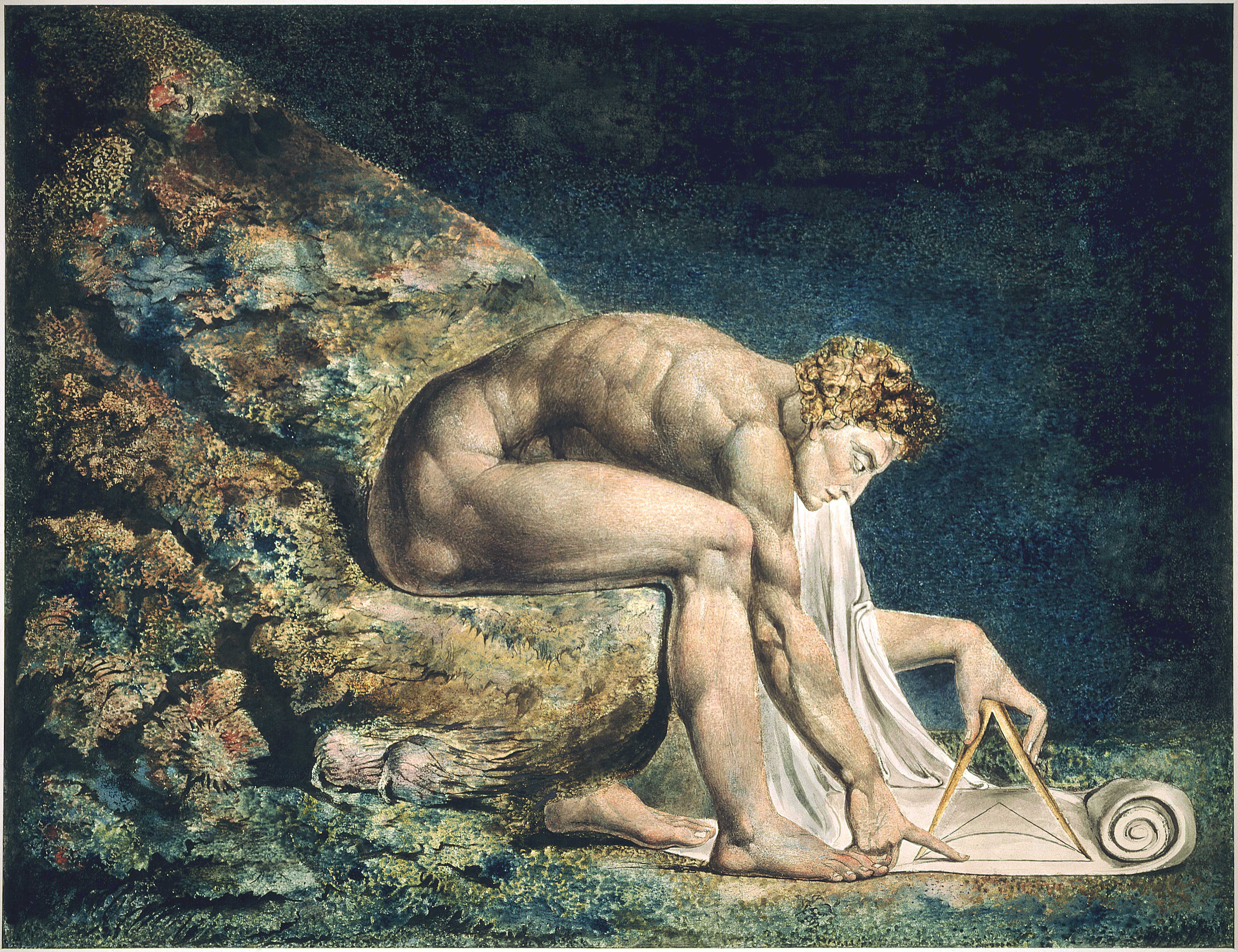
William Blake, Newton, 1785

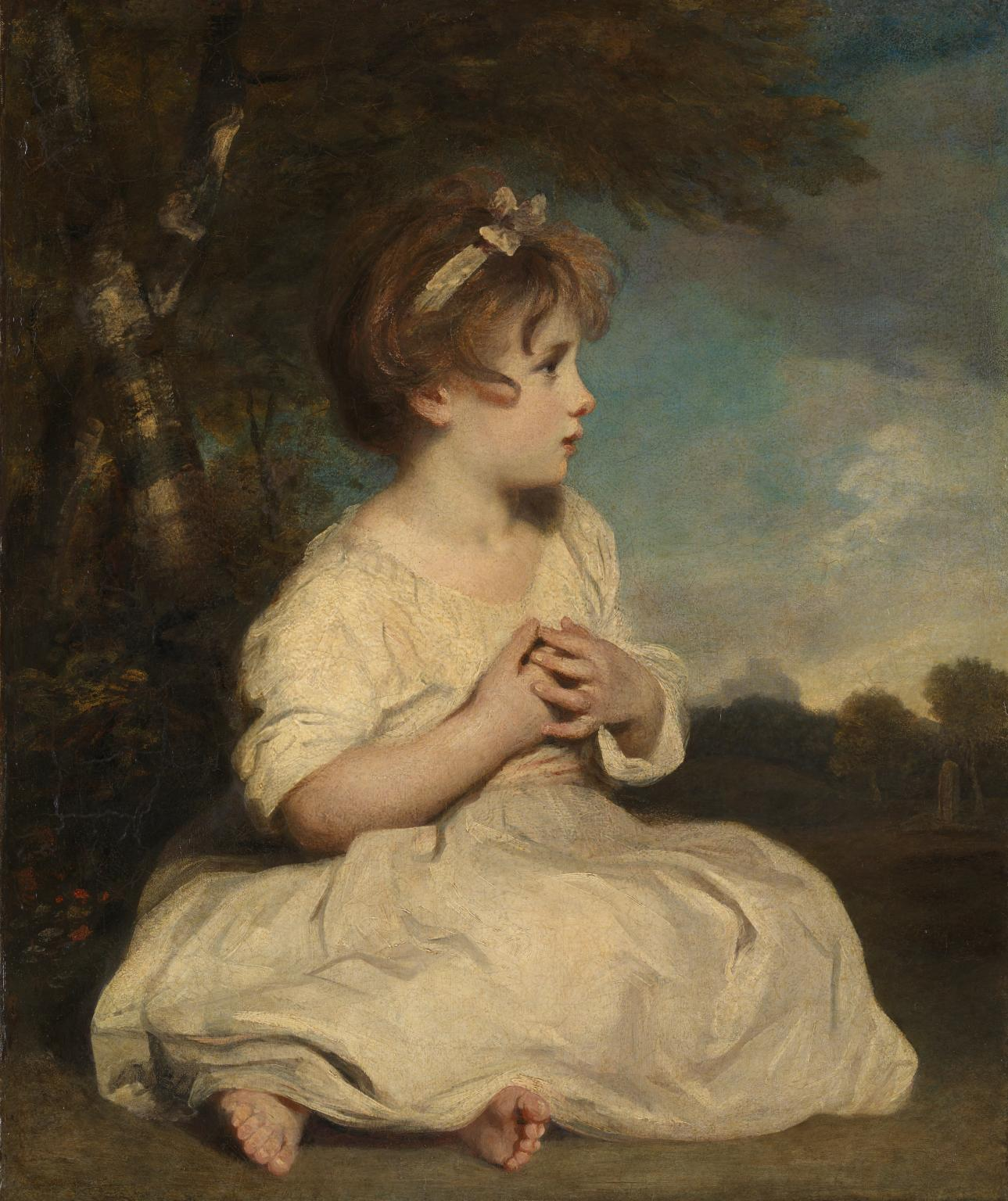
Joshua Reynolds, The Age of Innocence, 1788

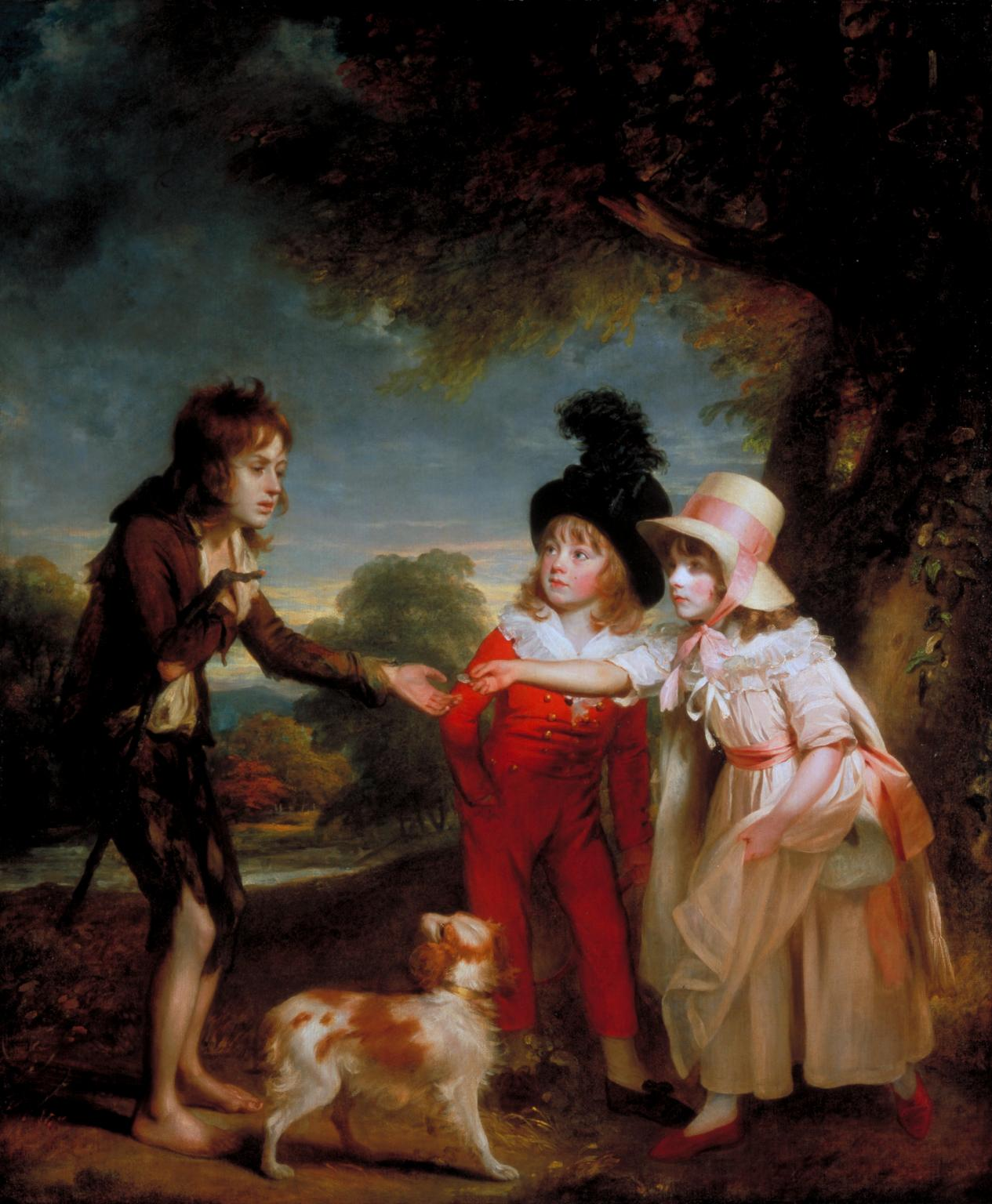
William Beechey, Sir Francis Ford's Children Giving a Coin to a Beggar Boy, 1793

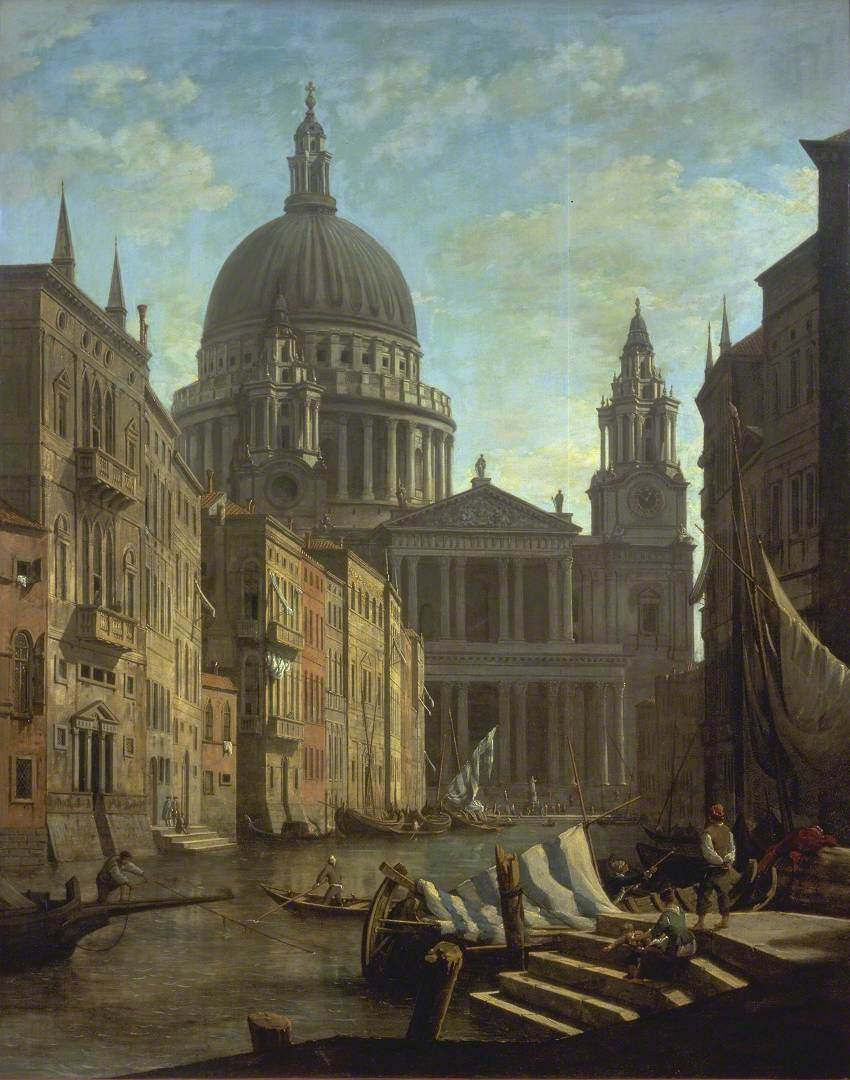
William Marlow, Capriccio: St Paul's and a Venetian Canal, 1795

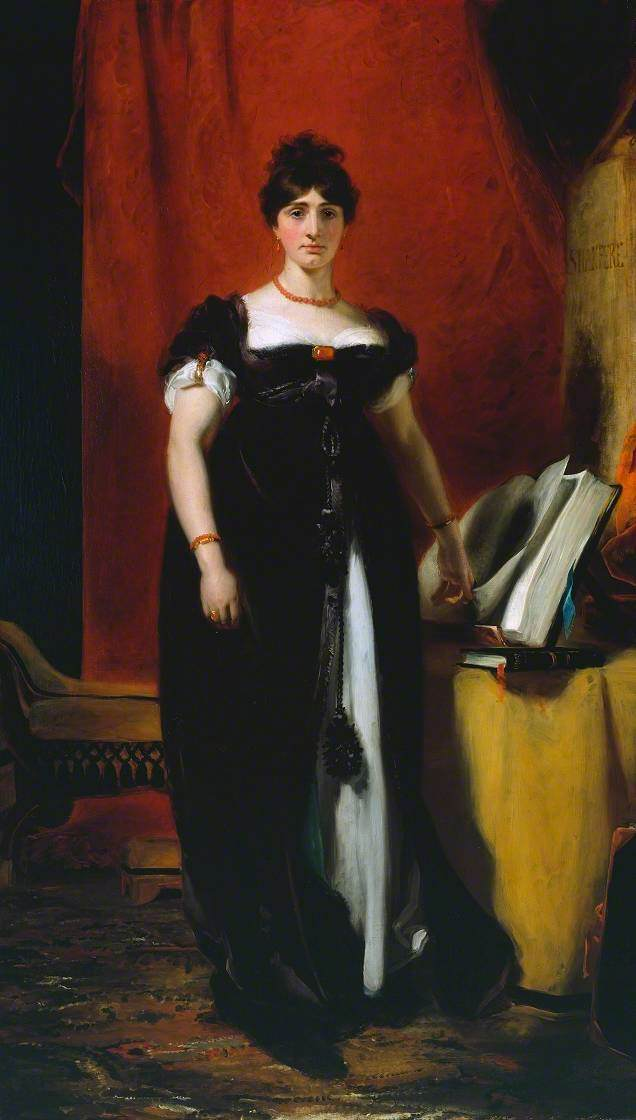
Thomas Lawrence, Portrait of Sarah Siddons, 1804

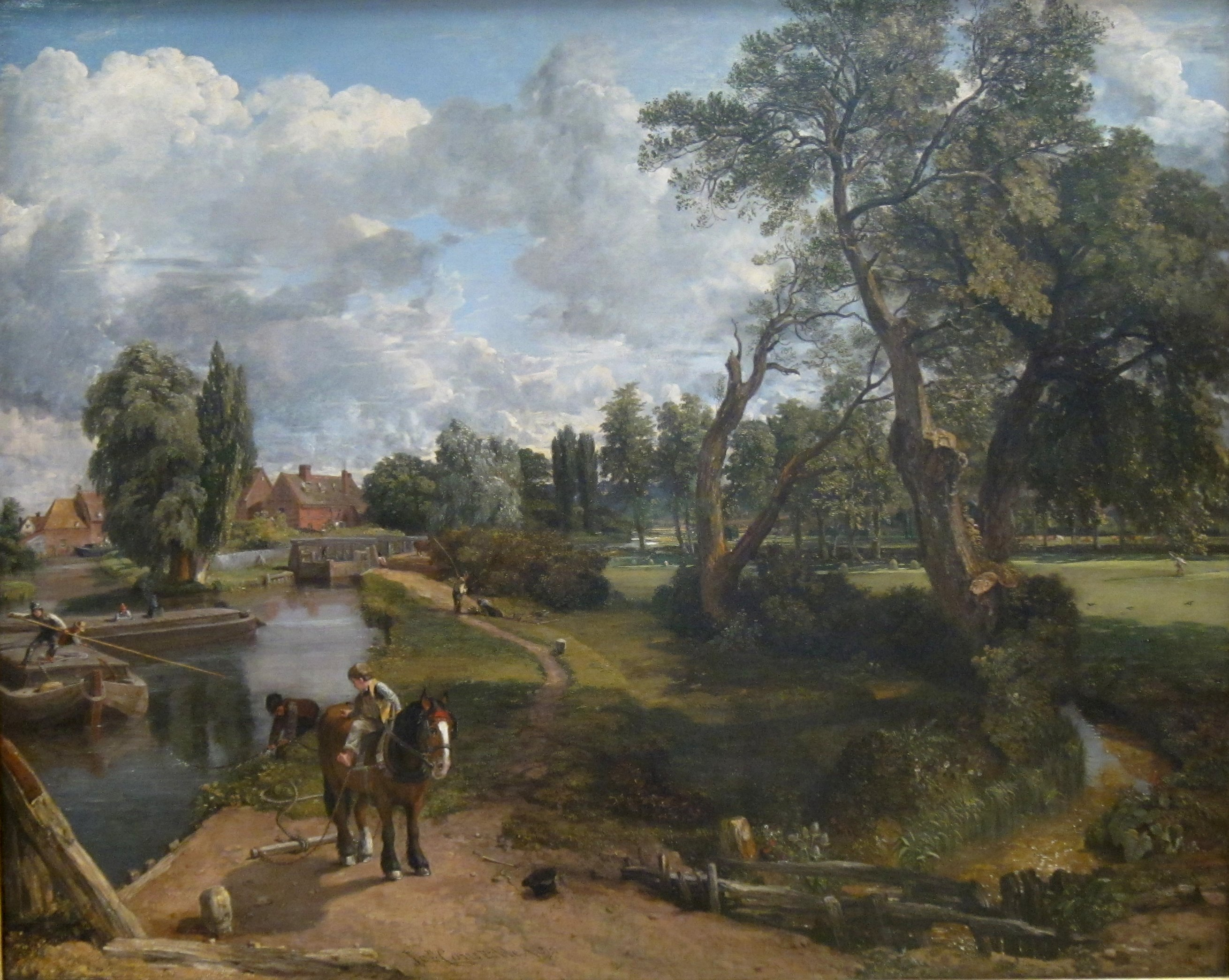
John Constable, Flatford Mill (Scene on a Navigable River), 1816

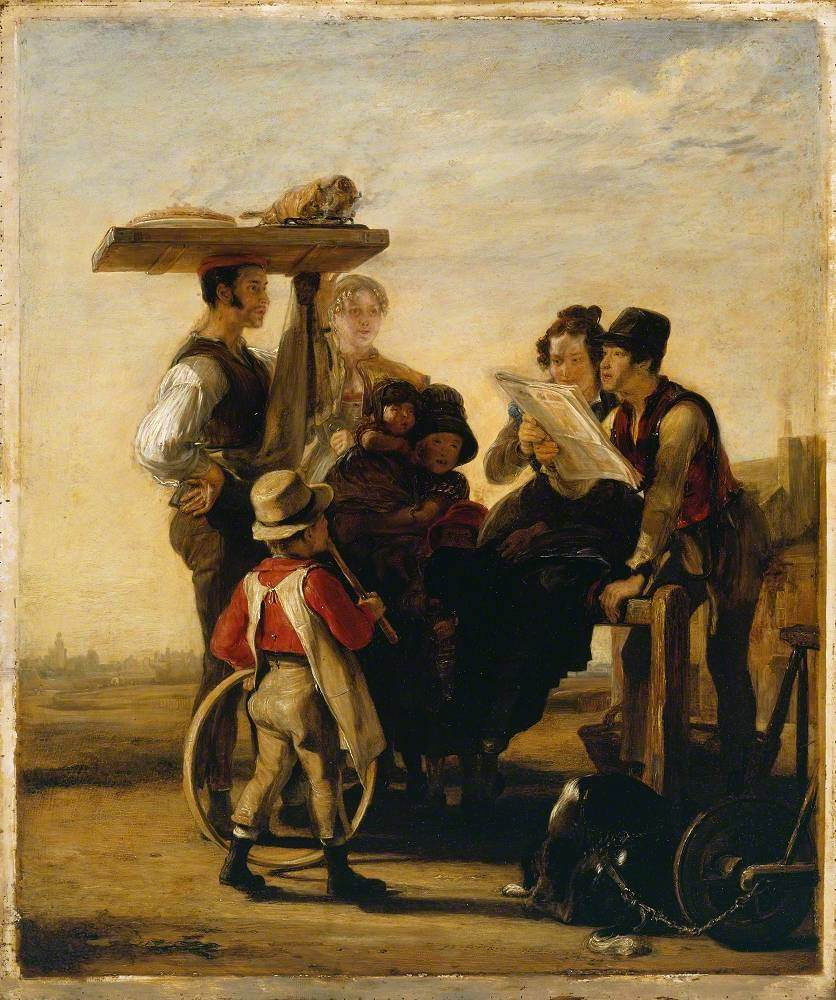
David Wilkie, Newsmongers, 1821

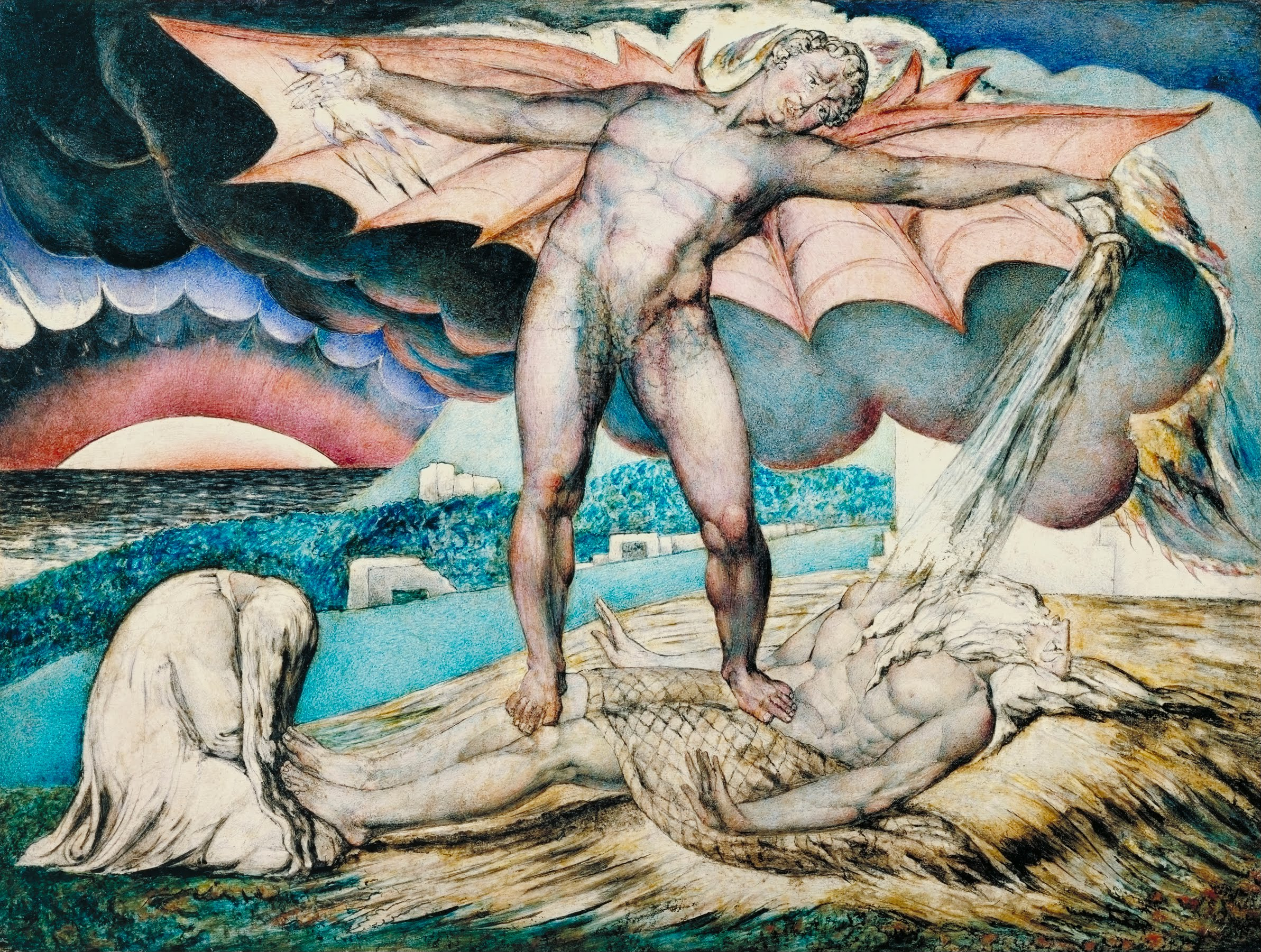
William Blake, Satan Smiting Job with Sore Boils, c. 1826

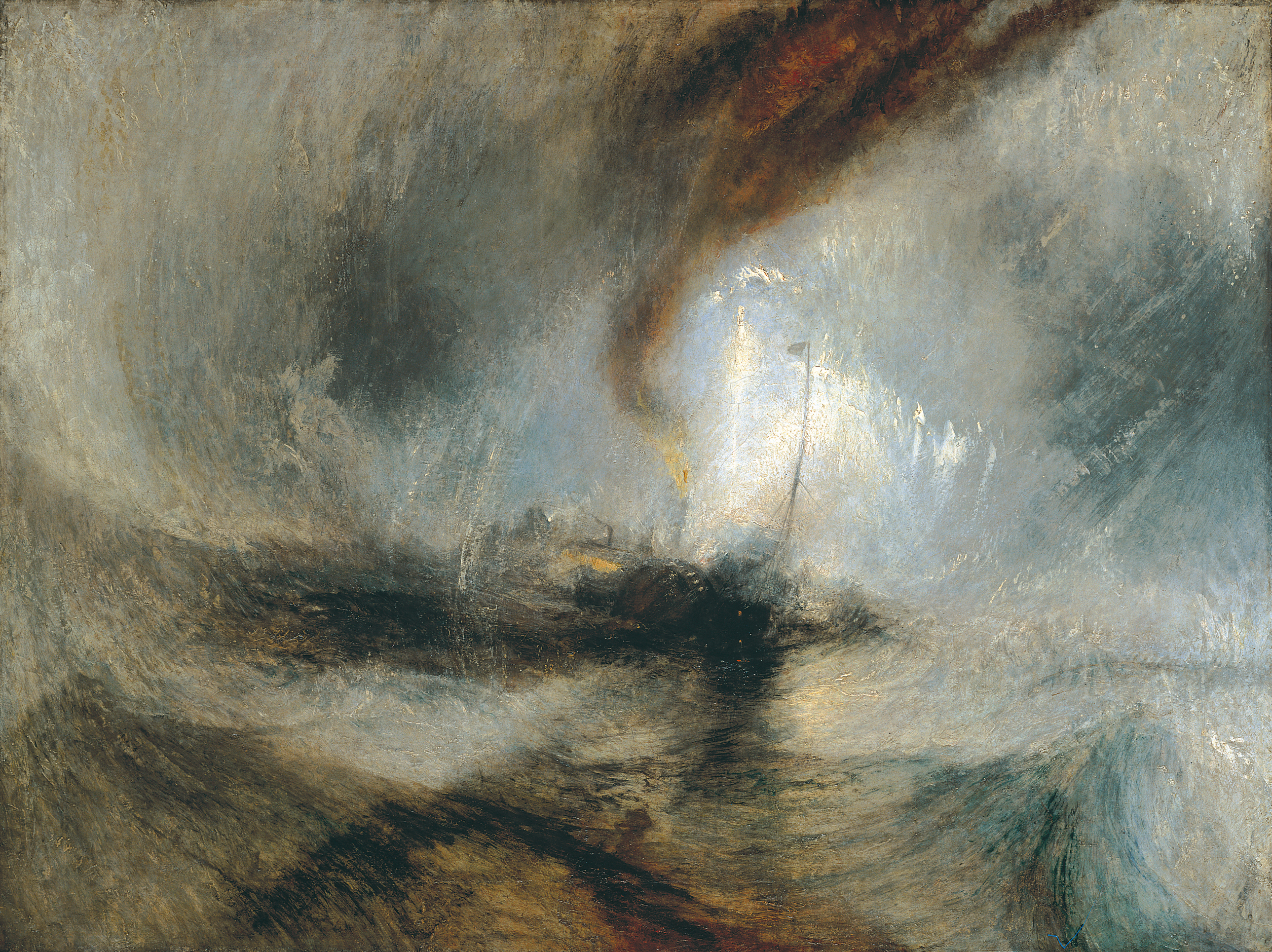
J. M. W. Turner, Snow Storm: Steam-Boat off a Harbour's Mouth, 1842

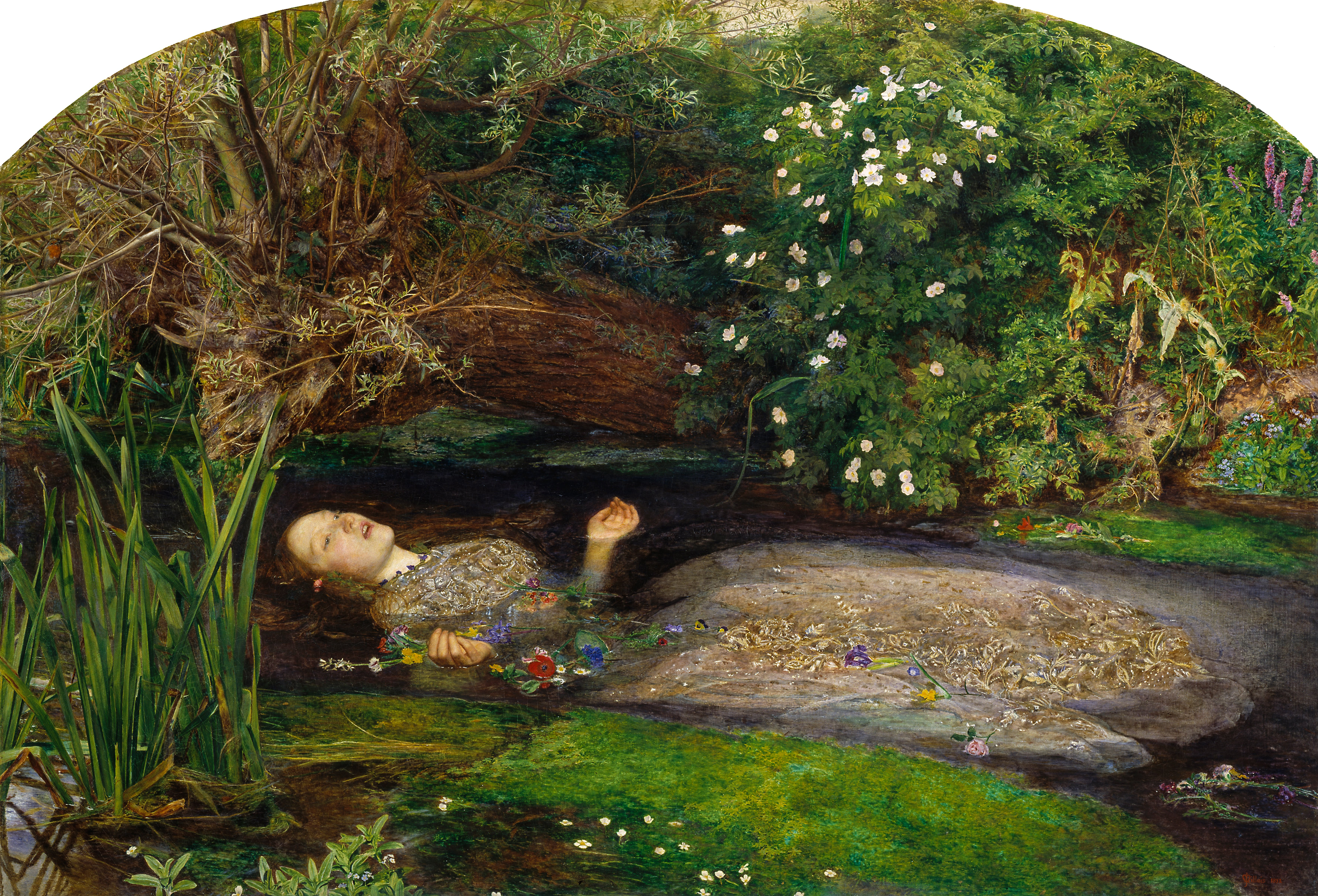
Sir John Everett Millais, Ophelia, 1851–52

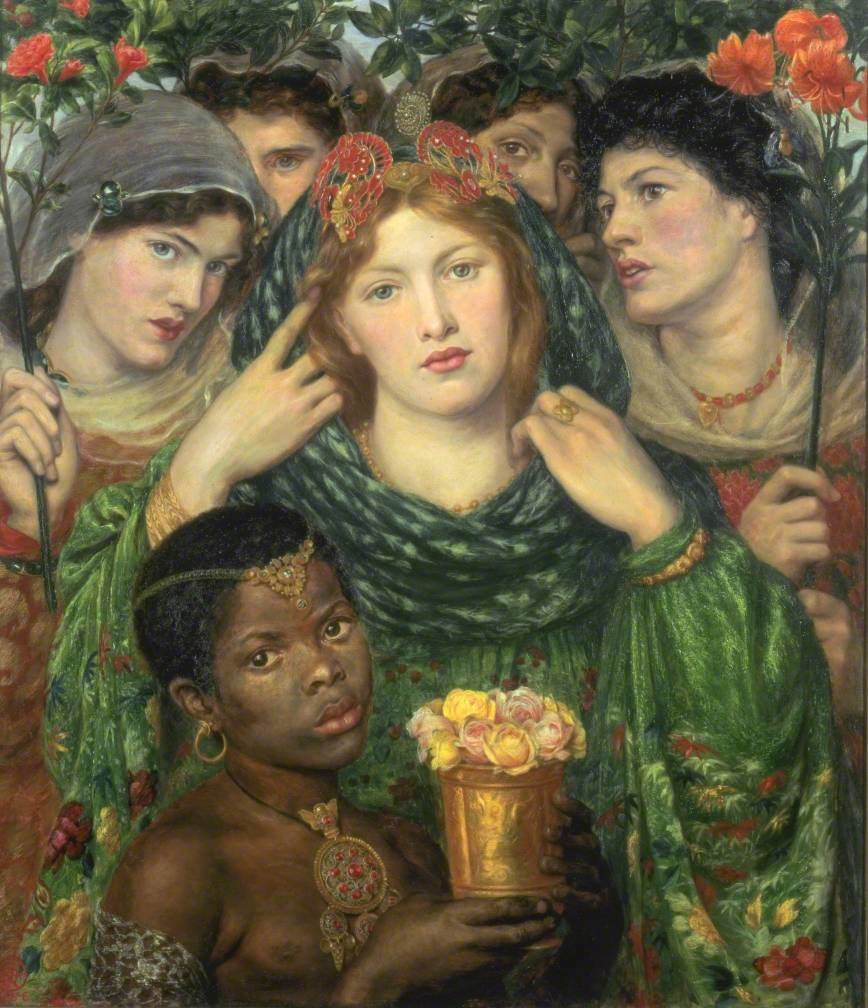
Dante Gabriel Rossetti, The Beloved, 1865–66

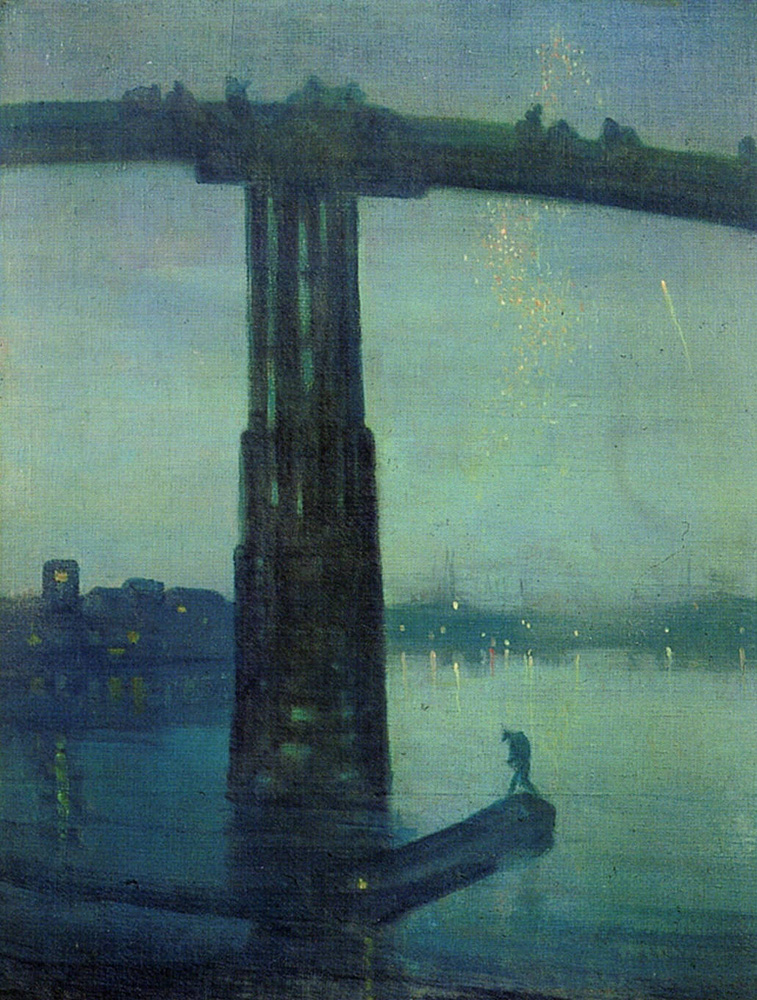
James Abbott McNeill Whistler, Nocturne: Blue and Gold – Old Battersea Bridge, c. 1872–1875

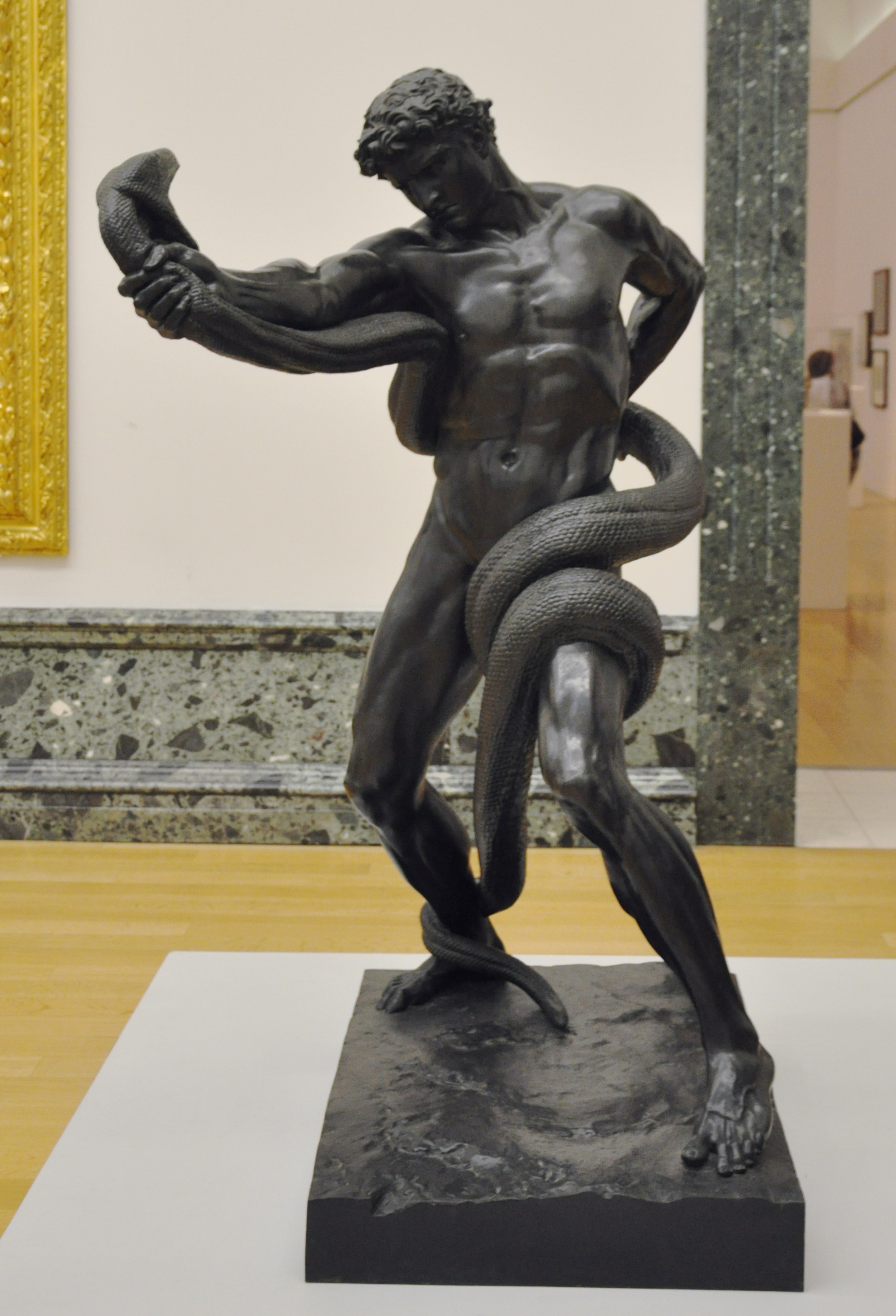
Frederic Leighton, An Athlete Wrestling with a Python, 1877

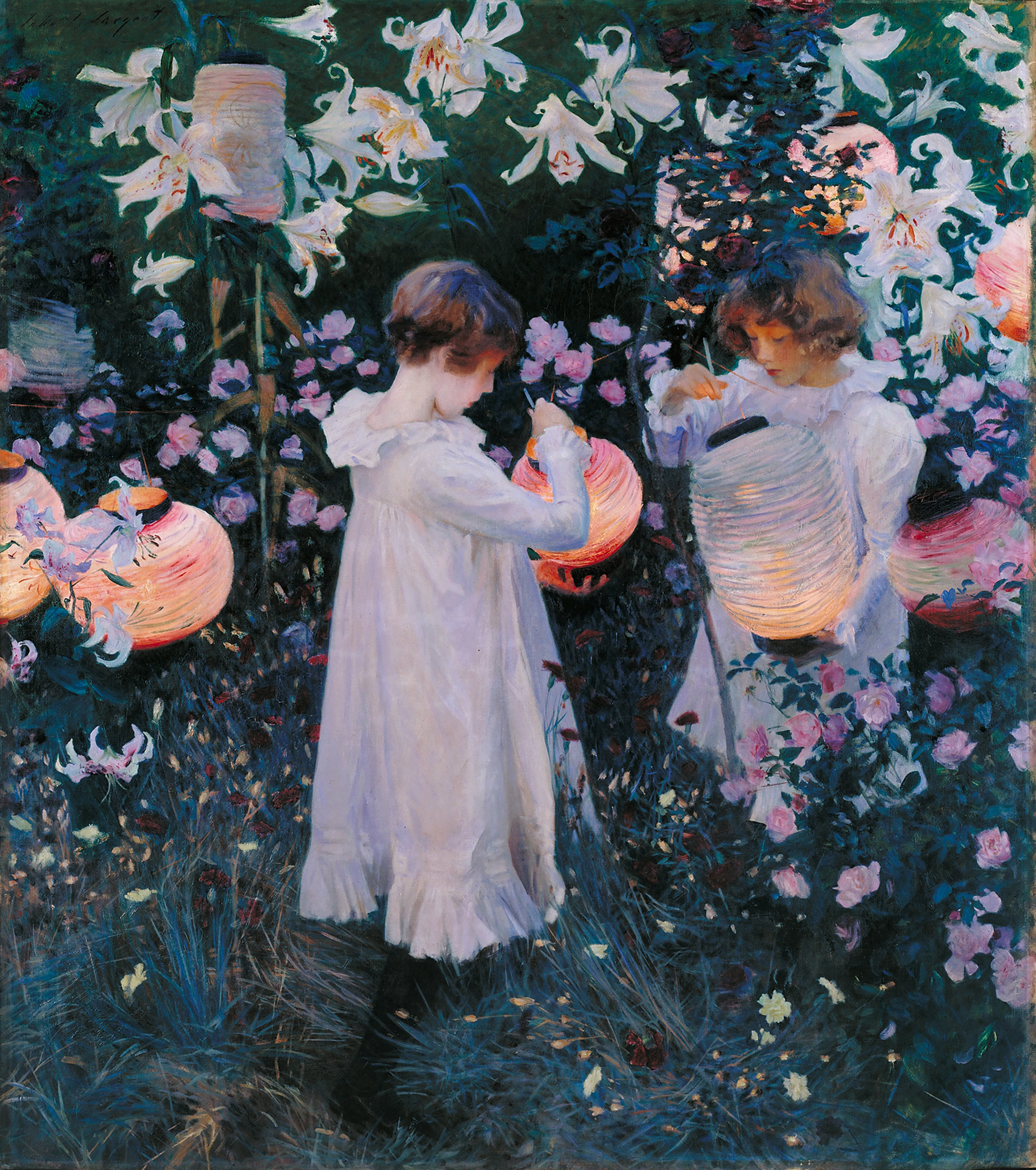
John Singer Sargent, Carnation, Lily, Lily, Rose, 1885

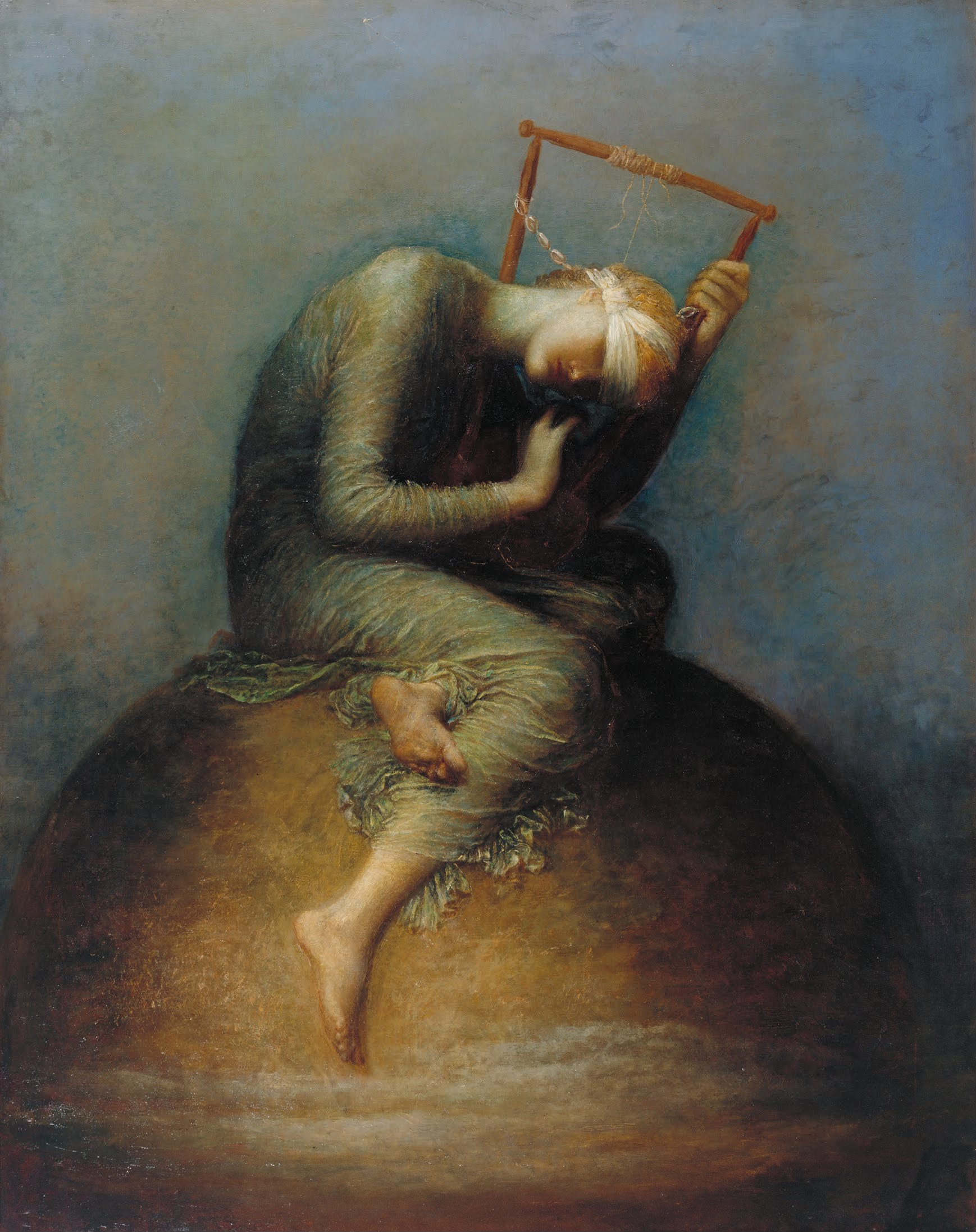
George Frederic Watts, Hope, 1886

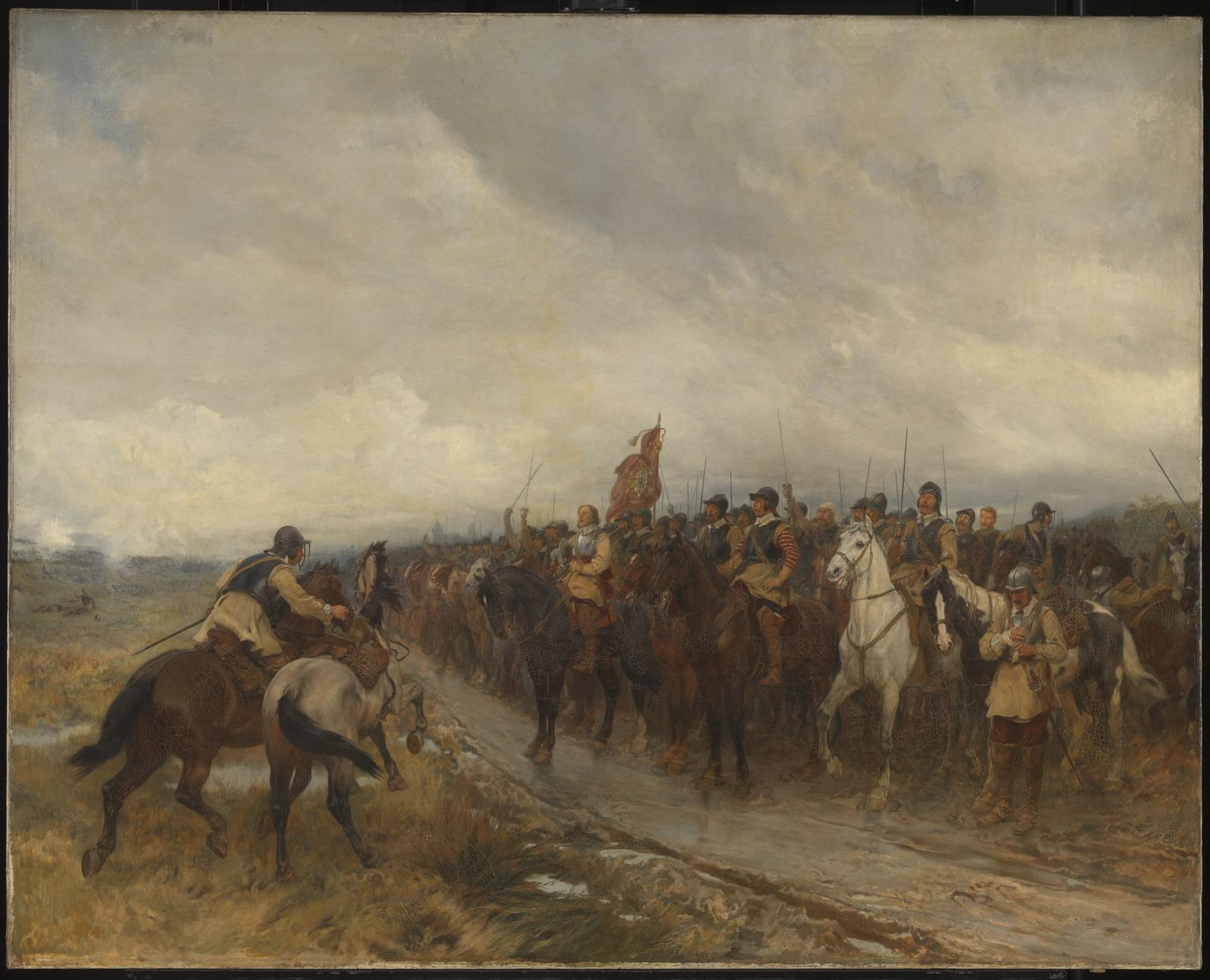
Andrew Carrick Gow, Cromwell at Dunbar, 1886

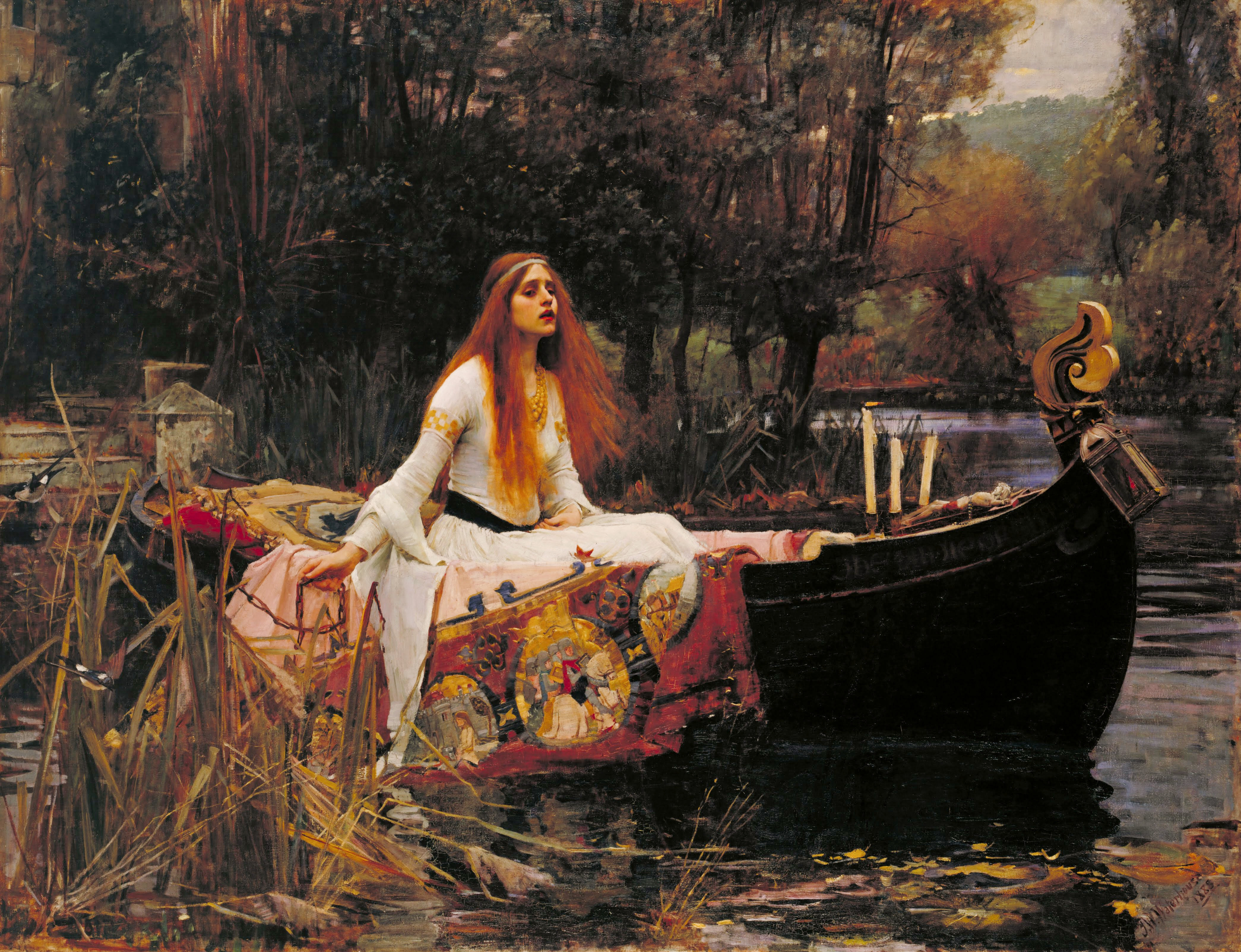
John William Waterhouse, The Lady of Shalott, 1888

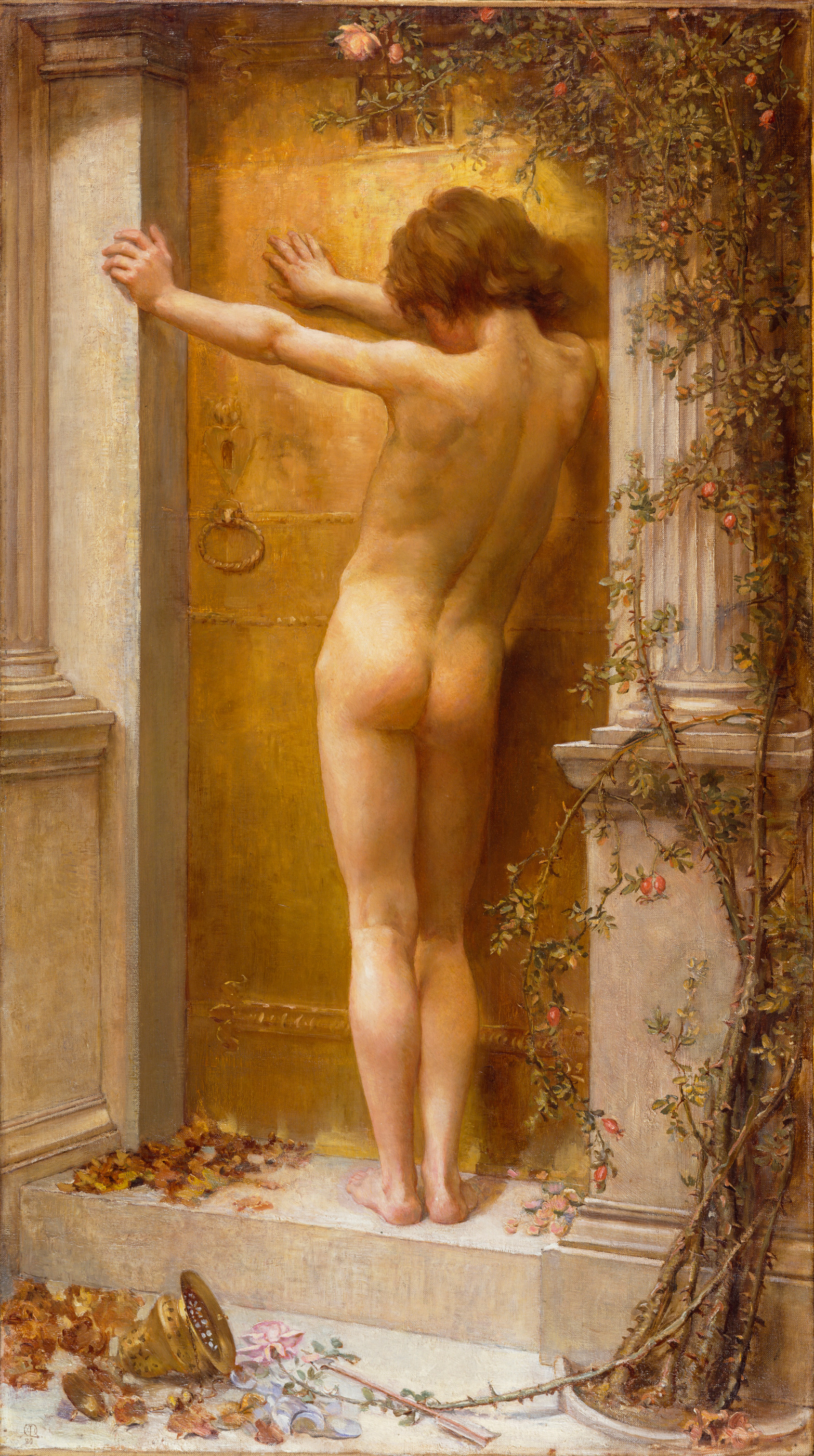
Anna Lea Merritt, Love Locked Out, 1890

David Bomberg, The Mud Bath, 1914

== Statue of John Everett Millais ==
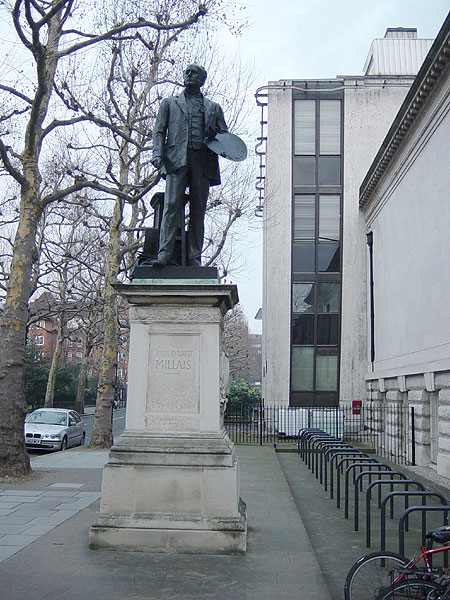
Statue of John Everett Millais by Thomas Brock at Tate Britain, installed 1905

When the Pre-Raphaelite painter and President of the Royal Academy, John Everett Millais, died in 1896, the Prince of Wales (later to become King Edward VII) chaired a memorial committee, which commissioned a statue of the artist. The sculpture, by Thomas Brock, was installed at the front of the gallery in the garden on the east side in 1905. On 23 November that year, The Pall Mall Gazette called it "a breezy statue, representing the man in the characteristic attitude in which we all knew him".

In 1953, Tate Director, Sir Norman Reid, attempted to have it replaced by Rodin's John the Baptist, and in 1962 again proposed its removal, calling its presence "positively harmful". His efforts were frustrated by the statue's owner, the Ministry of Works. Ownership was transferred from the Ministry to English Heritage in 1996, and by them in turn to the Tate. In 2000 the statue was removed to the rear of the building.

== Controversy ==
=== BP Sponsorship ===
Starting in 1990, oil company BP began a sponsorship of Tate Britain, which was to become 'the longest and most consistent sponsorship of any permanent art collection in the UK' according to the Tate itself. Although BP renewed its support in 2011, offering a fresh commitment to last a further decade, the following year BP announced the termination of its support for Tate Britain, blaming the 'extremely challenging business environment'. Although the company denied that the decision was influenced by climate change protests, BP's support for Tate Britain had drawn the attention of activists to the gallery. In 2015, a collective called Liberate Tate had occupied part of Tate Britain and attributed BP's move to climate activism, which has since become a focus of academic study.

== Transport connections ==
Service	Station/Stop	Lines/Routes served	Distance from Tate Britain
London Buses	Tate Britain	87	
London Underground	Pimlico	Victoria line	0.4-mile walk
National Rail	Vauxhall	South Western Railway	0.5-mile walk
London River Services	Millbank Millennium Pier	Tate to Tate	0.2-mile walk

== See also ==
- List of national galleries
- List of largest art museums
