= Anna Lea Merritt =

American painter (1844–1930)

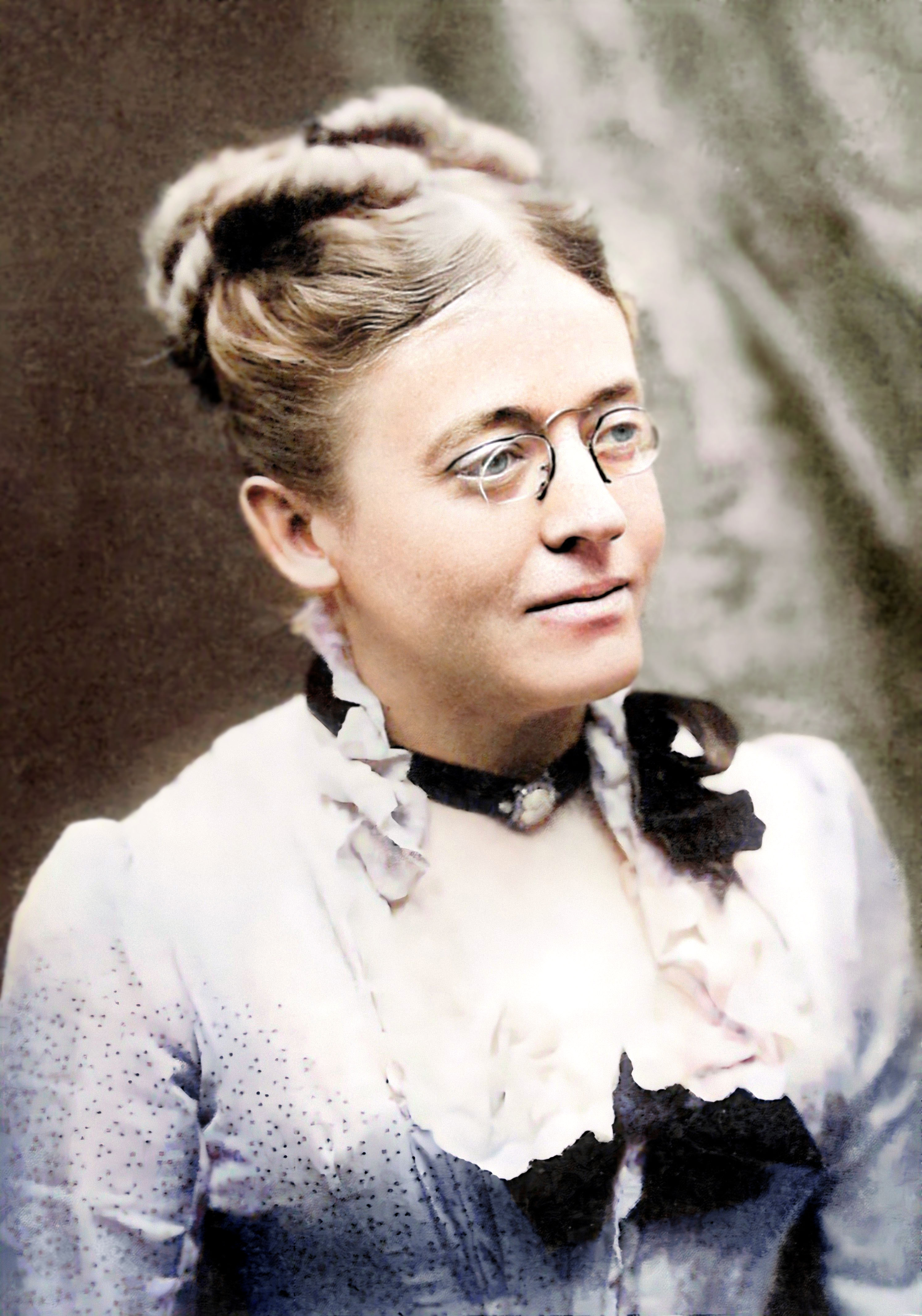
- Born: Anna Massey Lea; September 13, 1844; Philadelphia, Pennsylvania
- Died: April 7, 1930 (aged 85); Hurstbourne Tarrant, Hampshire, England
- Known for: Painting
- Notable work: Love Locked Out
- Spouse: Henry Merritt

Signature
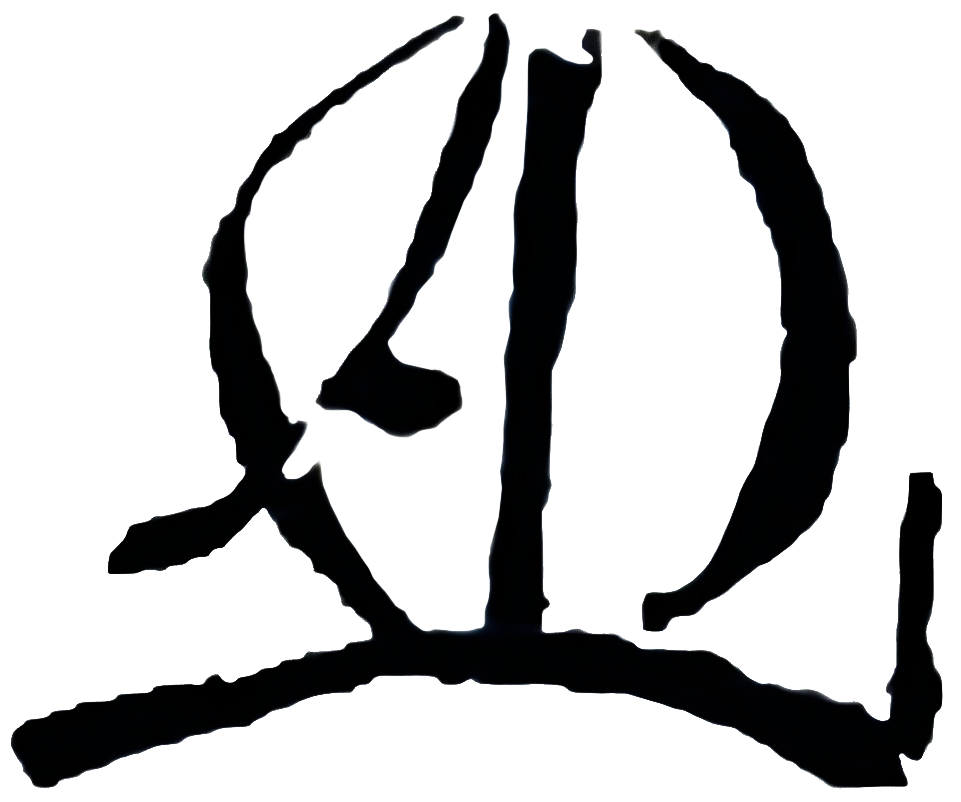

Anna Massey Lea Merritt (September 13, 1844 – April 7, 1930) was an American artist from Philadelphia who lived and worked in Great Britain for most of her life. A printmaker and painter of portraits, landscapes, and religious scenes, Merritt's art was influenced by the Pre-Raphaelites. Merritt was a professional artist for most of her adult life, "living by her brush" before her brief marriage to Henry Merritt and after his death.

== Life ==
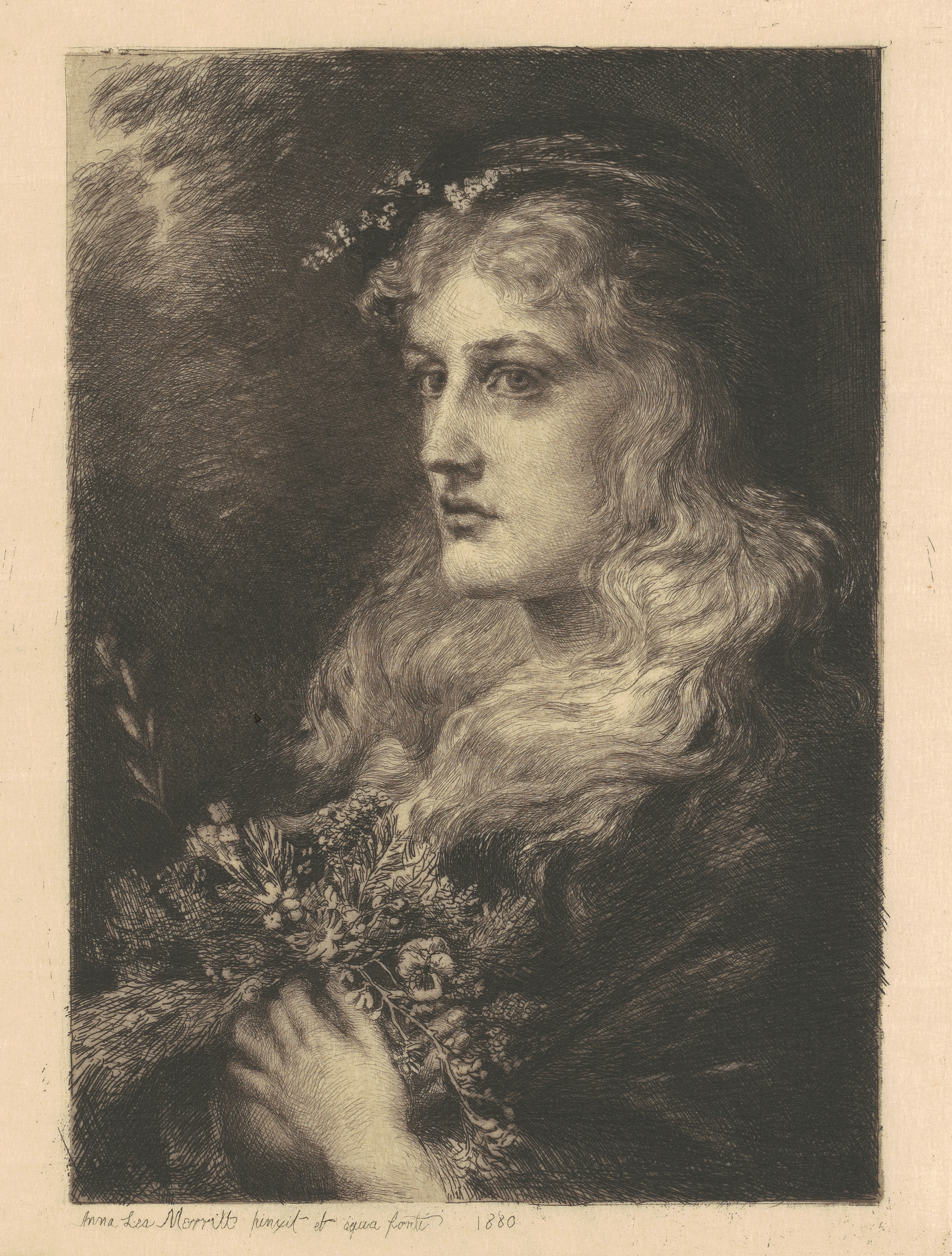
Ophelia, 1880, National Gallery of Art

Anna Massey Lea was born in 1844 in Philadelphia, Pennsylvania, the daughter of an affluent Quaker couple, Joseph Lea and Susanna Massey, and the eldest of six sisters. She studied anatomy at the Woman's Medical College of Pennsylvania. In 1865, the family moved to Europe, where she took art lessons from Stefano Ussi, Heinrich Hoffman, Léon Cogniet and Alphonse Legros. They moved to London in 1870 to escape the Franco-Prussian War, and in 1871 she met Henry Merritt (1822–1877), a noted art critic and picture conservator, who would become her tutor and later, her husband. They married April 17, 1877, but he died July 10 the same year. She had no children and did not marry again.

Merritt spent the rest of her life in England, settling at 95 Cheyne Walk, Chelsea, (next door to where James McNeill Whistler once lived, and where he painted his Whistler's Mother). Merrit made frequent trips between her home in England and the United States; she had exhibitions, garnered awards in both countries, and become a celebrated artist. She exhibited her work at the Palace of Fine Arts and The Woman's Building at the 1893 World's Columbian Exposition in Chicago, Illinois.

After her husband died Anna contributed 23 etchings to illustrate a book of his art criticism.

In 1894–95 she painted scenes on the walls of St Martin's Church, Blackheath village, where she painted on dry plaster using silicone-based paints, which was a new technique intended to counter the effects of dampness. The paintings are scenes from the life of Christ.

Anna was both an artist and a writer. When she wrote for The Century Magazine and Lippincott's Magazine she used the pseudonym "An exile".

She died in England on April 5, 1930, in Hurstbourne Tarrant, Hampshire.

== Love Locked Out ==
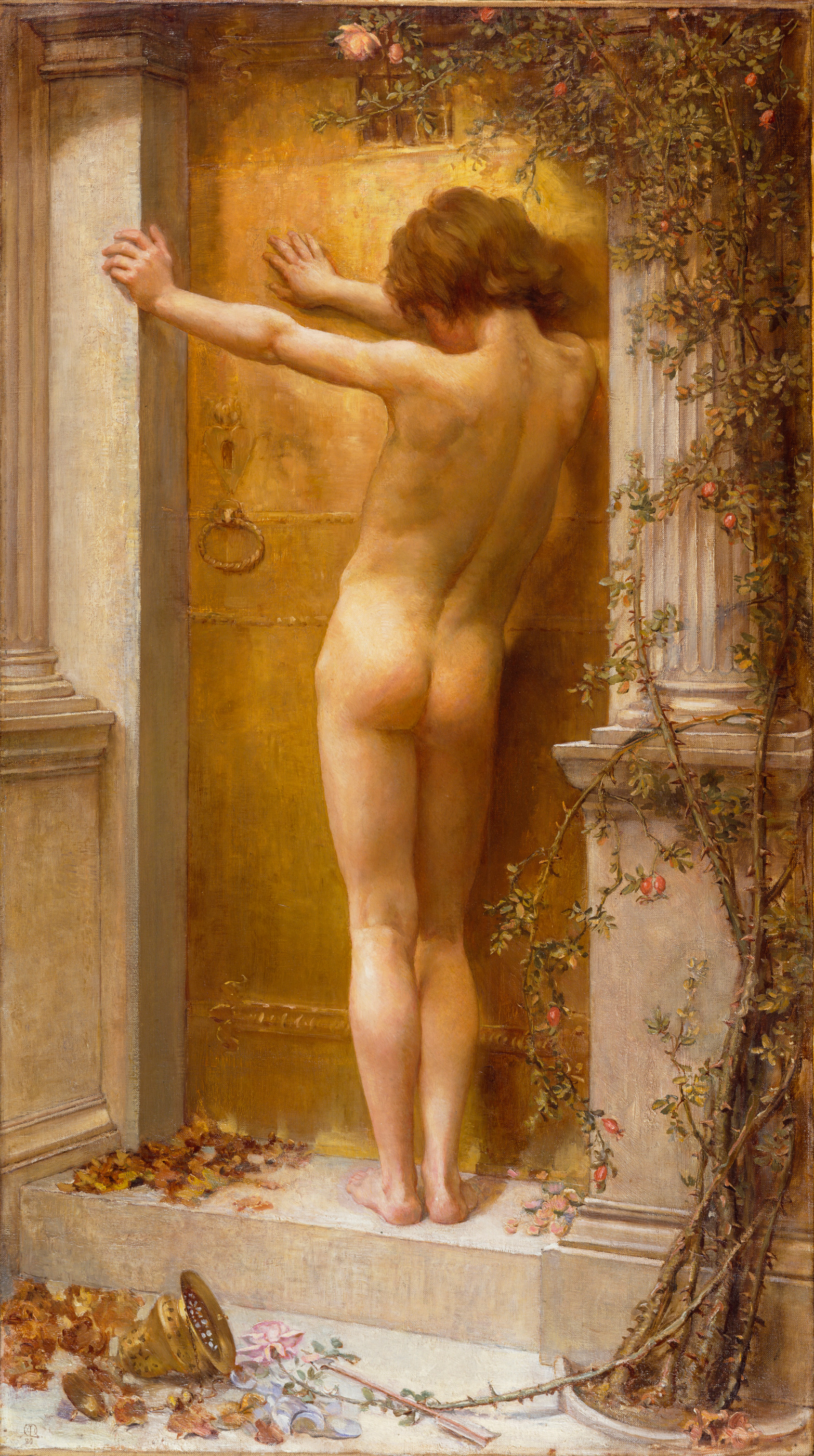
Love Locked Out (1890), Merritt's best known painting

Merritt painted her best-known work, Love Locked Out, in 1890, in memory of her husband who had died in 1877 just three months after their wedding. She had hoped to have the image, a portrayal of Cupid standing before a locked door, done in bronze as a monument, but could not afford it. Merritt initially resisted allowing the painting to be copied despite innumerable requests, because she feared the subject would be misinterpreted: "I feared people liked it as a symbol of forbidden love," she wrote in her memoir, "while my Love was waiting for the door of death to open and the reunion of the lonely pair".

Though Merritt was already a recognized working artist, she had intended to end her professional career after her wedding, but she returned to painting after her husband's death. Although she was American, Love Locked Out was exhibited at the Royal Academy in 1890 and became the first painting by a woman artist acquired for the British national collection through the Chantrey Bequest.

== Thoughts on women in the arts ==
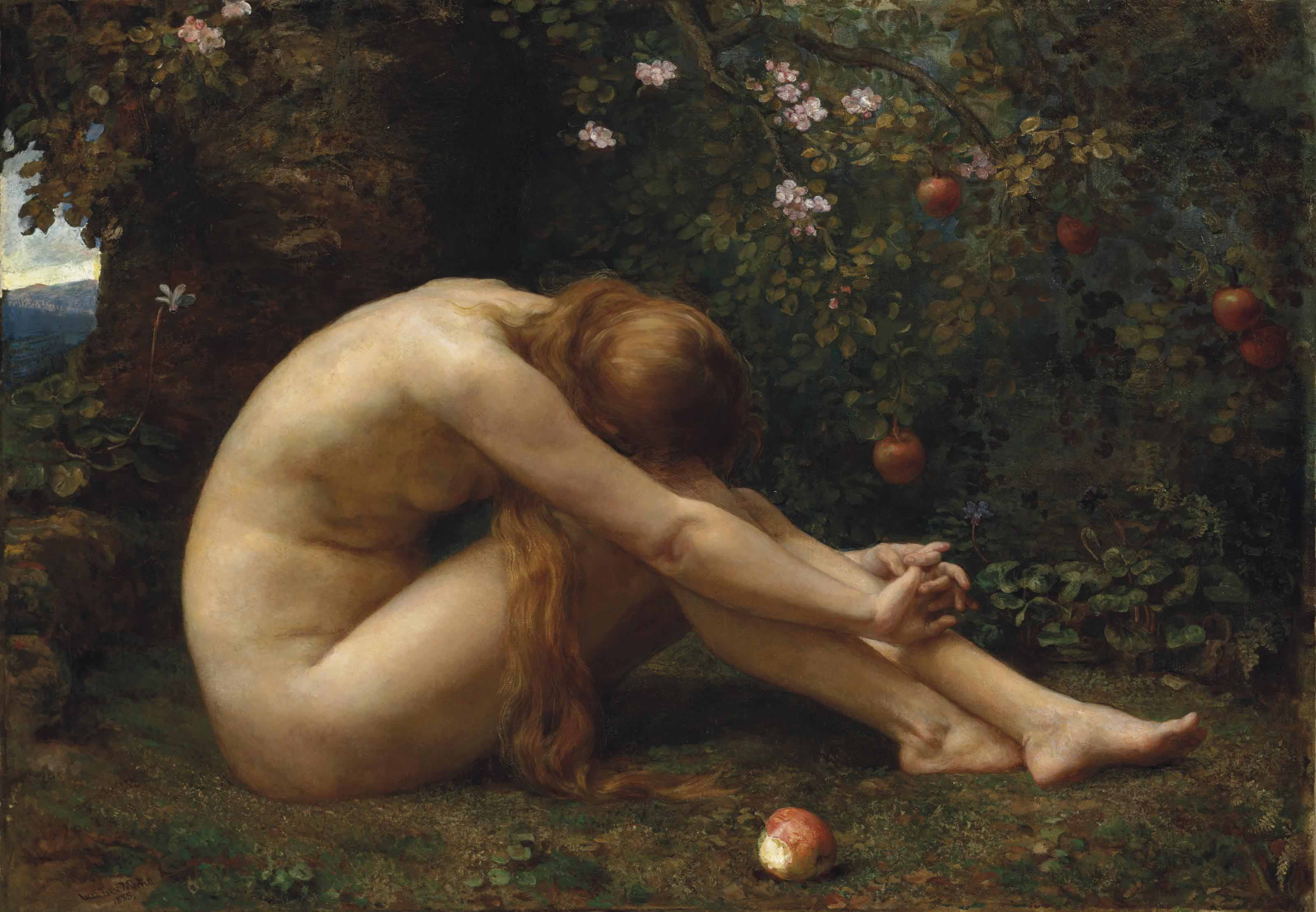
Eve Overcome with Remorse, 1885

In 1900, Merritt wrote that she felt she had not faced much if any discrimination because of her gender, but noted the social pressures which could inhibit a female artist's career, concluding:

The chief obstacle to a woman's success is that she can never have a wife. Just reflect what a wife does for an artist: Darns the stockings; keeps his house; writes his letters; visits for his benefit; wards off intruders; is personally suggestive of beautiful pictures; always an encouraging and partial critic. It is exceedingly difficult to be an artist without this time-saving help. A husband would be quite useless.

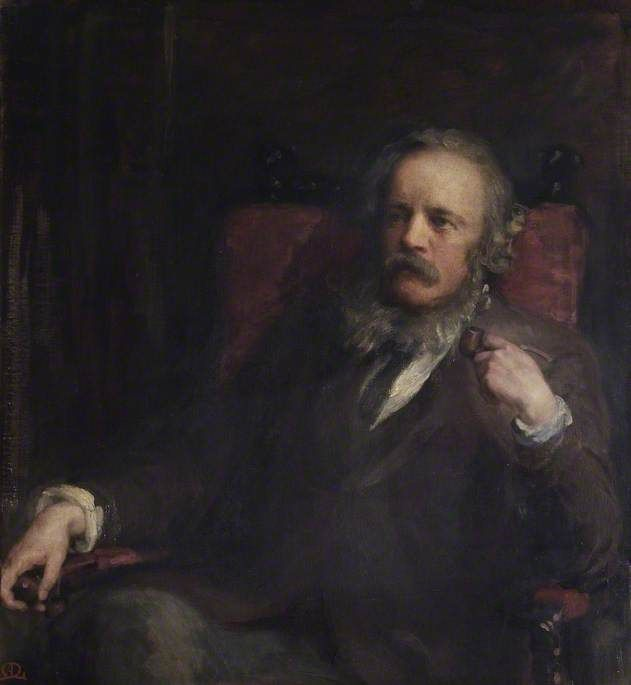
Portrait of her husband, Henry Merritt, 1877

By the late 19th century, as private art academies in Europe and America opened enrollment to female students, a growing number of women were able to train to be professional artists. Most women artists of this era found work in genres of art perceived as less prestigious, such as still-life and portraiture.

Merritt created flower paintings, noting floral-feminine symbolism employed by male artists such as Charles Courtney Curran and Robert Reid. She said that she saw "flowers as 'great ladies'" noting that "theirs is the langour of high breeding, and the repose and calm of weary idleness."

Merritt was influenced by the Pre-Raphaelites, producing a Shakespearean-influenced etching of Ellen Terry as Ophelia and other works that reflected the group's style and spirit.
