= Eve Overcome with Remorse =

Painting by Anna Lea Merritt

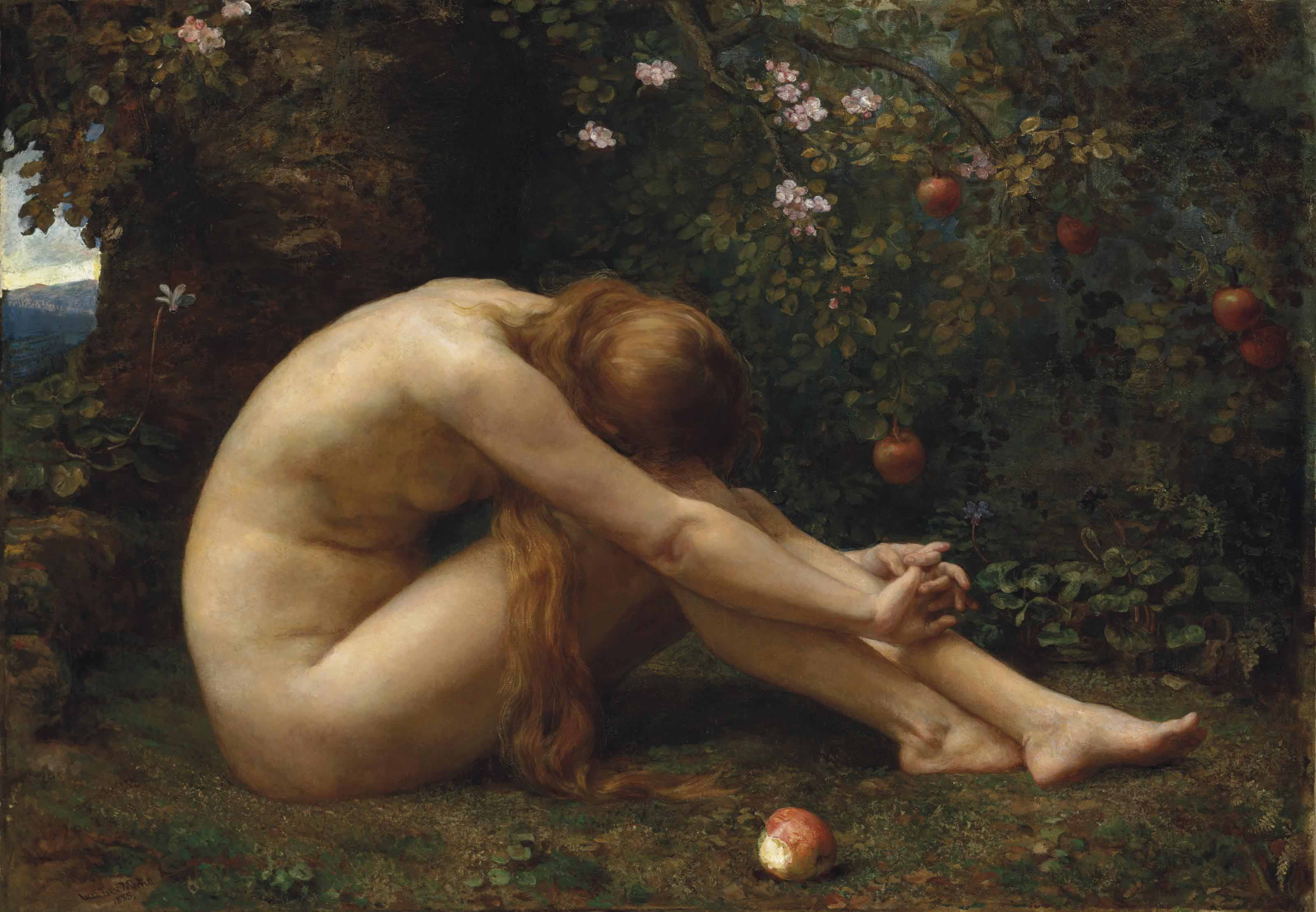
- Artist: Anna Lea Merritt
- Year: 1885
- Medium: Oil on canvas, religious painting
- Dimensions: 76.8 cm × 109.2 cm (30.2 in × 43.0 in)
- Location: Private collection

Eve Overcome with Remorse is an 1885 oil painting by the American-British artist Anna Lea Merritt. Combining nude and religious art it depicts the theme of the Fall of man. Eve sits alone in the Garden of Eden, overcome with regret at having eaten the forbidden fruit in the Garden of Eden.

It reflects changing depictions of Eve during the nineteenth century, as she was now frequently shown alone without Adam. The painting was displayed at the Royal Academy's Summer Exhibition of 1885 at Burlington House in London. The work received mixed reviews at the exhibition and was bought by the architect Alfred Waterhouse. It was also displayed at the World's Columbian Exposition of 1893 in Chicago, where it was awarded a medal.

== Bibliography ==
- Barnes, Gerry & Williamson, Tom. English Orchards: A Landscape History. Windgather Press, 2022.
- Corn, Wanda. Women Building History: Public Art at the 1893 Columbian Exposition. University of California Press, 2023.
- Crosby, Joanna. Apples and Orchards since the Eighteenth Century: Material Innovation and Cultural Tradition. Bloomsbury Publishing, 2023.
