= Margo Jones =

American theater director

- Born: Margaret Virginia Jones; December 12, 1911; Livingston, Texas, U.S.
- Died: July 24, 1955 (aged 43); Dallas, Texas, U.S.
- Occupations: Theater director and producer

Margo Jones (December 12, 1911 – July 24, 1955), nicknamed the "Texas Tornado", was an American stage director and producer, best known for launching the American regional theater movement and for introducing the theater-in-the-round concept in Dallas, Texas. In 1947, she established the first regional professional company when she opened Theatre '47 in Dallas. Of the 85 plays Jones staged during her Dallas career, 57 were new, and one-third of those new plays had a continued life on stage, television, and radio. Jones played an important role in the early careers of a range of playwrights, such as Tennessee Williams, William Inge, Joseph Hayes, Jerome Lawrence, and Robert E. Lee.

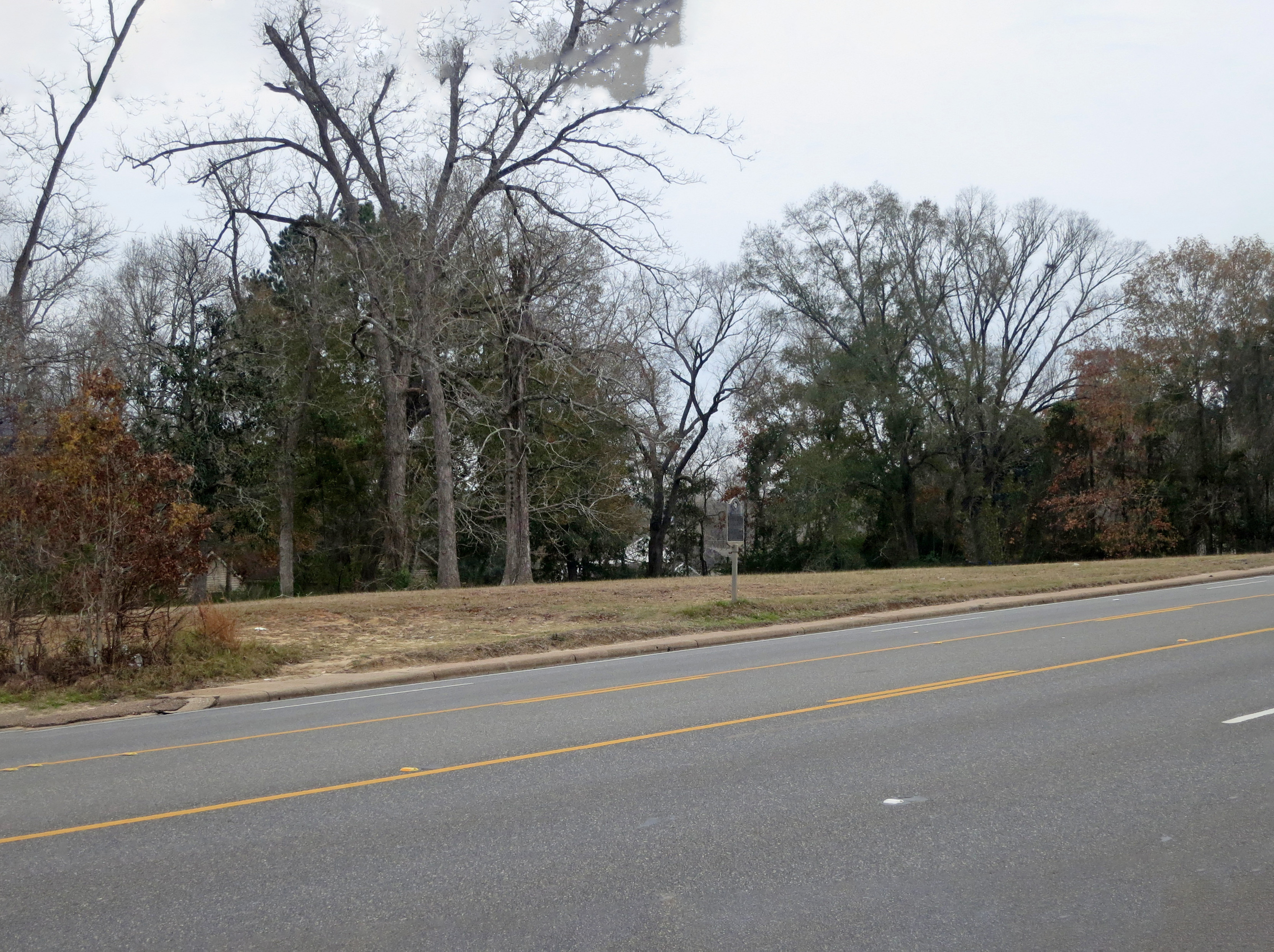
Texas Historical Marker (center) marks the birthplace of Margo Jones in Livingston, Texas

== Early career ==
Born Margaret Virginia Jones in Livingston, Texas, Jones worked in community and professional theaters in California, Houston, and New York City. "Since 1936, Margo Jones had served as assistant director of the Federal Theatre in Houston, traveled to Soviet Russia for a festival at the Moscow Art Theatre, and founded and directed the Houston Community Theatre. She had recently joined the faculty of the University of Texas's drama department in Austin (around 1942)."

She traveled internationally, experiencing theater abroad, and eventually gained commercial success on Broadway as co-director of the original production of The Glass Menagerie by Tennessee Williams. She directed Williams' Summer and Smoke, a flop in its first production, but highly regarded years later. After she directed Maxwell Anderson's successful Joan of Lorraine, starring Ingrid Bergman as Joan of Arc, she was fired during the Washington, DC, tryout. However, her name remained on the marquee and playbills, and no other director was ever credited for the production.

All three plays were filmed. Bergman repeated her Joan of Lorraine role in Joan of Arc (1948), for which she was Oscar-nominated. Geraldine Page was Oscar-nominated for her performance in Summer and Smoke (1961). Since 1950, at least five different film/TV productions of The Glass Menagerie have been made.

== Theater '47 ==
The success of The Glass Menagerie allowed her to take the next step toward her dream of running a repertory theatre outside of New York. She moved back to Dallas and opened Theatre '47. The theater changed its name to the corresponding year every New Year's Eve, but according to the New York Times, was more often simply called "Margo's".

Her theater was in the sleek "Magnolia Lounge" (Magnolia Petroleum Company, later Mobil Oil) building, designed by Swiss-born architect William Lescaze, in 1936, for the Texas Centennial and situated on the grounds of Fair Park in Dallas. The theater was America's first modern nonprofit professional resident theater, and also the first professional arena theater (theater-in-the-round) in the country. Jones was inspired by Franklin Roosevelt's Depression-era National Theater Project and the European arts movement, which she had experienced directly during the 1930s. The resident company was dedicated to staging new plays and classics of world theater rather than revivals of past Broadway hits. The initial season introduced William Inge's first play, Farther Off from Heaven, later revised as The Dark at the Top of the Stairs.

Though touring shows did exist at this time, no quality professional American theatre companies existed outside of New York. Jones believed in the decentralization of theater. She wanted her art to exist all across America, beyond the realm of commercialized Broadway, and this was a key component in the start of the regional-theatre movement. She reasoned, "If we succeeded in inspiring the operation of 30 theatres like ours, the playwright won't need Broadway." Playwrights Inge, Jerome Lawrence, and Robert E. Lee championed this sentiment when they received their first big breaks from Jones' Dallas theater.

Jones envisioned it as a place where actors, writers, and technicians could have steady jobs and not be subject to the problems found in the volatile New York scene. When the Ford Foundation began giving grants outside of New York during the 1950s, the movement gathered momentum and Theatre '47 became the model of how to build a new company.

In her book Theatre-in-the-Round, Jones outlined inexpensive methods to enable companies to get started, detailing valuable information on subscription sales, board development, programming, actor/artist relations, and other issues relevant to new regional-theatre companies. Her theater-in-the-round concept requires no stage curtain or little scenery, and allows the audience to sit on three sides of the stage. The physical space also requires particularly skilled blocking, directing, and acting: "Its mistakes are mistakes seen very close up." Theater-in-the-round staging was used for well-known shows as the original stage production of Man of La Mancha, and all plays staged at the ANTA Washington Square Theatre (demolished in the late 1960s), including Arthur Miller's autobiographical play After the Fall (1964), and through to this day.

== Later career ==
For eight years, Jones balanced her career between Broadway and regional projects. In Dallas, she staged the world premiere of Jerome Lawrence and Robert E. Lee's Inherit the Wind, a fictionalized retelling of the Scopes Monkey Trial, after it had been rejected by several Broadway producers. The play received rave reviews and subsequently opened on Broadway in April 1955, where it became a major hit. Inherit the Wind become an Oscar-nominated film in 1960 and has been revived as a TV special three times.

== Death ==
On July 17, 1955, Jones invited friends over to a party, but during the party she spilled paint on the carpet, so her secretary later brought professional cleaners to deal with it. They used carbon tetrachloride, a strong solvent commonly used in dry-cleaning processes at the time. Jones, satisfied with the cleaning, fell asleep into the night. Unfortunately, some carbon tetrachloride had been absorbed into the carpet and later evaporated, filling her home with toxic fumes. She woke up dizzy; the gas was later found to have caused kidney failure. She was then found unconscious on the couch resting and she was rushed to hospital, but died a week later.

According to her friends, she briefly regained consciousness and found out she was going to die, and made elaborate preparations for her burial, including asking her friends to dress her properly and grooming her for her funeral. She died July 24, 1955, at the age of 43, never realizing what killed her. In 1959, her theater was closed.

== Legacy ==
Jones' innovative ideas inspired the growth of numerous resident companies, and made experiencing the art she loved possible for regions across America. In 1950–55, producer Albert McCleery brought the concept of theater-in-the-round to television with his Cameo Theatre.

The Margo Jones Award was established in 1961 by Jerome Lawrence and Robert E. Lee.

The theater space inside the Magnolia Lounge building has been renamed the Margo Jones Theatre to honor Jones and is the home to several small theater groups.

The television series Curious & Unusual Deaths features an episode in season two about Jones' death.

Jones is a character in the play Kowalski by Gregg Ostrin, written about her friendship with Tennesee Williams.

== Television ==
In 2006, a documentary film about her life and career, Sweet Tornado: Margo Jones and the American Theater, was shown on PBS. With Jones portrayed by Judith Ivey, the film dramatized scenes from her life, adapted from her letters and correspondence with Broadway producers and Tennessee Williams (portrayed by Richard Thomas). The film features interviews with people who worked with her, including actor Ray Walston, who got his first big break in the original production of Summer and Smoke.

== Stage productions ==
Date	Production	Author	Location
1942	The Eve of St. Mark	Maxwell Anderson	University of Texas, Austin
1943	Sporting Pink	Theodore Apstein	University of Texas, Austin
1943	A Choice of Weapons	Theodore Apstein	University of Texas, Austin
1943	You Touched Me	Tennessee Williams	Pasadena Playhouse, California
1945	The Glass Menagerie	Tennessee Williams	Playhouse, New York
1946	On Whitman Avenue	Maxine Wood	Broadway, New York
1946	Joan of Lorraine	Maxwell Anderson	Alvin Theatre, New York
1947	Farther Off From Heaven/The Dark at the Top of the Stairs	William Inge	Theatre '47, Dallas, Texas
1947	Hedda Gabler	Henrik Ibsen	Theatre '47, Dallas, Texas
1947	How Now Hecate	Martyn Coleman	Theatre '47, Dallas, Texas
1947	Summer and Smoke	Tennessee Williams	Theatre '47, Dallas, Texas; Music Box Theatre, New York
1947	Third Cousin	Vera Mathews	Theatre '47, Dallas, Texas
1948	The Master Builder	Henrik Ibsen	Theatre '48, Dallas, Texas
1948	The Taming of the Shrew	William Shakespeare	Theatre '48, Dallas, Texas
1948	The Importance of Being Earnest	Oscar Wilde	Theatre '48, Dallas, Texas
1948	Summer and Smoke	Tennessee Williams	Broadway, New York
1948	Last of My Solid Gold Watches; This Property Is Condemned; Portrait of a Madonna	Tennessee Williams	Theatre '48, Dallas, Texas
1948	Throng o' Scarlet	Vivian Connell	Theatre '48, Dallas, Texas
1948	Lemple's Old Man	Manning Gurain	Theatre '48, Dallas, Texas
1948	Leaf and Bough	Joseph Hayes	Theatre '48, Dallas, Texas
1948	Black John	Barton MacLane	Theatre '48, Dallas, Texas
1949	The Learned Ladies	Molière	Theatre '49, Dallas, Texas
1949	Twelfth Night	William Shakespeare	Theatre '49, Dallas, Texas
1949	The Sea Gull	Anton Chekhov	Theatre '49, Dallas, Texas
1949	She Stoops to Conquer	Oliver Goldsmith	Theatre '49, Dallas, Texas
1949	Here's to Us	Shirland Quin	Theatre '49, Dallas, Texas
1949	Sting in the Tail	Tom Purefoy	Theatre '49, Dallas, Texas
1949	The Coast of Illyria	Dorothy Parker and Ross Evans	Theatre '49, Dallas, Texas
1950	Heartbreak House	George Bernard Shaw	Theatre '50, Dallas, Texas
1950	Ghosts	Henrik Ibsen	Theatre '50, Dallas, Texas
1950	An Old Beat-Up Woman	Sari Scott	Theatre '50, Dallas, Texas
1950	My Granny Van	Loren Disney and George Sessions Perry	Theatre '50, Dallas, Texas
1950	Cock-a-Doodle Dandy	Seán O'Casey	Theatre '50, Dallas, Texas
1950	The Golden Porcupine	Muriel Roy Bolton	Theatre '50, Dallas, Texas
1950	Southern Exposure	Owen Crump	Theatre '50, Dallas, Texas
1950	A Play for Mary	William McCleery	Theatre '50, Dallas, Texas
1950	An Innocent Time	Edward Caufield	Theatre '50, Dallas, Texas
1951	Lady Windermere's Fan	Oscar Wilde	Theatre '51, Dallas, Texas
1951	The Merchant of Venice	William Shakespeare	Theatre '51, Dallas, Texas
1951	Candida	George Bernard Shaw	Theatre '51, Dallas, Texas
1951	A Willow Tree	A. B. Shiffrin	Theatre '51, Dallas, Texas
1951	One Bright Day	Siomund Miller	Theatre '51, Dallas, Texas
1951	Walls Rise Up	Duane, Frank and Richard Shannon	Theatre '51, Dallas, Texas
1951	A Gift for Cathy	Ronald Alexander	Theatre '51, Dallas, Texas
1952	A Midsummer Night's Dream	William Shakespeare	Theatre '52, Dallas, Texas
1952	Sainted Sisters	Alden Nash	Theatre '52, Dallas, Texas
1952	The Blind Spot	Edward Caulfield	Theatre '52, Dallas, Texas
1952	So in Love	Vern Matthews	Theatre '52, Dallas, Texas
1952	I Am Laughing	Edwin Justus Mayer	Theatre '52, Dallas, Texas
1953	Hamlet	William Shakespeare	Theatre '53, Dallas, Texas
1953	The Rivals	Richard Brinsley Sheridan	Theatre '53, Dallas, Texas
1953	Goodbye, Your Majesty	Vivian Connell	Theatre '53, Dallas, Texas
1953	The Rising Heifer	Robin Maugham	Theatre '53, Dallas, Texas
1953	The Last Island	Eugene Raskin	Theatre '53, Dallas, Texas
1953	Late Love	Casey	Theatre '53, Dallas, Texas
1953	Uncle Marston	John Briard Harding	Theatre '53, Dallas, Texas
1953	The Day's Mischief	Lesley Storm	Theatre '53, Dallas, Texas
1954	Volpone	Ben Jonson	Theatre '54, Dallas, Texas
1954	The Footpath Way	Burgess Drake	Theatre '54, Dallas, Texas
1954	The Guilty	Harry Granick	Theatre '54, Dallas, Texas
1954	Happy We'll Be	Samson Raphaelson	Theatre '54, Dallas, Texas
1954	Oracle Junction	Samson Raphaelson	Theatre '54, Dallas, Texas
1954	The Heel	Samson Raphaelson	Theatre '54, Dallas, Texas
1954	A Rainbow at Home	Milton Robertson	Theatre '54, Dallas, Texas
1954	Horatio	Wallach, David Baker, and Harnick	Theatre '54, Dallas, Texas
1954	The Purification	Tennessee Williams	Theatre '54, Dallas, Texas
1954	Apollo of Bellac	Jean Giraudoux	Theatre '54, Dallas, Texas
1954	The Brothers	John S. Rodell	Theatre '54, Dallas, Texas
1954	A Dash of Bitters	Reginald Denham and Conrad Sutton-Smith	Theatre '54, Dallas, Texas
1954	Sea-Change	William Case	Theatre '54, Dallas, Texas
1954	The Hemlock Cup	Edward Hunt	Theatre '54, Dallas, Texas
1955	As You Like It	William Shakespeare	Theatre '55, Dallas, Texas
1955	Inherit the Wind	Jerome Lawrence and Robert Edwin Lee	Theatre '55, Dallas, Texas
1955	Whisper to Me	William Goyen and Greer Johnson	Theatre '55, Dallas, Texas
1955	La Belle Lulu	Jacques Offenbach and Charles Previn	Theatre '55, Dallas, Texas
1955	The Girl from Boston	Joseph Hayes	Theatre '55, Dallas, Texas

== Listen to ==
- Clips of interviews with Albert J. Devlin, Judith Ivey, Helen Sheehy, and Jerome Weeks conducted by Kay Cattarulla and Rob Tranchin for Sweet Tornado: Margo Jones and the American Theater:

== Book ==
- Jones, Margo (1951). Theatre-in-the-round. New York: McGraw Book Coy.

== Sources ==
- Sheehy, Helen (1989). Margo: The Life and Theatre of Margo Jones. Dallas: Southern Methodist University Press. ISBN 9780870742965. ISBN 0-870-74296-5
