= Mame (musical) =

Musical

- Original Broadway Poster
- Music: Jerry Herman
- Lyrics: Jerry Herman
- Book: Jerome Lawrence; Robert Edwin Lee
- Basis: Auntie Mame by Patrick Dennis
- Productions: 1966 Broadway; 1967 Tour; 1968 Los Angeles; 1968 Australia; 1968 Las Vegas; 1969 Tour; 1969 West End; 1983 Broadway revival

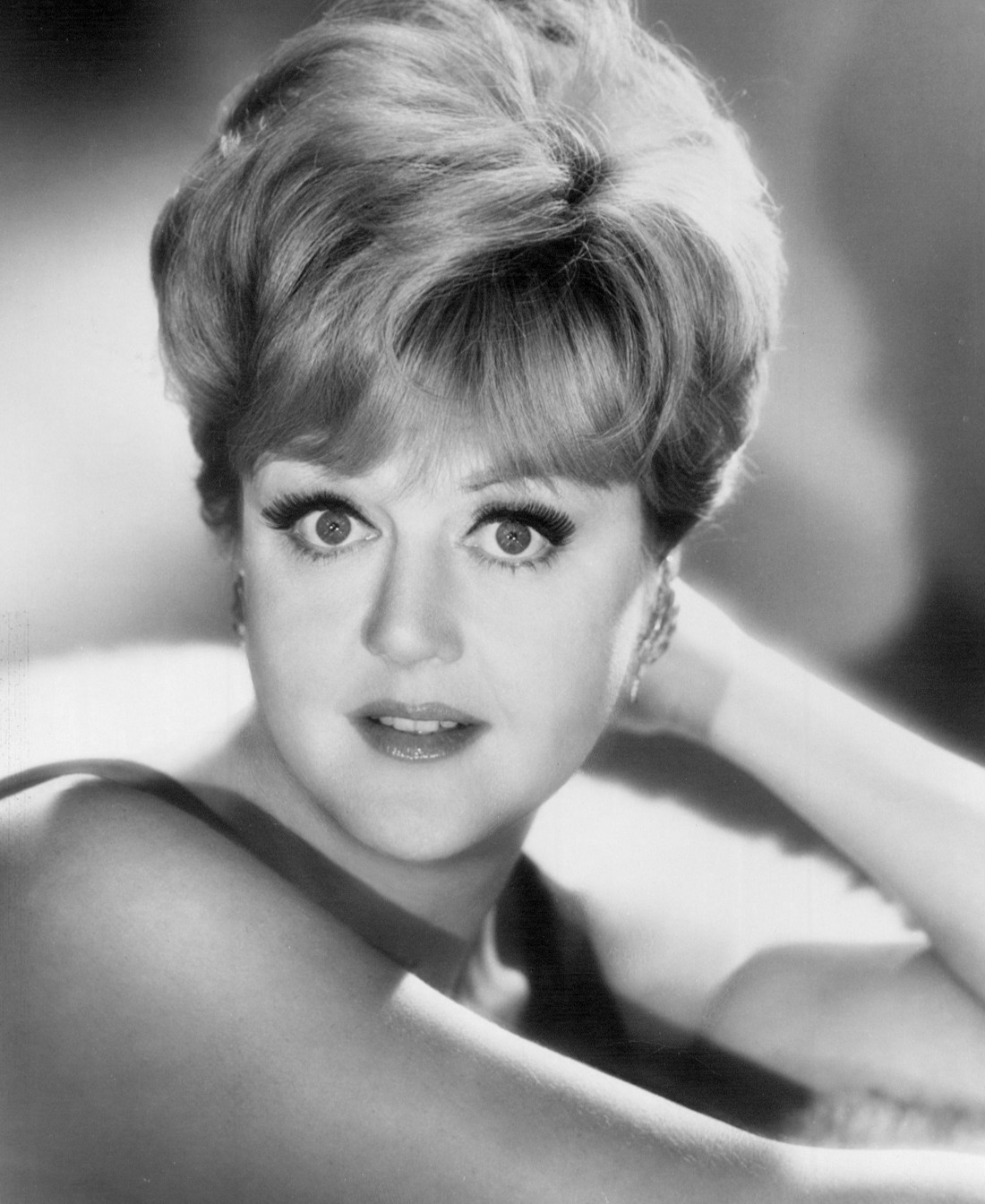
Angela Lansbury, 1966

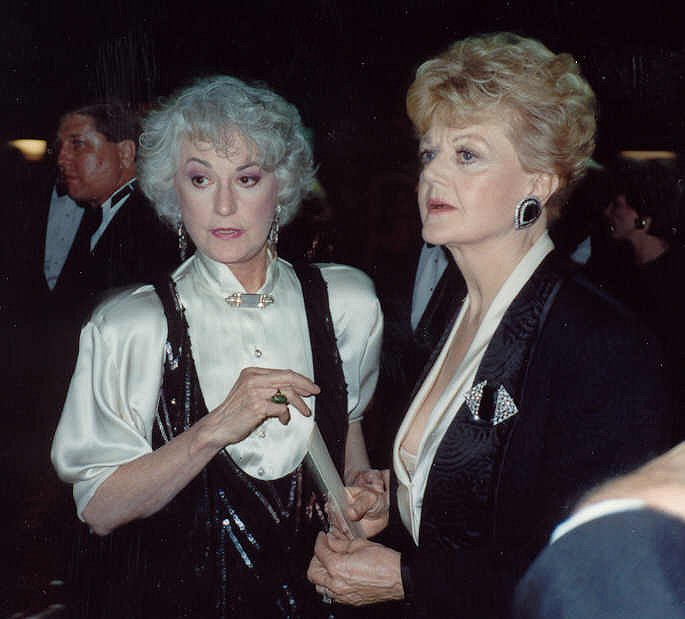
Original Broadway cast members Bea Arthur and Angela Lansbury at the 41st annual Emmy Awards (1989). The two remained close friends over the years.

Mame is a musical with a book by Jerome Lawrence and Robert Edwin Lee and music and lyrics by Jerry Herman. Originally titled My Best Girl, it is based on the 1955 novel Auntie Mame by Patrick Dennis and the 1956 Broadway play of the same name by Lawrence and Lee. A period piece set in New York City and spanning the Great Depression and World War II, it focuses on eccentric bohemian Mame Dennis, whose famous motto is "Life is a banquet and most poor sons of bitches are starving to death." Her fabulous life with her wealthy friends is interrupted when the young son of her late brother arrives to live with her. They cope with the Depression in a series of adventures.

The musical opened on Broadway in 1966, starring Angela Lansbury and Bea Arthur. The production became a hit and spawned a 1974 film version with Lucille Ball in the title role, and Arthur reprising her supporting role; as well as a London production, a Broadway revival, and a 40th anniversary revival at the Kennedy Center in 2006.

== Background ==
The musical was inspired by the success of the 1956 Broadway comedy and subsequent 1958 film version starring Rosalind Russell, as well as the 1955 novel by Patrick Dennis. According to Stephen Citron, in Jerry Herman: Poet of the Showtune, the "kudos [for Auntie Mame] made all involved immediately think of musicalizing the play." Dennis wrote several more comic novels, including a sequel, Around the World with Auntie Mame, and Little Me, which was made into a Broadway musical starring Sid Caesar. The success of that musical may have prompted Lawrence and Lee to turn Mame into a musical.

Rosalind Russell didn’t want the role, Mary Martin backed out after her initial acceptance, and Ethel Merman declined. The producers “heard from—or considered…Eve Arden, Lauren Bacall, Lucille Ball, Kaye Ballard, Constance Bennett, Georgia Brown, Kitty Carlisle, Barbara Cook, Bette Davis, Doris Day, Olivia de Havilland, Phyllis Diller, Irene Dunne, Nanette Fabray, Arlene Francis, Judy Garland, Greer Garson, Mitzi Gaynor, Dolores Gray, Tammy Grimes, Julie Harris, Susan Hayward, Katharine Hepburn, Lena Horne, Lisa Kirk, Margaret Leighton, Beatrice Lillie, Gisele MacKenzie, Jane Morgan, Patrice Munsel, Geraldine Page, Ginger Rogers, Dinah Shore, Simone Signoret, Maggie Smith, Elaine Stritch—and…Angela Lansbury," who was eventually cast.”

For its second run, Jerry Herman wanted to cast Judy Garland, but that request was denied by the producers of the show, who deemed her a liability.

According to Herman it took six months to write the score.

== Productions ==
=== Original Broadway ===
The musical opened on Broadway at the Winter Garden Theatre on May 24, 1966. Three years later, it transferred to The Broadway Theatre, where it remained until closing on January 3, 1970. Between the two venues, it ran a total of 1,508 performances and five previews. The musical was directed by Gene Saks, choreographed by Onna White with scenic design by William and Jean Eckart, costume design by Robert Mackintosh, lighting design by Tharon Musser and orchestrations by Philip J. Lang. Besides Lansbury as Mame, the cast included Bea Arthur as Vera Charles, Frankie Michaels as Patrick, Jane Connell as Agnes Gooch, Charles Braswell as Beauregard Jackson Pickett Burnside, and Willard Waterman (who had played Claude Upson in the 1958 film) as Dwight Babcock. The original cast also included future Tony Award nominated choreographer Scott Salmon in his Broadway debut in the small part of Mame's friend.

Lansbury, Arthur and Michaels all won Tony Awards, while Saks, White, the writers, Herman, and set designers William and Jean Eckart all received nominations.

When Lansbury took a two-week vacation in August 1967, Celeste Holm played the title role, prior to heading the National Tour, and "garnered ecstatic reviews" including from The New York Times. When Lansbury left the Broadway production on March 30, 1968, to take the show on a limited US tour, Janis Paige was the star chosen to be the new Broadway Mame, starting in April 1968. Paige's run and the show itself continued to be so successful that she was followed by Jane Morgan (December 1968), who was followed by Ann Miller (May 1969).

=== US national tours ===
Celeste Holm, who played the role on Broadway for two weeks when Lansbury took a vacation, continued in the role in the first national tour. The cast also included Loretta Swit and Wesley Addy. This production toured from August 29, 1967 to June 15, 1968.

When Lansbury left the Broadway production, she led a brief two-stop California tour that played the Curran Theatre in San Francisco from April 30 to June 23, 1968 and the Dorothy Chandler Pavilion in Los Angeles from June 25 to August 31. This production starred Anne Francine, who had replaced Arthur on Broadway, and Connell.

A third tour opened in New Haven, Connecticut in January, 1969. It starred Janet Blair as Mame and Elaine Stritch as Vera. This tour closed the following May in Louisville, Kentucky.

A fourth tour opened the following September in Hartford, Connecticut starring Sheila Smith. Patrice Munsel and Anne Russell later led this tour. It closed in June, 1970.

Juliet Prowse led a fifth tour in 1990, produced by Theatre Under The Stars. Delphi Lawrence reprised her role of Vera from the 1968 Las Vegas production.

=== Australia ===
The Australian production presented by J. C. Williamson's opened at Her Majesty's Theatre, Melbourne on May 25, 1968, and subsequently played seasons in Adelaide, Perth and Sydney. Gaylea Byrne starred as Mame Dennis, alongside Mary Hardy as Agnes Gooch, Sheila Bradley as Vera Charles and Geoff Hiscock as Beauregard.

=== West End ===
The 1969 West End production starred Ginger Rogers in the title role and Margaret Courtenay as Vera. It ran for a fourteen-month engagement at the Theatre Royal, Drury Lane with a special performance for Queen Elizabeth II. Victor Woolf was the stage manager for this production.

=== Other productions ===
Susan Hayward appeared in the Las Vegas production, while such stars as Ann Sothern, Janet Blair, Jane Russell, Elaine Stritch, Edie Adams, Patrice Munsel, Kitty Carlisle, Carol Lawrence, Shani Wallis, Jo Anne Worley, and Sheila Smith appeared in stock, regional or touring productions.

In 1976, a Mexican production was performed in Mexico City with Silvia Pinal in the title role and Evangelina Elizondo as Vera. In 1985, Pinal reprised the production with the Spanish actress María Rivas as Vera. In 2014/2015, a Mexican new production was performed in Mexico with Itati Cantoral and Alicia Machado in the title role and Dalilah Polanco as Vera.

Despite the presence of Lansbury, a much-heralded Broadway revival was ultimately unsuccessful. After seven previews, it opened on July 24, 1983, at the George Gershwin Theatre, where it ran for only 41 performances.

Juliet Prowse, who in August 1969 subbed for Ginger Rogers in the original West End production of Mame, would subsequently reprise the title role in a number of US productions, led off by a 1970 Dallas Summer Musicals production whose cast included Jane Connell as Gooch, Ruth Gillette as Mrs. Burnside/Mrs. Upson, and William LeMassena as Babcock. In the autumn of 1970 Prowse headlined Mame at the Westgate Las Vegas (then known as the International Hotel) in a production featuring reprises by Jane Connell and Ruth Gillette, with Upson being played by Connell's husband Gordon Connell and Vera played by Anne Francine who had replaced Beatrice Arthur in the original Broadway production: by 1983, which year Francine reprised (briefly) the role on Broadway, Francine had played Vera some 800 times. The Westgate production of Mame also featured John McCook as adult Patrick. Prowse resumed headlining Mame in a 1989–1990 North American tour whose cast included Meghan Duffy as Gooch, Thomas Hill as Upson, and Delphi Lawrence as Vera. Subsequent to headlining Mame at Harrah's Lake Tahoe in the summer of 1992, Prowse headlined a production of Mame which played the Alex Theatre (Glendale) and also Spreckels Theater (San Diego) in respectively April and May 1994 with a cast which included Franklin Cover as Babcock and Marsha Kramer as Gooch.

In July–August 1991 Mariette Hartley headlined the St. Louis Municipal Opera Theatre production of Mame whose cast also included Georgia Engel as Gooch, Alan Muraoka as Ito, and Gretchen Wyler as Vera.

In the mid-90s, a concert staging was done for BBC Radio 4. The cast included Julia McKenzie as Mame, Libby Morris as Vera, Claire Moore as Agnes, Bob Sessions as Mr. Babcock, Jon Lee as Young Patrick, David Kernan as Beauregard, and Robert Meadmore as Older Patrick.

In 1999, The Production Company in Melbourne, Australia staged Mame for their very first season, starring Rhonda Burchmore and Pamela Rabe. In 2008, The Production Company staged Mame once more, in celebration for their tenth anniversary, with Rhonda Burchmore reprising her role.

The Paper Mill Playhouse (Millburn, New Jersey) production of Mame in September and October 1999 was headlined by Christine Ebersole and featured Kelly Bishop as Vera and Paul Iacono as Young Patrick.

The Kennedy Center production ran from June 1, 2006 to July 2, and starred Christine Baranski as Mame, Harriet Sansom Harris as Vera, and Emily Skinner as Gooch.

Michele Lee headlined a single performance production of Mame at the Hollywood Bowl on 1 August 2004 whose cast also included Allyce Beasley as Gooch, Ben Platt as Young Patrick, Christine Ebersole as Vera, Jennifer Hall as Gloria, Lauri Johnson doubling as Madame Branislowski and Mrs. Burnside, Edie McClurg as Mrs. Upson, Robert Picardo as Babcock, Alan Thicke as Mr. Upson, John Schneider as Beauregard, and Fred Willard as Woolsey. Lee would subsequently headline the Pittsburgh Civic Light Opera production of Mame in July 2008, which featured Donna Lynne Champlin as Gooch.

The first UK production of Mame in 50 years opened at the Hope Mill Theatre (Manchester) in September 2019, directed by Nick Winston with Tracie Bennett headlining a cast which included Tim Flavin as Beauregard, Harriet Thorpe as Vera, and Pippa Winslow doubling as Sally Cato and Mrs. Upson. With Darren Day replacing Flavin, the production encored at the Royal & Derngate Theatre (Northampton) and Salisbury Playhouse in respectively January and May 2020. The show received seven WhatsOnStage Award nominations.

== Adaptations ==
A 1974 film version of the musical starred Lucille Ball as Mame, Bea Arthur reprising her role as Vera Charles, Jane Connell reprising her role as Agnes Gooch and Robert Preston as Beauregard. It was both a US box office failure and a critical disappointment with Ball being considered not up to the musical demands of the title role.

== Synopsis ==
=== Act 1 ===
The recently orphaned Patrick Dennis and his nanny, Agnes Gooch, arrive in Manhattan. Patrick has been placed under the care of his aunt, the eccentric Mame Dennis, with Dwight Babcock as his trustee. The two head to Mame’s residence (“St. Bridget”), where a party is in full swing (“It’s Today”). Mame introduces Patrick to her collection of kooky friends, such as Vera Charles, a baritone actress and the First Lady of the American Theatre; Ralph Divine, the runner of a progressive school called “The Laboratory of Life”; and M. Lindsay Woolsey, a book publisher.

Two weeks pass, and Babcock arrives to discuss Patrick’s schooling. Mame wishes for Patrick to go to a co-educational liberal arts school, while Babcock demands that he go to a conservative school. However, Mame decides to instead enroll Patrick into The Laboratory of Life and take him on adventures without Babcock’s knowledge (“Open a New Window”).

Mame and Patrick’s escapades are cut short by Babcock, who has discovered Mame’s deceit and angrily takes Patrick off to boarding school, devastating Mame. To make matters worse, Mame loses her fortune in the Wall Street Crash of 1929. Vera proposes Mame join her in a new operetta. However, the operetta goes disastrously, with Mame showing up on stage late and falling during her moment (“The Moon Song” (The Man in the Moon)). Mame is fired from the theatre, but Patrick arrives and comforts her (“My Best Girl”).

Mame gets a new job at a hairdressers and there she meets Beauregard Jackson Pickett Burnside. While giving him a manicure, she gets flustered and causes him to bleed. She’s fired once more, despite Beau’s protests, and returns to her residence, where Patrick is staying for three days. To lighten the mood, Mame reveals presents she bought for Patrick, Ito, and Agnes, declaring “We Need a Little Christmas”. The four celebrate as Beau enters and offers to take Mame, and the other three, to dinner. Mame accepts and the five of them exit merrily.

Beau takes Mame and Patrick to his family home in Georgia, to the ire of Beau’s family, especially Sally Cato. Sally calls for a hunt and makes an attempt on Mame’s life by giving her a mad horse. To everyone’s shock, Mame returns with the fox alive (“The Fox Hunt”). Beau proposes to Mame, she accepts, and everyone sings Mame’s praises (“Mame”). Patrick, Beau, and Mame embrace (“Finale Act 1”).

=== Act 2 ===
Patrick, as he grows up, writes several letters to the now married Mame, and she writes back (“Opening Act Two” (The Letter)). When Mame discovers that Patrick’s roommate is Babcock’s son, she insists to Beau that she must return to Patrick. Mame and Beau’s honeymoon is cut short with Beau’s sudden death. Once again, Patrick comforts Mame (“My Best Girl” (Reprise)).

Vera, Patrick, and Lindsay decide that Mame should write a book on her life, with Agnes as her secretary, which Mame agrees to. Vera and Mame catch up, declaring each other “Bosom Buddies”. Mame and Vera learn that Agnes is so repressed that she has never dated before and can’t say the word “sex”. Mame declares to Agnes “Life’s a banquet and most poor sons of bitches are starving to death.” Vera and Mame glam the now excited Agnes up and send her out into the world.

Six months pass, and Patrick reveals that he has a fiancée, Gloria Upson. Agnes returns pregnant and recounts her adventures (“Gooch’s Song”). Mame allows Agnes to stay with her as Patrick invites Mame to go see the Upsons in Connecticut.

Mame arrives at the Upsons estate, or as they call it “Upson Downs”, where Babcock is also visiting. Mame is introduced to the boorish and bigoted Upsons, as well as Junior Babcock. The Upsons and the older Babcock leave momentarily and Mame dances with the party guests (“That’s How Young I Feel”). The Upsons reveal to Mame their plans for a wedding gift to Patrick and Gloria: an empty plot of land next to the Upson’s estate, hoping that “the wrong people” don’t move in. Mame conceals her disapproval and speaks to Patrick in private and begs him to reconsider. Patrick leaves in a huff and Mame questions where she went wrong in raising him (“If He Walked Into My Life”).

Mame convinces Patrick to invite the Upsons to her newly renovated apartment. Patrick meets the designer, Pegeen Ryan, another student of The Laboratory of Life. The Upsons arrive and Mame introduces them to her cooky friends and lifestyle (“It’s Today” (Reprise)). Mame reveals that she bought the plot of land to make a home for single mothers. The Upsons storm out and Gloria dumps Patrick. Mame declares that all this was for Patrick, who thanks her (“My Best Girl” (Reprise)).

Years pass, Pegeen and Patrick are now married and have a son, Peter. Mame plans to take Peter to India, to the disapproval of his parents. Peter recites Mame’s mantra, which convinces Pegeen and Patrick to allow Peter to go with Mame. She leaves with Peter as she promises to take him on a myriad of adventures (“Finale Act II”).

== Principal casts ==
| Character | Broadway (1966) | Tour (1967–68) | California (1968) | Las Vegas (1968–69) | Tour (1969) | West End (1969) | Tour (1969–70) | Broadway Revival (1983) | Tour (1990) | Kennedy Center (2006) |
|---|---|---|---|---|---|---|---|---|---|---|
| Mame Dennis | Angela Lansbury | Celeste Holm | Angela Lansbury | Susan Hayward (replaced by Celeste Holm) | Janet Blair | Ginger Rogers | Sheila Smith | Angela Lansbury | Juliet Prowse | Christine Baranski |
| Vera Charles | Bea Arthur | Vicki Cummings | Anne Francine | Delphi Lawrence | Elaine Stritch | Margaret Courtenay | Sandy Sprung | Anne Francine | Delphi Lawrence | Harriet Sansom Harris |
| Agnes Gooch | Jane Connell | Loretta Swit | Jane Connell | Loretta Swit | Isabelle Farrell | Ann Beach | Isabelle Farrell | Jane Connell | Meghan Duffy | Emily Skinner |
| Dwight Babcock | Willard Waterman | Wesley Addy | Willard Waterman | Rufus Smith | Sam Kressen | Guy Spaull | Sam Kressen | Willard Waterman | Jim Bernhard | Michael L. Forrest |
| Young Patrick | Frankie Michaels | Shawn McGill | Stuart Getz | Shawn McGill | Darel Glaser | Gary Warren | Darel Glaser | Roshi Handwerger | Joseph R. Sasnett | Harrison Chad |
| Beauregard Burnside | Charles Braswell | Robert R. Kaye | Charles Braswell | John Vivyan | Richard Higgs | Barry Kent | Brian Moore | Scot Stewart | John Almberg | Jeff McCarthy |
| Patrick Dennis | Jerry Lanning | John Stewart | Jerry Lanning | Roger Rathburn | Sean Allan | Tony Adams | Peter Shawn | Bryon Nease | John Scherer | Max von Essen |
| Sally Cato | Margaret Hall | Betty McGuire | Cathryn Damon | Betty McGuire | Anne Russell | Betty Winsett | Anne Russell | Barbara Lang | Jennie Welch | Alison Cimmet |
| M. Lindsay Woolsey | George Coe | William Gibberson | Robert Goss | Robert Goss | Chet London | Barry Jackson | Alan Sanderson | Donald Torres | Frank Joachimsthaler | Ed Dixon |
| Ito | Sab Shimono | Arsenio Trinidad | Sab Shimono | Alvin Ing | Franklin Siu | Burt Kwouk | Arsenio Trinidad | Sab Shimono | Frank Kamai | Alan Muraoka |
| Junior Babcock | Randy Kirby | Gerry Dalton | Roy Smith | role cut for time | Larry Burton | Ken Walsh | Bill Biskup | Patrick Sean Murphy | Kevin Bernard | Shane Braddock |
| Mr. Upson | John C. Becher | David Huddleston | Gordon Connell | Tom Batten | Ed Fuller | Norman MacLeod | Ed Fuller | John C. Becher | Thomas Hill | Harry A. Winter |
| Mrs. Upson | Johanna Douglas | Louise Kirtland | Lorraine MacMartin | Ruth Gillette | Louise Kirtland | Sheila Keith | Hazel Steck | Louise Kirtland | Cheryl Massey-Peters | Ruth Gottschall |
| Gloria Upson | Diana Walker | Stacey Jones | Ann Willis | Dorothy Poiselle | Gail Hecht | Julia McKenzie | Sandi Smith | Michaela Hughes | Michelle DeJean | Sarah Jane Everman |
| Mother Burnside | Charlotte Jones | Ruth Gillette | Tally Brown | Ruth Gillette | Louise Kirtland | Sheila Keith | Hazel Steck | Fran Stevens | Lou Ann Miles | Mary Stout |
| Pegeen Ryan | Diane Coupe | Kathryn Malone | SuEllen Estey | Rosemary Harvey | Marsha Hastings | Jill Howard | Deborah St. Peter | Ellyn Arons | Darchell Stevens | Melissa Rae Mahon |

=== Notable Broadway replacements ===
Mame: Celeste Holm, Ann Miller, Jane Morgan, Janis Paige

Vera: Anne Francine, Audrey Christie

Agnes: Helen Gallagher

== Musical numbers ==
Act I

- Overture − Orchestra
- "St. Bridget" − Young Patrick and Agnes
- "It's Today" − Mame, Vera, and Company
- "Open a New Window" − Mame, Young Patrick, and Company
- "The Moon Song" (The Man in the Moon) − Vera, Mame, and Company
- "My Best Girl" − Young Patrick and Mame
- "We Need a Little Christmas" − Mame, Young Patrick, Agnes, Ito, and Beauregard
- "The Fox Hunt" − Uncle Jeff, Young Patrick, Cousin Fan, and Mother Burnside
- "Mame" − Beauregard and Company
- Finale Act I ("My Best Girl" and "Mame") − Young Patrick and Company

Act II

- Entr'acte − Orchestra
- "Opening Act Two" (The Letter) − Young Patrick and Older Patrick
- "My Best Girl (reprise)" − Older Patrick
- "Bosom Buddies" − Mame and Vera
- "Gooch's Song" − Agnes Gooch
- "That's How Young I Feel" − Mame, Junior, and Company
- "If He Walked Into My Life" − Mame
- "It's Today" (reprise) − Mame and Company
- "My Best Girl" (reprise) − Older Patrick
- Finale Act II ("Open A New Window") − All
- Curtain Calls ("It's Today", "We Need a Little Christmas" and "Mame") − All

=== Recording ===
A cast recording of the Broadway production was released on the Columbia Masterworks label in 1966. A CD version, with five bonus tracks, was released by Legacy Recordings in 1999. The bonus tracks include demo versions of "St. Bridget", "It's Today", "Open a New Window", and "Mame", as well as the song "Camouflage" (intended to be sung between Mame Dennis and Vera Charles prior to the discussion of whether Patrick could stay with Mame), all performed by Jerry Herman and Alice Borden. (Another cut song, "Love is only Love", was to be sung by Mame to Patrick before "The Fox Hunt"; it was later used in the movie version of Hello, Dolly!.)

In 1966, Bobby Darin, Louis Armstrong, and Herb Alpert all charted in the United States and Canada with their cover records of the musical's title song. Eydie Gormé had a huge success with her recording of "If He Walked into My Life", for which she received a 1967 Grammy Award for Best Female Vocal Performance. "We Need a Little Christmas" is a well known holiday tune and can be heard in several Disney Christmas parades.

== Awards and nominations ==
=== Original Broadway production ===
| Year | Award | Category | Nominee | Result |
|---|---|---|---|---|
| 1966 | Tony Award | Best Musical | | Nominated |
| 1966 | Tony Award | Best Composer and Lyricist | Jerry Herman | Nominated |
| 1966 | Tony Award | Best Performance by a Leading Actress in a Musical | Angela Lansbury | Won |
| 1966 | Tony Award | Best Performance by a Featured Actor in a Musical | Frankie Michaels | Won |
| 1966 | Tony Award | Best Performance by a Featured Actress in a Musical | Beatrice Arthur | Won |
| 1966 | Tony Award | Best Direction of a Musical | Gene Saks | Nominated |
| 1966 | Tony Award | Best Choreography | Onna White | Nominated |
| 1966 | Tony Award | Best Scenic Design | William and Jean Eckart | Nominated |
| 1966 | Theatre World Award | | Jerry Lanning | Won |
| 1967 | Theatre World Award | | Sheila Smith | Won |

== See also ==
- Auntie Mame, the fictional novel by Patrick Dennis.
