= Mame (film) =

1974 film by Gene Saks

- Original film poster by Bob Peak
- Directed by: Gene Saks
- Written by: Paul Zindel (screenplay); Patrick Dennis (novel, "Auntie Mame")
- Based on: Mame by Jerome Lawrence and Robert Edwin Lee
- Produced by: James Cresson; Robert Fryer
- Starring: Lucille Ball; Beatrice Arthur; Robert Preston; Bruce Davison; Jane Connell
- Cinematography: Philip H. Lathrop
- Edited by: Maury Winetrobe
- Music by: Jerry Herman
- Production company: ABC
- Distributed by: Warner Bros.
- Release dates: March 7, 1974 (New York City); March 27, 1974 (Los Angeles)
- Running time: 132 minutes
- Country: United States
- Language: English
- Budget: $12 million
- Box office: $6.5 million

Mame is a 1974 American Technicolor musical film in Panavision based on the 1966 Broadway musical of the same name (itself based on the 1958 film Auntie Mame) and the 1955 novel Auntie Mame by Patrick Dennis.

The film was directed by Gene Saks and adapted by Paul Zindel, and starred Lucille Ball, Beatrice Arthur, Bruce Davison, Robert Preston, and Jane Connell. The musical numbers were choreographed by Onna White.

The story focuses on the madcap life of Mame Dennis (Ball), which is disrupted when she becomes the guardian of her deceased brother's son. She marries a wealthy Southern plantation owner (Preston), is widowed, yet through it all, with the help of her dearest friend, Vera Charles (Arthur), manages to keep things under control.

== Plot ==
In late 1928, at the reading of the will of young Patrick Dennis's father, a trustee, Mr. Babcock, reveals that Patrick is to be left in the care of his aunt, Mame Dennis, and his nanny, Agnes Gooch. Mame wants to fill the child's life with adventure, but when Babcock finds out that she has enrolled Patrick in a non-traditional school, Patrick is taken from Mame's custody. Simultaneously, the stock market crash leaves Mame penniless. She manages to keep her home. Mame's friend, actress Vera Charles, offers Mame a small role in her newest show as "The Man in the Moon." Mame flubs her one line and causes the play to be a disaster, which puts a major rift in their friendship. Patrick reassures Mame that he still loves her.

A desperate Mame takes a job in a department store, where she meets Beauregard Jackson Pickett Burnside, to whom she attempts to sell a pair of roller skates. She cannot write up a cash order and is fired. At home, Mame decides to lift everyone's spirits by decorating the house for Christmas and giving everyone their gifts early. Her hired help pays off the butcher until the following September.

Burnside appears at her front door and invites everyone to dinner. Mame and her servants all agree that Mr. Burnside is like Santa Claus; Mame says that Santa is more like Rhett Butler. They fall in love and move to his family's plantation in Peckerwood, Georgia. At first, Burnside's relatives are unhappy about his marrying a Yankee, but when Mame captures the fox in a fox hunt, they sing her praises.

The Burnsides go on an extended honeymoon, traveling all over the world. Meanwhile, Patrick goes from a young child who pulls in a B+ average to a high school senior failing many classes. When Burnside dies in an avalanche, Mame returns home to be reunited with a now-grown Patrick, who is dating a snobby, conservative girl named Gloria Upson.

When Mame meets Vera for a drink, the two trade snippy comments, which they insist are not being made out of hatred, but simple honesty, as that is what "Bosom Buddies" do. The two come home and reminisce about men they have dated. Agnes, who is listening to the conversation, admits that she is never had a date. Mame and Vera decide to give the uptight, frumpy Agnes a makeover and send her out to live. Six months later, Agnes returns home, pregnant, and describes what she did while living it up.

Mame visits the Upsons at their home in Connecticut, where she learns that Patrick and Gloria are engaged. After finding the Upsons to be insufferable bores and bigots, Mame is asked to help pay for a piece of property next door so that Patrick and Gloria could live there, as opposed to "the wrong kind of people". Afterward, she is candid with Patrick about her disdain for the family. Patrick admits that he is ashamed of her and her "crazy" friends. A heartbroken Mame wonders what she did wrong with this boy she raised.

Mame and Patrick apologize to each other at her home. They are dressed for company: the Upsons. Mame promises to behave and Patrick meets Mame's new maid, Pegeen. Mr. and Mrs. Upson announce that the property they wanted has been bought by some "Jew lawyer". Besides the Upsons, Mame has also invited a busload of pregnant but unmarried girls like Agnes, scandalizing the Upsons further. Then, Mame reveals that she bought the property next door so she could build the Beauregard Burnside Memorial Home For Single Mothers. This is the final straw, and the Upsons leave, angry that Mame is not "one of us." Patrick, visibly upset, also leaves.

Years later, following World War II, Patrick and Pegeen are married and have a child, Peter. Mame, who is going on a trip to Siberia, requests that Peter be allowed to go with her. The two get onto a plane, and Patrick states that Mame has not changed. Mame and Peter wave goodbye and go into the plane.

== Cast ==
- Lucille Ball as "Auntie Mame" Dennis Burnside
- Robert Preston as Beauregard Jackson Pickett Burnside
- Beatrice Arthur as Vera Charles
- Bruce Davison as Patrick Dennis

- Kirby Furlong as young Patrick Dennis

- Jane Connell as Agnes Gooch
- Joyce Van Patten as Sally Cato
- Lucille Benson as Mother Burnside
- George Chiang as Ito
- Doria Cook-Nelson as Gloria Upson
- Don Porter as Mr. Upson
- Audrey Christie as Mrs. Upson
- John McGiver as Mr. Babcock
- Bobbi Jordan as Pegeen
- Patrick Labyorteaux as Peter
- Ruth McDevitt as Cousin Fan
- Burt Mustin as Uncle Jeff
- James Brodhead as Floorwalker
- Leonard Stone as Stage Manager
- Roger Price as Ralph Divine
- John Wheeler as Judge Bregoff
- Ned Wertimer as Fred Kates
- Alice Nunn as Fat Lady
- Jerry Ayres as Bunny
- Michele Nichols as Midge
- Eric Gordon as Boyd
- Barbara Bosson as Emily

== Musical numbers ==
1. "Main Title Including St. Bridget" – Agnes, Orchestra
2. "It's Today" – Mame, Orchestra
3. "Open a New Window" – Mame, young Patrick
4. "The Man in the Moon" – Vera, Chorus
5. "My Best Girl" – Mame, young Patrick
6. "We Need a Little Christmas" – Mame, Agnes, Ito, young Patrick
7. "Mame" – Beau, Chorus
8. "Loving You" – Beau
9. "The Letter" – young Patrick, adult Patrick
10. "Bosom Buddies" – Mame, Vera
11. "Gooch's Song" – Agnes
12. "If He Walked Into My Life" – Mame
13. "It's Today" (reprise) – Mame
14. "Open a New Window" (reprise) – Mame, adult Patrick
15. "Finale (Open a New Window/Mame)" – Mame, Chorus

== Production ==
=== Casting ===
Warner Bros. executives had Elizabeth Taylor in mind in the role of "Auntie Mame" Dennis Burnside. They passed over Angela Lansbury for the title role, even though she had won the Tony for her performance of the role on Broadway. Lucille Ball won the part.

Bette Davis wanted to portray Vera Charles with Lansbury in the lead, however, Bea Arthur reprised her Tony award-winning role.

=== Screenplay ===
In 1970, it was announced that Leonard Gershe would write the screenplay, however, Paul Zindel ended up writing it.

=== Filming ===
Production had been scheduled to begin in early 1972 but was postponed until January, 1973 after Ball broke her leg in a skiing accident. Owing to the delay, George Cukor, the original director, was forced to withdraw from the project. The assignment then went to Gene Saks, who had helmed the Broadway production.

Shortly after shooting began, Ball, who had casting approval, became dissatisfied with Madeline Kahn's interpretation of Gooch and had her replaced by Jane Connell, a member of the original Broadway cast.

Radie Harris of The Hollywood Reporter reported that Arthur had left the film abruptly from "conceptional differences". When asked of Ball by Joyce Harber was her mental state improved, she responded, "How can you be fine with Radie Harris up your ass?"

=== Hair and make-up ===
Harold "Hal" King was hired as Ball's make-up artist with whom she worked back at RKO Pictures in 1937. Towards the end of shooting Mame, Ball hit King in the face and in the process breaking his jaw. King had used a liquid adhesive where Ball could not wear it all day as it would hurt her.

== Release ==
=== Theatrical ===
Mame made $6.5 million while in theatres and at Radio City Music Hall which it had selected the film to be its Easter attraction.

=== Home media ===
Mame was released on pan-and-scan VHS and pan-and-scan and letterbox laserdisc editions in the 1980s and 1990s. While these official editions have long since been out-of-print, bootleg DVDs taken from the widescreen laserdisc or widescreen TV broadcasts on American Movie Classics and Turner Classic Movies have been known to exist.

On June 19, 2007, Mame officially was released on DVD both separately and in a special DVD collection of Lucille Ball's films. The DVD includes a remastered version of the film in anamorphic widescreen with Dolby Digital 1.0 mono sound, the original theatrical trailer, and the featurette Lucy Mame.

Although Warner had intended to give the film a 5.1 stereo remastering, it was unable to do so due to several factors. The main factor was that Ball's vocals in her songs often had to be pieced together line by line in order to get a more pitch-perfect performance (this method is a lot more obvious on the soundtrack CD, where one often hears a difference in fidelity in each individual line as well as the occasional line that sounds like two Lucys singing). This and the varying conditions of the original master copies caused Warner Bros. to simply restore the original release's mono soundtrack and remaster it in Dolby Digital 1.0 mono and use it for the DVD's audio track.

== Reception ==
Mame was a U.S. box-office failure and many reviews were brutal, with Ball's performance especially lambasted. The film holds a 36% rating on Rotten Tomatoes based on 11 reviews.

=== Critical response ===
Gene Siskel of the Chicago Tribune gave the film one-and-a-half stars out of four, calling it "a total bust, devoid of joy, wit, good music, or decent dancing", adding:

Much ado has been made about the film's photographic treatment of Lucille Ball's face. Each time we see Miss Ball in closeup, it appears as though the camera lens has been smeared with Vaseline. This is no small matter. The goal of almost every film is to make you forget you are watching a movie. But the continual softening of focus each time Miss Ball's mug comes into view is at first distracting, then annoying, and, ultimately, offensive to our intelligence and to Miss Ball's strength as a performer. Someone should have told Miss Ball that her public cares not about her face, but, rather, about what's behind it. The very essence of the Mame character, as I understand it, is that she is able to stare old age in the face and make it slink away. And she does this not with makeup, but with her personality... Pulitzer Prize-winning playwright Paul Zindel ["The Effect of the Gamma Rays on the Man-in-the-Moon Marigolds"] is credited with the screenplay for Mame, and it's a mess. Editing is partially to blame. There are many awkward transitions that render character motivation absurd. Talking about Mame in terms of character motivation gives the enterprise more credit than it deserves. The film is coarse, embarrassing, and tedious in turn. That it has been billed as "wholesome family entertainment" is an insult to each of those words. Aside from Robert Preston's brief appearance as the wealthy southerner, and an amusing music hall routine that smacks of the fine burlesque comedy of the original I Love Lucy television show, Mame is a failure.

Jay Cocks of Time wrote: "The movie spans about 20 years, and seems that long in running time ... Miss Ball has been molded over the years into some sort of national monument, and she performs like one too. Her grace, her timing, her vigor have all vanished."

Time Out declared she "simply hasn't the drive and steel of a Rosalind Russell, an Angela Lansbury, or a Ginger Rogers, all of whom played the part before her," and wrote of Saks: "When he's not ogling his star in perpetual soft focus and a $300,000 fashion parade, [he] fails to get enough retakes, match his shots, or inject the essential vim."

Pauline Kael in The New Yorker wondered, "After forty years in movies and TV, did she discover in herself an unfulfilled ambition to be a flaming drag queen?"

The New Republic's Stanley Kauffmann, though he pointed out that Ball would have made a perfect Mame had she played the role "fifteen years earlier," described her as "too old, too stringy in the legs, too basso in the voice, and too creaky in the joints." Virtually every critic took notice of the heavy-handedness in photographing Ball out of focus, Rex Reed going so far as to suggest, albeit jokingly, that chicken fat was smeared over the lens. Some regarded this as evidence that those executives responsible for signing Ball, and Ball herself, knew from the outset that she was too old for her role. In her defense in regards to her lack of singing ability, Ball told one interviewer "Mame stayed up all night and drank champagne! What did you expect her to sound like? Julie Andrews?"

In his Movie Guide, critic Leonard Maltin rated the film as "BOMB" and wrote: "Hopelessly out-of-date musical...will embarrass even those who love Lucy. Calling Fred and Ethel Mertz!"

Some reviews were kinder. Vincent Canby in The New York Times, for example, expressed "great reservations" about the film and Ball's close-ups, but noted that the film is "as determined to please in its way as Mame is in hers" and that the opening credits, "which look like a Cubist collage in motion, are so good they could be a separate subject." Canby went on to praise Ball as well: "When the character of Lucy, an inspired slapstick performer, coincides with that of Auntie Mame, the Big-Town sophisticate, 'Mame' is marvelous. I think of Lucy's turning a Georgia fox hunt into a gigantic shambles, or of her bringing the curtain down on a New Haven first-night when, as a budding actress, she falls off a huge cardboard moon. I even treasure her prying loose the fingers of a sloshed Beatrice Arthur who won't give up her martini glass."

Variety reported in its February 27, 1974 review that Ball was "showcased, coiffed, made-up and ably guided from almost television-like slapstick to character sincerity with loving care."

Molly Haskell in The Village Voice was "pro-Ball but anti-'Mame'" and felt that Lucy, "a great comedienne...brings it off and even manages to make palatable the kind of character--relentlessly 'on' and trying desperately to be unforgettable--you'd walk a mile to avoid in real life."

In the March 18, 1974 issue of New York, Judith Crist similarly was displeased with the film but supportive of its star: "Lucille Ball is – and no 'still' about it – a first-rate entertainer, supplementing her superb comedic sense with a penetrating warmth and inner humor. She is without peer in making a hung-over stagger from bed to bathroom an exercise in regal poise, in using her slightly crooked smile to vitiate the soppiness of an overly sentimental sequence, in applying her Goldwyn Girl chorine know-how to a dash of song and dance." Milton Krims, film critic for The Saturday Evening Post, wrote in the magazine's March 1974 issue that "Mame is Lucille Ball and Lucille Ball is Mame."

Bea Arthur later called her involvement with the film a "tremendous embarrassment", and expressed regret at having participated. Although she reportedly enjoyed working with Lucille Ball, she was not reticent with her opinion that Ball was "terribly miscast".

=== Accolades ===
The Hollywood Foreign Press Association awarded Ball a Golden Globe nomination (Arthur received one as well) but, disheartened by the film's reception, she swore she never would appear on the big screen again, and Mame proved to be her last theatrical film.

== See also ==
- List of American films of 1974
