= First Monday in October (film) =

1981 American film based on the play of the same name directed by Ronald Neame

- Theatrical release poster
- Directed by: Ronald Neame
- Screenplay by: Jerome Lawrence; Robert Edwin Lee
- Based on: First Monday in October by Jerome Lawrence and Robert Edwin Lee
- Produced by: Paul M. Heller; Martha Scott
- Starring: Walter Matthau; Jill Clayburgh; Barnard Hughes; Jan Sterling; James Stephens
- Music by: Ian Fraser
- Distributed by: Paramount Pictures
- Release date: August 21, 1981
- Running time: 99 minutes
- Country: United States
- Language: English
- Budget: $4 million
- Box office: $12.5 million

First Monday in October is a 1981 American comedy drama film from Paramount Pictures, produced by Paul M. Heller and Martha Scott, directed by Ronald Neame, that is based on the 1978 play by Jerome Lawrence and Robert Edwin Lee. The film stars Walter Matthau (for which he was nominated for a Golden Globe Award for Best Actor – Motion Picture Musical or Comedy) and Jill Clayburgh (for which she was nominated for a Golden Globe Award for Best Actress – Motion Picture Musical or Comedy). The cast also co-stars Jan Sterling in her final feature film role.

Paramount Pictures originally scheduled First Monday in October for release in February 1982, but President Ronald Reagan's nomination of Sandra Day O'Connor as the first female Supreme Court justice on July 7, 1981, forced the film's release a month after her nomination, in August 1981. The film's title refers to the day that the Supreme Court commences its annual term, which continues until June or early July of the following year.

== Plot ==
The death of Stanley Moorehead, Associate Justice of the United States Supreme Court, has created a vacancy on the high court. The President's appointee turns out to be Ruth Loomis, a staunch conservative from Orange County, California, who is confirmed as the first female Associate Justice.

She and Associate Justice Daniel Snow, a committed liberal who is many years older than Loomis and with many years on the Supreme Court, clash intellectually on just about every judicial issue that is before them. One case involves a pornographic film and involves arguments about freedom of speech.

Another is a lawsuit sent up from the lower court, brought by a company's stockholders, regarding the suppression of a possibly revolutionary new power source, a momentum engine. The patent is controlled by the board of directors of Omnitech International, and its CEO Donald Richards, who has not been seen in public for a decade and is unavailable by subpoena.

Over time, the two judges begin to like and respect each other. While he and Loomis are debating the complexities of the momentum engine and the Omnitech case after hours in the empty courthouse, Snow suffers a possible "heart episode" and goes to the hospital. Loomis, greatly worried, visits him while he recovers.

Based on something that Snow intimated during their debate, Loomis returns to California overnight. There, in a records storage center, she discovers proof that her late husband and his law firm covered up the death of their client, Donald Richards. Because of her former association with the law firm, she concludes that she has a serious conflict of interest on the Omnitech case, and must now resign her Associate Justice position. When Snow hears this, he leaves the hospital abruptly and after more debate, he talks her out of resigning. They travel by taxi to the Supreme Court to announce her discovery and attend the next conference, one that will no doubt excite the Omnitech case and get it on the docket for the high court to review.

== Cast ==
- Walter Matthau as Associate Justice Daniel Snow
- Jill Clayburgh as Associate Justice Ruth Loomis
- Barnard Hughes as Chief Justice James Jefferson Crawford
- Jan Sterling as Christine Snow
- James Stephens as Mason Woods
- Joshua Bryant as Bill Russell
- Wiley Harker as Associate Justice Harold Webb
- F.J. O'Neil as Associate Justice Waldo Thompson
- Charles Lampkin as Associate Justice Josiah Clewes
- Lew Palter as Associate Justice Benjamin Halperin
- Richard McMurray as Associate Justice Richard Carey
- Herb Vigran as Associate Justice Ambrose Quincy
- Noble Willingham as Nebraska Senator
- Olive Dunbar as Ms. Radabaugh

== Reception ==
The New York Times critic Janet Maslin opened her review of the film with two questions: "What if the latest Supreme Court Justice were a woman? And what if that woman were a terrible pill?", concisely summarizing her problems with the film, which she felt that clearly showed signs of having been rushed to market. She praised Matthau's performance and found fault with the character of Justice Ruth Loomis but pointed to the screenplay as "the main source of difficulty. The authors' idea is to confront a crotchety liberal Justice, Dan Snow, with the sprightly, more conservative Ruth Loomis, and let the sparks fly. However, Mr. Lawrence and Mr. Lee have a way of mistaking hectoring, nagging and all-out nastiness for the stuff of which sparks are made."

Director Ronald Neame came under fire for a variety of errors, including a scene set in August with snow and slush and the discordant casting of The Paper Chase star James Stephens in a role very similar to his character in the television series.

Gene Siskel of the Chicago Tribune believed that Matthau and Clayburgh were miscast and said that the film "says little about the law, and [...] even less about the high court. Unless you care that there may be spittoons under each justice's desk."

Bruce Blackader of The Toronto Star believed that its box office could benefit from the timing, much like that of The China Syndrome, but said that "there's nothing truly memorable about First Monday In October (the title refers to the day when the court opens its sessions); it's only serviceably directed by Ronald Neame; and the ending is curiously weak and anti-climactic."

Joe Pollock of the St. Louis Post-Dispatch wrote that "the comedy is light and entertaining, though it falls short of greatness for a number of reasons. Basically, Clayburgh is too young, Walter Matthau is too much of a comic and the plot line is too pat, too easy.- Even with those shortcoming, however, the film works pretty well and provides a good number of laugh lines."

Robert C. Trussell of The Kansas City Star called it "a hit-and-miss film that hangs its uneven mix of political commentary, romance, comedy and drama on the timely premise of the first appointment of a woman to the US Supreme Court".

Michael Blowen of The Boston Globe commented that "Walter Matthau spends the entire movie looking as if he's looking for Jack Lemmon, Jill Clayburgh spends the entire movie looking as if she's looking for Burt Reynolds, and the viewer spends the entire movie looking as if he's looking for the nearest exit."

Jack Mathews of the Detroit Free Press observed:

First Monday in October was scheduled to open somewhere around the first Monday of October, but since Ronald Reagan beat Paramount Pictures to the punch by nominating Sandra Day O'Connor as the country's first female Supreme Court justice, the studio figured it had better trot out its nominee—Jill Clayburgh—as soon as possible.

The movie does not seem to benefit from the marketing decision, and certainly not from current events. Seeing Clayburgh in the role so soon after the introduction of O'Connor merely underscores the absurdity of casting a young leading lady in the role of a person who,' by all that is judicial necessity, would be well into middle age.

Even Walter Matthau, as the ascorbic, liberal Justice Dan Snow, who is at odds with conservative Justice Ruth Loomis ("Tim Mother Superior of Orange County," he calls her), looks too young for a part that was played onstage by Melvyn Douglas and then by Henry Fonda. That may be taking too seriously a movie intended as repartee comedy and not social drama, but the humor's success is dependent entirely on the believability of the dueling justices.

Edwin Howard of the Memphis Press-Scimitar criticized Matthau's performance and the script dynamics while noting that it "seems certain to split the court of public opinion".

Thomas Fox of The Commercial Appeal called the film "very lightweight stuff considering the potential of its subject".

One positive review, however, came from Nancy Scott of the San Francisco Examiner, who gave the film a full four-star rating, and said, "Here we have a case of reality catching up with art—a movie about the first woman to be appointed to the US Supreme Court. Would that the real world could be as witty, as literate and as delightful as Clayburgh and Matthau. Barring a couple of lapses of taste and intention, it's a fine, civilized comedy."

Sue Eisenhuth of The Sun-Herald also liked the film, giving it three stars, and commended that "the witty script" and Matthau and Clayburgh had chemistry.

== Home media ==
First Monday in October was first released on DVD by Paramount Home Video on July 6, 2004.

== See also ==
- Supreme Court of the United States in fiction
