= First Monday in October =

Play by Jerome Lawrence and Robert E. Lee

Original Broadway poster

First Monday in October is a 1978 play by Jerome Lawrence and Robert E. Lee. The title refers to the day on which the United States Supreme Court traditionally convenes following its summer recess.

== Productions ==
The play premiered on Broadway at the Majestic Theatre on October 3, 1978. It transferred to the ANTA Playhouse on November 14, 1978, where it closed on December 9, for a total of 79 performances. Directed by Edwin Sherin, the cast starred Jane Alexander (as Judge Ruth Loomis) and Henry Fonda (as Associate Justice Daniel Snow), with Larry Gates (as Chief Justice James Jefferson Crawford). Alexander was nominated for the 1979 Tony Award for Best Actress in a Play. The play had a pre-Broadway engagement at the Kennedy Center, starting in December 1977.

The play originally was staged at the Cleveland Play House in 1975 and starred Jean Arthur and Melvyn Douglas in the lead roles. It opened Oct. 17 to poor reviews. After 11 performances, Arthur, suffering from a viral infection, checked herself into the Cleveland Clinic. She dropped out of the show, and the theater, forever.

There was a production at the Huntington Hartford Theatre in Los Angeles in March 1979, starring Henry Fonda and Eva Marie Saint.

The play was produced by the Odyssey Theatre Ensemble, Los Angeles, California, in April to June 2006. The cast featured Ralph Waite (Associate Justice Daniel Snow) and Laurie O'Brien (Justice Ruth Loomis).

== Roles ==
Role	Cast, December 28, 1977 Washington, DC, Kennedy Center
Custodians	John Stewart, P.J. Sidney
Chief Justice James Jefferson Crawford	Larry Gates
Associate Justice Josiah Clewes	Earl Sydnor
Associate Justice Waldo Thompson	Maurice Copeland
Associate Justice Daniel Snow	Henry Fonda
Associate Justice Harold Webb	John Wardwell
Marshal	John Newton
Judge Ruth Loomis	Jane Alexander
Mason Woods	Tom Stechschulte
Associate Justice Ambrose Quincy	Alexander Reed
Associate Justice Richard Carey	Eugene Stuckmann
Associate Justice Christopher Halloran	Patrick McCullough
Photographer	John Stewart
Blake	Ron Faber

== Synopsis ==
The play begins after the death of Stanley Moorehead, an Associate Justice of the United States Supreme Court. The remaining justices speculate about whom the President of the United States will appoint to fill the vacancy, with jokes among the justices that the appointee may be a black man, or a woman. While playing tennis, Ruth Loomis, a staunch conservative judge from the United States Court of Appeals for the Ninth Circuit in California, learns that she is to be the nominee. Associate Justice Daniel Snow is appalled to learn this, as her conservative views are strongly in conflict with his own liberal thinking.

Loomis testifies before the United States Senate, and is questioned about the business ties of her late husband. The Senate confirms her, and she is the first woman appointed to the US Supreme Court. On the court, Loomis and Snow immediately clash on their opposing legal and philosophical viewpoints, on such matters as freedom of speech and individual rights vs. the rights of society as a whole. One case concerns a fictional pornographic film, The Naked Nymphomaniac.

Although Snow and Loomis never concur on any of the issues before the Court, they learn to develop a respect and affection for one another with the passing of time.

== Awards and recognition ==
- 1979 Selection, The Burns Mantle Theater Yearbook, The Best Plays of 1978-1979

== See also ==
- First Monday in October (film) – a 1981 film based on the play
