= Frankie and Johnny (1966 film) =

1966 film by Frederick de Cordova

- Theatrical release poster
- Directed by: Frederick de Cordova
- Screenplay by: Alex Gottlieb
- Story by: Nat Perrin
- Produced by: Edward Small
- Starring: Elvis Presley; Donna Douglas; Harry Morgan; Sue Ane Langdon; Nancy Kovack; Audrey Christie; Robert Strauss; Anthony Eisley
- Cinematography: Jacques R. Marquette
- Edited by: Grant Whytock
- Music by: Fred Karger
- Production companies: Frankie and Johnny Productions
- Distributed by: United Artists
- Release date: March 31, 1966 (USA)
- Running time: 87 minutes
- Country: United States
- Language: English
- Budget: $4,500,000
- Box office: $2,750,000 (est. US/ Canada rentals)

Frankie and Johnny is a 1966 American Western musical film starring Elvis Presley as a riverboat gambler. The role of "Frankie" was played by Donna Douglas from The Beverly Hillbillies TV series. The film reached No. 40 on the Variety weekly national box office list for 1966. The budget of the film was estimated at $4.5 million. The director was Frederick De Cordova, who in 1970 went on to become the director and producer of The Tonight Show Starring Johnny Carson.

== Plot ==
Sometime in the 1890s, Johnny and girlfriend Frankie are performers on a Mississippi River riverboat, which also has a casino. Johnny is a compulsive gambler who is down on his luck and in debt. Johnny and his friend Cully, a musician and composer, visit a gypsy camp to get his fortune told. A lady reads tea leaves and tells Johnny that he will soon meet a red-haired woman who will bring him luck.

Back on the boat, Johnny and Cully promptly encounter Nellie Bly -- not the famed journalist, but their boss Clint Braden's on-again, off-again girlfriend. Nellie has just caught Braden seducing another singer, Mitzi. Since she has red hair, Nellie is persuaded by Johnny to touch his chips for luck. After he wins, Johnny is convinced that the gypsy must be correct. Frankie finds out and becomes jealous, as does Johnny's boss.

In a bit of musical theater, Frankie shoots Johnny for dancing with Nellie Bly while singing Cully's latest song. A Broadway recruiter sees the riverboat show and buys the rights to this new song, suggesting that Frankie and Johnny should work together with him in New York City. Landing in New Orleans, the musical cast and riverboat crew attend a masked ball. Frankie, Nellie and Mitzi all rent the same Madame Pompadour costume.

Johnny is eager for the luck of redhead Nellie to win more money, contrary to Frankie's expressed wishes. Being masked and in costume, Frankie and Nellie scheme to switch places to test Johnny's lucky-redhead theory. Johnny wins $10,000 at roulette, but when he kisses the woman he believes to be Nellie, he discovers the switch. Frankie is furious and throws all the winnings out of a window, into the street.

Blackie, a dim-witted stooge who works for the boss, hears Braden drunkenly complain about how he has lost Nellie. Thinking he can be of help, Blackie switches the blank cartridge in Frankie's stage gun for a real bullet.

The boss tries to prevent the impending disaster, but arrives on stage too late and Johnny is shot for real. Frankie forgives his gambling as the love of her life appears to be dying, but he stands up, apparently unhurt. Johnny was saved because the bullet struck a lucky medallion he was wearing that Frankie had given him.

== Cast ==
- Elvis Presley as Johnny
- Donna Douglas as Frankie
- Harry Morgan as Cully
- Sue Ane Langdon as Mitzi
- Nancy Kovack as Nellie Bly
- Audrey Christie as Peg
- Anthony Eisley as Clint Braden
- Robert Strauss as Blackie
- Joyce Jameson as Abigail
- Naomi Stevens as Princess Zolita (uncredited)
- Dave Willock as the bartender (uncredited)

== Production ==
Filming started in May 1965 and took place in Hollywood and New Orleans. Under his contract with United Artists, Presley was paid $700,000 plus 50% of the profits.

== Reception ==
Howard Thompson of The New York Times reported that the film opened with a "dull thud" and "sheds feathers almost from the start" stating that Presley's formula never before "seemed so feeble and so obvious."

Variety wrote that the film "hits the mark as pleasant entertainment, and is certain to be another Presley money-winner."

Kevin Thomas of the Los Angeles Times felt that despite "generally mediocre production values" particularly lacking in good dance numbers, the film was "fast-moving fun" and a good vehicle for Presley.

The Monthly Film Bulletin wrote: "After a long series of lifeless flops, Elvis Presley is here right back on form; or at least the film round him is (Elvis himself rarely changes) ... Although the story tends to sag a little during the romantic complications, the script is pleasantly witty, with Henry Morgan and the enchanting Nancy Kovack outstanding."
