= The Night Thoreau Spent in Jail =

American play by Robert E. Lee and Jerome Lawrence written in 1969

The Night Thoreau Spent in Jail is a two-act American play by Robert E. Lee and Jerome Lawrence, written in 1969. The play is based on the early life of the title character, Henry David Thoreau, leading up to the night he spent in jail in Concord, Massachusetts. Thoreau was jailed because he had refused to pay a poll tax that might be used to pay for the Mexican–American War, which he opposed.

Writing in The New York Times, reviewer Howard Taubman described the ideological relevance of the play to contemporary audiences, stating "this play and its protagonist, though they are of the 19th century, are speaking to today's concerns: an unwanted war in another land, civil disobedience, the interdependence of man and nature, education, the role of government and the governed."

The play includes a scene depicting an apocryphal exchange between Thoreau and his good friend Ralph Waldo Emerson, who has come to vist him in jail. Emerson says "Henry! What are you doing in jail?", to which Thoreau responds, "Waldo! What are you doing out of jail?"

== Plot ==
The play does not present events in chronological order; rather, the play features Thoreau remembering earlier parts of his life, not necessarily in the order they occurred. The play opens with Ralph Waldo Emerson, in his old age, recalling the memories of his friend, Henry. The play quickly shifts to Henry's current time in jail because he refused to pay the tax to support the war, where he meets Bailey, a homeless man falsely accused of arson. After meeting Bailey, Thoreau reflects on his recent past. Henry teaches Bailey to spell his name.

Henry, who would have graduated from Harvard, but refused to pay the one dollar fee to receive his diploma, becomes a schoolmaster and attempts to teach a class against the school's curriculum, but Deacon Ball—a logical, respected teacher—makes him flog the children, after which he quits. After leaving the school, Henry and John (Henry's brother) start an outdoor school, but soon all of the children are pulled out of classes by concerned parents. Ellen, the sibling of one of the former classmates, went to the school to find out more about Transcendentalism, which her father claimed the school was based on. After the school is disbanded and the children leave, Henry takes her on a boat ride. He tells her about Transcendentalism, and about how he loves her, but it becomes very awkward and he tells her to go to church with John. John is in love with Ellen, and proposes to her, but later Ellen tells him that her father wouldn't allow her to marry either of the Thoreau brothers.

Soon after, John dies from blood poisoning caused by a shaving cut, and Henry tries to cope with the loss.

== Characters ==
Henry David Thoreau
Henry is the main person of the play. The play is based on his early life. He is a somewhat radical Transcendentalist and refuses to pay the poll tax, due to his opposition to the Mexican–American War and slavery. His unorthodox beliefs are not very well accepted by the city of Concord.

Ralph Waldo Emerson
Emerson (referred to in the script as Waldo) appears, for most of the play, middle-aged. At this time, Emerson has already become famous and is a very recognizable feature. He and Henry become good friends, despite a few differences of opinion.

Lydian Emerson
Lydian is the wife of Waldo. There is some attraction between her and Henry, but nothing results of it due to their mutual respect for her husband.

Deacon Ball
Deacon Ball is a respected and stern teacher, who believes strongly in corporal punishment and believes Thoreau should do so, which Thoreau refuses.

John Thoreau
John is Henry's older brother, who shares many of the beliefs of Henry. He falls in love with Ellen, but then dies from blood poisoning soon after Ellen admits she does not love him.

Ellen Sewell
Ellen is the brief object of affection of both John and Henry, but is unable to marry John because of her father's disapproval of Transcendentalism.

Bailey
Thoreau's cellmate when he is locked up in the Concord jail. Thoreau teaches Bailey how to write his name and inspires Bailey to live a full life after he is released from prison.

Edward Emerson
Ralph Waldo Emerson's son, who becomes friends with Thoreau when the Emersons hire Thoreau as a handyman.

Mother Thoreau
Thoreau's mother, who has to deal with Thoreau and his backward-thinking mind. Throughout the novel, she is displeased with Thoreau's insistence on nonconformity.

Sam Staples
A man who works for the government in Corcord. Is the man who takes Thoreau to prison, but offers to pay his taxes for him.

Henry Williams
Williams is a runaway slave on his way to Canada. He is killed in his effort to make it to the border. His death has a profound effect on Thoreau, indicating the underlying motivations behind Thoreau's civil disobedience.

== Production history ==
The play was first produced at the Ohio State University, opening on April 21, 1969, and directed by Dr. Roy Bowen. It received its professional debut at the Arena Stage in Washington, D.C., on October 23, 1970. The play gained widespread popularity when it was written, with over 75 productions in its first year. It was the fourth most frequently-produced full-length play in the a survey of college productions in the 1970–1971 season, with 243 performances in 36 productions. It retained its prominence in the following season, ranking fifth in the same survey, with 158 performances in 27 productions. The play was retired for about 10 or 15 years after its final production was performed at Bradley University in 1971. Hal B. Wallis optioned the film rights, for which Lawrence and Lee wrote a screenplay, but the movie was never made.
