= Shangri-La (musical) =

- Poster for 1956 Broadway production
- Music: Harry Warren
- Lyrics: James Hilton; Jerome Lawrence; Robert E. Lee
- Book: James Hilton; Jerome Lawrence; Robert E. Lee
- Basis: Hilton's novel Lost Horizon
- Productions: 1956 Broadway; 1960 US television

Shangri-La is a musical with a book and lyrics by James Hilton, Jerome Lawrence, and Robert E. Lee and music by Harry Warren.

== Plot ==
Based on Hilton's classic 1933 novel Lost Horizon, it focuses on Hugh Conway, a veteran member of the British diplomatic service, who stumbles across a utopian lamasery high in the Himalayas in Tibet after surviving a plane crash in the mountainous terrain. When the dying High Lama asks him to take charge after his death, Conway must decide between embracing the inner peace, love, and sense of purpose he has discovered in this mysterious world or attempt to return to civilization as he knows it.

== Original production ==
After a try-out in Boston, the show opened in Philadelphia for a try-out at the Forrest Theatre starting Wednesday, May 23, 1956, for two and a half weeks. The Broadway production, directed by Albert Marre and choreographed by Donald Saddler, opened on June 13, 1956 at the Winter Garden Theatre, where it ran for only twenty-one performances. The cast included Dennis King, Shirley Yamaguchi, Martyn Green, Jack Cassidy, Alice Ghostley, Carol Lawrence, Berry Kroeger, Harold Lang, and Robert Cohan.

Irene Sharaff was nominated for the Tony Award for Best Costume Design.

An audiotape of the show was recorded live during a performance, but an original cast album never was released. The show was mounted for a 1960 television production as part of the Hallmark Hall of Fame, with several new songs, starring Richard Basehart, Marisa Pavan, Claude Rains, Gene Nelson, Helen Gallagher, and Ghostley reprising her Broadway role.

== Songs ==
Act I

- Om Mani Padme Hum
- Lost Horizon
- The Man I Never Met
- Every Time You Danced with Me
- The World Outside
- I'm Just a Little Bit Confused
- The Beetle Race
- Somewhere

Act II

- What Every Old Girl Should Know
- Second Time in Love
- Talkin' with Your Feet
- Walk Sweet
- Love Is What I Never Knew
- We've Decided to Stay
- Shangri-La
