= Onna White =

Canadian choreographer and dancer (1922–2005)

- Born: March 24, 1922; Inverness, Nova Scotia, Canada
- Died: April 8, 2005 (aged 83); West Hollywood, California, U.S.
- Occupations: Choreographer and dancer
- Spouse: Larry Douglas (m. 1948; div. 1959)
- Children: 2

Onna White (March 24, 1922 – April 8, 2005) was a Canadian choreographer and dancer whose work spanned Broadway and film. She received eight Tony Award nominations and an Academy Honorary Award for her choreography of Oliver!.

== Early life and career ==
White was born in Inverness, Nova Scotia, and grew up in a musical family. She began taking dance lessons at the age of twelve. At sixteen, she joined the San Francisco Opera Ballet, where she remained for seven years and became a principal dancer.

In 1947, White moved to New York and joined the original Broadway production of Finian's Rainbow as a replacement dancer. She served as dance captain for Hold It! (1948) and later performed in Guys and Dolls and Silk Stockings. Her work on Finian's Rainbow began an association with choreographer Michael Kidd. While dancing in productions choreographed by Kidd, she began assisting him, and he encouraged her to work independently as a choreographer.

White choreographed the 1955 Broadway revivals of Guys and Dolls and Finian's Rainbow, followed by the 1956 Off-Broadway production of Carmen Jones. Her first original Broadway production as choreographer was The Music Man (1957), which earned her the first of eight Tony Award nominations. Her later Broadway credits included Take Me Along (1959), Irma La Douce (1960), Half a Sixpence (1965), Mame (1966), 1776 (1969) and I Love My Wife (1977).

White also choreographed the film adaptations of The Music Man, 1776 and Mame, as well as Bye Bye Birdie, Oliver!, The Great Waltz and Pete's Dragon.

== Choreographic approach ==
White's choreography was closely tied to character, story and the abilities of individual performers. In a 1991 profile, the Los Angeles Times described her as a meticulous planner known for both large-scale dance sequences and work tailored to the needs of particular characters and dramatic situations. Actress Bea Arthur, who worked with White on Mame, said that White's choreography continued the dramatic action rather than interrupting it for a musical number.

White also emphasized adapting movement to performers rather than imposing a fixed style. In a 2003 interview for American Masters, she described listening closely to a show's score and allowing its rhythms to influence the choreography, while using ballet training as a technical foundation. She frequently worked with performers who did not consider themselves dancers; recalling 1776, White described finding movement that its largely non-dancing cast could perform comfortably.

== Personal life ==
White married actor Larry Douglas in 1948. They had two children, Jeanne and Stuart, before divorcing in 1959.

White died at her home in West Hollywood, California, on April 8, 2005, at the age of 83.

== Awards ==
The Academy of Motion Picture Arts and Sciences voted White an Academy Honorary Award for Oliver! (1968), one of the rare occasions that the Academy recognized choreography in film. Other recipients include Gene Kelly for "career achievements", Jerome Robbins for "choreographic achievement on film", Michael Kidd (White's mentor) for "services to the art of dance in the art of the screen" and Stanley Donen for "body of work". Fred Astaire's was much earlier, and was for his body of work.

Contemporary reviews also highlighted the film's musical staging. Variety credited White's dance ensembles as an important part of the production.

The Academy's citation for White's Honorary Award read: "To Onna White for her outstanding choreography achievement for Oliver!."

== Theater credits ==
- 1947 Finian's Rainbow (performer)
- 1949 Regina (performer)
- 1950 Guys and Dolls (performer)
- 1950 Arms and the Girl (performer)
- 1955 Silk Stockings (performer)
- 1956 Carmen Jones (choreography)
- 1957 The Music Man (choreography)
- 1958 Whoop-Up (choreography)
- 1959 Take Me Along (choreography)
- 1960 Irma La Douce (choreography)
- 1961 Let It Ride (choreography)
- 1964 I Had a Ball (choreography)
- 1965 Half a Sixpence (choreography)
- 1966 Mame (choreography)
- 1967 Illya Darling (choreography)
- 1969 1776 (musical staging)
- 1970 Gantry (direction and choreography)
- 1971 70, Girls, 70 (choreography)
- 1974 Gigi (choreography)
- 1974 Billy (choreography)
- 1975 Goodtime Charley (choreography)
- 1977 I Love My Wife (musical staging)
- 1978 Working (dance and musical staging)

== Choreographed films ==
- The Music Man (1962)
- Bye Bye Birdie (1963)
- Oliver! (1968)
- 1776 (1972)
- The Great Waltz (1972)
- Mame (1974)
- Pete's Dragon (1977)

== Tony Award nominations ==
- 1958 Best Choreography for The Music Man
- 1959 Best Choreography for Whoop-Up
- 1960 Best Choreography for Take Me Along
- 1961 Best Choreography for Irma La Douce
- 1965 Best Choreography for Half a Sixpence
- 1966 Best Choreography for Mame
- 1968 Best Choreography for Illya Darling
- 1977 Best Choreography for I Love My Wife
