= Wiley Harker =

American character actor

- Born: James Harker; January 27, 1915; Horton, Kansas, U.S.
- Died: May 1, 2007 (aged 92); Eugene, Oregon, U.S.
- Occupation: Character actor

James Harker (January 27, 1915 – May 1, 2007) was an American character actor who portrayed Crane Tolliver in the soap opera General Hospital in 1983. He also played Justice Harold Webb in First Monday in October (1981). He also appeared in Things to Do in Denver When You're Dead as Boris Carlotti, and The Straight Story as World War II veteran Verlyn Heller.

Harker served in the United States Navy during World War II. He died on May 1, 2007, at the age of 92.

== Filmography ==
| Year | Title | Role | Notes |
|---|---|---|---|
| 1976 | Held for Ransom | | |
| 1981 | Hart to Hart | Mr. Janis | |
| 1981 | First Monday in October | Justice Harold Webb | |
| 1982 | Lookin' to Get Out | Dr. Green - Hotel Doctor | |
| 1984 | Trancers | Dapper Old Man | |
| 1984 | City Heat | Mr. Smith | |
| 1984 | Micki & Maude | Oliver Cushing III | |
| 1985 | Crimewave | Governor | |
| 1995 | Things to Do in Denver When You're Dead | Boris Carlotti | |
| 1999 | The Straight Story | Verlyn Heller | |
| 2001 | Sugar & Spice | Principal Smith | |
| 2001 | Herman U. S. A. | Bill | |
