= Inherit the Wind (play) =

American play about the Scopes trial

- Written by: Jerome Lawrence; Robert Edwin Lee
- Characters: Henry Drummond, Matthew Harrison Brady, E.K. Hornbeck, Bertram Cates, Rachel Brown, Rev. Jeremiah Brown
- Setting: Hillsboro, United States

Premiere
- Date: 1955
- Place: United States

Inherit the Wind is an American play by Jerome Lawrence and Robert Edwin Lee, which debuted in Dallas under the direction of Margo Jones in 1955. The story fictionalizes the 1925 Scopes trial as a means to discuss the then-contemporary McCarthy trials.

== Background ==
Inherit the Wind is a fictionalized account of the 1925 Scopes Monkey Trial, which resulted in John T. Scopes' conviction for teaching Charles Darwin's theory of evolution to a high school science class, contrary to a Tennessee state law. The role of Matthew Harrison Brady is intended to portray famed orator and politician William Jennings Bryan, while that of Henry Drummond resembles noted defense attorney Clarence Darrow. Bryan and Darrow, formerly close friends, opposed one another at the trial. The character of Bertram Cates corresponds to John Scopes, and the character of E.K. Hornbeck is modeled on that of H. L. Mencken, who covered the trial for The Baltimore Sun and whose sensational reports helped attract national attention.

However, the playwrights state in a note at the opening of the play that it is not meant to be a historical account, and there are numerous instances where events were substantially altered or invented. For instance, the characters of the preacher and his daughter were fictional, the townspeople were not hostile towards those who had come to Dayton for the trial, and Bryan offered to pay Scopes' fine if he was convicted. Bryan did die shortly after the trial, but this occurred five days later, in his sleep.

Political commentator Steve Benen has said of the play's inaccuracies: "Scopes issued no plea for empathy, there was no fiancee and the real Scopes was never arrested. In fact, the popular film that was nominated for four Academy Awards and has helped shape the American understanding of the 'Scopes Monkey Trial' for decades is an inadequate reflection of history."

Playwright Lawrence explained in a 1996 interview that the drama's purpose was to criticize the then-current reign of McCarthyism and defend intellectual freedom. According to Lawrence, "we used the teaching of evolution as a parable, a metaphor for any kind of mind control [...]. It's not about science versus religion. It's about the right to think."

== Title ==
The play's title comes from Proverbs 11:29, which in the King James Bible reads:

He that troubleth his own house shall inherit the wind: and the fool shall be servant to the wise of heart.

In Act Two, Scene One, Brady admonishes Reverend Brown with this Bible quote for alienating his daughter when he gives a fiery sermon against Cates.

== Cast of characters ==
- Matthew Harrison Brady, a three-time presidential candidate and nationally known attorney with strong Fundamentalist beliefs. He is a Populist and still a dynamic public speaker, even though he is in his mid-60s and struggling with poor health.
- Henry Drummond, a famous liberal crusader and lawyer who was once Brady's closest friend and political confidant. He is about the same age as Brady.
- Bertram "Bert" Cates, an idealistic Hillsboro high school teacher in his 20s arrested for defying a state ban on the teaching of Darwinian evolution.
- E.K. Hornbeck, a reporter for the fictional Baltimore Herald newspaper. He is eager to publicize the trial for profit, and is portrayed as cynical, opportunistic, and filled with contempt for religion and the people of Hillsboro.
- Reverend Jeremiah Brown, a widowed fundamentalist Protestant Christian preacher of unknown denomination who believes in Biblical literalism. He leads public support in Hillsboro for Cates' prosecution.
- Rachel Brown, the Rev. Brown's daughter. She is 22 and the romantic interest of Cates. Her loyalties are torn between her father and Cates, and she is easily manipulated by others.
- The Judge, who oversees the trial and shows hints of bias in favor of Brady's case.
- Howard Blair, a 13-year-old high school student who was in Bertram Cates' class and testifies in his case.
- Melinda Loomis, a 12-year-old girl who believes strongly in the Bible.
- Tom Davenport, the local district attorney who prosecutes Bertram Cates to fuel his political ambitions.
- The Mayor, the top elected official of Hillsboro who is openly supportive of the Rev. Brown but also seeks to use the trial as a means of drawing national attention to his economically declining town.

There are also a number of minor speaking roles. These include Meeker, a bailiff at the Hillsboro courthouse; Mrs. Sarah Brady, Matthew Harrison Brady's wife; Mrs. Krebs, a loudly outspoken supporter of Rev. Brown and leader of the Hillsboro Ladies' Aid Society; Mr. Bannister, a local citizen; Elijah, an illiterate man from the nearby woods who sells Bibles to the crowd; Harry Esterbrook, a radio reporter from Chicago; Jesse Dunlap, a local farmer; George Sillers, an employee at the feed store; and the Storekeeper, Sillers' employer.

== Summary ==
The play takes place in the small town of Hillsboro, in an unnamed state in the central part of the United States. (It is often assumed to be either Kentucky or Tennessee.) Scenes take place either in front of the county courthouse or in the courtroom. It takes place in the summertime "not too long ago".

=== Act One ===
==== Scene One ====
The play begins with local high school student Howard Blair looking for worms in front of the Hillsboro courthouse. Melinda appears, and they have a discussion about evolution and the recent arrest of their teacher, Betram Cates. They exit when Rachel enters. Rachel convinces Meeker, the bailiff, to give her some time with Cates. Bert and Rachel's conversation tells the audience about why Bert taught evolution to his students. Rachel and Bert are engaged to wed, but her father does not approve. Meeker comes in as they are hugging, saying he needs to sweep. Rachel exits. Meeker tells Bert that Matthew Harrison Brady has volunteered to prosecute him and reminisces about seeing Brady speak during one of his failed presidential campaigns. When questioned, Bert says that the Baltimore Herald has offered to pay for his attorney but doesn't know the man's name. Bert and Meeker exit.

Reverend Jeremiah Brown enters and speaks with the townspeople, Howard, and Melinda. Everyone is excited that Matthew Harrison Brady is coming to Hillsboro. When Timmy, a boy who lives in Hillsboro, sees smoke from the arriving train, everyone exits. E.K. Hornbeck, representing the Herald, delivers a soliloquy cruelly ridiculing the people of Hillsboro. Hornbeck spots a monkey someone has brought to mock Bert and feigns conversation with it. The crowd enters with Brady, Mrs. Brady, Rev. Brown, and the Mayor. Brady makes a brief speech, which the crowd wildly cheers. The Mayor honors Brady with the title of "Honorary Colonel" in the state militia and introduces him to Reverend Brown. Members of the Hillsboro Ladies' Aid Society set up a buffet lunch on the courthouse lawn as Brady discusses how he will handle Cates' legal counsel. Hornbeck then announces that the defense attorney will be Henry Drummond, a well-known liberal lawyer and Brady's former colleague. The scene ends with everyone in the town escorting the Bradys to a nearby hotel and the introduction of Drummond, who in contrast to Brady's lavish welcoming is only greeted with boos and mockery.

==== Scene Two ====
Scene Two occurs in the courtroom. Present are Matthew Harrison Brady, Henry Drummond, Tom Davenport, the Mayor, the Judge, and many townspeople (sitting behind the defense and prosecution and watching the proceedings). It is a day or two later, and jury selection is under way. Davenport questions Mr. Bannister to see if he is an acceptable juror to the prosecution. Bannister says he attends church on Sundays, and the prosecution accepts him. Drummond questions Bannister, and it is revealed that Bannister is illiterate. Drummond accepts Bannister for the jury. Jesse Dunlap is then called to the stand. Brady asks Dunlap if he believes in the Bible. Dunlap states "I believe in the Holy Word of God. And I believe in Matthew Harrison Brady!" Brady finds Dunlap acceptable; Drummond does not but refuses to explain his reasoning. Brady demands that Drummond provide a reason for refusing Dunlap or at least ask him a question. Drummond asks Dunlap how he feels, then excuses Dunlap as unacceptable.

Drummond also protests the use of the title "Colonel Matthew Harrison Brady" by the Judge. Realizing that Brady's honorary title may have prejudiced the judicial proceedings, the Mayor confers with the Judge and they agree to make Drummond a "Temporary Honorary Colonel" for the duration of proceedings.

George Sillers is brought in after Dunlap steps down. Brady briefly questions Sillers, then accepts him. Drummond asks Sillers some questions on religion and then evolution, then accepts Sillers as well. Alarmed, Brady tells the court that Sillers won't render impartial judgment. Drummond objects to Brady's use of the word "conform". Brady tells the Judge (although his comments are subtly directed at Drummond) about the "Endicott Publishing Case", a trial in which Brady claims Drummond confused the jury so much that they delivered an incorrect verdict. Drummond states that all he wants to do is stop "the clock-stoppers" from inserting religious belief into the Constitution. The Judge reminds Drummond that this is not a federal case, and that constitutional questions cannot be entertained. Drummond demands that they be included, but the Judge rules him out of order. With the jury seated, court is adjourned for the day.

After recessing the court, the Judge announces that Reverend Brown will hold a prayer meeting later that night. Drummond objects and argues that such announcements from the bench are prejudicial, but the Judge ignores him.

=== Act Two ===
==== Scene One ====
Scene One occurs in front of the courthouse later that evening. Two workmen discuss whether to take down the "Read Your Bible" banner which hangs over the entrance to the courthouse (which Drummond had asked for in court earlier) but decide against it. They leave when they hear people approaching.

At the hotel, Brady eats a large dinner while speaking to Hornbeck and some reporters from the "Reuters News Agency". He discusses his past relationship with Drummond, who worked with him on several cases and stumped for him in his presidential campaigns. Brady accuses Hornbeck of biased reporting, but Hornbeck replies that he is a critic - not a reporter.

Reverend Brown and a crowd of supporters (including Drummond and Brady) enter for the prayer meeting. Brown engages in call and response with the crowd, preaching about how God created the world in six days. Brown denounces Cates as a heretic worthy of death, and Rachel (who has entered mid-sermon) demands that he stop. Instead, Rev. Brown loudly condemns anyone who seeks forgiveness for Cates. Rachel becomes very distressed. Brady, increasingly uneasy with the tenor of Brown's sermon, interrupts him and quotes the Book of Proverbs: "He that troubleth his own house shall inherit the wind..." Brady dismisses the crowd by reminding them of Jesus Christ's command to forgive.

After the prayer meeting, Brady approaches Drummond and asks him why he is defending Cates. He accuses Drummond of having "moved away" from everything both men once believed in. Drummond replies, "All motion is relative. Perhaps it is you who have moved away by standing still."

==== Scene Two ====
Scene Two occurs in the courtroom two days after the prayer meeting. It is the afternoon, and very hot. The scene opens with the trial already under way. Brady calls Howard Blair to the stand as a witness. Brady and Drummond then exchange heated words over "speech-making" before the Judge orders them to stop. Drummond attempts to cross-examine Howard, but Brady repeatedly objects to Drummond's questions (which the Judge sustains). Drummond instead delivers a monologue in which he declares "morality is meaningless, but truth is valuable", then dismisses Howard from the stand.

Davenport then surprises everyone by calling Rachel as the next witness. Under Brady's questioning, she reveals that Cates stopped attending Rev. Brown's church after Brown preached that a local boy who had drowned was not saved because he had not been baptized. Cates angrily shouts that Brown had really preached that the boy was burning in Hell. The crowd tries to shout him down, but Cates continues until order is restored. Brady again questions Rachel, demanding to know if Cates denied the reality of God and compared marriage to the breeding of animals. Cates again interrupts her response, yelling that his statements to her were private and just questions — not statements of fact. Rachel weeps on the stand, and Drummond objects to the line of questioning. Brady ends his examination. Drummond is about to examine her, but Cates threatens to fire him, and he allows Rachel to step down.

Drummond introduces a number of prominent scientists whom he intends to call as witnesses, but each is rejected by the Judge when Davenport argues that scientific fact has no bearing on the validity of the law. Drummond asks if the Judge will permit testimony about the Bible, which is accepted. He then calls Brady to the stand as his witness. Davenport objects, but Brady boastfully asserts that Drummond can say nothing that will change the outcome of the trial.

Drummond attempts to question Brady about his knowledge of the writings of Charles Darwin, but the Judge rules that such questions are inappropriate. Drummond then asks Brady about the truthfulness behind the story of Jonah and the whale and other accounts. Brady states they are all true, and Drummond accuses him of wanting to throw all modern science out of the classroom. Davenport objects to Drummond's line of questioning, but Brady retorts that Drummond is only playing into his hands. Drummond submits that science has proven that a literal interpretation of the Bible is impossible. "God gave man the ability to reason, so why can't he use that ability to question the Bible?", Drummond asks. He also asks Brady if the ability to think is what distinguishes a man from a sponge. Confused and visibly frustrated, Brady responds that God determines who shall be a man and who shall be a sponge. Drummond declares that Cates only demands the same right as a sponge: To think. The crowd in the courtroom erupts in applause.

Drummond changes his line of questioning. He asks Brady how old the earth is, and Brady replies it is about 6,000 years old, according to Biblical research. "But if local rocks and fossils are millions of years old, how can this be?" Drummond asks. Unnerved, Brady reasserts that the world was created in six days, as the Bible says. Drummond asks Brady if it isn't possible that, since the sun was not created until the fourth day, that the first "day" of creation wasn't necessarily a normal 24-hour day, which he concedes to. Drummond declares that day could have actually been millions of years in length. Realizing that science and religion might be compatible after all, the crowd becomes vocally restive.

Realizing the trap he has fallen into, Brady accuses Drummond of trying to destroy people's faith, and states that God spoke directly to the authors of the Bible. Drummond points out that by such logic, God might have also spoken to Charles Darwin. Brady asserts that God told him that Darwin's works were not "divinely inspired". Drummond mocks Brady as a "modern apostle" and concludes that no law can be just if its interpretation relies solely on one man's "divine inspiration". Brady claims that if men have free will, then no one can dictate what the law is. Drummond seizes on his statement and demands to know why the law refuses to allow Bertram Cates to exercise his free will. Brady loses his composure and begins mindlessly quoting the Bible at length as the crowd starts to laugh at him. Drummond dismisses him from the witness stand, and Brady slumps in the witness chair while his wife rushes to his side and comforts him.

=== Act Three ===
The time is the day after the Brady/Drummond confrontation. It is early morning, and still very hot. Act Three consists of a single scene, and all the major characters are present. The courtroom is jammed with people, including several radio reporters and their bulky equipment. Cates asks Drummond if he will be found guilty. Drummond responds that when he was seven years old, he received an expensive rocking horse named "Golden Dancer" which broke the second he rode it due to shoddy craftsmanship. Drummond advises him that appearances can be deceiving, and a clear-cut guilty verdict may conceal many things. He also implicitly criticizes Brady as all show and no substance. Their discussion ends as the Mayor speaks privately with the Judge in front of the bench. Fearing that the town's image has been tarnished by Brady's antics, the Mayor asks the Judge to go easy on Cates should there be a guilty verdict.

The Judge resumes the trial, and the jury enters. Cates is given permission to speak and says only that the law is unjust. His voice is weak and unsteady, and he sits down without completing his statement. The Judge takes the verdict from the jury and pronounces Cates guilty but sentences him only to a $100 fine. Many in the crowd are angry at the verdict, but others are pleased. Brady denounces the sentence as too lenient; Drummond says that it is wrong and predicts that an appeal will overturn the verdict. Brady asks for time to address the crowd with prepared remarks, but the Judge agrees with Drummond that the case has dragged on long enough and adjourns the court.

In the chaos that ensues after the adjournment, Brady attempts to deliver his remarks anyway but struggles to be heard. The crowd begins to leave, and the reporters turn off their microphones. Brady shouts even louder, trying to get the crowd's attention. He then collapses and is carried out of the courtroom in a delirium. Hornbeck sneers at Brady and calls him a political loser. Cates asks Drummond if he won or lost, and Drummond says he won by bringing national attention to a bad law. Hornbeck says his newspaper will make sure to cover any future legal expenses for Cates.

Rachel enters and tells Cates that she moved out of her father's house, declaring that she will marry him even without his blessing. She tells Cates that she tried to read some of Darwin's book, which she shows to him, but didn't understand it. She apologizes to Drummond and admits that he was right in telling her that she should not fear her own thoughts.

The Judge enters and announces that Matthew Harrison Brady is dead. Drummond is deeply saddened while a gleeful Hornbeck criticizes Brady at length, sarcastically saying that he died of "a busted belly" and calling him a "bunko artist". Drummond defends his old friend. They argue about Brady's achievements, and Drummond questions why Hornbeck, who believes in nothing, has any right to question Brady's sincerity. Hornbeck accuses Drummond of being overly "sentimental", and leaves.

Cates and Rachel depart to catch a train; they are leaving town to be married elsewhere. Rachel leaves behind Cates's copy of Darwin's The Descent of Man. Drummond picks up both the Darwin book and Brady's personal Bible and leaves the courtroom with both books in his briefcase.

== Original production and revivals ==
Lawrence and Lee’s play was rejected by eight Broadway producers before coming to the attention of Margo Jones, a theater director and producer in Dallas, Texas. With Jones directing, Inherit the Wind premiered in Dallas on January 10, 1955, and received rave reviews. The Broadway rights were soon acquired by Herman Shumlin, and the play opened at Broadway’s National Theatre on April 21, 1955. Shumlin directed, with actors Paul Muni, Ed Begley and Tony Randall in the cast. It played on Broadway until June 22, 1957, where it closed after 806 performances.

The play was revived on Broadway twice: April 4–May 12, 1996 and April 12–July 8, 2007. The 1996 revival starred George C. Scott (who played Brady in the later 1999 TV version) as Drummond and Charles Durning as Brady. In April, Scott had to leave the show mid-performance due to ill health and was replaced by Randall (who was producing) for that day. Scott did not return, and Randall assumed the role for Wednesday matinees. The revival closed early as Scott's presence had been one of the main draws. Christopher Plummer and Brian Dennehy starred in the 2007 revival.

=== Other revivals ===
In 2006 several scenes were translated to Italian for the first time by Luca Giberti for a series of Darwin-themed readings.

Kevin Spacey (Henry Drummond) and David Troughton (Matthew Harrison Brady) starred in a 2009 revival at The Old Vic in London.

In 2018, Chandan Sen directed the play for the first time in the Bengali language, renamed as A-Pabitra which starred actor Sabyasachi Chakraborty along with Asit Basu, Tandra Basu, Shantilal Mukherjee and Sen himself.

In November 2023, a revival directed by Michael Michetti ran at the Pasadena Playhouse starring Alfred Molina (Drummond), John Douglas Thompson (Brady) and Chris Perfetti (Hornbeck).

== Screen adaptations ==
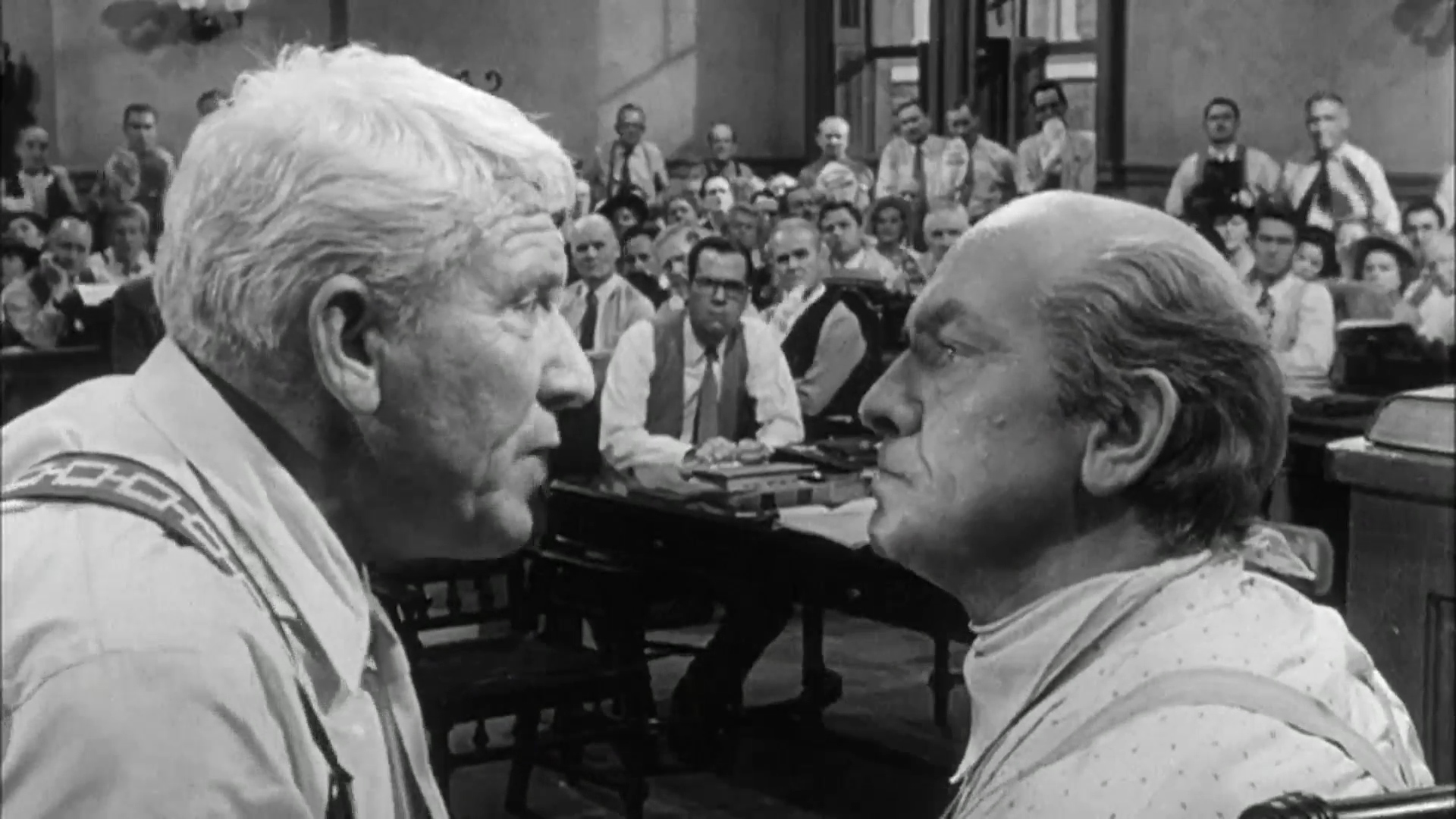
Henry Drummond (Spencer Tracy, left) and Matthew Harrison Brady (Fredric March, right) in the 1960 film version of Inherit the Wind

- Inherit the Wind (1960 film), directed by Stanley Kramer; starring Spencer Tracy, Fredric March, and Gene Kelly
- Inherit the Wind (1965 film), a television film starring Melvyn Douglas, Ed Begley and Murray Hamilton
- Inherit the Wind (1988 film), a television film starring Jason Robards, Kirk Douglas, and Darren McGavin
- Inherit the Wind (1999 film), a television film starring Jack Lemmon, George C. Scott, and Beau Bridges

== Awards and nominations ==
=== Original Broadway production ===
| Year | Award | Category | Nominee | Result |
|---|---|---|---|---|
| 1956 | Tony Award | Best Actor in a Play | Paul Muni | Won |
| 1956 | Tony Award | Best Featured Actor in a Play | Ed Begley | Won |
| 1956 | Tony Award | Best Scenic Design | Peter Larkin | Won |
| 1956 | Tony Award | Best Director | Herman Shumlin | Nominated |

=== 1996 Broadway revival ===
| Year | Award | Category | Nominee | Result |
|---|---|---|---|---|
| 1996 | Tony Award | Best Revival of a Play | | Nominated |
| 1996 | Tony Award | Best Actor in a Play | George C. Scott | Nominated |

=== 2007 Broadway revival ===
| Year | Award | Category | Nominee | Result |
|---|---|---|---|---|
| 2007 | Tony Award | Best Revival of a Play | | Nominated |
| 2007 | Tony Award | Best Actor in a Play | Christopher Plummer | Nominated |
| 2007 | Tony Award | Best Scenic Design of a Play | Santo Loquasto | Nominated |
| 2007 | Tony Award | Best Lighting Design of a Play | Brian MacDevitt | Nominated |
| 2007 | Drama Desk Award | Outstanding Actor in a Play | Christopher Plummer | Nominated |
| 2007 | Drama Desk Award | Outstanding Director of a Play | Doug Hughes | Nominated |
| 2007 | Drama Desk Award | Outstanding Music in a Play | David Van Tieghem | Nominated |

== See also ==
- List of American films of 1960
- Trial movies
