= Jabberwock (play) =

American work of dramatic biography

Jabberwock is a 1972 play by American playwrights Jerome Lawrence and Robert E. Lee, a semi-biographical account of the childhood of author/cartoonist/playwright James Thurber. It focuses on his early life and his eccentric family as they live through World War I.
