= The Incomparable Max =

- Original language: English
- Written by: Jerome Lawrence; Robert E. Lee
- Characters: Enoch Soames; A.V. Laider; Max Beerbohm; Mrs. Elbourne; Mrs. Blake
- Subject: Based on two short stories by Max Beerbohm

Premiere
- Date: 1969
- Place: Barter Theatre; Abingdon, Virginia

The Incomparable Max is a play by Jerome Lawrence and Robert E. Lee. It is based on the stories "Enoch Soames" and "A.V. Laider" in Seven Men by Max Beerbohm.

Enoch Soames is a minor poet who makes a pact with the devil to spend a few hours in the library of the British Museum one hundred years in the future to learn how history will regard him. There he finds the only mention of his name is in a short story written by Max Beerbohm. A.V. Laider is a palmist who foretells the death of four people riding on a train - or does he?

The play had its premiere at the Barter Theatre in Abingdon, Virginia in 1969. The Broadway production, directed by Gerald Freedman, began the first of ten previews on October 9, 1971 at the Royale Theatre. It opened on October 19 and closed on November 6 after 23 performances.

The cast included Richard Kiley in the dual roles of Soames and Laider and Clive Revill as Beerbohm. Constance Carpenter and Fionnula Flanagan appeared in supporting roles.

The creative team included costume designer Theoni V. Aldredge and lighting designer Martin Aronstein.

T.E. Kalem of Time observed, "The work is a glue job rather than an organic entity. The authors . . . awkwardly mixed Beerbohm in as a character among his own creations. In passages that are almost unrelated asides, they have Max as drama critic quoting himself on plays, players and playgoers. These comments lack the pithy bite of aphorisms, and as out-of-context fragments, they lose much of the slyly inflected wit that is one of the special pleasures of reading Beerbohm . . . The deeper problem lies with Max himself, who was too much the fastidious dandy, too much the meticulous stylist, to serve as a vehicle for the broad, boisterous traffic of the stage."
