= Frankie Michaels =

- Born: Francis Michael Chernesky; 5 May 1955; Bridgeport, Connecticut, U.S.
- Died: 30 March 2016 (aged 60); Chittenango, New York, U.S.
- Occupation: Actor & Singer

Francis Michael Chernesky (5 May 1955 – 30 March 2016), known professionally as Frankie Michaels, was an American actor and singer. In 1966, he won a Tony Award for Best Featured Actor in a Musical for playing young Patrick Dennis in the original production of Mame, just a little over a month after his 11th birthday, being the youngest Tony Award winner ever.

== Stage career ==
Michaels holds the record for being the youngest person to win the Tony Award for Best Featured Actor in a Musical -- at age 10 as young Patrick Dennis in the Broadway musical Mame in 1966. His other stage credits include A for Adult and Happily Ever After, both off-Broadway.

== TV career ==
Michaels appeared in the TV series As the World Turns from 1964–66, Our Private World in 1965, and The Joey Bishop Show in 1967. While performing in Mame he made guest appearances on The Mike Douglas Show and The Merv Griffin Show in 1966.

== Singing career ==
In 1965, at age 10, Michaels recorded Gladys Shelley's theme song for the Little Miss America pageant at Palisades Amusement Park, for Spiral Records.

In 2010, he sang "My Best Girl," which he had sung in Mame, during a tribute to Angela Lansbury at the 2010 Drama League Gala at the Pierre Hotel in New York City.

As of 2013, Michaels worked for United Radio Service in East Syracuse, New York, and sang in a lounge at the Turning Stone Resort & Casino in Verona, New York, on Friday evenings.
