= Jane Connell =

American actress and singer (1925–2013)

- Connell in 1965
- Born: Jane Sperry Bennett; October 27, 1925; Berkeley, California, U.S.
- Died: September 22, 2013 (aged 87); Englewood, New Jersey, U.S.
- Occupations: Actress, singer
- Spouse: Gordon Connell (m. 1948)
- Children: 2

Jane Sperry Connell (pronounced con-NELL, née Bennett; October 27, 1925 – September 22, 2013) was an American actress and singer.

Connell is best known for originating the role of Agnes Gooch in the 1966 stage musical and 1974 film musical versions of Auntie Mame.

== Early years ==
Connell was born in Berkeley, California, to Louis Wesley and Mary (née Sperry) Bennett. She majored in drama at the University of California, Berkeley where she met her future husband.

== Career ==
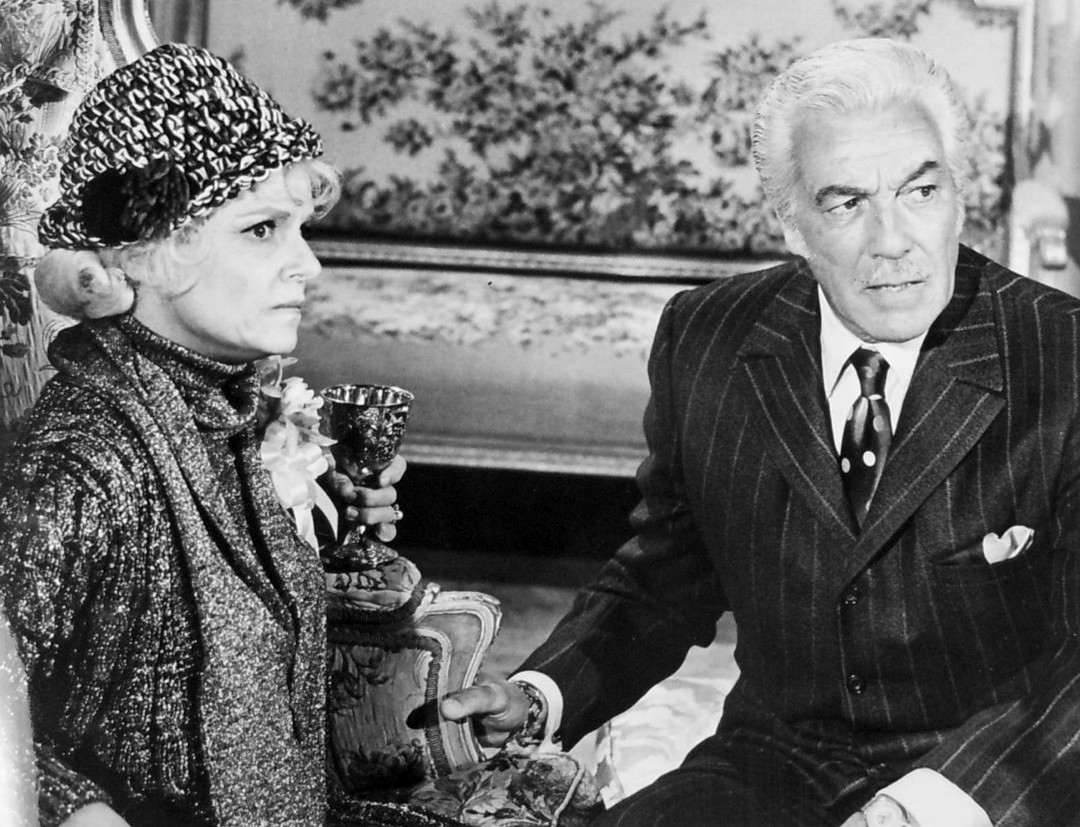
Connell as Hepzibah with Cesar Romero in Bewitched, 1970

Connell began her career with her husband Gordon, entertaining in San Francisco night clubs such as The Purple Onion and the Hungry I. Eventually the couple moved to New York City, where Connell made her Off-Broadway debut in the 1955 revival of The Threepenny Opera, a long-running hit at the Theatre de Lys. In the London production of Once Upon a Mattress, Connell starred as Winifred, the role that Carol Burnett had originated in New York. Her Broadway debut came in the role of Mrs. Peachum in Threepenny Opera (1955).

Connell's most prominent success came in 1966 when she was cast as Agnes Gooch in the original Broadway production of Jerry Herman's Mame. She recreated the role in the 1974 screen adaptation after Lucille Ball, the film's star, became dissatisfied with Madeline Kahn, who originally had been signed to play Gooch.

Only four-foot-eleven, Connell was described as a master of the large comic gesture in The Oxford Companion to American Theatre, which described her as "a tiny woman with a giant, squeaking voice".

Connell was nominated for the Tony Award for Best Featured Actress in a Musical for her performance in Me and My Girl (1986). Additional Broadway credits include New Faces of 1956 (1956); Drat! The Cat! (1965); Dear World (1969), once again supporting Angela Lansbury; the short-lived 1983 revival of Mame, in which Lansbury reprised her 1966 lead role; Lend Me a Tenor (1989); Crazy for You (1992); and Moon Over Buffalo (1995), starring Carol Burnett; The Full Monty (2000), succeeding Kathleen Freeman, who died during her run in the show, and The Adventures of Tom Sawyer (2001).

Jane and Gordon Connell enjoyed extensive theatre careers. They appeared together on Broadway in Lysistrata (November 1972), starring Melina Mercouri in the title role. She appeared in New York City Center Encores! production of Call Me Madam (February 1995), and the Weill Recital Hall of Carnegie Hall concert presentation of Noël Coward's Sail Away (November 1999).

Jane Connell's film roles included Ladybug Ladybug (1963), Trilogy (1969), Kotch (1971), Won Ton Ton, the Dog Who Saved Hollywood (1976), House Calls (1978), Rabbit Test (1978), Robot in the Family (1994) and Dr. Jekyll and Ms. Hyde (1995). Her decades of television work included six appearances on Bewitched, where she variously played Mother Goose, Martha Washington, Queen Hepzibah and, in a memorable turn as Queen Victoria, often uttered the phrase "We are not amused." She also appeared on Green Acres, All in the Family, The Mary Tyler Moore Show, Love, American Style, M*A*S*H, Maude, Good Times, Law & Order and many more.

Connell portrayed Jane in the comedy series Stanley (1956). She was a regular on the children's series Mr. Mayor (1964) and the situation comedy The Dumplings. From 1991 to 1994, she had the recurring role of social worker Roberta Domedian on the sitcom Big Brother Jake.

== Family ==
She married Gordon Connell, an actor and musician, in 1948. They remained married until her death in 2013. The couple had two daughters.

== Death ==
Jane Connell died on September 22, 2013, aged 87, at the Lillian Booth Actors Home of the Actors Fund in Englewood, New Jersey from undisclosed causes. She was survived by her husband (who died in 2016) and two daughters, Melissa and Maggie.

== Filmography ==
Year	Title	Role	Notes
1963	Ladybug Ladybug	Mrs. Maxton	
1969	Trilogy	Mrs. Connolly	
1971	Kotch	Miss Roberts	
1974	Mame	Agnes Gooch	
1976	Won Ton Ton, the Dog Who Saved Hollywood	Waitress	
1977	The Magnificent Magical Magnet of Santa Mesa	Ida Griffith	
1978	House Calls	Mrs. Conway	
1978	Rabbit Test	Anthropologist	
1980	Getting There	Grandma	
1989	See No Evil, Hear No Evil	Woman	
1994	Robot in the Family	Mrs. Miller	
1995	Dr. Jekyll and Ms. Hyde	Aunt Agatha	

=== Television ===
Year	Title	Role	Notes
1956–1957	Stanley	Jane/Mary/Ruth	9 episodes
1960–1961	Play of the Week	Baby Doll Dalls	2 episodes
1963	The Patty Duke Show	Mrs. Coglan	Episode: The Conquering Hero
1967–1972	Bewitched	Martha/Hepzibah/Mother Goose	6 episodes
1970	The Mary Tyler Moore Show	Karen Norris	Episode: Divorce Isn't Everything
1970	The Carol Burnett Show	self	Season 3, Episode 21
1971	That Girl	Laura	Episode: Chef's Night Out
1971	Green Acres	Woman/Clara Burton	3 episodes
1972	Love, American Style	Rita Baker/Sadie	2 episodes
1974–1976	ABC Afterschool Specials	Aunt Peggy/Duenna	2 episodes
1976	The Dumplings	Bridget McKenna	10 episodes
1976	Mary Hartman, Mary Hartman	Nurse	4 episodes
1976	Maude	Sally	Episode: The Game Show
1976	All's Fair	Mother	Episode: Happy Anniversary: Part 1
1977	All In The Family	Sybil Gooley	Episode: Edith's 50th Birthday: Part 1
1978	Good Times	Mrs. Flicker	Episode: Write On, Thelma
1978	C.P.O. Sharkey	Mrs. Holland	Episode: Captain's Right Hand Man
1979	Visions	Vinny	Episode: Ladies in Waiting
1980	M*A*S*H	Red Cross Worker Betty Halpern	Episode: Old Soldiers
1985	Tales from the Darkside	Grandma	Episode: Grandma's Last Wish
1985	Another World	Peg	2 episodes
1998	Law & Order	Mrs. Hodge	Episode: Burden
1999	Great Performances	Mother	Episode: Crazy For You

=== Stage ===
Year	Title	Role	Notes
1956	New Faces of 1956	Edna/Miss Hat/Old Lady	Ethel Barrymore Theatre, Broadway
1959	Pieces of Eight	Euphrosyne/Portia/Simpering	Julian Monk Theatre, Off-Broadway
1960	Once Upon a Mattress	Winnifred	Adelphi Theatre, West End
1962	Fortuna	Christina	Maidman Playhouse, Off-Broadway
1962	The Golden Apple	Lovey Mars	York Playhouse, Off-Broadway
1965	Drat! The Cat!	Matilda Van Guilder	Martin Beck Theatre, Broadway
1966	Mame	Agnes Gooch	Winter Garden Theatre, Broadway
1969	Dear World	Gabrielle, the Madwoman of Montmartre	Mark Hellinger Theatre, Broadway
1972	Lysistrata	Gamma	Brooks Atkinson Theatre, Broadway
1983	Mame	Agnes Gooch	Gershwin Theatre, Broadway
1985	Oh, Boy!	Aunt Penelope Budd	Carnegie Hall
1986	Me and My Girl	Maria	Marquis Theatre, Broadway
1989	Lend Me a Tenor	Julia	Royale Theatre, Broadway
1992	Crazy For You	Mother	Shubert Theatre, Broadway
1995	Call Me Madam	Grand Duchess Sophie	New York City Center, Off-Broadway
1995	Moon Over Buffalo	Ethel	Martin Beck Theatre, Broadway
1999	Sail Away	Mrs. Sweeney	Carnegie Hall
2000	The Student Prince	Grand Duchess Anastasia	Paper Mill Playhouse
2001	The Adventures of Tom Sawyer	Widow Douglas	Minskoff Theatre, Broadway
2001	The Full Monty	Jeanette Burmeister (Replacement)	Eugene O'Neill Theatre, Broadway

== Awards and nominations ==
Year	Organization	Category	Work	Result	Ref.
1987	Tony Awards	Best Featured Actress in a Musical	Me and My Girl	Nominated	
