= Audrey Christie =

American actress (1912–1989)

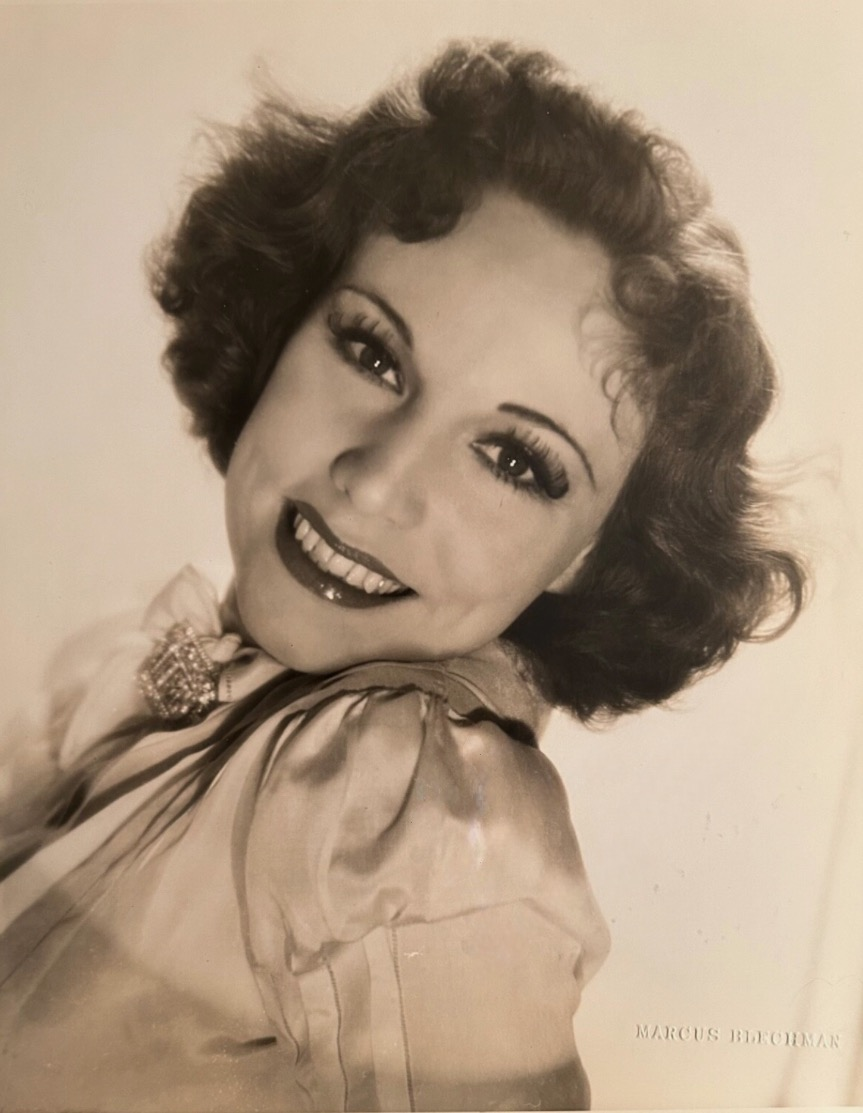
- Christie in 1941
- Born: June 27, 1912 (Note: Some sources cite 1910 as Christie's year of birth.); Chicago, Illinois, US
- Died: December 19, 1989 (aged 77); West Hollywood, California, US
- Occupation: Actress
- Years active: 1929–1982
- Spouse(s): Guy Robertson (m. 1938; div. 1942) Donald Briggs (m. 1959; died 1986)
- Children: 2

Audrey Christie (June 27, 1912 – December 19, (Note: The Los Angeles Times reported her death date as December 20.) 1989) was an American actress, singer and dancer.

== Early life ==
Christie was born in Chicago, Illinois. She attended a fine arts school in Chicago, but she quit at age 15 after finding success as a performer with the Six Chicago Steppers.

== Career ==
Originally, Christie worked as a singer and dancer, starting as a teenager in vaudeville shows, but she later acted in dramatic roles as well. Early roles on Broadway included Follow Thru (1929), Sailor, Beware! (1933), The Women (1936), I Married an Angel (1938), and Without Love (1942). She had a lead role in The Desk Set (1956).

In the 1930s Christie was a favorite of audiences at the Muny Opera in St. Louis when she was "a young girl in a flamboyant costume, roaring toward the footlights on a motorcycle or leaping in a clownish dance routine across the stage."

She performed in the films Keeper of the Flame (1943), Deadline – U.S.A. (1952), Carousel (1956), Splendor in the Grass (1961), The Unsinkable Molly Brown (1964), Harlow (1965), Frankie and Johnny (1966), The Ballad of Josie (1967), Mame (1974), and Harper Valley PTA (1978).

Christie acted in several episodes of the anthology TV series Studio One and another TV series, Fair Exchange. During the 1964–1965 television season, she had a recurring role on the situation comedy The Cara Williams Show. In 1975, she appeared on the sitcom Maude, playing the role of Maude's overbearing mother. And on TV's Barney Miller appeared in two episode, 'The Courtesans' as a "Madame", and in the episode 'Old Love' as an overbearing stage mother.

She won a Donaldson Award for her performance in the play The Voice of the Turtle.

== Personal life and death ==
Christie married Guy Robertson, also a performer, on January 30, 1938, in Jersey City, New Jersey, and they had a daughter. They separated on September 4, 1941, and were divorced on September 8, 1942.

Her second marriage was to actor Donald Briggs, who predeceased her. They had a son and three grandchildren. Although both of them were from Chicago, they met only when they were in a touring company of the play Without Love. After marriage, they generally maintained separate careers, only occasionally working together on television or in stock theater.

Christie died of emphysema on December 19, 1989, at her home in West Hollywood, California.

== Filmography ==
Year	Title	Role	Notes
1943	Keeper of the Flame	Jane Harding	
1952	Deadline – U.S.A.	Mrs. Willebrandt	
1956	Carousel	Mrs. Mullin	
1961	Splendor in the Grass	Frieda Loomis	
1964	The Unsinkable Molly Brown	Mrs. Gladys McGraw	
1965	Harlow	Thelma	
1966	Frankie and Johnny	Peg	
1967	The Ballad of Josie	Annabelle Pettijohn	
1974	Mame	Mrs. Upson	
1975	Maude	Mother "Florence" Chadbourne	
1978	Harper Valley PTA	Flora Simpson Reilly	
