= Gordon Connell (actor) =

American actor

- Publicity Photo of Gordon Connell
- Born: William Gordon Connell; March 19, 1923; Berkeley, California, United States
- Died: June 12, 2016 (aged 93); Englewood, New Jersey, United States
- Occupations: Actor; singer; composer; dancer
- Spouse(s): Jane Connell (1948–2013; her death); 2 children

Gordon Connell (March 19, 1923 – June 12, 2016) was an American actor, singer, and dancer.

== Personal life ==
Born William Gordon Connell in Berkeley, California, Connell married Jane Sperry Bennett (aka Jane Connell), a fellow actress and singer, also a native of Berkeley in 1948. They had two daughters. Jane and Gordon began their careers performing at such San Francisco night clubs as The Purple Onion and The Hungry I.

== Career ==
They gravitated to New York City. In the late 1950s and early 1960s, he performed in revues at the Tamiment Playhouse in the Poconos and in several of the Julius Monk nightclub revues at Upstairs at the Downstairs, including Monk's "Pieces of Eight" and "Dressed to the Nines". He made his Broadway debut in Subways Are For Sleeping in 1961.

Additional stage credits include Hello, Dolly!, Big River and The Human Comedy. The Connells appeared together on Broadway twice: in a musical version of Lysistrata (1972) and The Good Doctor (1998). His television credits include Green Acres, The Love Boat, The Jeffersons, The Incredible Hulk, and Sex and the City. His sole feature film appearance was a small role in Roman Polanski's Rosemary's Baby.

Connell was also a musical theater composer who wrote humorous cabaret songs as well as the score for the award-winning musical Bertha the Sewing Machine Girl.

== Death ==
Jane Connell died on September 22, 2013, at age 87. Gordon Connell died on June 12, 2016, at the age of 93. Both died at Lillian Booth Actors Home of the Actors Fund in Englewood, New Jersey.

== Filmography ==
- Rosemary's Baby (1968) – Allen Stone – Guy's Agent (uncredited)
