= Robert E. Lee (playwright) =

American dramatist

Robert Edwin Lee
- Born: October 15, 1918; Elyria, Ohio, U.S.
- Died: July 8, 1994 (aged 75); Los Angeles, California, U.S.
- Occupations: Playwright, lyricist
- Spouse: Janet Waldo (m. 1948)
- Children: 2
- Writing career
- Years active: 1948–1994
- Notable works: Auntie Mame, Inherit the Wind

Robert Edwin Lee (October 15, 1918 – July 8, 1994) was an American playwright and lyricist. In the early years of World War II, Lee partnered with Jerome Lawrence to create Armed Forces Radio while serving together in the U.S. Army. Lawrence and Lee continued to work together on radio and in the theater.

== Life and career ==
Lee was born in Elyria, Ohio, the son of Elvira (née Taft), a teacher, and C. Melvin Lee, an engineer. He attended Ohio Wesleyan University.

Lawrence and Lee became the most prolific writing partnership in radio, with such long-running series as Favorite Story, Hallmark Playhouse, and The Railroad Hour, among others.

Lawrence and Lee turned to the live theatre in 1955 with Inherit the Wind, which remains among the most-produced plays in the American theatre. They are also well known for the plays Auntie Mame and First Monday in October. In 1965, Lawrence and Lee founded the American Playwrights' Theatre, a plan to bypass the commerciality of the Broadway stage, which foreshadowed the professional regional theatre movement. Their wildly successful play, The Night Thoreau Spent in Jail, was produced through the American Playwrights Theatre, and premiered at Lawrence's alma mater, Ohio State University, which also commissioned their play on the life and times of James Thurber, Jabberwock (1972).

In all, they collaborated on 39 works, and, with James Hilton, a 1956 musical adaptation of Hilton's novel Lost Horizon, entitled Shangri-La. They also adapted Auntie Mame into the hit musical Mame with composer Jerry Herman, which won a Tony Award for its star, Angela Lansbury. Less successful was the Lawrence and Lee collaboration with Herman, also starring Lansbury, Dear World, a musical adaptation of Jean Giraudoux's The Madwoman of Chaillot.

Several of Lawrence and Lee's plays draw on events from United States history to speak to contemporary issues. Inherit the Wind (1955) addressed intellectual freedom and McCarthyism by speaking of a fictionalized Scopes Monkey Trial. The Gang's All Here (1959) examined government corruption in the 1920s. The Night Thoreau Spent in Jail (1970) was a Vietnam-era exploration of Thoreau's resistance to an earlier war.

The Jerome Lawrence and Robert E. Lee Theatre Research Institute, a theater research facility and archive, was dedicated in Lawrence and Lee's honor at the Ohio State University in 1986.

== Personal life ==
Lee was married to actress Janet Waldo (the voice of many well-known cartoon characters, including Judy Jetson) from 1948 until his death in 1994. Together they had two children, Jonathan Barlow Lee, the production manager for Center Theatre Group's Mark Taper Forum in Los Angeles, and Lucy Lee, who teaches Clinical Management Communication at the Marshall School of Business, University of Southern California, in Los Angeles.

== Death ==
Lee died from cancer on July 8, 1994, in Los Angeles, California, at the age of 75. He is buried in Forest Lawn – Hollywood Hills Cemetery.

== Works (partial) ==
- Look, Ma, I'm Dancin'! – 1948 (book of musical)
- Inherit the Wind – 1955 (play)
- Shangri-La – 1956 (book & lyrics of musical)
- Auntie Mame – 1956 (play)
- The Gang's All Here – 1959 (play)
- Only in America – 1959 – (play)
- A Call on Kuprin – 1961 – (play)
- Diamond Orchid – 1965 – (play)
- Mame – 1966 – (book of musical based on his play Auntie Mame)
- Dear World – 1969 (book of musical)
- The Night Thoreau Spent in Jail – 1970 (play)
- The Incomparable Max – 1971 (play)
- Jabberwock – 1972 (play)
- Blackbeard The Pirate- 1974 (book)
- First Monday in October – 1978 – (play)
