= Jerome Lawrence =

American dramatist

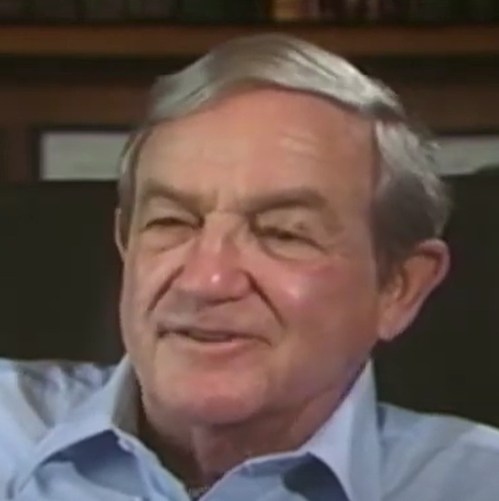
- Born: July 14, 1915; Cleveland, Ohio, U.S.
- Died: February 29, 2004 (aged 88); Malibu, California, U.S.
- Occupations: Playwright, Screenwriter
- Writing career
- Notable works: Auntie Mame, Inherit the Wind

Jerome Lawrence (born Jerome Lawrence Schwartz; July 14, 1915 – February 29, 2004) was an American playwright and author. After graduating from Ohio State University in 1937 and the University of California, Los Angeles in 1939, Lawrence partnered with Robert Edwin Lee to help create Armed Forces Radio while serving together in the U.S. Army during World War II. The two built a partnership over their lifetimes, and continued to collaborate on screenplays and musicals until Lee's death in 1994.

Lawrence and Lee won acclaim for the 1955 play Inherit the Wind, based on the Scopes trial. Lawrence describes their plays as "shar[ing] the theme of the dignity of every individual mind, and that mind's life-long battle against limitation and censorship". The two deliberately avoided Broadway later in their careers and formed the American Playwrights Theater in 1963 to help promote their plays. After Lee's death, Lawrence continued to write plays in his Malibu, California, home. He died in Malibu on February 29, 2004, from complications of a stroke.

== Life and career ==
Jerome Lawrence Schwartz was born in Cleveland, Ohio, on July 14, 1915. Lawrence's father, Samuel Schwartz, operated a printing press, while his mother Sarah (née Rogen) wrote poetry and did volunteer work. After he graduated from Glenville High School in 1933, Lawrence attended the Ohio State University, where he graduated with a bachelor's degree in 1937. While a student at Ohio State, Lawrence was initiated into the Nu chapter of the Zeta Beta Tau fraternity, a historically Jewish social fraternity. Two years later, he completed graduate studies at the University of California, Los Angeles.

Lawrence worked for several small newspapers as a reporter/editor before moving into radio as a writer for CBS. In 1941, Lawrence, who was still using his surname Schwartz professionally, co-created with Aleen Leslie the radio series A Date with Judy, which was based on Leslie's “One Girl Chorus” column in the Pittsburgh Press. Lawrence left the show in 1943, and in the meantime began using his middle name as his last name.

With his writing partner, Robert E. Lee, Lawrence worked for Armed Forces Radio while serving together in the U.S. Army during World War II. Lawrence and Lee became the most prolific writing partnership in radio, with such long-running series as Favorite Story, Hallmark Playhouse, and The Railroad Hour, among others.

Lawrence and Lee turned to the live theatre in 1955 with Inherit the Wind, which remains among the most-produced plays in the American theatre. They also collaborated on the plays Auntie Mame, The Incomparable Max, and First Monday in October, among others. In 1965, they founded the American Playwrights' Theatre, a plan to bypass the commerciality of the Broadway stage, which foreshadowed the professional regional theatre movement. Their wildly successful play, The Night Thoreau Spent in Jail, was produced through the American Playwrights Theatre, and premiered at Lawrence's alma mater, Ohio State, which also commissioned their play on the life and times of James Thurber, Jabberwock (1972).

In all, they collaborated on 39 works, including a 1956 musical adaptation of James Hilton's Lost Horizon, entitled Shangri-La, with the author himself. They also adapted Auntie Mame into the hit musical Mame with composer Jerry Herman, which won a Tony Award for its star, Angela Lansbury. Less successful was the Lawrence and Lee collaboration with Herman, also starring Lansbury, Dear World, a musical adaptation of Giraudoux's The Madwoman of Chaillot. They also co-wrote a script for a made-for-television Pride and Prejudice film, which was never produced.

Several of Lawrence and Lee's plays draw on events from United States history to speak to contemporary issues. Inherit the Wind (1955) addressed intellectual freedom and McCarthyism through a fictionalized version of the Scopes Monkey Trial. The Gang's All Here (1959) examined government corruption in the 1920s. The Night Thoreau Spent in Jail (1970) was a Vietnam-era exploration of Thoreau's resistance to an earlier war.

Lawrence taught playwriting in the Master of Professional Writing Program at the University of Southern California. Lawrence's one Tony Award nomination was for Best Book of a Musical for Mame.

He died due to complications from a stroke in Malibu, California.

The Jerome Lawrence and Robert E. Lee Theatre Research Institute, a research facility and archive, was dedicated in Lawrence and Lee's honor at the Ohio State University in 1986.

His niece is flutist Paula Robison.
