= Dear World (disambiguation) =

Dear World is a Broadway musical, first staged in 1969.

Dear World may also refer to:

- "Dear World", the title track from the musical, written in 1968
- Dear World (Original Broadway Cast Recording), 1969 cast album of the musical
- "Dear World", a song by David Gates from the 1994 album Love Is Always Seventeen
- "Dear World", a song by Echosmith from the 2017 album Inside a Dream
- "Dear World", a song by Nine Inch Nails from the 2016 EP Not the Actual Events
- "Dear World", photography project founded by Robert X. Fogarty in 2010.

== See also ==
- Dear (disambiguation)
- World (disambiguation)
