= Dear World (song) =

1968 title track from Dear World

"Dear World" is a song composed and written by Jerry Herman. It was first recorded in 1968 by American singers Steve Lawrence and Eydie Gormé, Ray Conniff and his singers, and most notably by Jimmy Durante and Maurice Chevalier, whose version was released as a single by Warner Bros. Records and managed to reach the US Easy Listening chart.

"Dear World" later appeared in the Broadway musical also titled Dear World. The show premiered in 1969, with a Broadway original cast album following soon after. Reviewers noted the similarity of the song to Herman's other compositions such as "Hello Dolly!" and "Mame".

== Background and composition ==
American composer Jerry Herman wrote the musical Dear World, which was based on a book by Jerome Lawrence and Robert E. Lee. The musical opened on Broadway in 1969 with only 132 performances and was not a success. An original cast album did appear during the musical's run, even reaching the charts. It featured the title track three times (in the overture, as a song on its own, and in the finale).

== Jimmy Durante and Maurice Chevalier's version ==
"Dear World"
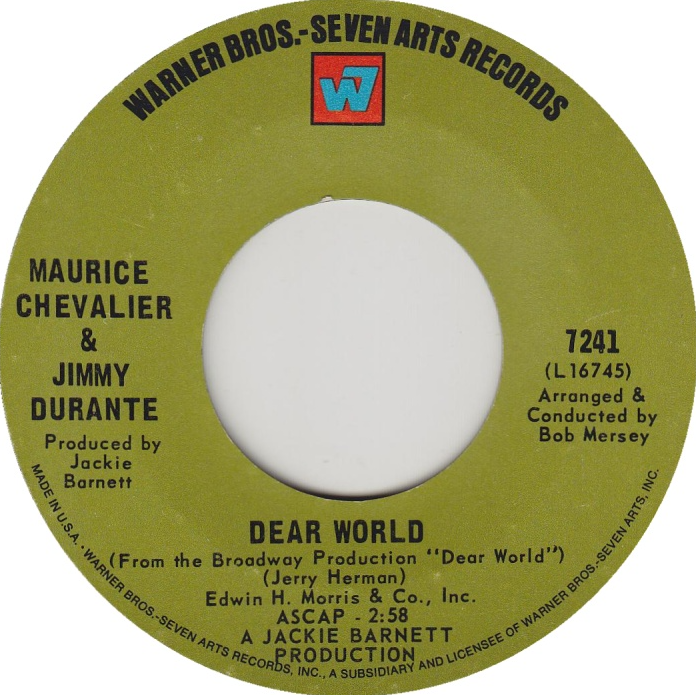

Single by Jimmy Durante and Maurice Chevalier
- B-side: "We're Going U.F.O.-ing"
- Released: October 1968
- Studio: Several
- Length: 2:53
- Label: RCA Victor
- Songwriter: Jerry Herman
- Producer: Jackie Barnett

Jimmy Durante singles chronology
"Hellzapoppin'" (1966)	"Dear World" (1968)	"He Touched Me" (1968)

Professional ratings
Review scores
Source	Rating
Record World	4/5 stars
Cashbox	Positive (Best Bet)
Billboard	Positive (Special Merit Pick)

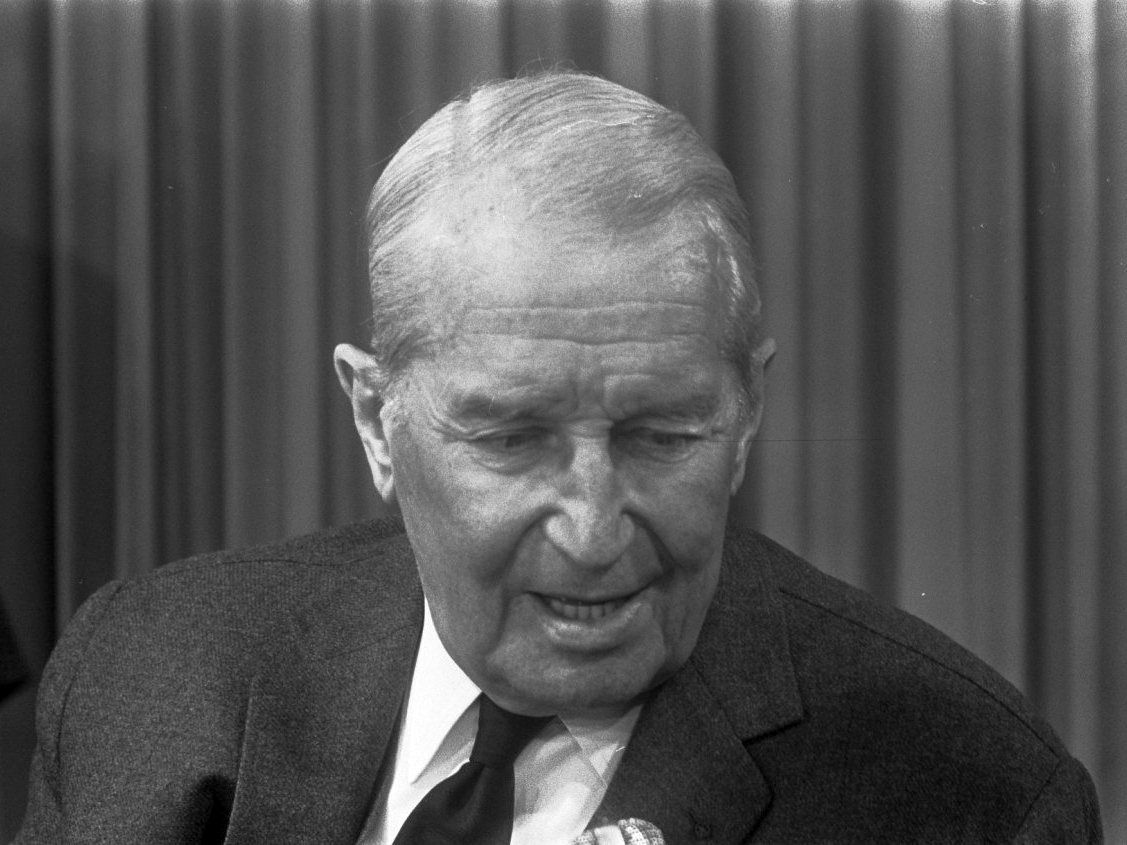
Maurice Chevalier in early 1968.

=== Background and recording ===
Jimmy Durante was an American vaudeville star and radio personality almost forty years before the song, and an actor as well. Durante notably appeared in the Cole Porter musical The New Yorkers, which opened on Broadway on December 8, 1930. Towards the 1960s, he started recording albums such as One of Those Songs and September Song. On the other hand, Maurice Chevalier was a French singer, actor, and entertainer. His song "Thank Heaven for Little Girls", among many others, became widely known in the US and he toured there often. He also starred in multiple shows.

Warner Bros. set up both singers to record "Dear World". They used a split-recording technique; a team recorded Chevalier's portion outside Paris, with Durante's in Hollywood. The recordings were mixed at the latter. It was produced by Jackie Barnett. The arrangement is credited to Bob Mersey.

=== Reception ===
The single received a positive critical reception. Record World put the single in its "Four Stars" singles section, saying that "Seemingly incongruent voices offer each other pleasant complement," noting that it's a "Happy version the DJs will love." Cashbox magazine reviewed the single on October 26, 1968, and noted that "Another version of the title tune from Jerry Herman's new Broadway comer, this time with the obvious adult format name appeal or Maurice Chevalier and Jimmy Durante." They described it as a "Cute enough and spunky arrangement behind a chuckling vocal interpretation." Billboard magazine referred to it as "two fine performances", calling it "a Winner!"

=== Release and chart performance ===
"Dear World" was released as a single by Durante's label Warner Bros. in October 1968. It was backed on the B-side by the song "We're Going U-F-Oing" lifted from One of Those Songs. The single was distributed as a seven-inch vinyl single and received a positive critical reception as mentioned above. The song entered the American Billboard Easy Listening chart in November 1968 and spent a total of three weeks there. It reached number 30 on the chart in December. It was Chevalier's first and last single to reach the chart in his career. "Dear World" was Durante's third and final appearance on the chart. The song debuted on Record World's Top Non-Rock charts in December, being ranked at a lower 31, and dropping out of the chart by 1969.

=== Track listing ===
7" vinyl single

- "Dear World" – 2:53
- "We're Going U.F.O.-ing" – 2:28

=== Charts ===
Weekly chart performance for "Dear World"
Chart (1968)	Peak position
US Billboard Easy Listening	30
US Record World Top Non-Rock	31
