= Dear World (Original Broadway Cast Recording) =

1969 cast recording by the original Broadway cast

Cast recording by the original Broadway cast
- Released: February 21, 1969
- Recorded: February 9, 1969
- Studios: Mark Hellinger Theatre, New York City, NY
- Genre: Show tunes
- Length: 46:41
- Label: Columbia
- Producer: Thomas Z. Shepard

Jerry Herman chronology
Mame (1966)	Dear World (1969)	An Evening With Jerry Herman (1974)

Singles from Dear World
- 1. "I Don't Want to Know / One Person" Released: February 25, 1969

Dear World is an album containing a recording of the 1969 Broadway musical Dear World made by its original cast, with Angela Lansbury in the lead role. The album's music and lyrics were written by Jerry Herman. Produced by Thomas Z. Shepard, the album contains fourteen tracks. Columbia Records released the album on February 21, 1969. Dear World has been released in several formats since then, including a remastered version on CD in the 1990s.

The album received mixed reviews, with a reviewer for High Fidelity calling out the "hypocrisy," while a retrospective by Ruhlmann at AllMusic said that there was a "bad mix of talented creators" present. Other reviewers for Cashbox and Record World magazines instead praised Herman's songs. Despite the mixed critical response, the album reached the bottom half of the US album charts at peak positions varying from No. 128 to No. 75, and two songs were taken from the album to form a single released on February 25, 1969. However, the single did not chart.

== Background and content ==
Songwriter Jerry Herman received immense success in the mid 1960s with his musicals Hello, Dolly! along with Mame and their soundtracks. Herman cast actress Angela Lansbury, like in Mame, for the lead role in his following musical Dear World. Two songs, "Kiss Her Now" by Ed Ames and the title track by Jimmy Durante and Maurice Chevalier, had already become easy listening hits in late 1968. Based on a play by Jean Giraudoux, the musical was expected to be another success. After opening on February 6, 1969, the show closed just a few months after with only 132 total performances. Despite the musical's mostly negative reception, Lansbury managed to win the Tony Award for Best Actress in a Musical in April 1969.

Herman incorporated French-sounding music for the songs in the musical, which was set in Paris, France. The theme was described as "anti-establishment", in topics such as pollution addressed with songs like "The Spring of Next Year". The album also included the ballad "And I Was Beautiful", the marching song "One Person", the waltz "I Don't Want to Know", and a medley of songs under the title of "The Tea Party", performed by Jane Connell, Carmen Mathews, and Lansbury. "And I Was Beautiful" was also the song Herman felt most fond of. In total, Lansbury appeared as the lead singer on eight of the soundtrack's main songs.

== Recording and release ==
The album was recorded at Mark Hellinger Theatre in New York City on February 9, 1969. The theatre was where the musical itself premiered as well. Twelve days later, Columbia Records released the album in the US. Dear World was Columbia's first soundtrack album to be released in 1969, and was available in LP, 8-track cartridge, and 4-track cartridge tape formats. "I Don't Want to Know" was released as a single on February 25, backed by "One Person" on the B-side. However, the lead single did not chart. In 1992, Shepard remastered the album and released it on CD. In August 2008, Columbia Masterworks released the album to digital streaming sites, as well as MP3 stores. It contained a bonus track: "And I Was Beautiful" played on piano by Herman himself.

== Critical reception ==
=== Contemporary reviews ===
Contemporary reviews were mixed, with critics either praising the songs or disliking the concept. Cashbox magazine stated that although music critics weren't fond of Dear World, "the warm and graceful tunes and deft lyrics of Jerry Herman" helped bring out the soundtrack's impact. Record World called Herman's songs "evocative" and believed that Lansbury performed them "winningly." Similarly, Billboard called the songs "lively and melodic," noting that the renditions by the cast "are all first-rate." High Fidelity considered the soundtrack to represent "blatant hypocrisy", accusing Herman of pretending to criticize the establishment while being part of and benefiting from it. The Edmonton Journal believed that "nothing about the actual play is revealed in the soundtrack recording," saying that they "keep it a deep, dark secret hidden away as is par for [...] most soundtracks."

=== Retrospectives ===
Professional ratings
Review scores
Source	Rating
AllMusic	3/5 stars

In his retrospective review for AllMusic, William Ruhlmann felt that the musical struggled to connect with its late-1960s setting, as its themes evoked an earlier era of glamour. He observed that the title song sought to replicate the popular success of Herman's earlier compositions "Hello, Dolly!" and "Mame", plus one of his "trademark march songs," "One Person". Ruhlmann notes that the "seven-minute 'The Tea Party,' a colloquy among crazy women" was "far from his usual style." He concluded that the project "was a bad mix of talented creators and good source material that just weren't suited to each other."

== Chart performance ==
While the musical received a negative perception, the soundtrack album managed to chart. It debuted on Billboard magazine's Top LP's chart in the issue dated April 5, 1969, peaking at No. 128 during an eight-week run on the chart. The album entered the Cashbox magazine's Top 100 Albums chart in the issue dated March 29, 1969, peaking at No. 75 during a five-week run on it. Dear World debuted on the Record World 100 Top LP's chart in the issue dated April 5, 1969, reaching a higher No. 70 during a five-week run on it as well.

== Track listing ==
=== Vinyl version ===
All lyrics are written by Jerry Herman; all music is composed by Jerry Herman.

Side one
No.	Title	Artist(s)	Length
1.	"Overture"	Dear World Orchestra	5:30
2.	"The Spring of Next Year"	The Corporation	1:49
3.	"Each Tomorrow Morning"	Angela Lansbury and all	4:39
4.	"I Don't Want to Know"	Angela Lansbury	2:39
5.	"I've Never Said I Love You"	Pamela Hall	3:37
6.	"Garbage"	All, Angela Lansbury, Jane Connell, Milo O'Shea	3:21
7.	"Dear World"	All, Angela Lansbury	3:54
Total length:			25:29

Side two
No.	Title	Artist(s)	Length
1.	"I Don't Want to Know (Ballet)"	Dear World Orchestra	2:27
2.	"Kiss Her Now"	Angela Lansbury	2:04
3.	"The Tea Party: Memories/Pearls/Dickie/Thoughts"	Carmen Mathews, Jane Connell, Angela Lansbury	7:26
4.	"And I Was Beautiful"	Angela Lansbury	2:54
5.	"Each Tomorrow Morning - Reprise"	Kurt Peterson	1:26
6.	"One Person"	Angela Lansbury and all	2:31
7.	"Finale (Reprises)"	Dear World, Company	2:24
Total length:			21:12

=== Digital version ===
No.	Title	Artist(s)	Length
1.	"Overture"	Dear World Orchestra	5:30
2.	"The Spring of Next Year"	The Corporation	1:49
3.	"Each Tomorrow Morning"	Angela Lansbury and all	4:39
4.	"I Don't Want to Know"	Angela Lansbury	2:39
5.	"I've Never Said I Love You"	Pamela Hall	3:37
6.	"Garbage"	All, Angela Lansbury, Jane Connell, Milo O'Shea	3:21
7.	"Dear World"	All, Angela Lansbury	3:54
8.	"I Don't Want to Know (Ballet)"	Dear World Orchestra	2:27
9.	"Kiss Her Now"	Angela Lansbury	2:04
10.	"The Tea Party"	Carmen Mathews, Jane Connell, Angela Lansbury	7:26
11.	"And I Was Beautiful"	Angela Lansbury	2:54
12.	"Each Tomorrow Morning (Reprise)"	Kurt Peterson	1:26
13.	"One Person"	Angela Lansbury and all	2:31
14.	"Finale"	Dear World, Company	2:06
15.	"And I Was Beautiful - Bonus Track"	Dear World Orchestra pianist	2:24
Total length:			48:53

== Charts ==
Weekly chart performance for Dear World
Chart (1969)	Peak position
US Billboard Top LP's	128
US Cashbox Top 100 Albums	75
US Record World 100 Top LP's	70

== Personnel ==
All credits are adapted from the liner notes of Dear World.

- Maurice Valency – adapted by
- Dorothea Freitag – dance and incidental arrangements
- Donald Pippin – vocal arrangements, music director
- Thomas Z. Shepard – album producer
- Jerry Adler – production supervisor
- Hildy Parks – co-producer
- Roy A. Somlyo – co-producer
- Milo O'Shea – featured performer; vocals as the Sewerman
- Carmen Mathews – featured performer; vocals as Constance
- Jane Connell – featured performer; vocals as Gabrielle
- Kurt Peterson – featured performer; vocals as Julian
- Pamela Hall – featured performer; vocals as Little Nina
- Fay Gage – illustration
- Charles Burr – liner notes
- Jerry Herman – music and lyrics
- Philip J. Lang – orchestrations
- Jean Giraudoux – based on a play by
- Jerome Lawrence – book
- Robert E. Lee – book

== Release history ==
Release history and formats for Dear World
Region	Date	Format	Label	Ref.
United States and Canada	February 21, 1969	LP; Vinyl	Columbia Records	
United States and Canada	February 1969	8-track cartridge tape	Columbia Records	
United States and Canada	February 1969	4-track cartridge tape	Columbia Records	
United States and United Kingdom	1992	Compact disc	Sony Broadway	
Worldwide	August 5, 2008	MP3; Music download; streaming	Columbia Masterworks/Sony Music Entertainment	
