= The Young Lovers =

Young Lover or Young Lovers may refer to:

== Film and television ==
- The Young Lovers (1949 film), American drama about dancer afflicted with polio
- The Young Lovers (1954 film), British Cold War drama
- "Young Lovers", March 29, 1957 episode of American program, The Big Story (radio and TV series)
- "The Young Lovers", October 14, 1961 episode of American program, The Defenders (1961 TV series)
- The Young Lovers (1964 film), American romantic drama
- Young Lovers, Hong Kong–based Shaw Brothers 1966 film; starring Angela Yu Chien
- The Young Lovers, Hong Kong–based Kam Kwok/Chi Leun 1967 film; starring Connie Chan
- Young Lovers, Hong Kong–based Shaw Brothers/Celestial Pictures 1970 film; written and directed by Umetsugu Inoue
- Young Lovers, Tagalog-language 1971 film; starring Vilma Santos
- Young Lovers, Taiwan-based 1978 film; starring Charlie Chin
- Young Lovers, Hong Kong–based Shaw Brothers 1979 film; starring Derek Yee
- Young Lovers, 1979 Egyptian film, directed by Henry Barakat
- Young Lovers, 2001 Argentine telenovela, see List of Argentine telenovelas
- The Young Lovers, 2022 Franco-Belgian film; starring Fanny Ardant

== Music ==
- "Young Lovers" (song), a 1963 song performed by Paul & Paula
- "Young Lover", song by Richard Kerr (songwriter)
- "Young Lover", song by Gino Vannelli from Juno Awards of 1987

== Other uses ==
- The Young Lovers (sculpture), an outdoor work by Georg Ehrlich in London, UK

== See also ==
- Hello Young Lovers (disambiguation)
