= The Hits of Broadway and Hollywood =

Studio album by Ed Ames
- Released: October 1968
- Studios: RCA's Music Center of the World, Hollywood, California
- Genres: Pop; Traditional pop
- Labels: RCA Victor; LPM-4079 (mono)/LSP-4079 (stereo)
- Producer: Jim Foglesong

Ed Ames chronology
Sings Apologize (1968)	The Hits of Broadway and Hollywood (1968)	A Time for Living, a Time for Hope (1969)

Singles from The Hits of Broadway and Hollywood
- 1. "Kiss Her Now" Released: October 1968

Professional ratings
Review scores
Source	Rating
AllMusic	3/5 stars
The Encyclopedia of Popular Music	3/5 stars

The Hits of Broadway and Hollywood is a studio album by American pop singer Ed Ames. It was released in October 1968 via RCA Victor and was the twelfth studio album of his career. The Hits of Broadway and Hollywood contained 11 tracks from various musicals, films, and shows, including the single "Kiss Her Now", which reached the top-25 of the Billboard Easy Listening and the top-65 of the RPM Top 100 Singles pop charts. The album received positive reviews from several contemporary publications and became another charting release for the singer.

== Recording and content ==
The songs were recorded at RCA's Music Center of the World, located in Hollywood, California. All of them were produced by Jim Foglesong. Arrangements were provided by Perry Botkin Jr.. The show tuness' age spanned from recent compositions in 1968, to old musical songs from 1928. "The Look of Love" had become a pop hit for Dusty Springfield, while the 1965 "On a Clear Day" was an Easy Listening hit for singer Johnny Mathis. Less popular selections included "Walking Happy", "How Are Things in Glocca Morra?", and "Who Will Buy?". "I Can't Give You Anything but Love, Baby" was the only standard on the LP, originally from the Broadway musical Blackbirds of 1928.

== Release and critical reception ==
The Hits of Broadway and Hollywood was originally released in October 1968 by RCA Victor. It was the twelfth studio album of Ames's career and also his third of the year. The label originally offered it as a vinyl LP, with six songs on "Side A" and five songs on "Side B". The album has not been rereleased on digital streaming platforms. The album was given a positive review from Record World magazine following its original release. The publication noted that the album "contains some of Ed's prettiest singing and some pretty songs like 'Kiss Her Now'." Billboard magazine stated that "Ames has gone through Broadway and Hollywood's top drawer for a charming wrap-up of show and screen songs." They believed that "The material is all top-flight, and Ames knows just what to do with it." Retrospectively, the album was rated 3 out of 5 stars by both AllMusic's editors and The Encyclopedia of Popular Music.

== Chart performance and singles ==
The Hits of Broadway and Hollywood successfully reached the US pop album charts, though its performance on them varied significantly. It debuted on Billboard magazine's Top LP's chart in the issue dated December 21, 1968, peaking at No. 186 during a six-week run on the chart. The album debuted on Cashbox magazine's Top 100 Albums chart in the issue dated November 16, 1968, peaking at No. 70 during a seven-week run on it. The album debuted on Record World magazine's 100 Top LP's chart in the issue dated November 9, 1968, peaking at No. 66 during a nine-week run on it.

One lead single was included on The Hits of Broadway and Hollywood. "Kiss Her Now" was first released by RCA Victor as a single in early October 1968. The song was Ames's first show tune recording since "My Cup Runneth Over" hit in 1966. It became a top-25 single on America's Billboard adult contemporary chart, rising to the number 21 position. In Canada the single reached the pop charts instead, peaking at No. 65 on the RPM Top 100 Singles chart.

== Track listing ==
Side one
No.	Title	Writer(s)	Length
1.	"There's No Business Like Show Business" (from the musical production Annie Get Your Gun)	Berlin	3:18
2.	"How Are Things in Glocca Morra?" (from the musical production Finian's Rainbow)	Lane; Harburg	2:35
3.	"The Look of Love" (from the film Casino Royale)	Bacharach; David	2:45
4.	"Walking Happy" (from the musical production Walking Happy)	Cahn; Van Heusen	2:58
5.	"Funny Girl" (from the film Funny Girl)	Merrill; Styne	2:15
6.	"Kiss Her Now" (from the Broadway musical Dear World)	Herman	2:10

Side two
No.	Title	Writer(s)	Length
1.	"Who Will Buy?" (from the film Oliver!)	Bart	2:44
2.	"I Can't Give You Anything but Love, Baby" (from the Broadway musical Blackbirds of 1928)	Fields; McHugh	3:30
3.	"Somewhere, My Love" (Lara's Theme from Doctor Zhivago)	Jarre; Webster	2:20
4.	"The Shadow of Your Smile" (Love Theme from The Sandpiper)	Mandel; Webster	2:45
5.	"On a Clear Day (You Can See Forever)" (from the Broadway musical On a Clear Day You Can See Forever)	Lerner; Lane	2:21

== Charts ==
Chart peaks for The Hits of Broadway and Hollywood
Chart (1968–1969)	Peak position
US Billboard Top LP's	186
US Cashbox Top 100 Albums	70
US Record World 100 Top LP's	66

== Personnel ==
All credits are adapted from the liner notes of The Hits of Broadway and Hollywood.

- Ed Ames – vocals
- Jim Foglesong – producer
- Perry Botkin Jr. – arranger, conductor
- Mickey Crofford – engineer
