= Robert X Fogarty =

Photographer, social entrepreneur, and public artist

Robert Xavier Fogarty is an American photographer, social entrepreneur, and public artist. He is the founder of Dear World (photography project), a portrait photography project, and co-founder of Evacuteer, a non-profit organization focused on emergency preparedness in New Orleans.

== Early life and education ==
Fogarty was born in 1983 in Nebraska. He earned a degree in journalism from the University of Oregon School of Journalism and Communication in 2005.

== Career ==
=== Evacuteer and Evacuspots (2009 - 2013) ===
In 2008, Fogarty assisted with the evacuation of New Orleans in advance of Hurricane Gustav. The following year, he co-founded Evacuteeer, a 501(c)(3) non-profit organization that trains volunteers to assist with emergency evacuations in New Orleans. The organization developed a system to help evacuate residents who are without transportation.

In 2013, the City of New Orleans, Evacuteer, and the Arts Council of New Orleans unveiled "Evacuspots," a public art project consisting of 17, fourteen-foot tall sculptural markers designed by artist Doug Kornfeld to identify evacuation pickup locations through the city. The $200,000 project, funded by the Arts Council, demonstrated how "arts and culture intersect directly with civic goals," according to Arts Council President Kim Cook.

The Evacuspots project was noted in the "Handbook of Public Health in Natural Disasters" (2015) as an example of public art integrated into disaster planning and cited in academic literature on emergency preparedness and public health.

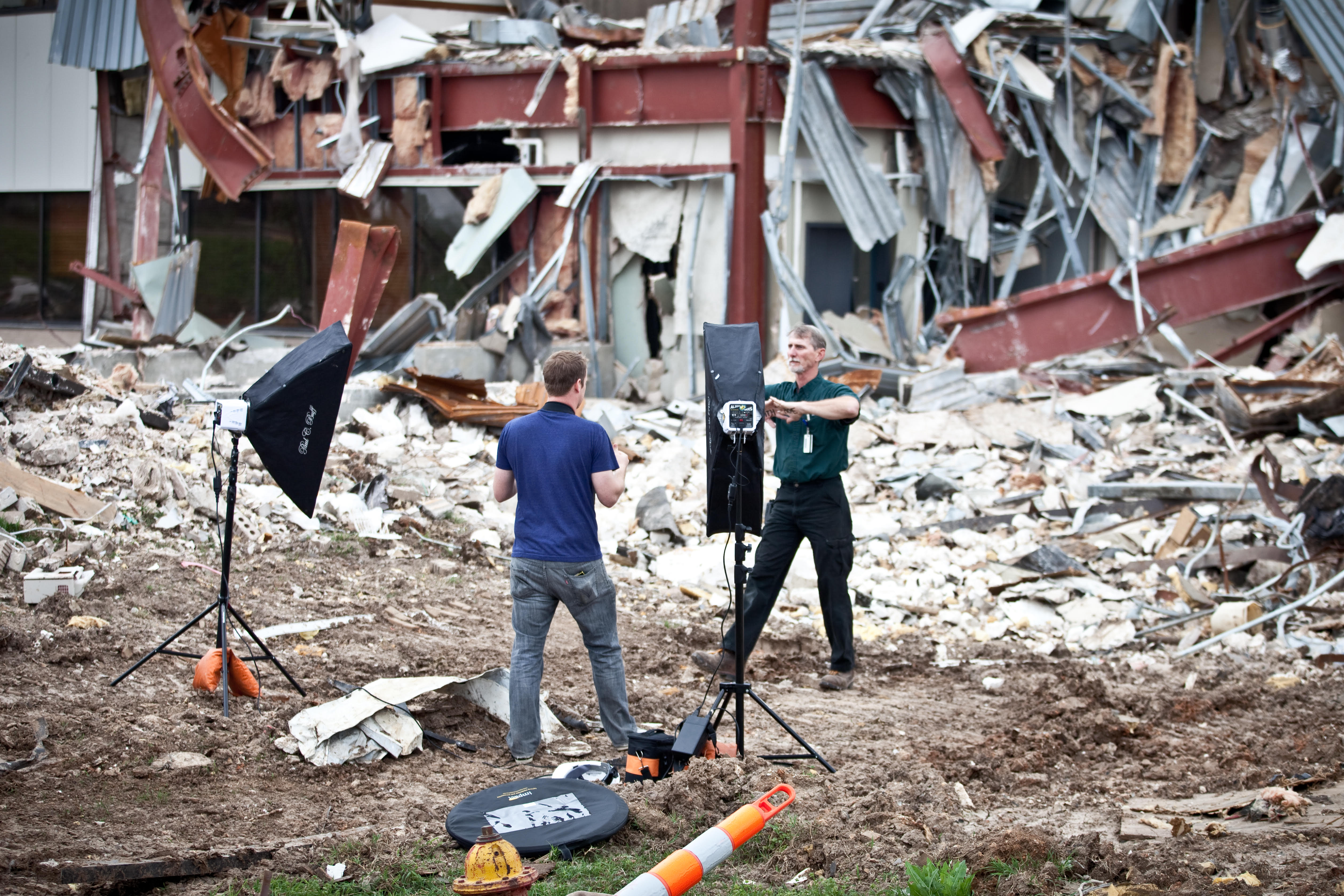

=== Dear World (2010 - Present) ===
Fogarty founded what would become Dear World in 2010. The project began as Dear New Orleans at an Evacuteer fundraising event during Super Bowl XLIV, when attendees wrote messages on their hands and were photographed. According to Fogarty, the idea for the shift to Dear World came out of "one participant's decision to share a personal story instead of an homage to the city. 'A man wrote cancer free on his chest while everyone else was writing why they loved the city,' Fogarty said. 'It changed my life and the trajectory of the project.'"

Dear World has documented survivors and communities affected by major events, including the Boston Marathon bombing in 2014, the Refugees of the Syrian civil war in 2013, the Pulse nightclub shooting in 2017, and healthcare workers during the COVID-19 pandemic in 2020.

== Speaking and Leadership ==
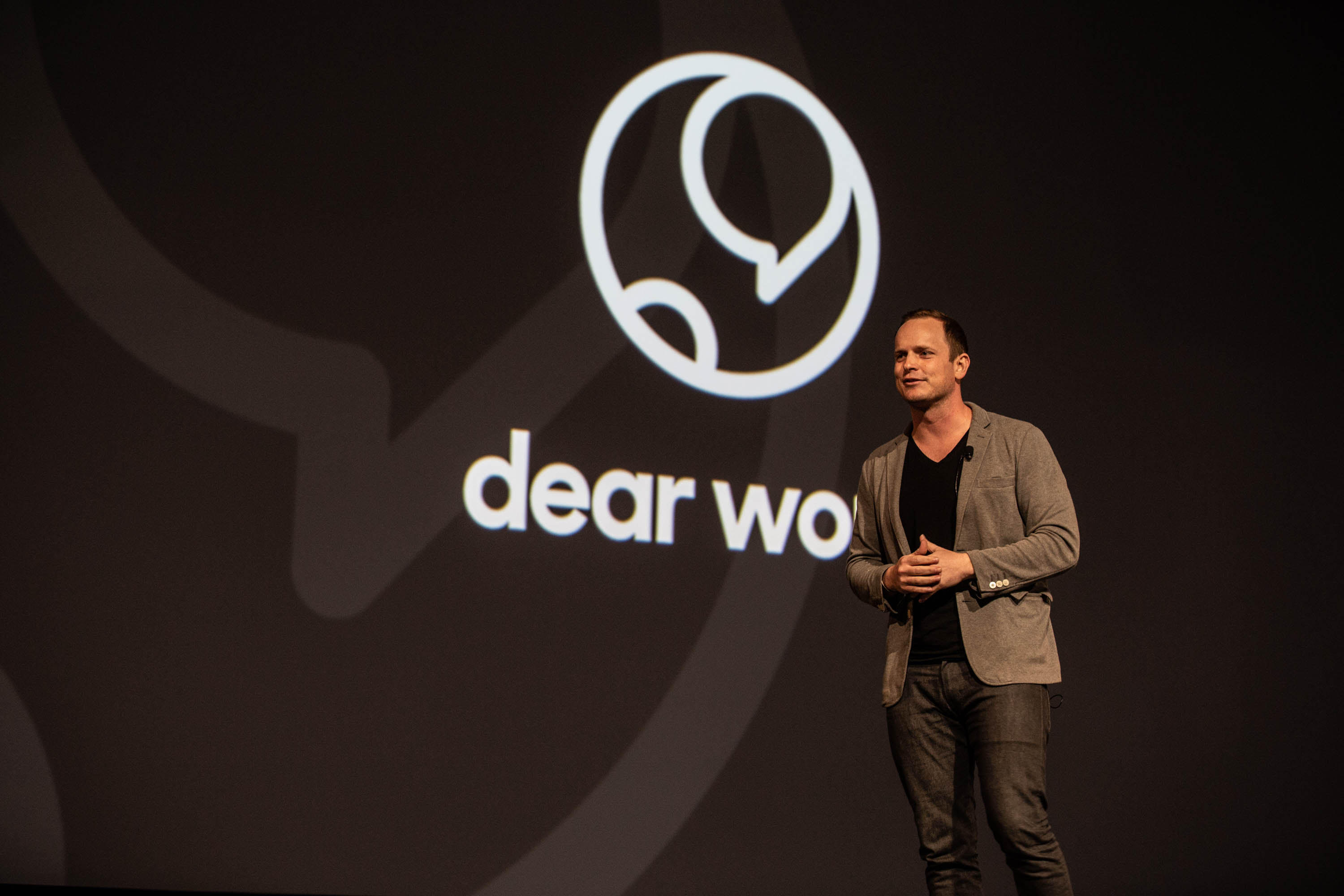
Fogarty delivering his “Dear World” leadership keynote.

Fogarty was the commencement speaker at the University of Oregon in 2014. In August 2014, Fogarty facilitated a storytelling and portrait session with the Duke University men's basketball team during orientation week. The exercise invited players to share personal experiences through written messages and group discussion. According to USA Today, the session prompted players to open up about topics including loss, family, and personal hardship. Senior guard Quinn Cook said of the experience, "People told people things they've never told anybody before." Freshman Tyus Jones noted that it allowed teammates to "open up and go a little more in-depth about ourselves." The team went on to win the NCAA Men's Basketball Championship that season.
