= Songs for Sunday =

Studio album by Jimmy Durante
- Released: 1967
- Recorded: 1967
- Genre: Gospel, spirituals
- Length: 26:05
- Label: Warner Bros. 1713
- Producer: Jackie Barnett

Jimmy Durante chronology
One of Those Songs (1966)	Songs for Sunday (1967)

Jackie Barnett Presents Songs for Sunday is a 1967 album by Jimmy Durante, with arrangements by Ralph Carmichael. David Bakish, in his 1995 book on Durante, described the music on the album as "truly from the heart". Durante later performed "Peace in the Valley" and "One of These Days" at the Oral Roberts summer festival in June 1971.

== Track listing ==
1. "Down By the River Side" (Jackie Barnett, Jimmy Durante)
2. "Precious Lord"
3. "He Touched Me"
4. "In the Garden"
5. "Somebody's Keeping Score" (Barnett, Sammy Fain)
6. "Amen" (Barnett, Durante)
7. "Beyond the Sunset"
8. "Peace In the Valley"
9. "His Eye Is On the Sparrow"
10. "One of These Days"

== Personnel ==
- Jimmy Durante – vocals
- Ralph Carmichael – arranger, conductor
- Ed Thrasher – art direction
- Lowell Frank – engineer
- Jackie Barnett – producer
