= Give a Man a Job =

1933 film

- Starring: Jimmy Durante; Frank O'Connor; Moe Howard
- Production company: Metro-Goldwyn-Mayer
- Distributed by: Metro-Goldwyn-Mayer
- Release date: 1933
- Running time: 2 minutes 45 seconds
- Country: United States
- Language: English

Give a Man a Job (also known as National Recovery Act) is a 1933 American short film produced by Metro-Goldwyn-Mayer in conjunction with the National Recovery Administration. The film encourages people to offer jobs to the unemployed in the midst of the Great Depression.

== Synopsis ==
The film features Jimmy Durante fronting a meeting, explaining to the audience through a comic song "Give a Man a Job" how they could generate employment. Upon learning that a banker drives his own car, Durante suggests that he "hire a chauffeur / And keep a good man from becoming a loafer." He also has an exchange with an exterminator, suggesting that NRA stands for "No Rats Allowed." The film closes with an image of President Franklin Roosevelt and the words "If the old name of Roosevelt / Makes your old heart throb / Then take this message, straight from the President / And give a man a job!"

== Song ==
The song "Give a Man a Job" was written by Richard Rodgers and Lorenz Hart.

== Cast ==
- Jimmy Durante as himself (uncredited)
- Frank O'Connor as the banker (uncredited)
- Moe Howard as the exterminator (uncredited)
