= Lou Clayton =

American vaudeville performer (1890–1950)

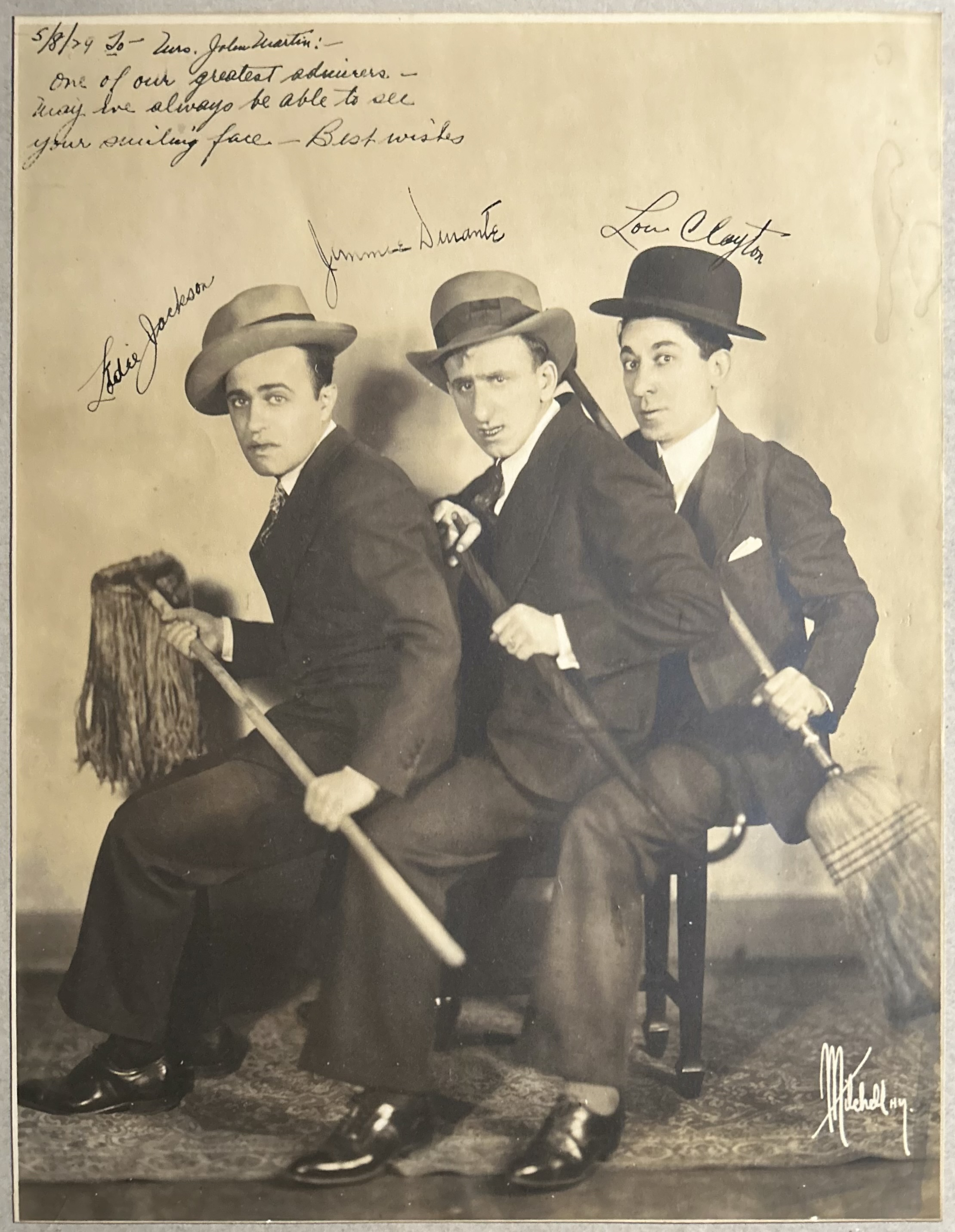
- Eddie Jackson Jimmy Durante Lou Clayton
- Born: Louis Finkelstein; March 12, 1890; Brooklyn, New York, U.S.
- Died: September 12, 1950 (aged 60); Santa Monica, California, U.S.

Lou Clayton (also Lew Clayton, born Louis Finkelstein; 1890-1950) was an American song-and-dance vaudeville performer, best known for his teaming with Jimmy Durante and Eddie Jackson, as Clayton, Jackson, and Durante, or "The Three Sawdust Bums". Before meeting Durante, by January 1921 Clayton and Cliff Edwards, working as a duo, had already achieved the most coveted booking in all of vaudeville, appearing as the headliners at the Palace Theater in Times Square. He'd also appeared in Broadway shows as early as 1916, billed as a single and as "Clayton & White".

Clayton met Durante and Jackson at their speakeasy, the Club Durant, in early 1923. Clayton became their business partners, writing and performing songs while running the club. After the very popular Club Durant was padlocked by the police for liquor violations and closed, they opened the similar Club Dover and took their show to other nightclubs such as the Rendezvous Club, owned by Gandolfo "Frankie Marlow" Curto. There Clayton was the first to hire a young singer, Ethel Zimmermann, later known as Ethel Merman.

The trio made their vaudeville debut at Loew's State on Broadway in March 1927, with an act that literally included breaking up furniture. By April 1928 they were headlining at the Palace, breaking the house record for receipts, and making $5500 a week. This led to a tour and bookings in Broadway shows; i.e., Ziegfeld's Show Girl in 1929, and Cole Porter's The New Yorkers the following year.

Clayton's only known film appearance is the 1930 Roadhouse Nights. The focus gradually shifted to Durante as a single act, and Clayton became his partner and longtime manager. He is interred at the Home of Peace Cemetery in East Los Angeles.
