= Eddie Jackson (vaudeville) =

American performer (1896–1980)

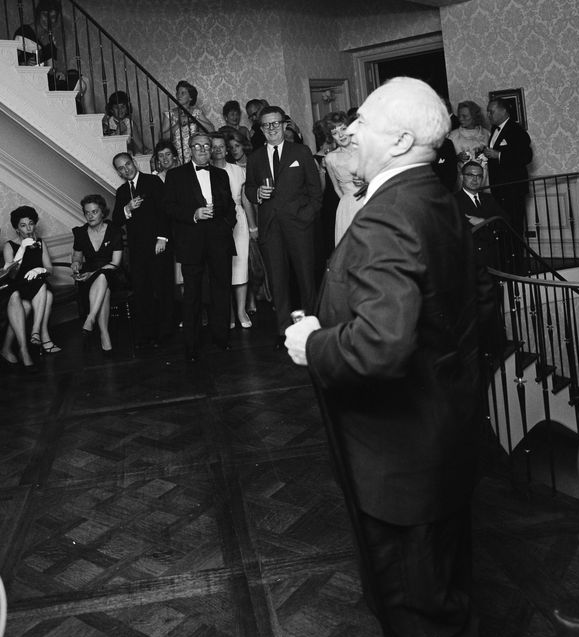
- Jackson performing in 1962
- Born: February 19, 1896
- Died: July 16, 1980 (aged 84)

Edward Jackson (February 19, 1896 – July 16, 1980) was an American leading vaudeville performer, actor and musician, and longtime colleague and partner of Jimmy Durante. He appeared in vaudeville with Durante and Lou Clayton as the team Clayton, Jackson & Durante, known as the "Three Sawdust Bums."

Born in Brooklyn, New York, Jackson began his show business work as a singing waiter at New York City and Coney Island clubs. At the Alamo Club in Harlem, he met Durante. They played together in a number of clubs and opened Club Durant in 1923. In 1924, their act was joined by Lou Clayton. The trio made their vaudeville debut at Loew's State theater in March 1927, with an act that literally included breaking up furniture. Durante sang of the virtues of wood, while Clayton and Jackson grabbed wood items and smashed them on the stage. By April 1928 they were headlining at the Palace Theater, breaking the house record for receipts, and making $5500 a week. They then moved to Broadway, appearing in the Ziegfeld production, Show Girl in 1929 and in Cole Porter's The New Yorkers in 1930. Jackson was known for his rousing rendition of "Won't You Come Home Bill Bailey" and for a dance step called the Strut. He also sang in three films in the late 1940s: In the Good Old Summertime, Two Sisters from Boston, and Music for Millions.

The trio broke up in 1931, though they did perform together in later years. Jackson remained Durante's sidekick and often performed with him in clubs and on television until 1971. His television and film performances include All Star Revue (1950), The Jimmy Durante Show (1954) and Roadhouse Nights (1930). Jackson also recorded Dixieland jazz. Jackson died within six months of Durante's death, on July 16, 1980, in Sherman Oaks, California.

== Recordings ==
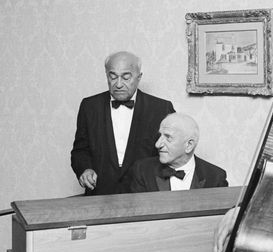
Jackson and Durante, 1962

- Eddie Jackson! and his Dixielanders, Audio Fidelity AFLP 1909 (1959)
