= Hello Young Lovers =

Hello Young Lovers may refer to:

- "Hello, Young Lovers" (song), a 1951 song by Rodgers and Hammerstein
- Hello Young Lovers (Nancy Wilson album), 1962
- Hello Young Lovers (Jimmy Durante album), 1965
- Hello Young Lovers (Sparks album), a 2006 album by Sparks
- Hello Young Lovers, a 1987 compilation album by Frank Sinatra
- "Hello Young Lovers" (Rising Damp), a 1978 television episode
