= One of Those Songs =

Studio album by Jimmy Durante
- Released: 1966
- Recorded: 1966
- Genre: Traditional pop
- Length: 26:05
- Label: Warner Bros. 1655
- Producer: Dick Glasser, Jimmy Hilliard

Jimmy Durante chronology
| Jimmy Durante's Way of Life... (1965) | One of Those Songs (1966) | Songs for Sunday (1967) |

Jackie Barnett Presents One of Those Songs is a 1966 album by Jimmy Durante, with arrangements by Ernie Freeman. The cover depicts Durante embracing CeCe, his adopted daughter with his second wife, Margie. The song "Margie" is dedicated to his wife.

Durante's musical partner Eddie Jackson accompanies him on "Bill Bailey (Won't You Please Come Home)".

== Track listing ==
1. "One of Those Songs" – 2:52
2. "You're Nobody till Somebody Loves You" (Russ Morgan, Larry Stock, James Cavanaugh) – 2:25
3. "Bill Bailey (Won't You Please Come Home)" (Hughie Cannon) – 2:30
4. "What Became of Life" – 3:00
5. "Margie" – 2:40
6. "Old Man Time" (Cliff Friend) – 2:30
7. "We're Going U.F.O.-ing" – 2:25
8. "Daddy (Your Mama Is Lonesome For You)" (Jimmy Durante, Chris Smith, Bob Schafer) – 1:40
9. "This Train" – 2:40
10. "Mame" – 2:25

== Personnel ==
- Jimmy Durante – vocals
- Eddie Jackson – vocals on "Bill Bailey (Won't You Please Come Home)"
- Ernie Freeman – arranger, conductor
- Ed Thrasher – art direction
- Otto Storch – cover photography
- Dick Glasser, Jimmy Hilliard – producer
