= Kiss Her Now =

1968 show tune written by Jerry Herman

Song by Angela Lansbury

from the album Dear World (original Broadway cast recording)
- Published: 1968 by Jerycho, ASCAP
- Released: 1968; 1969
- Label: Columbia Records
- Songwriter: Jerry Herman

"Kiss Her Now" is a 1968 show tune written by Jerry Herman for the 1969 Broadway musical Dear World. It was most notably performed by Ed Ames, who released it as a single in late 1968 for his album The Hits of Broadway and Hollywood. His version reached the US adult-oriented and pop charts and received a positive reception. The version sung by Angela Lansbury from the musical appeared in the original cast recording. It was listed among the better songs on it by reviewers.

== Background, content, and original recording ==
"Kiss Her Now" was written by Jerry Herman for the musical Dear World, first scheduled to open in December 1968. The show opened on Broadway on February 6, 1969, after several delays, but only ran for about six months. In the show, the song is sung by the Countess, assessed as an "urgent exhortation" for characters Nina and Jullian in the subplot with the opening lines:

Before you half remember what her smile was like,
Before you half recall the day you found her
Kiss her now, while she's young,
Kiss her now, while she's yours,
Kiss her now, while she needs your arms around her.

In the original cast soundtrack recorded at Mark Hellinger Theatre, New York City, "Kiss Her Now" was performed by Angela Lansbury (the Countess) again, and was picked as a highlight in Cashbox magazine's review of the album. Promotion for it and other songs from Dear World and Promises, Promises was handled by Edwin H. Morris, who hired several additional promoters. By December 1968, Dear World had about 18 separate recordings, with the only charting one being "Kiss Her Now" by Ed Ames.

== Ed Ames version ==
"Kiss Her Now"

Single by Ed Ames

from the album The Hits of Broadway and Hollywood
- B-side: "Gloves, Pictures, Dreams (Doors, Mirrors and Heartaches)"
- Released: October 1968
- Studio: RCA's Music Center of the World, Hollywood, California
- Genre: Pop; easy listening
- Length: 2:11
- Label: RCA Victor Records
- Songwriter: Jerry Herman
- Producer: Jim Foglesong

Ed Ames singles chronology
"All My Love's Laughter" (1968)	"Kiss Her Now" (1968)	"Changing, Changing" (1969)

=== Background and release ===
American singer Ed Ames enjoyed brief pop success in 1967 and 1968, charting several songs in the top-40 of charts. In late 1968 Ames chose another show tune for a single release, like his big hit "My Cup Runneth Over" two years earlier. The single was produced by Jim Foglesong, and arranged by Perry Botkin Jr. on both sides. The B-side was assessed by critics as a "more youth-minded" song, titled "Gloves, Pictures, Dreams (Doors, Mirrors and Heartaches)". "Kiss Her Now" was included in his concurrently released album, The Hits of Broadway and Hollywood, with songs in a similar style. The following year, it was included in his The Best of Ed Ames compilation.

=== Critical reception ===
Professional ratings
Review scores
Source	Rating
Record World	Positive (Singles Pick of the Week)
Billboard	Positive (Spotlight)
Cashbox	Positive (Pick of the Week)

The single received a positive critical reception upon its release. Billboard magazine stated that "...comes a poignant ballad performed to perfection by Ames in a top production arrangement with much commercial appeal." Cashbox stated that "Ames does a stunning job on a lovely song from Jerry Herman's new theater effort," adding that "Song is a wonderfully tender one with lyrics and arrangements that should gain attention with easy listening & middle-of-the-road outlets." Record World's editors picked the release as one of the "Singles of the Week", noting that Ames introduces the new ballad.

=== Chart performance ===
==== Adult-oriented charts ====
"Kiss Her Now" became an easy-listening success. It entered the Billboard Easy Listening chart in the issue dated November 9, 1968, reaching number 22 during a four-week run on it. The track debuted on the Record World Top-Non Rock chart in the issue dated November 16, 1968, peaking at a higher number 17 during a three-week run.

==== Pop-oriented charts ====
The single made short appearances on the pop charts as well. "Kiss Her Now" reached No. 77 on the Cashbox Top 100 Singles chart during its five-week run there. It peaked at No. 80 on the Record World 100 Top Pops chart during a four-week run on it. In Canada, the song managed to climb to No. 65 on the RPM Singles chart.

=== Track listing ===
7" single (Victor 47-9647, 1968)
No.	Title	Writer(s)	Length
1.	"Kiss Her Now"	Jerry Herman	2:11
2.	"Gloves, Pictures, Dreams (Doors, Mirrors and Heartaches)"	Earl Shuman, Leon Carr	3:09

== Charts ==
Chart performance for "Kiss Her Now" by Ames
Chart (1968)	Peak position
US Billboard Easy Listening	22
US Record World Top-Non Rock	17
US Record World 100 Top Pops	80
US Cashbox Top 100 Singles	77
Canada RPM Top 100 Singles	65
