= Roadhouse Nights =

1930 film

- Directed by: Hobart Henley
- Written by: Ben Hecht (story); Garret Fort
- Produced by: Walter Wanger
- Starring: Helen Morgan; Charles Ruggles; Fred Kohler; Jimmy Durante
- Cinematography: William O. Steiner
- Edited by: Helene Turner
- Distributed by: Paramount Pictures
- Release date: February 23, 1930
- Running time: 68 minutes
- Country: United States
- Language: English

Roadhouse Nights is a 1930 American pre-Code gangster film. A number of sources including Sally Cline in her book Dashiell Hammett Man of Mystery claim it is based on the novel Red Harvest written by Dashiell Hammett (author of The Maltese Falcon, The Thin Man, and The Glass Key). However the credits of the film itself say only "An Original Screenplay by Ben Hecht." Hammett receives no mention at all (and the plots are not similar).

The movie, an amalgam of musical comedy and gangster melodrama, was directed by Hobart Henley, stars Helen Morgan, Charles Ruggles, and Fred Kohler, and features a rare screen musical comedy performance by Jimmy Durante, in his screen debut, with his vaudeville partners Lou Clayton and Eddie Jackson ("Clayton, Jackson, and Durante"). Helen Morgan also sings It Can't Go On Like This, by Jay Gorney and Yip Harburg.

== Plot ==
Lola is a nitery chanteuse's whose gangster bosses head a murderous bootleg operation. Willie is a news reporter pretending to be an inveterate drinker. He frequents Lola's club, his phony drunkenness a cover for his investigation of the bootleg ring.

== Cast ==
- Helen Morgan as Lola Fagan
- Charles Ruggles as Willie Bindbugel
- Fred Kohler as Sam Horner
- Jimmy Durante as Daffy
- Leo Donnelly as City Editor
- Tammany Young as Jerry
- Joe King as Hanson
- Lou Clayton as Joe
- Eddie Jackson as Moe
- Fuller Mellish Jr. as Hogan

== Production ==
Filmed at Paramount's Astoria Studios in Astoria, Long Island, Roadhouse Nights is typical pre-Code Prohibition-era entertainment, with a reasonably "straight" performance from comic actor Ruggles and a few songs from Helen Morgan.
