= Jimmy Durante's Way of Life... =

Studio album by Jimmy Durante
- Released: 1964
- Recorded: 1964
- Genre: Traditional pop, vocal jazz
- Length: 26:51
- Label: Warner Bros.
- Producer: Jimmy Hillard

Jimmy Durante chronology
Hello Young Lovers (1964)	Jimmy Durante's Way of Life... (1964)	One of Those Songs (1966)

Professional ratings
Review scores
Source	Rating
Allmusic	4/5 stars
Billboard	Positive

Jackie Barnett Presents Jimmy Durante's Way of Life... with the Gordon Jenkins Orchestra and Chorus is a 1964 studio album by Jimmy Durante, arranged by Gordon Jenkins. It received a "Pop Special Merit" designation from Billboard upon its release, indicating "new releases of outstanding merit which deserve exposure and which could have commercial success within their respective categories of music".

Two songs from the album, "As Time Goes By" and "Make Someone Happy", were used in the soundtrack for the 1993 film Sleepless in Seattle.

== Track listing ==
Side 1
No.	Title	Writer(s)	Length
1.	"A Way of Life"	Sammy Fain, Jackie Barnett	3:06
2.	"My Wish"	Meredith Willson	2:24
3.	"As Time Goes By"	Herman Hupfeld	2:25
4.	"Make Someone Happy"	Betty Comden, Adolph Green, Jule Styne	1:51
5.	"I'll Be Seeing You"	Irving Kahal, Sammy Fain	3:10

Side 2
No.	Title	Writer(s)	Length
1.	"When Day Is Done"	Buddy DeSylva, Robert Katscher	2:30
2.	"When I Lost You"	Irving Berlin	2:56
3.	"If I Had You"	Ted Shapiro, James Campbell, Reginald Connelly	2:40
4.	"Once to Every Heart"	Gordon Jenkins	2:52
5.	"I'll See You in My Dreams"	Isham Jones, Gus Kahn	2:57

== Personnel ==
- Jimmy Durante – vocals
- Gordon Jenkins – conductor, arranger
