= Show Girl (1929 musical) =

1929 musical by William Anthony McGuire

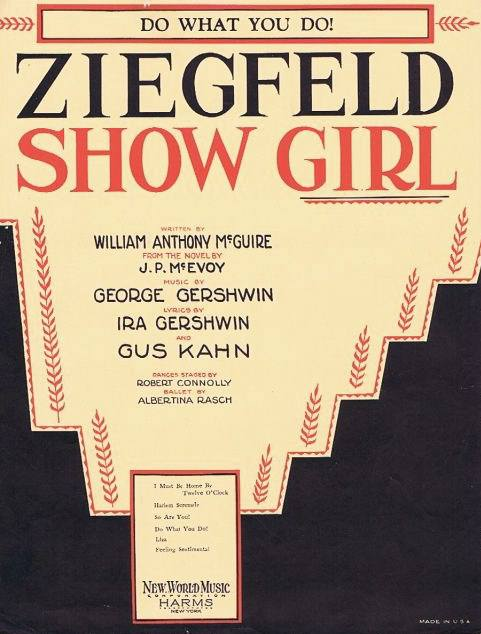
Sheet music cover for Show Girl

Show Girl is a musical with music by George Gershwin, lyrics by Ira Gershwin and Gus Kahn, and a book William Anthony McGuire. It ran at Broadway's Ziegfeld Theatre from Jul 2, 1929 to Oct 5, 1929. A backstage musical, much of the action of the musical's story takes place at the Ziegfeld Theatre in New York City. Other scenes take place in Trenton, New Jersey; Brooklyn; and at a Penthouse apartment in New York City. The show tells the story of aspiring showgirl Dixie Dugan (played by Ruby Keeler) as she is pursued by four suitors (played by Eddie Foy, Jr., Joseph Macauley, Austin Fairman, and Frank McHugh).

The character of Dixie Dugan was created by J. P. McEvoy and was first introduced in Liberty before McEvoy published his 1928 novel Show Girl (on which the musical was loosely based).

The Broadway production was produced by Florenz Ziegfeld, directed by McGuire, and choreographed by Bobby Connolly, with ballet sequences—including one set to An American in Paris—by Albertina Rasch. Duke Ellington conducted the orchestra. The show opened on July 2, 1929 at the Ziegfeld Theatre and ran for 111 performances. The cast included Ruby Keeler as Dixie (replaced by Dorothy Stone a few weeks into the run), Jimmy Durante, Eddie Foy, Jr., Frank McHugh, and Nick Lucas.

Keeler's husband, Al Jolson, frequently sat in the audience and serenaded her with the show's closing number, "Liza (All the Clouds'll Roll Away)", from his seat. The song was featured in the 1946 biopic The Jolson Story.

Ruby Keeler appeared for only the first few weeks of the New York run. By the end of July, she had to withdraw due to illness—receiving necessary surgery—and Dorothy Stone took over the role, actually appearing for about twice as many performances as Keeler.

Warner Brothers had already filmed the McEvoy story as Show Girl (1928), with Alice White as Dixie Dugan; a sequel, Showgirl in Hollywood (1930) was made with White again starring as Dixie.

== Cast ==
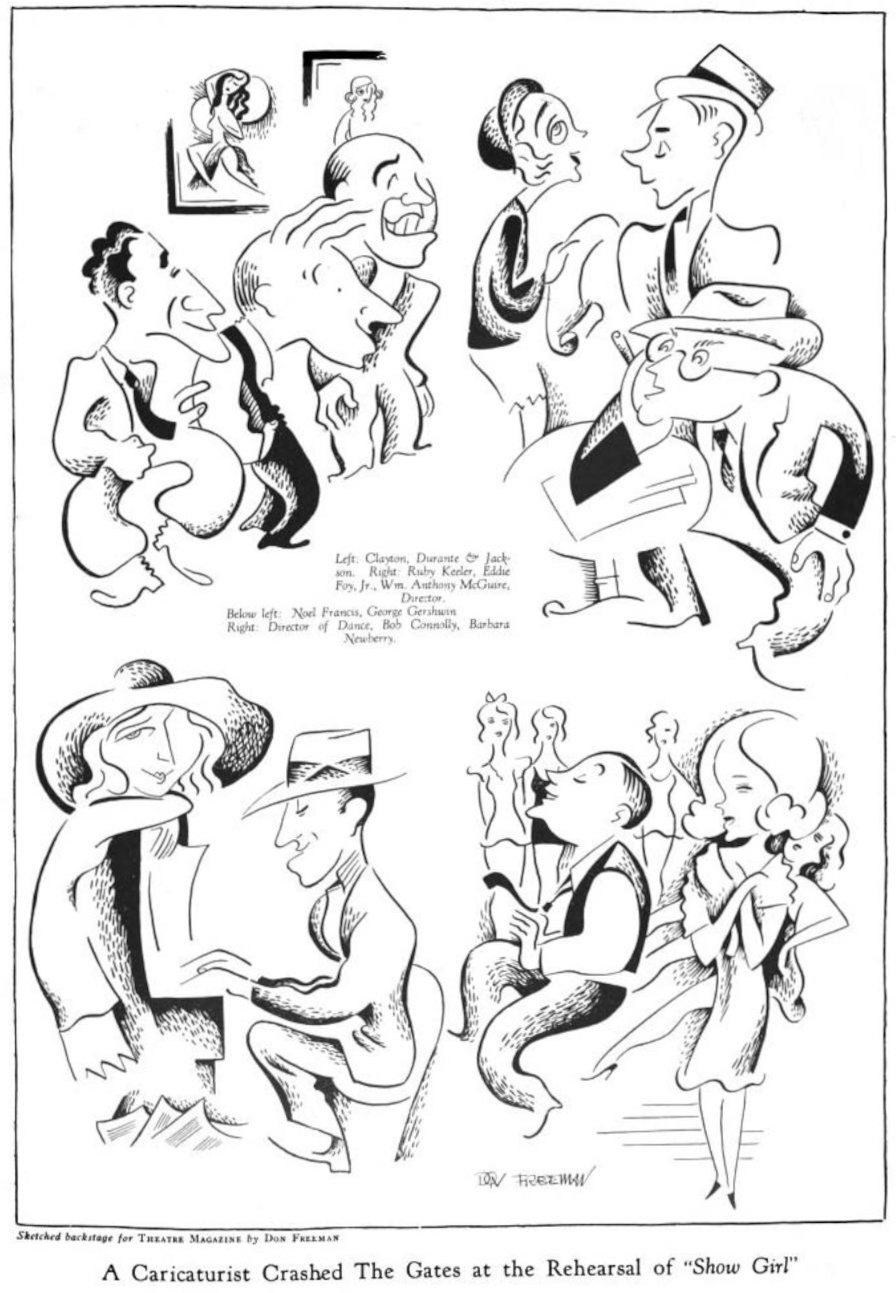
Caricatures of the cast by Don Freeman

- Doris Carson - Raquel
- Lew Clayton - Gypsy
- Sadie Duff - Mrs. Dugan
- Austin Fairman - John Milton
- Eddie Foy, Jr. - Denny Kerrigan
- Noel Francis - Peggy Ritz
- Kathryn Hereford - Bobby
- Ruby Keeler - Dixie Dugan
- Nick Lucas - Rudy
- Joseph Macauley - Alvarez Romano
- Frank McHugh - Jimmy Doyle
- Howard Morgan - Matt Brown
- Barbara Newberry - "Sunshine' and "Virginia Witherby"
- Matthew Smith - Captain Robert Adams

== Song list ==
=== Act One ===
- "Happy Birthday"
- "My Sunday Fella"
- "How Could I Forget?"
- "Can Broadway Do Without Me?" (music and lyrics by Jimmy Durante)
- "Lolita (My Love)"
- "Do What You Do"
- "Spain"
- "One Man"
- "So Are You"
- "I Must Be Home by Twelve O'Clock"
- "Because They All Love You" (Lyrics by Thomas Malie, music by J. Little)
- "Who Will be With You When I Am Far Away?" (Music and lyrics By W. H. Farrell)
- "Black and White"
- "Jimmie, the Well-Dressed Man" (music and lyrics by Jimmy Durante)
- "Harlem Serenade"

=== Act Two ===
- "An American in Paris"
- "Home Blues"
- "Broadway, My Street" (lyrics by Sidney Skolsky, music by Jimmy Durante)
- "(So) I Ups to Him" (music and lyrics by Jimmy Durante)
- "Follow the Minstrel Band"
- "Liza (All the Clouds'll Roll Away)"

Several further songs were used during tryouts, including "Tonight's the Night," which later was used in Crazy for You.
