= Hello Young Lovers (Jimmy Durante album) =

Studio album by Jimmy Durante
- Released: Early 1964
- Recorded: 1964
- Studio: United Recording Studios, Las Vegas
- Genre: Traditional pop
- Label: Warner Bros. W1531 (M); W1531 (S)
- Producer: Jimmy Hilliard

Jimmy Durante chronology
September Song (1963)	Hello Young Lovers (1964)	Jimmy Durante's Way of Life... (1964)

Jackie Barnett Presents Hello Young Lovers is a 1964 album by Jimmy Durante, with arrangements by Roy Bargy. Hello Young Lovers' was the last recording that Durante and Bargy would make together; Bargy had served as Durante's musical director since 1943.

The cover photography for the album was taken at the home of Wilbur Clark, the owner of the Desert Inn nightclub in Las Vegas.

Durante's rendition of "Smile" is featured in the film, and trailer for, Joker (2019).

== Chart performance ==
The album debuted on Cashbox magazine's Top 100 Albums chart in the issue dated February 15, 1964, peaking at No. 77 during a five-week run on the chart.

== Track listing ==
Side one
No.	Title	Writer(s)	Length
1.	"Hello Young Lovers"	Richard Rodgers, Oscar Hammerstein II	3:04
2.	"Try a Little Tenderness"	Jimmy Campbell, Reginald Connelly, Harry M. Woods	2.51
3.	"Smile"	Charlie Chaplin, Geoffrey Parsons, John Turner	2:55
4.	"Hi-Lili, Hi-Lo"	Helen Deutsch, Bronislaw Kaper	2:59
5.	"Love in a Home"	Gene De Paul, Johnny Mercer	2:57

Side two
No.	Title	Writer(s)	Length
1.	"This Is All I Ask"	Gordon Jenkins	3:04
2.	"The Glory of Love"	Billy Hill	2:48
3.	"You Can't Have Everything"	Mack Gordon, Harry Revel	2:41
4.	"In the Other Fellow's Yard"	Jackie Barnett, Jimmy Durante	2:28
5.	"The Time Is Now"	Charles Aznavour	3:14

== Personnel ==
- Jimmy Durante – vocals
- The John Rarig Singers
- Roy Bargy – arranger, conductor
- Jimmy Hilliard – producer

== Charts ==
Chart (1964)	Peak position
US Cashbox Top 100 Albums	77

== Bibliography ==
- Bakish, David (1995). Jimmy Durante: His Show Business Career, with an Annotated Filmography and Discography. New York: McFarland. ISBN 978-0-89950-968-6.
