= The New Yorkers =

1930 musical by Cole Porter and Herbert Fields

- Original Broadway program
- Music: Cole Porter
- Lyrics: Cole Porter
- Book: Herbert Fields
- Productions: 1930 Broadway; 1996 Lincolnshire, IL; 2017 City Center Encores!

The New Yorkers is a musical with score by Cole Porter and book by Herbert Fields that satirizes New York City types during Prohibition, from high society matrons to con men, bootleggers, thieves, and prostitutes. The musical premiered on Broadway in 1930, based on a story by E. Ray Goetz and Peter Arno, cartoonist for The New Yorker magazine. Star Jimmy Durante contributed additional songs to feature his character. The original Broadway production received mostly positive reviews and ran for 168 performances.

The musical introduced "Love for Sale", one of Porter's most notable songs, which was banned from radio broadcast for its frank lyrics concerning prostitution.

== History ==
The musical was "built to order around star comic Jimmy Durante, indisputably featured special material (songs as well as bits) that wouldn't scan without Schnozzola himself delivering it." Durante himself wrote five additional songs to highlight his performing talents.

Ray Goetz, who was the producer of the show as well as production supervisor, wanted to help audiences forget the Great Depression and so made The New Yorkers "as bright and sparkly as possible-from the variegated costumes and the Arno settings to the large and dynamic cast...He also featured a young group that had never appeared on Broadway as the stage band for the show: Fred Waring and his Pennsylvanians." The clean-cut band sang as well as played instruments.

== Synopsis ==
Wealthy New York socialite Alice Wentworth has a romantic interlude with Al Spanish, a nightclub owner and bootlegger. During their time together, they escape from the police and go on many adventures. Jimmy Deegan and his buddies Ronald and Oscar aid in their escapades, invent a new alcoholic drink, murder Feet McGeehan and assist with the gangland wedding of Al and Alice, while offering tributes to money, wood, and "The Hot Patata". Jokes and songs about alcohol, and how far people will go to get it, such as "Drinking Song" and "Say It with Gin", reflect the musical's origin from the Prohibition period.

== Musical numbers ==
Music and lyrics by Cole Porter unless otherwise noted.

Act 1

- Go Into Your Dance – Mona Low, Lola McGee, and Toro Girls
- The Hot Patata (music and lyrics by Jimmy Durante) – Jimmie Deegan, Ronald Monahan, and Cyril Gregory
- Where Have You Been? – Al Spanish and Alice Wentworth
- Say It With Gin – Ensemble and Trainor Brothers
- Venice† – Alice Wentworth, Ronald Monahan, Jimmie Deegan, and Cyril Gregory
- Love for Sale – May and Three Girl Friends
- I'm Getting Myself Ready for You – Mona Low, James Livingston, Lola McGee, and Alfredo Gomez
- Drinking Song (music by Fred Waring, lyrics by Charles Henderson)–Waring's Pennsylvanians
- The Great Indoors – Mona Low and Girls
- Money (music and lyrics by Jimmy Durante) – Jimmie Deegan, Ronald Monahan, and Cyril Gregory
- Wood (music and lyrics by Jimmy Durante) – Jimmie Deegan, Ronald Monahan, Cyril Gregory, and Company

Act 2

- Sheikin Fool (music and lyrics by Jimmy Durante) – Jimmie Deegan, Ronald Monahan, and Cyril Gregory
- Let's Fly Away – James Livingston, Alice Wentworth, and Ensemble
- I Happen to Like New York – Mildew
- Let's Fly Away (Reprise) – James Livingston, Alice Wentworth, and Ensemble
- Sing Sing for Sing Sing – Al Spanish and Waring's Pennsylvanians
- Sing Sing for Sing Sing (Reprise) – Mona Low, Three Girl Friends, and Waring's Pennsylvanians
- Data (music and lyrics by Jimmy Durante) – Jimmie Deegan, Ronald Monahan, Cyril Gregory, and Waring's Pennsylvanians
- Sing Sing for Sing Sing (Reprise) – Waring's Pennsylvanians
- Take Me Back to Manhattan – Entire Company

†Music missing; Lyric partially lost;

== Productions ==
The New Yorkers began pre-Broadway tryouts at the Chestnut Street Opera House, Philadelphia on November 10, 1930 and then moved to the Shubert Theatre, Newark, New Jersey on November 24, 1930.

The musical opened as the first legitimate stage production at the refurbished Broadway Theatre on December 8, 1930, closing after 168 performances on May 2, 1931. Directed by Monty Woolley, with choreography by George Hale, special numbers were staged by Fred Waring, and the production supervised by E. Ray Goetz. Costumes were by Peter Arno and Charles Le Maire, and the set design was by Dale Stetson, based on sketches by Peter Arno. The conductor was Max Meth. The cast featured Frances Williams as the hostess Mona Low, Charles King as Al Spanish, Hope Williams as Alice Wentworth, Ann Pennington as Lola McGee, Marie Cahill as Gloria Wentworth, the Fred Waring Orchestra, Lou Clayton as Cyril Gregory, Eddie Jackson as Ronald Monahan, Jimmy Durante as Jimmie Deegan, Kathryn Crawford as May (later replaced by Elisabeth Welch), and Oscar Ragland as Mildew. (Clayton, Jackson & Durante were a successful vaudeville act.)

The musical was performed at the Marriott Theatre in Lincolnshire, Illinois in 1996. "Musicals Tonight!" presented the musical as a staged concert in April 2003 in New York City. The "Lost Musicals" series presented The New Yorkers at Sadler's Wells Theatre, London, in March and April 2009, starring Anna Francolini as Alice and Dawn Spence as Mona Low. The New York City Center presented it in March 2017 in its Encores! staged concert series with Tam Mutu as Al Spanish, Scarlett Strallen as Alice Wentworth, and Kevin Chamberlin as Jimmie Deegan, directed by John Rando.

== Response ==
Brooks Atkinson, theatre critic for The New York Times wrote that the musical "manages to pack most of the madness, ribaldry, bounce and comic loose ends of giddy Manhattan into a lively musical." As for Porter's songs, "most ... hold well to the average of song-and-dance scores."

The song "Love for Sale" was sung by an actress playing the role of a prostitute ("advertising young love for sale"). As recounted by Charles Schwartz in his biography Cole Porter, the critic for the World, Charles Darnton, "excoriated" the song and called it "in the worst possible taste." The song was subsequently banned from the radio.

The reviewer of the "Musicals Tonight!" 2003 concert noted that Peter Arno (who provided the story) was a cartoonist whose drawings appeared on the cover and pages of the magazine The New Yorker. "His subjects were jazz babies, society dames, gangsters, café habitues, with a specialization in the lusty and lustful. Herb Fields's book...is full of that kind of sexuality, with a heaping helping of puns and double (and triple) entendres."
