= September Song (album) =

Studio album by Jimmy Durante
- Released: 1963
- Recorded: 1963
- Genre: Traditional pop
- Length: 29:43
- Label: Warner Bros. 1506
- Producer: Jackie Barnett

Jimmy Durante chronology
Jimmy Durante at the Copacabana (1961)	September Song (1963)	Hello Young Lovers (1964)

September Song is a 1963 album by Jimmy Durante, with arrangements by Roy Bargy.

== Reception ==
Professional ratings
Review scores
Source	Rating
AllMusic	4/5 stars

The album was reviewed by Greg Adams for Allmusic who wrote that "Mixing Durante's utterly unique voice with lush strings and a vocal chorus, September Song is a left-field masterpiece full of wistful and affecting performances. Durante was by no means a technically accomplished vocalist, but he negotiated the sessions with aplomb and created a piece of work very different from, but just as charming as, the comedy that had made him a star".

== Chart performance ==
The album debuted on Billboard magazine's Top LP's chart in the issue dated September 21, 1963, peaking at No. 30 during a nineteen-week run on the chart. The album debuted on Cashbox magazine's Top 100 Albums chart in the issue dated August 31, 1963, peaking at No. 22 during a seventeen-week run on the chart. On the magazine's Top 50 Stereo chart the album peaked at No. 18 during an eleven-week run on the chart.

== Track listing ==
1. "September Song" (Kurt Weill, Maxwell Anderson)
2. "Look Ahead Little Girl" (Jackie Barnett, Sammy Fain)
3. "Count Your Blessings Instead of Sheep" (Irving Berlin)
4. "When the Circus Leaves Town" (Barnett, Jimmy Durante)
5. "I Believe" (Al Stillman, Ervin Drake, Irvin Graham, Jimmy Shirl)
6. "Young at Heart" (Carolyn Leigh, Johnny Richards)
7. "Don't Lose Your Sense of Humor" (Barnett, Durante)
8. "You'll Never Walk Alone" (Richard Rodgers, Oscar Hammerstein II)
9. "One Room Home" (Barnett, Durante)
10. "Blue Bird of Happiness" (Edward Heyman, Harry Parr Davies, Sandor Harmati)

== Personnel ==
- Jimmy Durante – vocals
- Roy Bargy – arranger, conductor
- Stan Cornyn – liner notes
- Jackie Barnett – producer

== Other media ==
"Young at Heart" was featured in the 1991 film City Slickers and also appears on the soundtrack album.

== Charts ==
Chart (1963)	Peak position
US Billboard Top LPs	30
US Cashbox Top 100 Albums	22
US Cashbox Top 50 Stereo	18

== Bibliography ==
- Bakish, David (1995). Jimmy Durante: His Show Business Career, with an Annotated Filmography and Discography. New York: McFarland. ISBN 978-0-89950-968-6.
