= Dear World (photography project) =

Portrait project by Robert X. Fogarty

Dear World is a portrait photography project founded in 2010 by Robert X Fogarty in New Orleans, Louisiana. The project photographs individuals who write messages on their bodies, creating a visual documentary format that has been used to document survivors of national tragedies, humanitarian crises, and community events. As explained by Fogarty, each subject in the project "writes the first line, or the lead, to a story only they can tell".

== History and projects ==
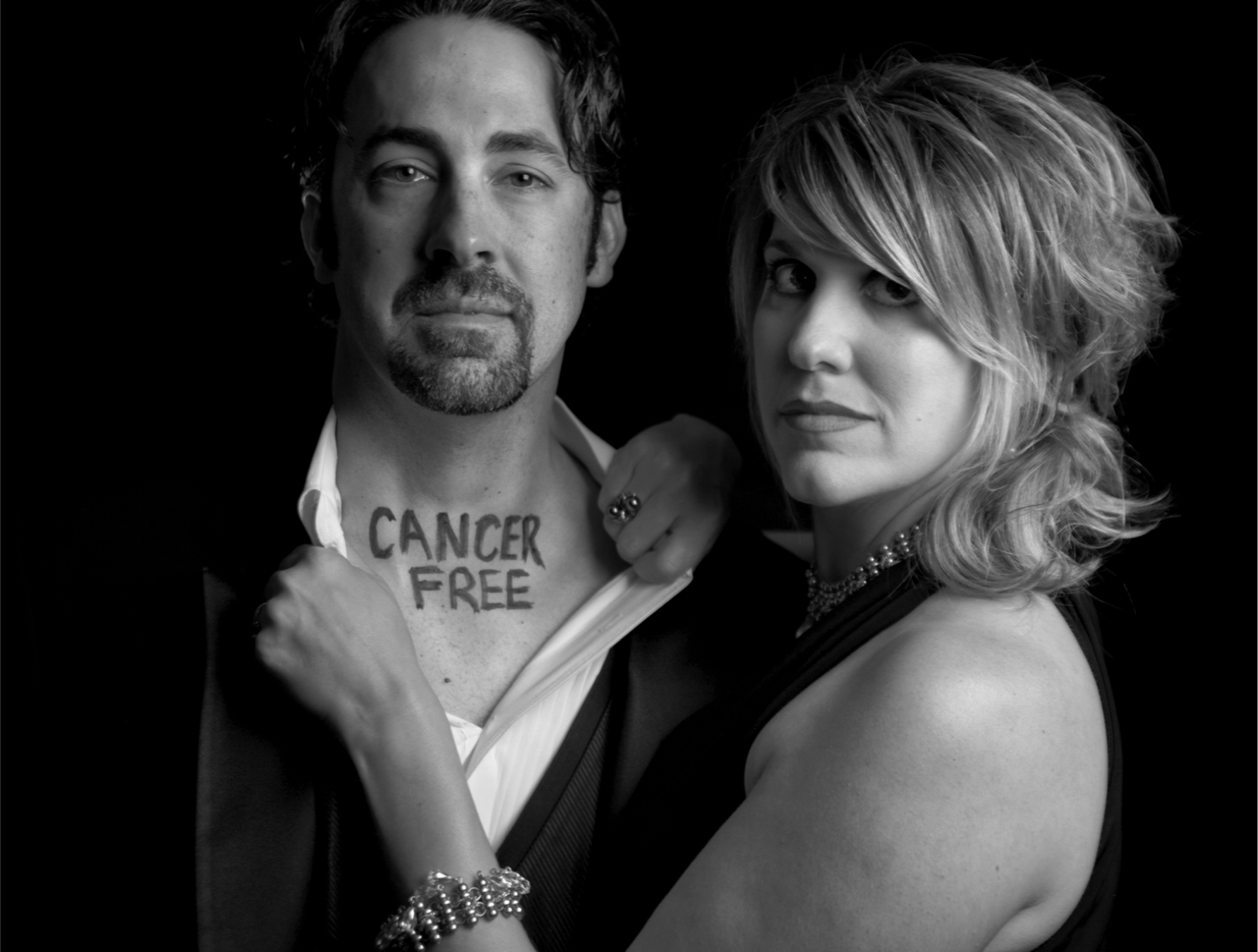
Cancer Free

Dear World began in 2010 in New Orleans following Hurricane Katrina. By 2013, the project had expanded beyond New Orleans, growing from Dear New Orleans into Dear World. According to Fogarty, the idea for the shift came out of one participant's decision to share a personal story instead of an homage to the city. "A man wrote 'cancer free' on his chest while everyone else was writing why they loved the city" Fogarty said. "It changed my life and the trajectory of the project."

That same year, Dear World photographed Syrian refugees in Lebanon, creating portraits with messages including "I want the life I had back" from an 11-year-old girl named Huda. The series was published by Radio Free Europe/Radio Liberty, The Independent, BuzzFeed News and L'Express. The following year, Dear World created a photo series titled "Boston Strong" featuring individuals affected by the Boston Marathon bombing. ABC News and USA Today published the photographs, which showed survivors and community members with messages including "You can scare me, but you can't stop me" and "Love is stronger than terror".

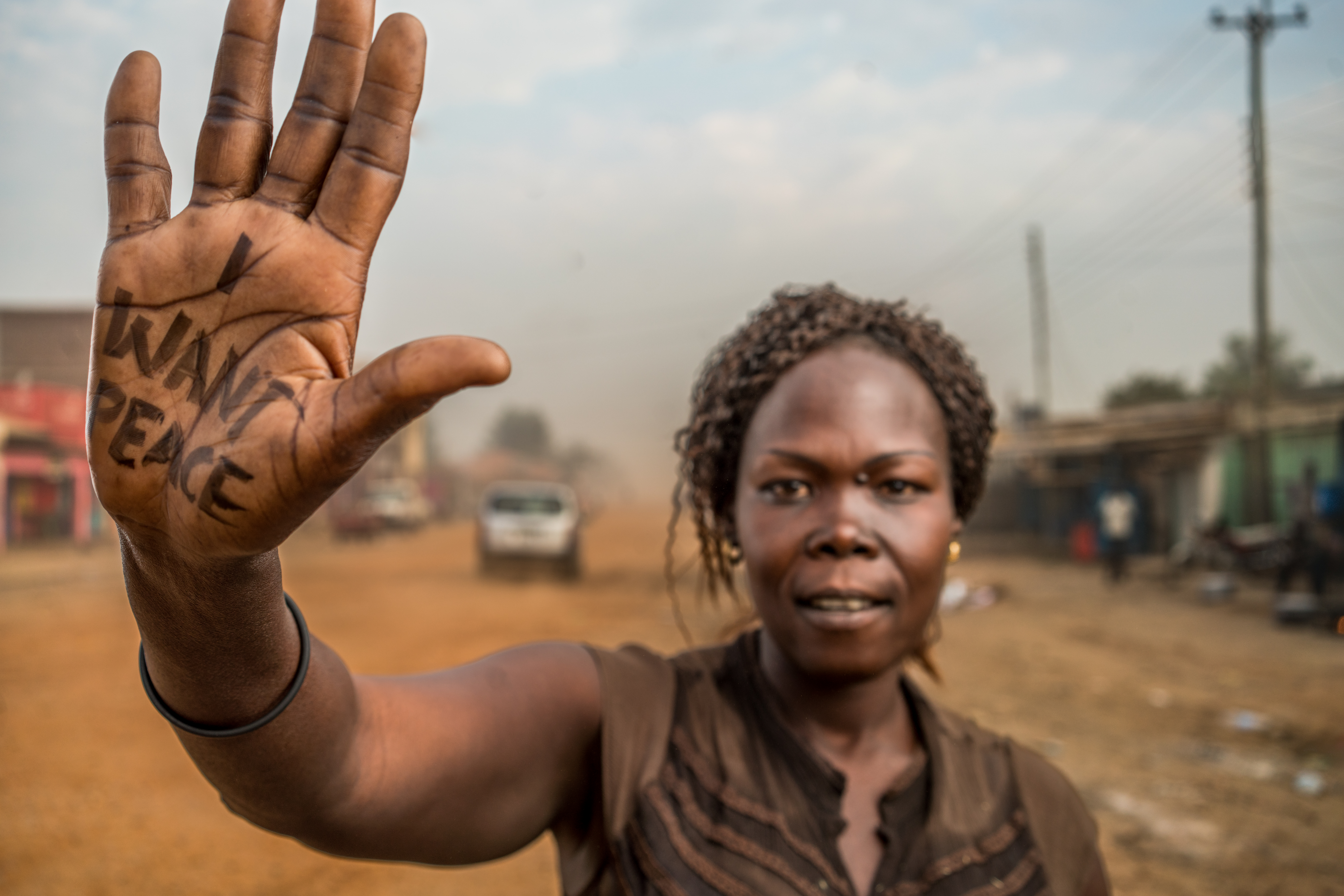
I Want Peace

Also in 2014, Dear World was used as part of a pre-season team-building initiative for the Duke University men's basketball program. During the session, players wrote personally meaningful words or phrases on their bodies and shared the stories behind them with teammates. Senior guard Quinn Cook described the experience as unusually revealing, stating, "People told people things they've never told anybody before." That season the team went on to win the 2014-15 NCAA men's national championship. In 2017, Dear World created a portrait series, published in USA Today and BuzzFeed News, with survivors, first responders and family members affected by the June 2016 Pulse nightclub shooting in Orlando, Florida. During the COVID-19 pandemic, Dear World created "Dear Nurses", a portrait series of healthcare workers in New Orleans in partnership with the New Orleans Saints. On the tenth anniversary of the Sandy Hook shooting, Dear World's memorial project was featured on MSNBC's The 11th Hour with Stephanie Ruhle.
