= Philip J. Lang =

American musical arranger, orchestrator and composer

Philip J. Lang (17 April 1911, in New York – 22 February 1986, in Branford, Connecticut) was an American musical arranger, orchestrator and composer of band music, as well as a musical educator. He is credited for writing the orchestral arrangements (orchestrations) for over 50 Broadway theatre shows, including many landmark productions, such as Li'l Abner (1956), Hello, Dolly! (1964), Mame (1966), George M (1968), Annie (1977) and 42nd Street (1980). Together with Robert Russell Bennett, he orchestrated the record-breaking productions of Lerner and Loewe's My Fair Lady (1956) and Camelot (1960). Russell Bennett, the dean of musical orchestrators, remarked that the original arrangements Lang had prepared for Annie Get Your Gun (1946), which utilized a modern technique of orchestral scoring, were beautifully done.

== Musical education ==
In 1933 Lang graduated from Ithaca College, which later awarded him an honorary doctorate for his career. He pursued further musical studies at Columbia University and the Juilliard School. By 1934 Lang had signed with the busy theatrical orchestration department at Chappell Music run by Max Dreyfus. There he was expected to be the principal orchestral arranger (orchestrator) for about five musical shows a year being produced on Broadway and also be expected to collaborate with his colleagues on shows assigned to them as needed. During the war years, Lang along with Robert Russell Bennett, Don Walker, and Ted Royal were recognized as the busiest orchestrators on Broadway.

== Annie Get Your Gun Score ==
An early assignment was the original orchestrations for Irving Berlin's Annie Get Your Gun, in which Lang employed the new so-called "microphone technique" where the singer would carry the melody line without much support or competition from the orchestra. He would later use this to excellent effect for Rex Harrison's speaking-singing on My Fair Lady, but belters like Ethel Merman expected full-bodied orchestral underpinnings. Producer Richard Rodgers and the musical director Jay Blackton wanted the more traditional "live theater" sound and asked Russell Bennett to redo it during the tryouts.

In his autobiography Bennett suggests that he merely adjusted Lang's work without unbalancing it; but others have claimed that Bennett rewrote practically everything and saved the show. Steven Suskin has confirmed that at least Lang's version of "Anything You Can Do" survived and was used in the final show, to which many other orchestrators eventually contributed. Nevertheless, Bennett apparently appreciated Lang's work and happily collaborated with him on a number of other successful scores.

== Band music ==
Throughout his career Lang was a prolific arranger for bands and would often serve as a guest conductor and adjudicator for school festivals and clinics. Representative of his transcriptions was the 1952 arrangement of Raymond Scott's March of the Slide Trombones.

He would also compose himself, such as the hoe-down toned The Country Bumpkin, prefiguring his hillbilly phase on Li'l Abner. Lang also served as a partner and editor at Lawson-Gould Music, Inc.

== Other credits ==
The Phil Lang Orchestra recorded 13 78 rpm selections of popular dance music for Brunswick Records in 1938–39. Morton Gould's "Tropical" and "Pavanne" were typical of the modernistic novelty style of the recordings, which are very rare today.

Apart from helping out on the film versions of Hello Dolly!, and Abner, Lang did little else for the movies. He was, however, a frequent musical arranger for prestige television programing, such as Hallmark Productions, David Susskind, Omnibus, Radio City Music Hall shows and The Tonight Show.

Starting in 1949, Lang became an associate professor of orchestration, often lecturing during the summer sessions. He mainly taught at the University of Michigan and the University of Colorado at Boulder. In 1950 he wrote the college textbook, Scoring for the Band, which was published by Mills Music, New York.

Later in his career Lang became popular as an orchestrator for ballet and opera, including the Metropolitan Opera and Ballet de Marseille, as well as the Boston Pops Orchestra.

In 1978, he supplied the music for Places, Please! a full-length musical-within-a-musical with a book and lyrics by Herb Martin. In 1979, he wrote the orchestrations for the stage adaption of the 1937 animated musical film Snow White and the Seven Dwarfs.

Lang's other significant orchestration credits include: Can-Can (1953), Take Me Along (1959), Redhead (1959), Carnival! (1961), Dear World (1969), Applause (1970), Mack and Mabel (1974), Goldilocks (with Leroy Anderson) (1958) and Norman Lear's 1968 film The Night They Raided Minsky's.
