= Jimmy Durante =

American comedian, actor, singer, and pianist (1893–1980)

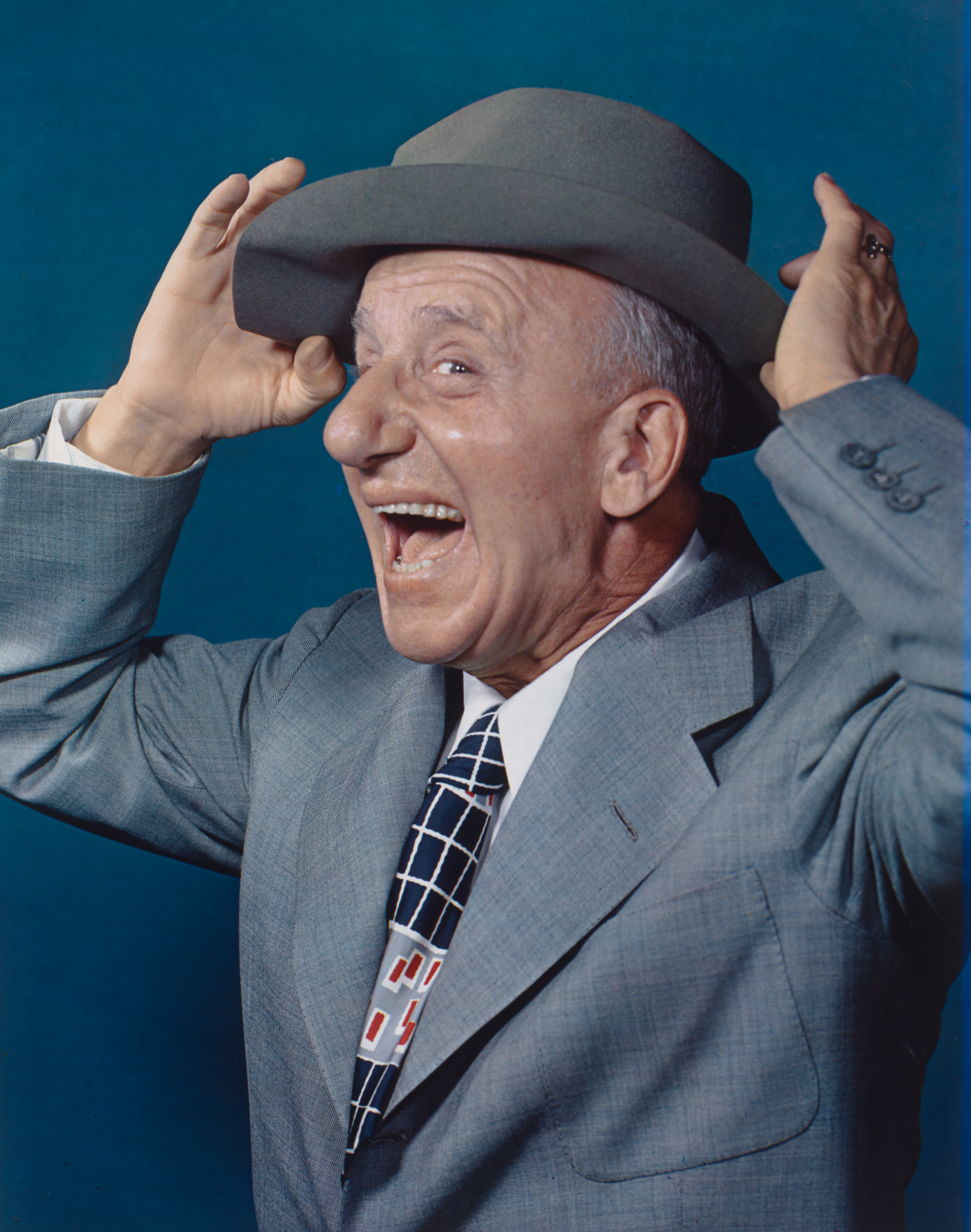
- Durante in 1948
- Born: James Francis Durante; February 10, 1893; New York City, U.S.
- Died: January 29, 1980 (aged 86); Santa Monica, California, U.S.
- Resting place: Holy Cross Cemetery, Culver City
- Other names: The Schnoz; The Great Schnozzola
- Occupations: Comedian; actor; singer; pianist
- Years active: 1910–1974
- Political party: Democratic
- Spouses: Jeanne Olsen (m. 1921; died 1943) Margie Little (m. 1960)
- Children: 1

James Francis Durante (/dəˈrænti/ də-RAN-tee, Italian: [duˈrante]; February 10, 1893 – January 29, 1980) was an American comedian, actor, singer, and pianist. His distinctive gravelly speech, Lower East Side accent, comic language-butchery, jazz-influenced songs, and prominent nose helped make him one of the United States' most familiar and popular personalities of the 1920s through the 1970s. He often referred to his nose as the schnozzola (Italianization of the American Yiddish slang word schnoz, meaning "big nose"), and the word became his nickname.

== Early life ==
=== Childhood ===
James Francis Durante was born on February 10, 1893, on the Lower East Side of Manhattan in New York City. He was the youngest of four children born to Rosa (née Lentino) and Bartolomeo Durante, both immigrants from Salerno, Campania, in Italy. Bartolomeo was a barber. Durante served as an altar boy at St. Malachy Church in Manhattan, located in the Theatre District.

=== Early career ===
Durante dropped out of school in seventh grade to become a full-time ragtime pianist. He played in piano bars under the name "Ragtime Jimmy". He later joined the Original New Orleans Jazz Band, one of the first jazz bands in New York City. Durante was the only band member who did not come from New Orleans, Louisiana. During their performances, he would break into a song to deliver a joke, with band or orchestra chord punctuation after each line. This musical treatment became a Durante trademark. In 1920, the group renamed itself as Jimmy Durante's Jazz Band.

== Stardom ==
By the mid-1920s, Durante had become a vaudeville star and radio personality, playing with Lou Clayton and Eddie Jackson. They called themselves Clayton, Jackson, and Durante. When the trio played the Palace Theater on Broadway in June 1928, Betty Felsen's production of Ballet Caprice headlined the bill. Clayton and Jackson remained Durante's close friends for life, frequently reuniting with him in performances in later years.

Jackson and Durante appeared in the Cole Porter musical The New Yorkers, which opened on Broadway on December 8, 1930. The two men played the sidekicks to a bootlegger and nightclub owner. Earlier in 1930, the two appeared in the film Roadhouse Nights, ostensibly based on Dashiell Hammett's novel Red Harvest.

By 1934, Durante had recorded a hit record with his novelty composition, "Inka Dinka Doo", with lyrics by Ben Ryan. It became his theme song for the rest of his life. A year later, Durante starred on Broadway in the Billy Rose stage musical Jumbo. At the end of each performance, Durante lay on the stage while a live elephant placed its foot on his head. Durante also appeared on Broadway in the musicals Show Girl (1929), Strike Me Pink (1934), and Red, Hot and Blue (1936).

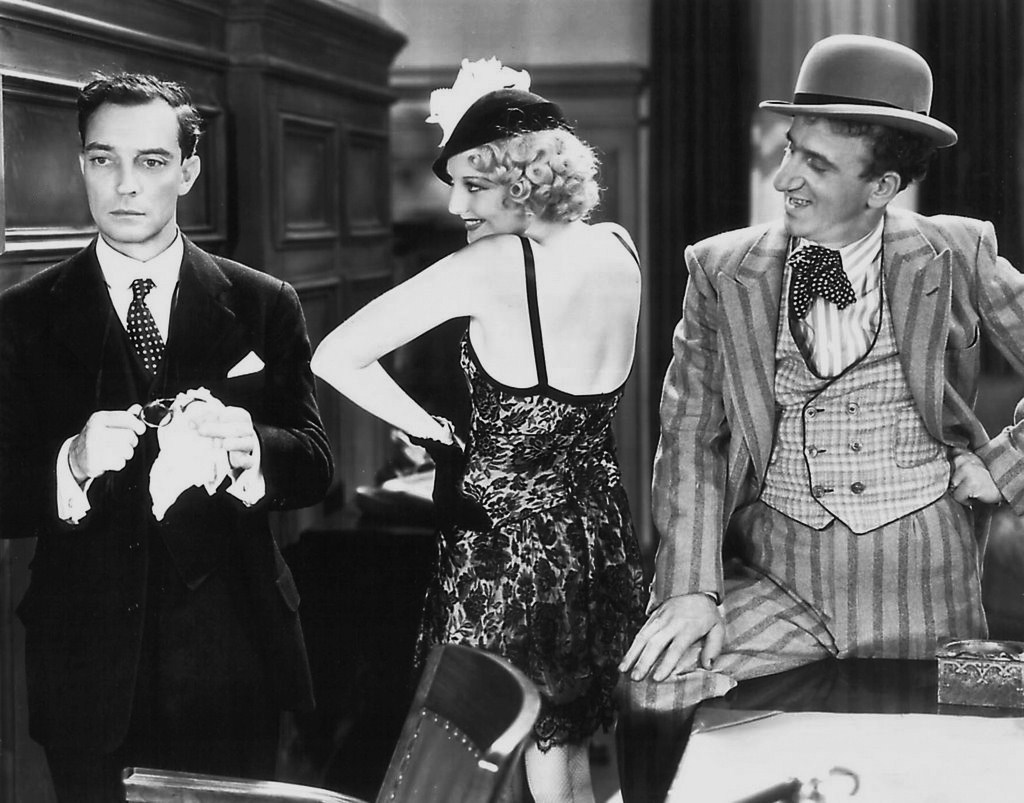
Buster Keaton, Thelma Todd, and Durante in Speak Easily (1932)

During the early 1930s, Durante alternated between Hollywood films and Broadway shows. One of his first films was The Phantom President (1932), a Paramount production starring George M. Cohan. Durante played "Curly Cooney", a gregarious sidekick to Cohan.

Durante then replaced Cliff Edwards as the comic foil in the Metro-Goldwyn-Mayer (MGM) and Buster Keaton comedies: Speak Easily (1932), The Passionate Plumber (1932), and What! No Beer? (1933). Although Durante's style of fast-talking comedy did not always mesh smoothly with Keaton's mimed visuals, the series proved successful. However, MGM ended the series after firing Keaton due to personal problems.

MGM then gave Durante lead roles in moderately budgeted comedies. In Meet the Baron, (1933), Durante plays "Joe McGoo", one of two bunglers rescued from a forest in Africa by Baron Munchausen. A second film was Hollywood Party (1934). Durante plays a Tarzan-like character searching for new lions for his act. Comedians Laurel and Hardy, as well as The Three Stooges, appear in the film. MGM released Durante from contract in 1934.

Durante went to England to work in a Richard Tauber film musical, Land Without Music (released in the United States as Forbidden Music). After returning to Hollywood, he was unable to find any movie roles. In 1937, Columbia Pictures finally offered him a role in its college musical Start Cheering. Durante played a comic sidekick in a story about a movie star going back to College. Durante received excellent critical notices, re-establishing him in films. From then on, he mainly appeared in strong supporting roles.

Durante played "Cornelius J. Courtney", a sidekick to Gene Autry, in the musical Western Melody Ranch (1940). He appeared in the comedy The Man Who Came to Dinner (1942), playing "Banjo", a character based on the comedian Harpo Marx. He appeared in the lavish musical comedy Ziegfeld Follies (1945), the musical (1950 film) the Milkman Billy Rose's Jumbo (1962), and the Cinerama comedy It's a Mad, Mad, Mad, Mad World (1963).

== Radio ==
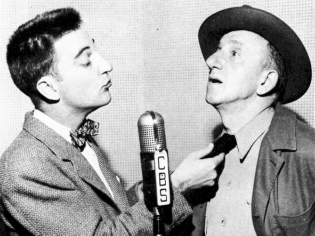
With Garry Moore in the Durante-Moore Show (1943–1947)

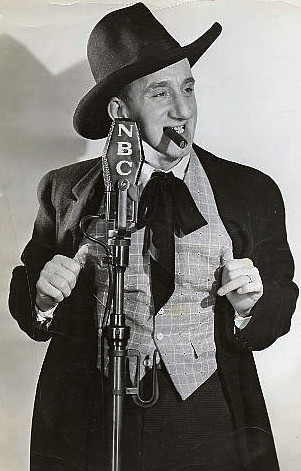
Durante on The Jumbo Fire Chief Program, 1935

On September 10, 1933, Durante appeared on the National Broadcasting Company (NBC) radio show, The Chase and Sanborn Hour, hosted by comedian Eddie Cantor through November 12th of that year. When Cantor left the show, Durante took over as host from April 22nd to September 30, 1934. He then moved on to The Jumbo Fire Chief Program on NBC (1935–1936).

Durante teamed with comedian Garry Moore for the Durante-Moore Show on NBC in March 1943. The show moved to the Columbia Broadcasting System (CBS) in October 1943. Durante's comic chemistry with the young, brush-cut Moore brought Durante an even larger audience. Durante's line "Dat's my boy dat said dat!" became an instant catchphrase, later inspiring the Hanna-Barbera cartoon series Augie Doggie and Doggie Daddy.

Durante and Moore were one of the top radio acts of the 1940s. In February 1945, during World War II, Durante starred with singer Dinah Shore on an episode of Command Performance, broadcast on the Armed Forces Radio Network to the American armed forces around the world.

Moore left the Durante-Moore Show in mid-1947; it continued as The Jimmy Durante Show for three more years. It featured a reunion of Clayton, Jackson, and Durante on his April 21, 1948, broadcast.

== Television ==
Durante first appeared on television in 1944. He made a surprise appearance that year on John Reed King's local audience participation show on WCBW (now WCBS-TV) in New York City. His brief, unannounced, appearance on The Missus Goes a-Shopping segment apparently surprised most of the staff, as well as the audience. Arrangements were made in the late afternoon for him to pop into camera range, which he did with the reported agility of a television veteran. Billboard Magazine reviewed the appearance:

"Without script, rehearsal, or make-up, he went on and gave a top performance, proving that a star of Durante's caliber shines in any entertainment medium. Aware of camera angle importance, Schnozzle played his profile for all its irregularity. His ad libbing was fast and funny; his singing and playing, abetted by stooge Eddie Jackson, terrif".

From 1950 to 1951, Durante was the host once a month on the NBC's comedy-variety series Four Star Revue. Durante continued with the show until 1954. He then hosted a half-hour variety show, The Jimmy Durante Show, on NBC from October 2, 1954, to June 23, 1956.

Beginning in the early 1950s, Durante teamed with the singer Sonny King, a collaboration that continued until Durante's death. Several times in the 1960s, Durante served as host of the American Broadcasting Company (ABC) variety hour The Hollywood Palace, which was taped live (and consequently included ad-libs by the seasoned vaudevillian). Durante's final regular television series paired him with the Lennon Sisters and was titled Jimmy Durante Presents the Lennon Sisters. The series lasted for one season on ABC (1969–1970).

== Marriages ==
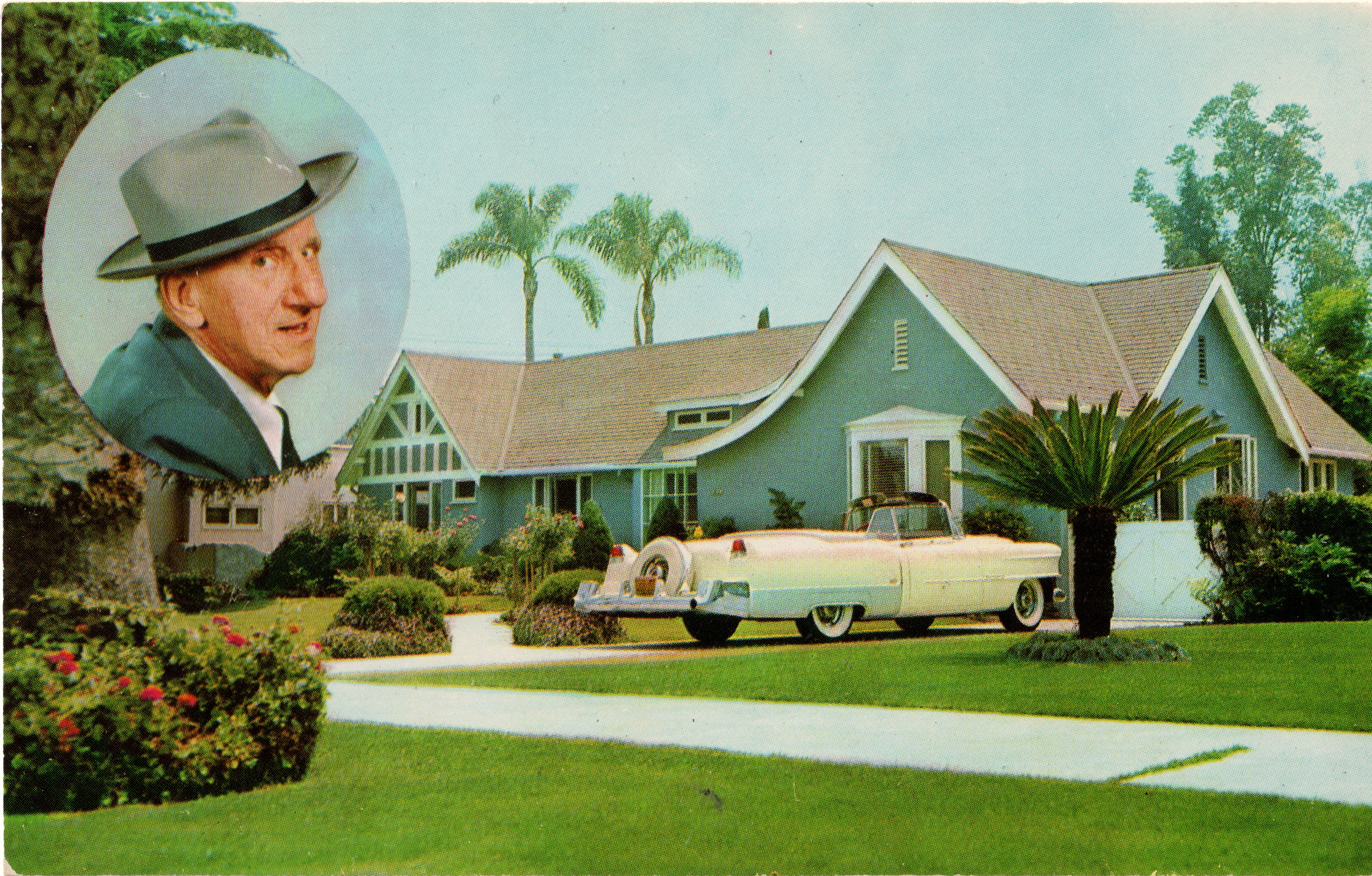
Residence of Jimmy Durante, Beverly Hills, California

Durante's first wife was Jean "Jeanne" Olson, whom he married on June 19, 1921. She was born in Ohio on August 31, 1896. She was 46 years old when she died on February 14, 1943, after a lingering heart ailment of about two years, although different newspaper accounts of her death suggest she was 45 or perhaps 52. As her death was sudden, Durante was touring in New York at the time. He immediately returned to Los Angeles to complete the funeral arrangements.

Durante's radio show was bracketed with two trademark phrases: "Inka Dinka Doo" as his opening theme, and the invariable signoff that became another familiar national catchphrase: "Good night, Mrs. Calabash, wherever you are." For years, no one knew to whom Mrs. Calabash referred, and Durante preferred to keep the mystery alive until 1966. One theory was that it referred to the owner of a restaurant in Calabash, North Carolina, where Durante and his troupe had stopped to eat. He was so taken by the food, the service, and the chitchat that he told the owner that he would make her famous. Since he did not know her name, he referred to her as "Mrs. Calabash". At a National Press Club meeting in 1966 (broadcast on NBC's Monitor program), Durante finally revealed that it was indeed a tribute to his wife. While driving across the country, they stopped in Calabash, a name she had loved. "Mrs. Calabash" became his pet name for her, and he signed off his radio program with "Good night, Mrs. Calabash." He added "wherever you are" after the first year.

Durante married his second wife, Margaret "Margie" Little, at St. Malachy Roman Catholic Church in New York City on December 14, 1960. As a teenager, she had been crowned queen of the New Jersey State Fair. She attended New York University before being hired by the legendary Copacabana in New York City. Durante and she met there 16 years before their marriage, when he performed there and she was a hatcheck girl. She was 41 and he was 67 when they married. With help from their attorney, Mary G. Rogan, the couple were able to adopt a baby, Cecilia Alicia (nicknamed CeCe and now known as CeCe Durante-Bloum), on Christmas Day, 1961. CeCe became a champion horsewoman and then a horse trainer and riding instructor. Margie died on June 7, 2009, at the age of 89.

== Charitable work ==
On August 15, 1958, for his charitable acts, Durante was awarded a three-foot-high brass loving cup by the Al Bahr Shriners Temple in San Diego, California. The inscription reads: "JIMMY DURANTE THE WORLD'S MOST FAMOUS COMEDIAN. A loving cup to you Jimmy, it's larger than your nose, but smaller than your heart. Happiness always, Al Bahr Temple, August 15, 1958." Jimmy Durante started out his career with Clayton and Jackson, and when he became a big star and they were left behind, he kept them on his payroll for the rest of their lives.

Durante's love for children continued through the Fraternal Order of Eagles, who, among many causes, raise money for disabled and abused children. At Durante's first appearance at the Eagles International Convention in 1961, Judge Bob Hansen inquired about his fee for performing. Durante replied, "Do not even mention money, judge, or I'll have to mention a figure that'll make ya sorry ya brought it up." "What can we do then?" asked Hansen. "Help da kids," was Durante's reply. Durante performed for many years at Eagles conventions free of charge, even refusing travel money. The Fraternal Order of Eagles changed the name of their children's fund to the Jimmy Durante Children's Fund in his honor, and in his memory have raised over $23 million to help children. A reporter once remarked of Durante after an interview: "You could warm your hands on this one." One of the projects built using money from the Durante Fund was a heated therapy swimming pool at the Hughen School in Port Arthur, Texas. Completed in 1968, Durante named the pool the "Inka Dinka Doo Pool".

== Religion ==
Durante was deeply religious and a staunch Roman Catholic. In Las Vegas, he was seen regularly after Sunday Mass outside of the Guardian Angel Cathedral, standing next to the priest and greeting parishioners as they left the church. In 1968, he recorded 10 spiritual and inspirational songs for the album Songs for Sunday; it was expanded to 20 selections for a CD release under the same title in 1996.

== Politics ==
Durante was an active member of the Democratic Party. In 1933 he appeared in the short film Give a Man a Job shown in theaters supporting US President Franklin D. Roosevelt's New Deal programs. He performed at the inaugural gala for US President John F. Kennedy in 1961. In 1962, he performed at the Madison Square Garden rally for the Democratic Party that featured actress Marilyn Monroe singing "Happy Birthday" to the president.

== Later years and death ==
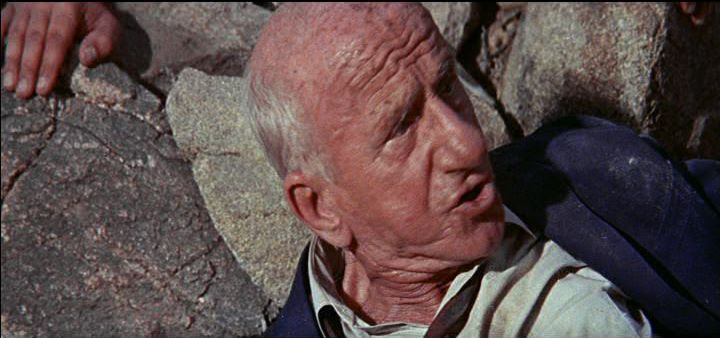
Durante in It's a Mad, Mad, Mad, Mad World

Durante continued his film appearances through the popular 1963 It's a Mad, Mad, Mad, Mad World and a number of television appearances through the early 1970s. He narrated the Rankin-Bass animated Christmas special Frosty the Snowman (1969). The television work also included a series of commercial spots for Kellogg's Corn Flakes cereals in the mid-1960s, which introduced Durante to millions of children. One of his last appearances was in a television commercial for the 1973 Volkswagen Beetle, where he proclaimed that the new, roomier Beetle had "plenty of breathin' room... for de old schnozzola!"

In 1963, Durante recorded the album of pop standards, September Song. The album became a best-seller and provided Durante's reintroduction to yet another generation, almost three decades later. Jimmy Durante's Way of Life album featured his interpretation of the song As Time Goes By, which accompanied the opening credits of the romantic comedy hit Sleepless in Seattle, while his version of "Make Someone Happy" was in the film's closing credits. Both are included on the film's best-selling soundtrack. Durante also recorded a cover of the well-known song I'll Be Seeing You, which became a trademark song on his 1960s TV show and was featured in the 2004 film The Notebook. The album also included Blue Bird of Happiness for which Durante provided his own modified lyrics and changed the spelling of the first word in the song's title from 'Bluebird' to 'Blue Bird'.

Durante wrote a foreword for a humor book compiled by Dick Hyman, titled Cockeyed Americana. In the first paragraph of the "Foreword!", as Durante called it, he describes meeting Hyman and discussing the book and the contribution that Hyman wanted Durante to make to it. Durante wrote, "Before I can say gaziggadeegasackeegazobbath, we're at his luxurious office." After reading the material Hyman had compiled for the book, Durante commented on it: "COLOSSAL, GIGANTIC, MAGNANIMOUS, and last but not first, AURORA BOREALIS. [Capitalization Durante's] Four little words that make a sentence—and a sentence that will eventually get me six months."

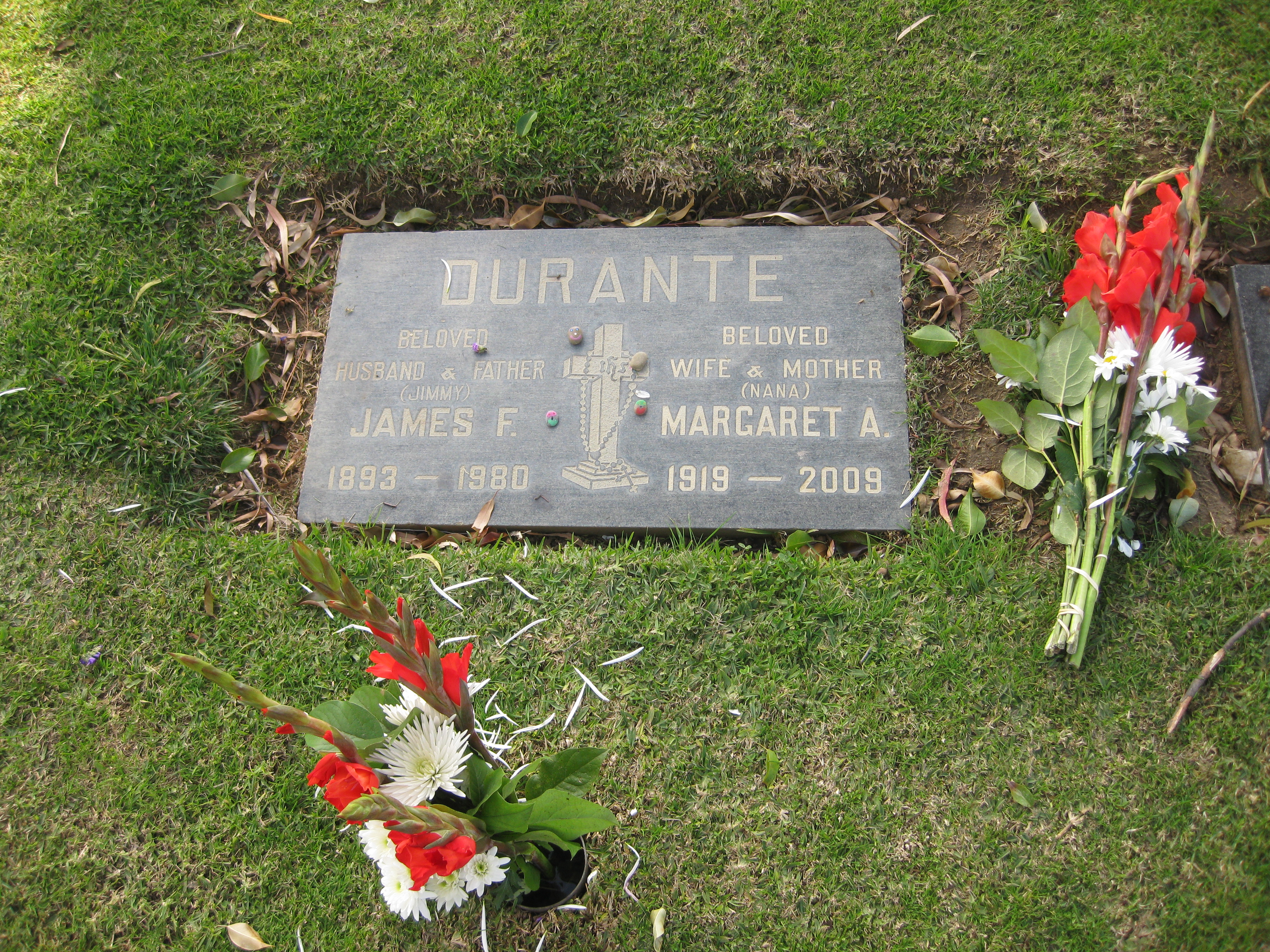
Jimmy and Margaret Durante's grave at Holy Cross Cemetery, Culver City, California

Durante retired from performing in 1972, following a stroke that left him a wheelchair user. He made a public appearance in 1974 when MGM held a reunion of its former stars, in connection with its new That's Entertainment! film.

Durante died of pneumonia in Santa Monica, California, on January 29, 1980, aged 86. He received Catholic funeral rites four days later, with fellow entertainers Desi Arnaz, Ernest Borgnine, Marty Allen, and Jack Carter in attendance, and was interred at Holy Cross Cemetery in Culver City, California.

== Legacy ==
Since Durante's death, his songs have featured in several films. Dan Aykroyd and Kim Basinger performed impressions of Durante from The Man Who Came to Dinner, singing "Did You Ever Have the Feeling" in 1988's My Stepmother Is an Alien. His performance of "Young at Heart" was featured in City Slickers (1991), and his versions of "As Time Goes By" and "Make Someone Happy" played over the opening and closing credits of Sleepless in Seattle (1993). Michael J. Fox performed an impression of Durante singing "Inka Dinka Doo" in 1994's Greedy. His rendition of "Smile" was in the film Joker (2019) and its trailer. His rendition of "The Glory of Love" was also used in the end credits of the horror film Orphan (2009), and in its prequel, Orphan: First Kill (2022), with a rendition of it sung by Isabelle Fuhrman. His song "The Day I Read a Book" is regularly played on NPR's Weekend Edition before author interviews and reviews. His work is also featured in sketches by British comedians Morecambe and Wise. His rendition of "I'll Be Seeing You" was used in the 2024 film Deadpool & Wolverine as the titular duo go through a sling ring made by the film's main antagonist, Cassandra Nova.

== Filmography ==
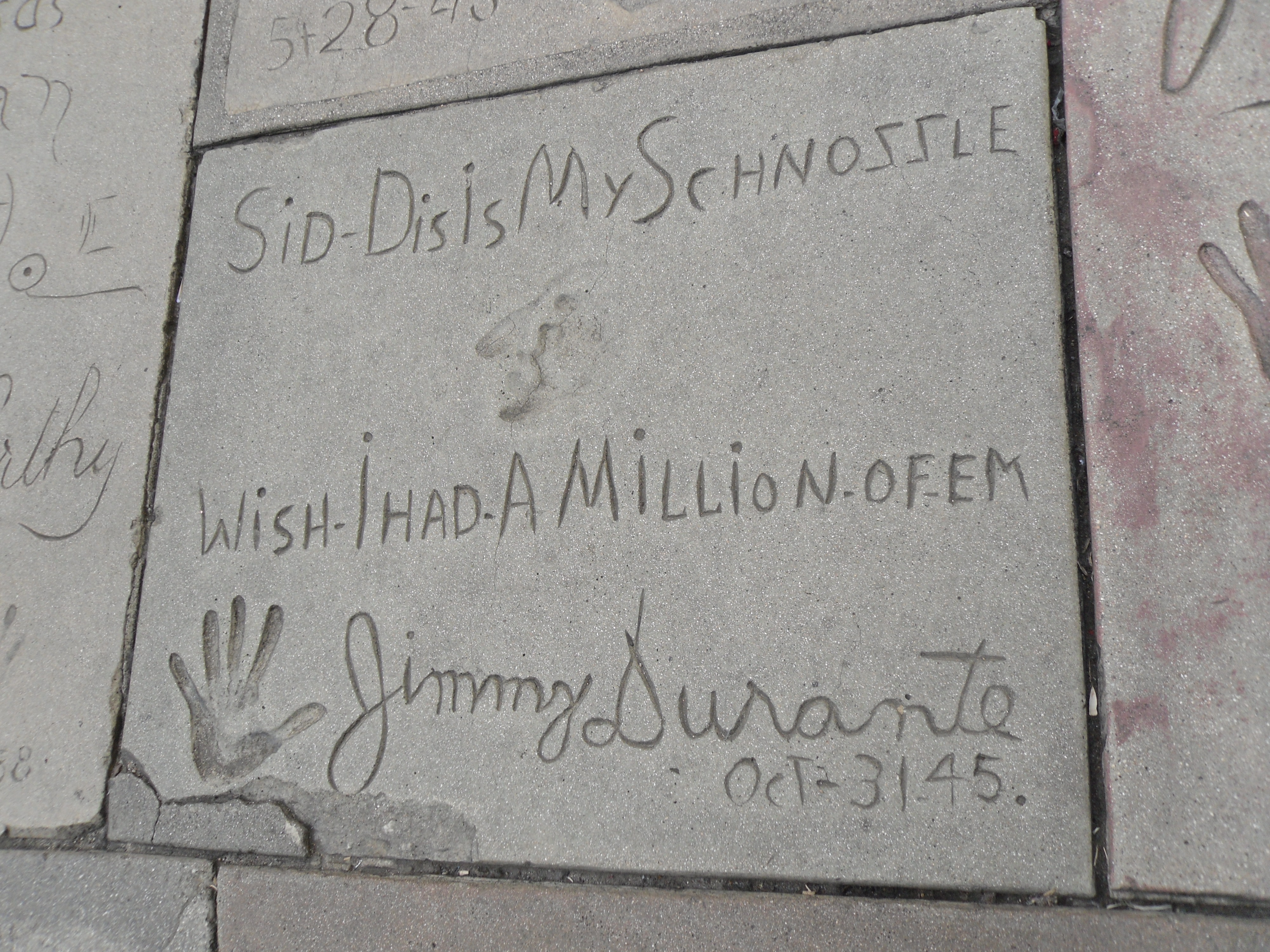
Jimmy Durante's noseprint, handprint, and signature in front of the Grauman's Chinese Theatre

- Roadhouse Nights (1930) as Daffy
- New Adventures of Get Rich Quick Wallingford (1931) as Schnozzle
- The Christmas Party (1931, Short) as Santa Claus (uncredited)
- The Cuban Love Song (1931) as O.O. Jones
- Jackie Cooper's Birthday Party (1931, Short)
- Hollywood on Parade: Down Memory Lane (1932, Short)
- Hollywood on Parade (1932, Short)
- The Passionate Plumber (1932) as Julius J. McCracken
- The Wet Parade (1932) as Abe Shilling
- Speak Easily (1932) as James
- Blondie of the Follies (1932) as Jimmy
- The Phantom President (1932) as Curly Cooney
- Le plombier amoureux (1932) as Tony
- Give a Man a Job (1933, Short)
- What! No Beer? (1933) as Jimmy Potts
- Hollywood on Parade No. 9 (1933, Short)
- Hell Below (1933) as Ptomaine, Ship's Cook
- Broadway to Hollywood (1933) as Himself, Hollywood Character
- Meet the Baron (1933) as Joe McGoo – the Favorite 'Schnozzle' of the Screen
- Palooka (1934) as Knobby Walsh
- George White's Scandals (1934) as Happy McGillicuddy
- Strictly Dynamite (1934) as Moxie
- Hollywood Party (1934) as Durante/Schnarzan
- Student Tour (1934) as Hank Merman, Trainer of the Crew
- Carnival (1935) as Fingers
- Land Without Music (1936) as Jonah J. Whistler
- Start Cheering (1938) as Willie Gumbatz
- Sally, Irene and Mary (1938) as Jefferson Twitchel
- Little Miss Broadway (1938) as Jimmy Clayton
- Melody Ranch (1940) as Cornelius J. Courtney
- You're in the Army Now (1941) as Jeeper Smith
- The Man Who Came to Dinner (1942) as Banjo
- Two Girls and a Sailor (1944) as Billy Kipp
- Music for Millions (1944) as Andrews
- Ziegfeld Follies (1945) (scenes deleted)
- Two Sisters from Boston (1946) as Spike
- It Happened in Brooklyn (1947) as Nick Lombardi
- This Time for Keeps (1947) as Ferdi Farro
- On an Island with You (1948) as Buckley
- The Great Rupert (1950) as Mr. Louie Amendola
- The Milkman (1950) as Breezy Albright
- Screen Snapshots: Hollywood Premiere (1955, Short) as Himself
- The Heart of Show Business (1957, Short) as Himself
- Beau James (1957) as Himself (cameo, uncredited)
- Pepe (1960) as Himself (cameo)
- The Last Judgment (1961) as The man with the large nose
- Billy Rose's Jumbo (1962) as Anthony 'Pop' Wonder
- It's a Mad, Mad, Mad, Mad World (1963) as "Smiler" Grogan
- Frosty the Snowman (1969) as Himself, Narrator (voice)

== Discography ==
- 1959: At the Piano – In Person
- 1961: Jimmy Durante at the Copacabana
- 1963: September Song
- 1964: Hello Young Lovers
- 1964: Jimmy Durante's Way of Life...
- 1966: One of Those Songs
- 1967: Songs for Sunday
