= Dear World =

1969 Broadway musical

- Music: Jerry Herman
- Lyrics: Jerry Herman
- Book: Jerome Lawrence and Robert E. Lee
- Basis: Jean Giraudoux's play The Madwoman of Chaillot
- Productions: 1969 Broadway; 2013 London; 2023 Encores!

Dear World is a musical with music and lyrics by Jerry Herman and book by Jerome Lawrence and Robert E. Lee. With its opening, Herman became the first composer-lyricist in history to have three productions running simultaneously on Broadway. It starred Angela Lansbury, who won the Tony Award for Leading Actress in a Musical in 1969 for her performance as the Countess Aurelia.

Based on The Madwoman of Chaillot by French dramatist Jean Giraudoux, as adapted by Maurice Valency, the plot follows the eccentric Countess Aurelia and her struggles against the straitlaced authority figures in her life. She and her Chaillot cohort defend their Parisian neighborhood against scheming and corrupt developers. The forces of idealism, love, and poetry win over those of greed, materialism, and science.

== Productions and background ==
Photo of actress Angela Lansbury in 1969 as Countess Aurelia for the musical.

The musical had a notably troubled preview period that included multiple changes to the script and score. Lucia Victor, Gower Champion's assistant and a director of several revivals, including Hello, Dolly!, was hired as director, but resigned shortly thereafter, due to "artistic differences" with the musical's star, Angela Lansbury, and the authors, according to The New York Times. Peter Glenville was then hired, but resigned following negative reviews during tryouts in Boston, Massachusetts. Producer Alexander H. Cohen stated (in an article in The New York Times of November 19, 1968) that "there was no friction between Mr. Glenville and Miss Lansbury, the composer, the authors or the producer... an advance arrangement had been made with Mr. Glenville to direct the show through last week only." The show's final director, Joe Layton, was then hired, also replacing the choreographer Donald Saddler.

The musical opened on Broadway at the Mark Hellinger Theatre on February 6, 1969 and closed on May 31, 1969 after 132 performances and 45 previews. In addition to direction and choreography by Joe Layton, scenic design was by Oliver Smith, costume design was by Freddy Wittop and lighting design was by Jean Rosenthal.

=== Subsequent productions ===
Originally conceived as a chamber musical, Dear World fell victim to a massive production that effectively overwhelmed the simplicity of the original tale. After the Broadway closing, Herman, Lawrence, and Lee rewrote the show, "putting back the intimacy that had been undermined on Broadway."

A revised version was produced at Goodspeed Musicals (Connecticut) in November–December 2000, with Sally Ann Howes as Aurelia. This version had a revised book by David Thompson plus three songs written after the musical closed. A concert version was staged by 42nd Street Moon in San Francisco, September 6–24, 2000. This production used the revision by Herman, Lawrence and Lee.

A further revised version was produced at the Sundance Theatre (Utah) from June to August 2002 with Maureen McGovern playing Aurelia. This is the version currently available for licensing. Thompson revised his previous revision of the book and the score was reshuffled with some new or previously cut songs included. A Sensible Woman, about how the "madwoman" feels one's life should be led, opens the show (as it did at the Goodspeed). One Person, cut at Goodspeed, is back in, ending Act One. The title song is sung by the three madwomen, as a kind of lullaby that leads into One Person. The song called Through the Bottom of the Glass that opened the original production does not appear in the revised show, and the song Have a Little Pity on the Rich, sung by the Sewerman during Broadway previews but cut before opening night, has been restored. The original 26-person Philip J. Lang orchestrations (26 was the minimum for the Mark Hellinger Theatre in 1969) have been distilled for a chamber ensemble with 8 players.

The Canadian premiere of this revised version was presented by the Toronto Civic Light Opera Company in May 2012. Directed by Joe Cascone, the production starred Barbara Boddy as Aurelia, David Haines as the Sewerman and featured Elizabeth Rose Morriss and Daniel Cornthwaite as the young lovers.

The musical had its UK premiere at London's Charing Cross Theatre from February 4 through March 16, 2013. The production was directed and choreographed by Gillian Lynne and starred Betty Buckley as Aurelia, Paul Nicholas as Sewerman and Stuart Matthew Price as Julian. Set design was by Matt Kinley, costumes by Ann Hould-Ward, lighting by Mike Robertson, musical direction by Ian Townsend, sound by Mike Walker, and orchestrations were by Sarah Travis.

The York Theatre Company (New York City) presented the musical from February 25 to March 5, 2017, starring Tyne Daly as Countess Aurelia. Daly had previously starred in a concert version of Dear World at the Valley Performing Arts Center in Los Angeles on September 30, 2016. The concert featured Steven Weber as the Sewerman and Vicki Lewis and Bets Malone as Aurelia's friends.

New York City Center Encores! presented a staged concert from March 15 to March 19, 2023 directed by Josh Rhodes using the original full orchestrations. The production starred Donna Murphy as Countess Aurelia.

== Plot ==
A corporation has discovered oil under the streets of Paris, directly under a bistro. The Countess Aurelia (known as The Madwoman of Chaillot) lives in the bistro's basement, driven mad because of a lost lover and reminiscing about her past. When the corporation decides to blow up the bistro to get the oil, a young executive, Julian, helps to foil the plan because he has fallen in love with Nina, the bistro's waitress. Aurelia lures the corporation executives to the underground in the sewer system.

== Songs (Original Score Order) ==
Act I

- 1. Overture - Orchestra
- 2. Opening Scene - Orchestra
- 3. "Through the Bottom of the Glass" - Countess Aurelia
- 4. "Rain Reprise: Bottom of the Glass" - Countess
- 5. Riverbank - Orchestra
- 6. "Just a Little Bit More" - President, Prospector, Lawyer
- 7. "Reprise: Just a Little Bit More" - President, Prospector, Lawyer
- 8. "More" Playoff/Scene Change - Orchestra
- 9. Chimes•Concertina Underscore #1 - Orchestra
- 10. Drowned Man - Orchestra
- 11. Chimes•Concertina Underscore #2 - Orchestra
- 12. "Each Tomorrow Morning" - Countess
- 13. "First Reprise: Each Tomorrow Morning" - Countess & Chorus
- 14. Chimes•Concertina Underscore #3 - Orchestra
- 15. "I Don't Want to Know" - Countess
- 16. "Second Reprise: Each Tomorrow Morning" - Countess, Julian
- 17. "I've Never Said I Love You" - Nina
- 18. Flea Market - Orchestra
- 19. Sewerman Scherzo - Orchestra
- 20. "Pretty Garbage" - Sewerman, Countess, Gabrielle, Constance
- 21. "Ugly Garbage" - Sewerman, Constance, Gabrielle
- 22. "Ugly Garbage Dance" - Sewerman & Company
- 23. "One Person" - Countess & Chorus

Entr'Acte

- 24. Entr'Acte - Orchestra

Act II

- 25. "The Spring of Next Year" - President, Prospector, Lawyer
- 26. Stoned Music - Orchestra
- 27. "Memory" - Constance
- 28. "Pearls" - Countess and Gabrielle
- 29. "Dickie" - Gabrielle & Countess
- 30. "Voices" - Constance
- 31. "Thoughts" - Countess
- 32. "Tea Party Trio" - Countess, Constance, Gabrielle
- 33. Ber-Ber Underscoring - Orchestra
- 34. "And I Was Beautiful" - Countess
- 35. "Beautiful" Playoff/Scene Change - Orchestra
- 36. "Dear World" - Julian & Company
- 37. Descent - "Reprise: The Spring of Next Year" - President, Prospector, Lawyer & Pimps
- 38. "Kiss Her Now" - Countess
- 39. Finale Ultimo - Countess & Company
- 40. Bows - Countess & Full Company
- 41. Exit Music - Orchestra

== Songs (Earlier Revision) ==
Act I

- "A Sensible Woman" – Aurelia †
- "The Spring of Next Year"—The Chairman of The Board, The Prospector and The Corporation
- "Each Tomorrow Morning"—Countess Aurelia and All
- "I Don't Want to Know"—Countess Aurelia
- "Just A Little Bit More"—The Chairman and the Corporation
- "I've Never Said I Love You"—Nina
- "Just a Little Bit More" (reprise) – The Chairman of the Board and the Corporation †
- "Garbage"—The Sewer Man, Countess Aurelia, Gabrielle, Constance and All
- "Dear World"—Countess Aurelia, Julian and All

Act II

- "Kiss Her Now"—Countess Aurelia
- "Memories"—Constance
- "Pearls"—Countess Aurelia and Gabrielle
- "Dickie"—Gabrielle
- "Voices"—Constance
- "Thoughts"—Countess Aurelia
- "And I Was Beautiful"—Countess Aurelia
- "Have a Little Pity on the Rich"—The Sewerman †
- "Each Tomorrow Morning" (Reprise) Julian
- "One Person"—Countess Aurelia and All
- "Finale"—Company

† Added in the Goodspeed (2000) and Sundance (2002) versions

== 2006 Musical Numbers (Version Available for Licensing) ==
Act I

- 1. Overture: [Dear World, Each Tomorrow Morning, I Don’t Want to Know, Kiss Her Now] - Orchestra
- 1a. Countess’ Entrance - Orchestra
- 2. A Sensible Woman - Countess Aurelia
- 2a. Reprise: A Sensible Woman - Countess Aurelia
- 2b. Scene Change: [A Sensible Woman] - Orchestra
- 3. Just a Little Bit More (Part One) - The Three Presidents and the Prospector
- 3a. Just a Little Bit More (Part Two) - The Three Presidents and the Prospector
- 3b Scene Change: [Just a Little Bit More] - Orchestra
- 3c. Twelve O’Clock [And I Was Beautiful] - Church Bell (Waiter ad lib.)
- 3d. Underscore: Adolphe Bertaut [And I Was Beautiful] - Orchestra
- 4. Each Tomorrow Morning - Countess, Nina, Julian, Waiter & Sergeant
- 4a. Tag: Just a Little Bit More - The Three Presidents and the Prospector
- 5. Sewerman Scherzo - Orchestra
- 6. Pretty Garbage - Sewerman, Julian, Nina & Countess
- 7. I Don’t Want to Know - Countess Aurelia
- 7a. One O’Clock - Church Bell
- 7b. Underscore: Now Go [Each Tomorrow Morning] - Orchestra
- 8. I’ve Never Said I Love You - Nina
- 8a. Scene Change: You Hoo, Aurelia [Each Tomorrow Morning] - Orchestra
- 9. Dear World - Countess, Constance & Gabrielle
- 10. One Person - Countess, Gabrielle, Constance, Nina, Julian, Sergeant & Waiter

Act Two

- 11. Entr’acte: [Each Tomorrow Morning, I Don’t Want to Know] - Orchestra
- 12. The Spring of Next Year - The Three Presidents and the Prospector
- 12a. Scene Change: [One Person] - Orchestra
- 12b. Underscore: Stone Music [The Spring of Next Year] - Orchestra
- 12c. Two O’Clock - Church Bell
- 13. Memory - Constance
- 14. Pearls - Countess Aurelia & Gabrielle
- 15. Dickie - Gabrielle
- 16. Voices - Constance
- 17. Thoughts - Countess Aurelia
- 18. Tea Party Trio - Countess Aurelia, Constance & Gabrielle
- 18a. Underscore: Music Box [And I Was Beautiful] - Orchestra
- 19. And I Was Beautiful - Countess Aurelia
- 20. Have a Little Pity on the Rich - Sewerman, Gabrielle & Constance
- 20a. Reprise: Dear World - Nina, Julian, Countess, Constance, Sewerman, Sergeant & Waiter
- 20b. Reprise: The Spring of Next Year - Three Presidents & Prospector
- 20c. Second Reprise: The Spring of Next Year - Three Presidents & Prospector
- 21. Kiss Her Now - Countess Aurelia
- 22. Finale: [And I Was Beautiful, Each Tomorrow Morning] - Countess, Nina, Julian, Sewerman, Mute, Waiter, Sergeant, Gabrielle & Constance
- 23. Bows: [Each Tomorrown Morning, Dear World] - Orchestra
- 24. Exit Music: [Each Tomorrow Morning, I Don’t Want to Know] - Orchestra

== Characters and original Broadway cast ==
- Countess Aurelia (The Madwoman of Chaillot) – Angela Lansbury
- Gabrielle (The Madwoman of Montmartre) – Jane Connell
- Constance (The Madwoman of the Flea Market) – Carmen Mathews
- The Sewerman – Milo O'Shea
- Julian – Kurt Peterson
- The Chairman – William Larsen
- Nina – Pamela Hall

== Awards and nominations ==
=== Original Broadway production ===
Year	Award Ceremony	Category	Nominee	Result
1969	Tony Award			
1969	Tony Award	Best Performance by a Leading Actress in a Musical	Angela Lansbury	Won
1969	Tony Award	Best Scenic Design	Oliver Smith	Nominated

== Critical response ==
"Except for the cast, I didn't want to face anybody. I Felt I had failed myself and let everybody down."

— Jerry Herman after Dear World's closing.

The show received mostly negative reviews. Time magazine called the songs "a total zero," while Martin Gottfried, noting that the plot line had been cut to ribbons, found "the story impossible to follow."

Walter Kerr wrote that the musical "is in the main quite charming...the actress [Lansbury]...is endearing throughout the evening and at her commanding best here." Her song "I Don't Want to Know" is "a song surprised by its own unexpected passion. The effect doesn't always work out for composer Jerry Herman...'Dear World' is attractive when it is staying close to its addled Good People...it is in trouble whenever it turns to the Bad People...Oliver Smith's settings are perfect." Clive Barnes in The New York Times gave Lansbury a positive review: "The minor miracle is Miss Lansbury...no connoisseur of musical comedy can afford to miss Miss Lansbury's performance. It is lovely."

According to Steven Citron, "[Sally Ann] Howes and the majority of critics now believe that with a rewritten libretto it could be turned into a successful musical."
