= Peggy Cass =

American actress, comedian (1924–1999)

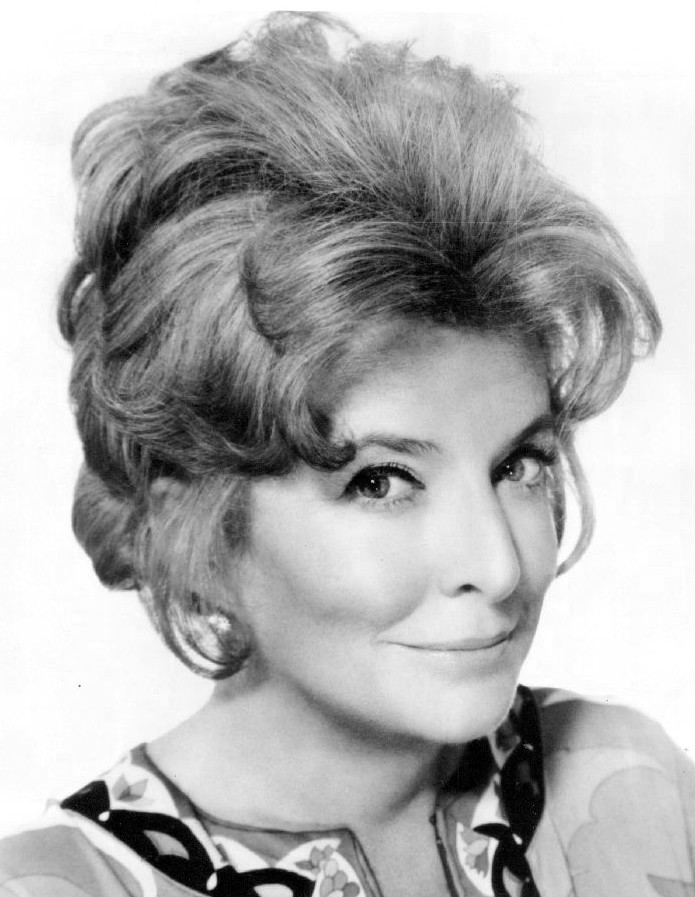
- Cass in 1973
- Born: Mary Margaret Cass; May 21, 1924
- Died: March 8, 1999 (aged 74); New York City, U.S.
- Occupations: Actress; comedian; game show panelist; announcer
- Years active: 1949–1997
- Spouses: Carl Fisher (m. 1948; div. 1965) Eugene Feeney (m. 1979)

Mary Margaret "Peggy" Cass (May 21, 1924 – March 8, 1999) was an American actress, comedian, game show panelist, and announcer.

As an actress, Cass is best known for originating the role of Agnes Gooch in the 1956 stage and 1958 film versions of Auntie Mame, for which she won a Tony Award and a Theatre World Award, and was nominated for the Academy Award for Best Supporting Actress, the Golden Globe Award for Best Supporting Actress, and two Laurel Awards. As a television personality, Cass is best known as one of the resident panelists on To Tell the Truth from 1962 to 1968 when hosted by Bud Collyer, 1969 to 1978 when hosted by Garry Moore and his successors Bill Cullen and Joe Garagiola, and 1990 when hosted by Gordon Elliott.

== Early life ==
Peggy Cass received acting training at HB Studio in New York City and eventually landed the lead role of Billie Dawn in a traveling production of Born Yesterday.

== Stage and film ==
Cass made her Broadway debut in 1949 with the play Touch and Go. She portrayed Agnes Gooch in Auntie Mame on Broadway and in the film version (1958), a role for which she won the Tony Award for Best Supporting Actress, and received an Oscar nomination for Best Supporting Actress.

She was cast as "First Woman" in the nine-member ensemble of the 1960 Broadway revue A Thurber Carnival, adapted by James Thurber from his own works. She played several characters throughout the performance, including: the mother in "The Wolf at the Door", the narrator of "The Little Girl and the Wolf", a nameless American tourist (who insisted Macbeth was a murder mystery), Miss Alma Winege in "File and Forget" (who wanted to ship to Mr. Thurber 36 copies of Grandma Was a Nudist, which he did not order), Mrs. Preble in "Mr. Preble Gets Rid of His Wife", Lou in "Take Her Up Tenderly" (who was helping to make old poetry more cheerful), and Walter Mitty's wife.

In 1961, she played Mitzi Stewart in the movie Gidget Goes Hawaiian. In 1964, she starred as First Lady Martha Dinwiddie Butterfield in the mock-biographical novel First Lady: My Thirty Days in the White House. The book, written by Auntie Mame author Patrick Dennis, included photographs by Cris Alexander of Cass, Dody Goodman, Kaye Ballard and others who portrayed the novel's characters.

In the late 1960s and early 1970s, Cass succeeded other actresses in Don't Drink the Water (as Marion Hollander) and in Neil Simon's Plaza Suite, and played Mollie Malloy in two revival runs of The Front Page. She also appeared in the 1969 film comedy If It's Tuesday, This Must Be Belgium. In the 1980s, she returned to the stage in 42nd Street and in the 1985 run of The Octette Bridge Club.

== Television and stage ==
One of Cass's earliest television roles was as Elinore Hathaway in The Hathaways, a 26-episode situation comedy that aired on ABC from October 6, 1961, to March 30, 1962. She starred with Jack Weston as suburban Los Angeles "parents" to a trio of performing chimpanzees. Weston portrayed Walter Hathaway, a real estate agent, and Cass was his zany wife, "mother" and booking agent for the Marquis Chimps, named Candy, Charlie and Enoch.

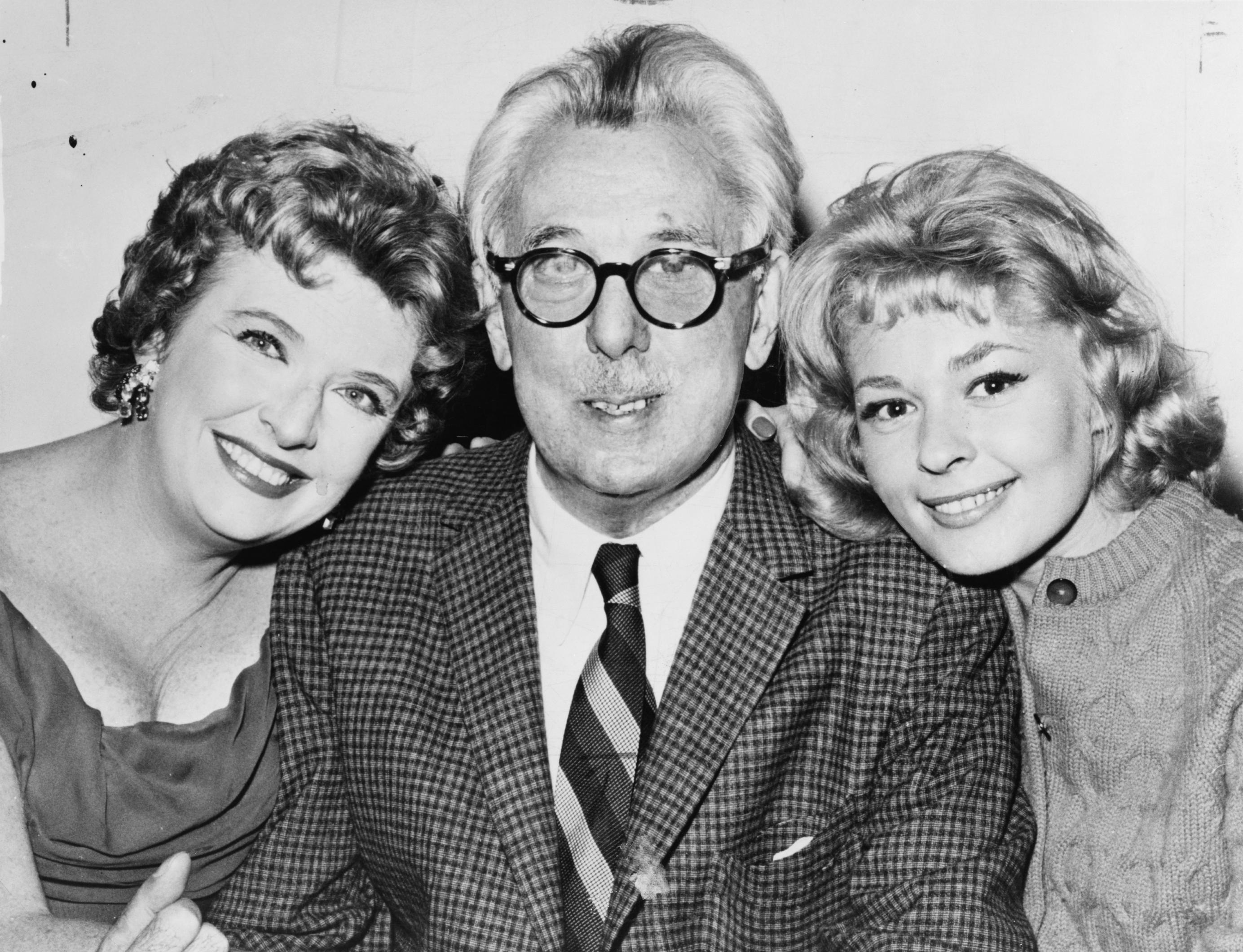
Peggy Cass (left) with James Thurber and Joan Anderson in A Thurber Carnival (1960)

Cass was the announcer on Jack Paar's late night talk show, Jack Paar Tonite that aired in 1973 on ABC. In addition to her work with Paar, Cass's notable television work includes appearances on many game shows, on shows based mainly in New York City. She was a regular panelist on To Tell the Truth from 1960 through its 1990 revival, appearing in most episodes in the 1960s and 1970s. She was also a panelist on the pilot of the 1960s version of Match Game.

On To Tell the Truth and other series, she often displayed near-encyclopedic knowledge of various topics and would occasionally question the logic of some of the "facts" presented on the program. Cass appeared on What's My Line? in 1963, and made several appearances on the $10,000 & $20,000 Pyramid hosted by Dick Clark from 1973 to 1980, as well as the nighttime version, which was titled The $25,000 Pyramid (1974–1979), hosted by her friend Bill Cullen. All three of these versions were taped in New York City. She also appeared in the late 1970s on Shoot for the Stars hosted by Geoff Edwards, which was another game show that partnered contestants with celebrities, also filmed in New York City.

In 1983, she appeared in the New Amsterdam Theatre Company's concert staging of Kurt Weill and Ogden Nash's One Touch of Venus as Mrs. Kramer, with Susan Lucci as her daughter, as well as Lee Roy Reams, Ron Raines, and Paige O'Hara as the titular Venus. In the spring of 1991, she participated in a concert staging of Cole Porter's Fifty Million Frenchmen at New York City's French Institute Alliance Française as Mrs. Gladys Carroll, singing Porter's "The Queen of Terre Haute".

In 1987, Cass was featured in the early Fox sitcom Women in Prison. Aside from sitcoms, she played the role of H. Sweeney on the NBC afternoon soap opera, The Doctors from 1978 to 1979.

Cass appeared on the pilot episode of Major Dad on September 17, 1989. She portrayed Esther Nettleton, a civilian secretary working on the Marine base for Maj. John "Mac" MacGillis.

== Personal life and death ==
On March 8, 1999, Cass died of heart failure in New York City at age 74 at the Memorial Sloan-Kettering Cancer Center.

== Filmography ==
Year	Title	Role	Notes
1952	The Marrying Kind	Emily Bundy	Uncredited
1958	Auntie Mame	Agnes Gooch	
1959	Alfred Hitchcock Presents	Rhoda Motherwell	Season 4 Episode 13: "Six People, No Music"
1961	Gidget Goes Hawaiian	Mitzi Stewart	
1969	If It's Tuesday, This Must Be Belgium	Edna Ferguson	
1969	Age of Consent	His Wife	
1970	Paddy	Irenee	

== Stage ==
Year	Title	Role(s)	Notes	Ref.
1945	The Doughgirls	performer		
1949	Touch and Go	Moonbeam / Olivia / Second Sister	Broadway debut	
1950	The Live Wire	Liz Fargo		
1952	Bernardine	Helen		
1956	Auntie Mame	Agnes Gooch		
1960	A Thurber Carnival	performer		
1963	Children From Their Games	Vera von Stobel		
1968	Don't Drink the Water	Marion Hollander		
1969	The Front Page	Mollie Malloy		
1970	Plaza Suite	Karen Nash / Muriel Tate / Norma Hubley		
1979	Once a Catholic	Mother Basil		
1981	42nd Street	Maggie Jones		
1983	Agnes of God	Mother Miriam Ruth		
1985	The Octette Bridge Club	Lil		

== Awards and nominations ==
Year	Award	Category	Nominated work	Results	Ref.
1958	Academy Awards	Best Supporting Actress	Auntie Mame	Nominated	
1958	Golden Globe Awards	Best Supporting Actress – Motion Picture	Auntie Mame	Nominated	
1958	Laurel Awards	Top Female Supporting Performance	Auntie Mame	Nominated	
1958	Laurel Awards	Top Female New Personality	—N/a	6th Place	
1973	Photoplay Awards	Variety Star	—N/a	Nominated	
1974	Photoplay Awards	Variety Star	—N/a	Nominated	
1975	Photoplay Awards	Variety Star	—N/a	Nominated	
1957	Theatre World Awards	—N/a	Auntie Mame	Won	
1957	Tony Awards	Best Supporting or Featured Actress in a Musical	Auntie Mame	Won	

Esther Nettleton
