= Little Me (novel) =

1961 novel by Patrick Dennis

First edition (publ. E. P. Dutton)

Little Me: The Intimate Memoirs of that Great Star of Stage, Screen and Television, or simply Little Me, was the parody "confessional" self-indulgent autobiography of "Belle Poitrine" (French for "Pretty Bosom"). It was written by Patrick Dennis, who had achieved a great success with Auntie Mame. A bestseller when introduced in book form, the work was also later staged on Broadway as a musical.

The heavily illustrated work featured numerous photographs by Cris Alexander, who combined retouched stock photographs with original photographs taken to create Belle Poitrine's life. Published in 1961, it was considered pretty risqué at the time. (Several of Alexander's photographs were rejected by censors.) The book also featured family and friends of Dennis and Alexander, including Dennis' wife, Louise, as "Pixie Portnoy", and ballet dancer Shaun O'Brien (Alexander's domestic partner) as Mr. Musgrove. Actress Dodie Goodman and comedian Alice Pearce were prominently featured. Actress Jeri Archer portrayed the often overexposed, self-centered and clueless Poitrine, and Kurt Bieber was her beefcake co-star and paramour, "Letch Feely". Little Me was reissued in 2002 with a new preface by Charles Busch and foreword by Alexander.

The plot of Little Me tells the rags-to-riches-to-rags-to-riches, etc. story of Maybelle Schlumpfert, an overdeveloped and self-deluded young girl who rises to become Belle Poitrine. (Note: An example of her delusions: Belle is born in 1900 and the book is structured a chapter per decade, but chapter six is titled "Frankly Forty".) Throughout the book, Poitrine's character trumpets her successes (which are few) while glossing over her failures (which are many). The book was a sharp parody of the cult of celebrity and self-importance that emerged from the numerous "personality overcoming obstacles" biographies of the late 1940s and early 1950s.

== Little Me, the musical ==
Little Me was made into a musical, with book by Neil Simon, music by Cy Coleman, and lyrics by Carolyn Leigh, which opened at the Lunt-Fontanne Theatre on November 17, 1962 and ran for 257 performances.
