= Little Me =

Little Me may refer to:

- Little Me (novel), autobiographical novel by Patrick Dennis
  - Little Me (musical), 1962 musical based on the novel
    - "Little Me", the musical's title song, later covered by Little Peggy March
- "Little Me" (song), 2013 song by Little Mix
- Little Me, infants' and toddlers' clothing brand by Mamiye Brothers
