= Kurt Bieber =

American actor

Kurt Bieber (January 5, 1929 – December 31, 2015) was an American actor and male model. He gained notoriety as the character Letch Feeley in photographs by Cris Alexander for the illustrated 1961 parody "confessional" novel Little Me, a bestseller by Patrick Dennis.

Born Kermit Henry Bieber in Allentown, Pennsylvania, he served in the military during the Korean war. Upon discharge he moved to New York City to study drama, dance and voice with the American Theatre Wing. He then appeared in summer stock companies of several plays and musicals including Wish You Were Here, Wonderful Town, Can-Can, and On The Town. He made his Broadway debut in 1958 as a sailor in the original cast of The World of Suzie Wong with William Shatner. He appeared a regional production of The Teahouse of the August Moon with Red Buttons in 1960.

Starting in the late 1960s, Bieber became a model for Colt Studio Group. In addition to several commercials, he appeared in the films Cruising as a club goer and in Midnight Cowboy as a Times Square street hustler. Kurt Bieber spoke about his movie experiences in the February 1980 issue of Mandate magazine in the exclusive feature "The Men of Cruising". Some of his Colt studio photos again appeared in the June 1980 Mandate article "Whatever Happened To Letch Feeley?"
