= Yuki Shimoda =

American actor (1921–1981)

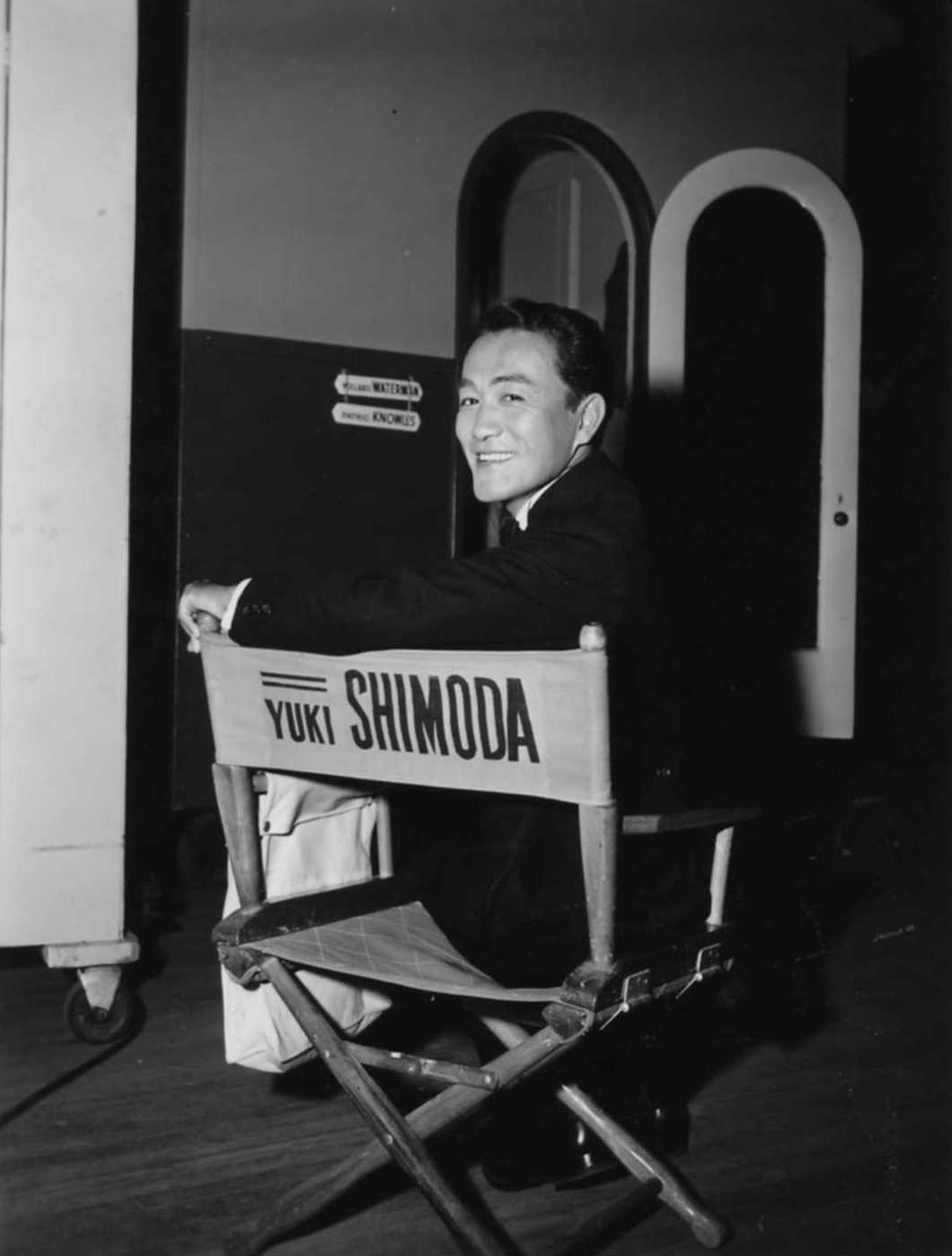
- Born: Yukio Shimoda; August 10, 1921; Sacramento, California, US
- Died: May 21, 1981 (aged 59); Los Angeles, California, US
- Occupations: Actor, dancer
- Years active: 1953–1981

Yuki Shimoda (Japanese: 下田 幸夫, August 10, 1921 – May 21, 1981) was an American actor best known for his starring role as Ko Wakatsuki in the NBC movie of the week Farewell to Manzanar in 1976.

== Career ==
He also co-starred in the 1960s television series Johnny Midnight (39 episodes), with Edmond O'Brien. He was a star of movies, early television, and the stage. His Broadway stage credits include Auntie Mame with Rosalind Russell (and its subsequent film adaptation), and Pacific Overtures, a musical written by Stephen Sondheim and directed by Harold Prince.

During World War II, following the signing of Executive Order 9066, Shimoda was incarcerated to the Tule Lake War Relocation Center. Following his release, he relocated to Chicago where he taught Japanese at the University of Chicago and received a degree in accounting from Northwestern University. He also worked as a dancer with the Chicago Opera Company.

Shimoda died of cancer May 21, 1981, at the UCLA Medical Center in Los Angeles.

== Broadway stage credits ==
- Teahouse of the August Moon, Martin Beck Theatre, (1953–1956), as Mr. Keora, choreographer
- Auntie Mame, Broadhurst Theatre, (1956–1958), as Ito
- Pacific Overtures, Winter Garden Theatre, (1975–1976), as Abe, First Councillor

== Filmography ==
=== Film ===
- Auntie Mame (1958) as Ito
- Don't Give Up the Ship (1959) as Japanese Colonel (uncredited)
- Career (1959) as Yosho
- All in a Night's Work (1961) as Kim (uncredited)
- The Pleasure of His Company (1961) as Gardner (uncredited)
- Man-Trap (1961) as Japanese Man (uncredited)
- Seven Women from Hell (1961) as Dr. Matsumo
- A Majority of One (1961) as Mr. Asano's Secretary
- The Horizontal Lieutenant (1962) as Kobayashi
- Once a Thief (1965) as John Ling, Chinese Funeral Director
- Girls Are for Loving (1973) as Ambassador Hahn
- Midway (1976) as Japanese Naval officer on Hiryu
- MacArthur (1976) as Prime Minister Shidahara
- Hito Hata: Raise the Banner (1980) as Takagi
- The Last Flight of Noah's Ark (1980) as Hiro
- The Octagon (1980) as Katsumo, Seikura's aide
- Yuki Shimoda: Asian American Actor (1985) as himself

=== TV movies and mini-series ===
- The Impatient Heart (TV movie) (1971)
- Farewell to Manzanar (TV movie) (1976) as Ko Wakatsuki
- And the Soul Shall Dance (TV movie) (1978) as Oka
- A Death in Canaan (TV movie) (1978) as Dr Samura
- The Immigrants (TV movie) (1978) as Feng Wo
- A Town Like Alice (TV mini-series) (1981) as Sgt Mifune (final film role)

=== TV series ===
- Hallmark Hall of Fame
- Hawaiian Eye (1959–1961) as Mitho Koyoto / Mitsuki
- Johnny Midnight in role of Japanese manservant Uki (1960) as Aki / Lawyer
- Peter Gunn (1960) as Yuki
- Mister Ed (1961) as Sam
- Adventures in Paradise (1961) as Kenko Yoshimura
- The Tab Hunter Show (1961) as Freddy
- The Case of the Dangerous Robin (1961)
- The Blue Angels (1961) as Japanese Officer
- Follow the Sun (1961) as Bartender
- Alcoa Premiere (1962) as Ti Rong
- Thriller (1962) as Koto
- McHale's Navy (1962) as Major Simuru
- The Andy Griffith Show (1964) as Mr. Izamoto
- Gomer Pyle, U.S.M.C. (1965) as Oriental Man
- The Big Valley (1965) as Po Hsien
- I Spy (1965–1967) as Mr. Shung / Ishikura / Koyo
- It Takes a Thief (1970) as Salesman
- Ironside (1971–1972) as Ship Captain / Major
- Love American Style (1973) as 2nd Japanese Man (segment "Love and the Impossible Gift")
- Here We Go Again (1973) as Sam
- The Magician (1973) as Father Fred
- Kung Fu (1973–1974) as Shun Low / Man / Bandit / Various Characters
- Police Woman (1974) as Businessman
- Sanford and Son (1974) as Mr. Funai
- Judge Dee and the Monastery Murders (1974) as Pure Faith
- Kojak (1976) as Assassin
- Baa Baa Black Sheep, episode: "Up for Grabs", (1976) as Colonel Samuchi
- Quincy, M.E. (1977) as Dr. Hiro
- The New Adventures of Wonder Woman (1977) as Takeo Ishida
- CHiPs (1977) as Mr. Wee
- Mrs. Colombo (1979) as Soong
- Salvage 1 (1979) as Dr. George Takata
- M*A*S*H (1979–1981) as Key Yong Lu / Chung Ho Kim / Cho Pak
