= 11th Tony Awards =

1957 US theatrical awards ceremony

- Date: April 21, 1957
- Location: Waldorf-Astoria; New York City, New York
- Hosted by: Bud Collyer
- Most wins: My Fair Lady (6)
- Most nominations: My Fair Lady (10)

Television/radio coverage
- Network: none

The 11th Annual Tony Awards took place at the Waldorf-Astoria Grand Ballroom on April 21, 1957. The Master of Ceremonies was Bud Collyer.

== Eligibility ==
Shows that opened on Broadway during the 1956 season before February 28, 1957 are eligible.

Original plays

- Affair of Honor
- Auntie Mame
- The Best House in Naples
- Child of Fortune
- A Clearing in the Woods
- Diary of a Scoundrel
- Double in Hearts
- Eugenia
- Girls of Summer
- The Good Woman of Setzuan
- The Happiest Millionaire
- Harbor Lights
- The Hidden River
- A Hole in the Head
- Holiday for Lovers
- Intermezzo
- Le Chien du Jardinier
- Les Adieux
- The Little Glass Clock
- Long Day's Journey into Night
- The Loud Red Patrick
- The Lovers
- Mister Johnson
- Night of the Auk
- Pictures in the Hallway
- The Potting Shed
- Protective Custody
- The Reluctant Debutante
- Separate Tables
- Sixth Finger in a Five Finger Glove
- The Sleeping Prince
- Small War on Murray Hill
- Speaking of Murder
- Table by the Window
- Table Number Seven
- Too Late the Phalarope
- The Tunnel of Love
- Uncle Willie
- A Very Special Baby
- Visit to a Small Planet
- Waiting for Godot
- Wake Up, Darling
- The Waltz of the Toreadors

Original musicals

- Bells Are Ringing
- Candide
- Cranks
- Happy Hunting
- Li'l Abner
- The Littlest Revue
- The Most Happy Fella
- Mr. Wonderful
- My Fair Lady
- New Faces of 1956
- Shangri-La
- That Girl at the Bijou

Play revivals

- The Apple Cart
- Christophe Colomb
- Feu la Mere de Madame
- Goodbye Again
- Les Nuits de la Colere
- Macbeth
- Major Barbara
- Measure for Measure
- The Misanthrope
- A Month in the Country
- Saint Joan
- Richard II
- Romeo and Juliet
- The Taming of the Shrew
- Troilus and Cressida
- Volpone

== Ceremony ==
The presenters were Faye Emerson, Tom Ewell, Lillian Gish, Helen Hayes, Nancy Kelly, Bert Lahr, Beatrice Lillie, Nancy Olson, Elaine Perry, Cliff Robertson, and Cornelia Otis Skinner.

Performers were George Gaines and Michael King. Music was by Meyer Davis and his Orchestra. Due to a union dispute, there was no television broadcast, which had been scheduled for WCBS-TV Channel 2.

== Winners and nominees ==
Winners are in bold

Best Play	Best Musical
**Long Day's Journey into Night – Eugene O'Neill**; The Potting Shed – Graham Greene; Separate Tables – Terence Rattigan; The Waltz of the Toreadors – Jean Anouilh with English version by Lucienne Hill	**My Fair Lady**; Bells Are Ringing; Candide; The Most Happy Fella
Best Performance by a Leading Actor in a Play	Best Performance by a Leading Actress in a Play
**Fredric March – Long Day's Journey into Night as James Tyrone**; Maurice Evans – The Apple Cart as King Magnus; Wilfrid Hyde-White – The Reluctant Debutante as Jimmy Broadbent; Eric Portman – Separate Tables as Mr. Malcolm / Major Pollock; Ralph Richardson – The Waltz of the Toreadors as General St. Pé; Cyril Ritchard – Visit to a Small Planet as Kreton	**Margaret Leighton – Separate Tables as Mrs. Shankland / Miss Railton-Bell**; Florence Eldridge – Long Day's Journey into Night as Mary Cavan Tyrone; Rosalind Russell – Auntie Mame as Auntie Mame; Sybil Thorndike – The Potting Shed as Mrs. Callifer
Best Performance by a Leading Actor in a Musical	Best Performance by a Leading Actress in a Musical
**Rex Harrison – My Fair Lady as Henry Higgins**; Fernando Lamas – Happy Hunting as Duke of Granada; Robert Weede – The Most Happy Fella as Tony	**Judy Holliday – Bells Are Ringing as Ella Peterson**; Julie Andrews – My Fair Lady as Eliza Doolittle; Ethel Merman – Happy Hunting as Liz Livingstone
Best Performance by a Supporting or Featured Actor in a Play	Best Performance by a Supporting or Featured Actress in a Play
**Frank Conroy – The Potting Shed as Father William Callifer**; Eddie Mayehoff – Visit to a Small Planet as General Tom Powers; William Podmore – Separate Tables as Mr. Fowler; Jason Robards – Long Day's Journey into Night as James Tyrone, Jr.	**Peggy Cass – Auntie Mame as Agnes Gooch**; Anna Massey – The Reluctant Debutante as Jane Broadbent; Beryl Measor – Separate Tables as Miss Cooper; Mildred Natwick – The Waltz of the Toreadors as Mme. St. Pé; Phyllis Neilson-Terry – Separate Tables as Mrs. Railton-Bell; Diana Van der Vlis – The Happiest Millionaire as Cordelia Biddle
Best Performance by a Supporting or Featured Actor in a Musical	Best Performance by a Supporting or Featured Actress in a Musical
**Sydney Chaplin – Bells Are Ringing as Jeff Moss**; Robert Coote – My Fair Lady as Colonel Pickering; Stanley Holloway – My Fair Lady as Alfred P. Doolittle	**Edie Adams – Li'l Abner as Daisy Mae**; Virginia Gibson – Happy Hunting as Beth Livingstone; Irra Petina – Candide as The Old Lady / Madame Sofronia; Jo Sullivan – The Most Happy Fella as Rosabella
Best Director	Best Choreography
**Moss Hart – My Fair Lady**; Joseph Anthony – A Clearing in the Woods / The Most Happy Fella; Harold Clurman – The Waltz of the Toreadors; Peter Glenville – Separate Tables; José Quintero – Long Day's Journey into Night	**Michael Kidd – Li'l Abner**; Hanya Holm – My Fair Lady; Dania Krupska – The Most Happy Fella; Bob Fosse & Jerome Robbins – Bells Are Ringing
Best Scenic Design	Best Costume Design
**Oliver Smith – My Fair Lady**; Boris Aronson – A Hole in the Head / Small War on Murray Hill; Ben Edwards – The Waltz of the Toreadors; George Jenkins - The Happiest Millionaire / Too Late the Phalarope; Donald Oenslager – Major Barbara; Oliver Smith – Auntie Mame / A Clearing in the Woods / Candide / Eugenia / My Fair Lady / Visit to a Small Planet	**Cecil Beaton – My Fair Lady**; Cecil Beaton – The Little Glass Clock / My Fair Lady; Alvin Colt – Li'l Abner / The Sleeping Prince; Dorothy Jeakins – Major Barbara / Too Late the Phalarope; Irene Sharaff – Candide / Happy Hunting / Shangri-La / Small War on Murray Hill
Best Conductor and Musical Director	Best Stage Technician
**Franz Allers – My Fair Lady**; Herbert Greene – The Most Happy Fella; Samuel Krachmalnick – Candide	**Howard McDonald (posthumous), carpenter – Major Barbara**; Thomas Fitzgerald, sound man – Long Day's Journey into Night; Joseph Harbuck, carpenter - Auntie Mame

=== Multiple nominations and awards ===
These productions had multiple nominations:

- 10 nominations: My Fair Lady
- 6 nominations: Long Day's Journey into Night, The Most Happy Fella and Separate Tables
- 5 nominations: Candide and The Waltz of the Toreadors
- 4 nominations: Auntie Mame, Bells Are Ringing and Happy Hunting
- 3 nominations: Li'l Abner, Major Barbara, The Potting Shed and A Visit to a Small Planet
- 2 nominations: A Clearing in the Woods, The Happiest Millionaire, The Reluctant Debutante, Small War on Murray Hill and Too Late the Phalarope

The following productions received multiple awards.

- 6 wins: My Fair Lady
- 2 wins: Bells Are Ringing, Li'l Abner and Long Day's Journey into Night

== See also ==
- 29th Academy Awards
