= Philip Barry (disambiguation) =

Philip Barry (1896–1949) was an American playwright.

Philip Barry may also refer to:

- Philip de Barry (fl. 1183) of the De Barry family
- P. J. (Philip James) Barry, American playwright and author of The Octette Bridge Club
