= Dody Goodman =

American actress (1914–2008)

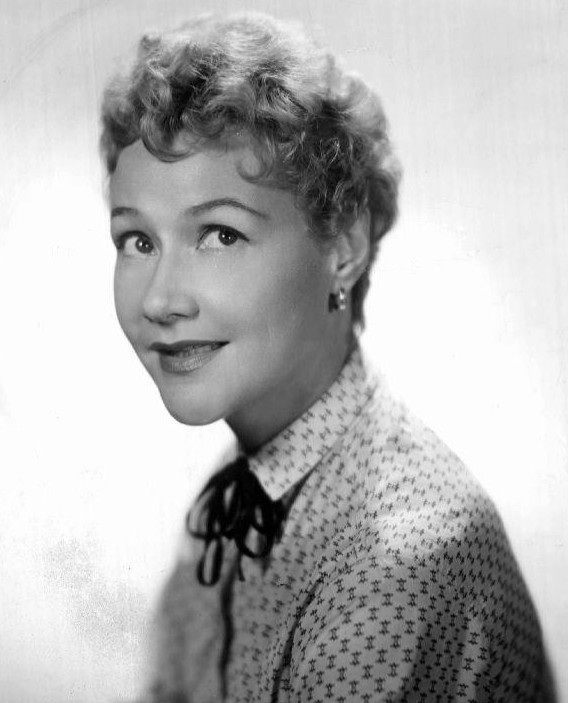
- Goodman in 1958
- Born: Dolores Goodman; October 28, 1914; Columbus, Ohio, U.S.
- Died: June 22, 2008 (aged 93); Englewood, New Jersey, U.S.
- Occupation: Actress
- Years active: 1947–2007

Dody Goodman (October 28, 1914 – June 22, 2008) was an American character actress. She played the mother of the title character in the television series Mary Hartman, Mary Hartman, her distinctive high-pitched voice announcing the show's title at the beginning of each episode. She was a frequent guest on The Tonight Show in the 1950s.

In the 1978 summer blockbuster film Grease, she played Blanche Hodel, the zany secretary in the principal's office. She reprised this role again in 1982 for Grease 2. In 1979 she appeared in The Mary Tyler Moore Hour, and in 1981-82 had the recurring role of Aunt Sophia in Diff'rent Strokes. Aside from film and television appearances, she also voiced Miss Miller in the television series Alvin and the Chipmunks and the film spin-off The Chipmunk Adventure. She also played on Punky Brewster as Punky's teacher, Mrs. Morton.

== Early life ==
Born Dolores Goodman in Columbus, Ohio, she was the daughter of Leona and Dexter Goodman. She had a sister, Rose, and a brother, Dexter Jr. She attended North High School in Columbus, Ohio (now Dominion Middle School) and is a member of the Hall of Fame at North High School. Goodman attended Northwestern University, where she studied dramatics, and two ballet schools—the School of American Ballet and the Metropolitan Opera Ballet School.

== Stage ==
Goodman's Broadway debut came in 1941. She gained a measure of newspaper column space for her dancing solos in such Broadway musicals as High Button Shoes (1947), and Wonderful Town (1953). In 1955, she stopped the show in Off Broadway's Shoestring Revue with the novelty song "Someone's Been Sending Me Flowers".

She also headlined Off-Broadway in the Jerry Herman musical revue Parade in 1960 with Charles Nelson Reilly. She played the role of Princess Winifred the Woebegone in the 1961 revival of Once Upon a Mattress, and Dora in the 1962 revival of Fiorello! She returned to Broadway in 1974 to appear in Lorelei with Carol Channing.

Goodman was described as "the darling of dinner theaters, regional theaters, summer stock, you name it." In 1976, she toured in a revival of George Washington Slept Here.

== Television ==
Adopting the guise of a fey airhead, Goodman was good for a few off-the-wall quotes whenever she submitted to an interview. She came to the attention of nighttime talkshow host Jack Paar who, after becoming enchanted with her ditzy persona and seemingly spontaneous malaprops, invited her to become a semi-regular on The Tonight Show.

As Goodman's fame grew, she became difficult to handle on the show, and Paar was not happy with her upstaging habits. She would 'top' his jokes. Commenting on another guest one evening, Paar quipped "Give them enough rope," "And they'll skip," ad-libbed Goodman, brightly. Dropped summarily by Paar in 1958, Goodman spent the next decade appearing on other talk programs, game shows and summer stock as a "professional celebrity".

Following Mary Hartman, Goodman was a regular cast member on The Mary Tyler Moore Hour on CBS in 1979. Her career gained momentum with regular appearances on TV's Diff'rent Strokes, Search for Tomorrow, Punky Brewster, and as aunt Mavis in 1982 on Texas, movie roles in Grease, Grease 2 and Splash, and cartoon voiceover work as Miss Miller, The Chipettes' guardian, on Alvin and the Chipmunks and its movie The Chipmunk Adventure.

Her distinctive voice was once described as sounding like "a tweetie pie cartoon bird strangling on peanut butter".

== Modeling ==
Goodman posed for photographs by Cris Alexander in the Patrick Dennis mock-biography First Lady, as Martha Dinwiddie's sister Clytie, who in the story married a European Count Przyzplätcki (pron. "splatsky") and perished on the RMS Titanic. She also helped produce another book with Alexander's photography entitled Women, Women, Women!

== Recognition ==
In 1958, Goodman was nominated for an Emmy Award for Best Continuing Performance (Female) in a Series by a Comedienne, Singer, Hostess, Dancer, M.C., Announcer, Narrator, Panelist, or any Person who Essentially Plays Herself.

Her work in a revival of Ah, Wilderness! in 1984 earned her a nomination for the Drama Desk Award for Outstanding Featured Actress in a Play.

== Death ==
Goodman died of natural causes on June 22, 2008, at Englewood Hospital and Medical Center in Englewood, New Jersey, aged 93, having lived at the Lillian Booth Actors Home since October 2007.

Goodman, who never married nor had children, was survived by seven nieces and nephews, 11 great nieces and nephews and 15 great-great nieces and nephews.

== Filmography ==
Year	Title	Role	Notes
1964	Bedtime Story	Fanny Eubank	
1976	Silent Movie	Tourist Woman #1	Uncredited role
1978	Grease	Blanche Hodel	
1982	Grease 2	Blanche Hodel	
1983	Max Dugan Returns	Mrs. Litke	
1984	Splash	Mrs. Stimler	
1985	Private Resort	Mrs. Rawlings	
1987	The Chipmunk Adventure	Miss. Beatrice Miller (voice)	
1988	Splash, Too	Mrs. Stimler	TV movie
1991	Samantha	Mrs. Higgins	
1991	Cool as Ice	Mae	
1992	Frozen Assets	Mrs. Patterson	
1995	Cops n Roberts		
2007	Black Ribbon	Aunt Gayle	(scenes deleted), (final film role)
