= Rosalind Russell =

American actress, model, comedian, screenwriter and singer (1907–1976)

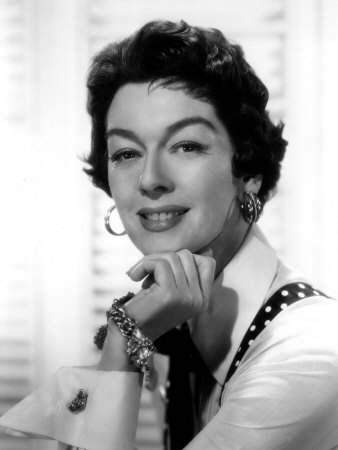
- Russell in 1955
- Born: Catherine Rosalind Russell; June 4, 1907; Waterbury, Connecticut, U.S.
- Died: November 28, 1976 (aged 69); Beverly Hills, California, U.S.
- Resting place: Holy Cross Cemetery
- Other name: C.A. McKnight
- Education: Rosemont College; Marymount College; American Academy of Dramatic Arts
- Occupations: Actress; model; comedian; screenwriter; singer
- Years active: 1929–1972
- Known for: Auntie Mame; His Girl Friday; Sister Kenny; Gypsy; The Women; A Majority of One
- Political party: Republican
- Spouse: Frederick Brisson (m. 1941)
- Children: 1
- Awards: Tony Award for Best Actress in a Musical; Hollywood Walk of Fame

Catherine Rosalind Russell (June 4, 1907 – November 28, 1976) was an American actress, model, comedian, screenwriter, and singer, known for her role as fast-talking newspaper reporter Hildy Johnson in the Howard Hawks screwball comedy His Girl Friday (1940), opposite Cary Grant, as well as for her role of catty Sylvia Fowler in George Cukor's The Women (1939), opposite Joan Crawford and Norma Shearer, and for her portrayals of Mame Dennis in the 1956 stage and 1958 film adaptations of Auntie Mame, and Rose in Gypsy (1962). A noted comedienne, she received various accolades, including five Golden Globe Awards and a Tony Award, in addition to nominations for four Academy Awards and a BAFTA Award. Russell has been honored with a Jean Hersholt Humanitarian Award in 1973 and Screen Actors Guild Life Achievement Award in 1975.

In addition to her comedic roles, Russell was known for playing dramatic characters, often wealthy, dignified, and stylish women. She was one of the few actresses of her time to portray women in professional roles such as judges, reporters, and psychiatrists. Russell's career spanned from the 1930s to the 1970s and she attributed this longevity to the fact that, although she had many glamorous roles, she never became a sex symbol.

== Early years ==
Catherine Rosalind Russell was one of seven children born in Waterbury, Connecticut, to James Edward, a lawyer, and Clara A. Russell (née McKnight), a teacher. The Russells were an Irish-American, Catholic family. She was named after a ship on which her parents had traveled. Russell attended Catholic schools, including the women-only Rosemont College in Rosemont, Pennsylvania, and Marymount College in Tarrytown, New York. She then attended the American Academy of Dramatic Arts in New York. Her parents thought Russell was studying to become a teacher and were unaware that she was planning to become an actress. Upon graduation from the performing arts school, Russell acted in summer stock and joined a repertory company in Boston.

== Career ==
=== Early career ===
Russell began her career as a fashion model and was in many Broadway shows. Against parental objections, she took a job with a stock company for seven months at Saranac Lake, New York, and then Hartford, Connecticut. Afterward, she moved to Boston, where she acted for a year with a theater group run by Edward E. Clive. In 1930 she appeared in the revue The Garrick Gaieties on Broadway in New York. There, she took voice lessons and had a brief career in opera, which was cut short because she had difficulty reaching high notes.

In 1933, Russell went to Los Angeles, where she was hired as a contract player for Universal Studios. When she first arrived on the lot, she was ignored by most of the crew and later told the press she felt terrible and humiliated at Universal, which affected her self-confidence. Unhappy with Universal's leadership and second-class studio status at the time, Russell set her sights on Metro-Goldwyn-Mayer and was able to get out of her Universal contract on her own terms without making any films. When MGM first approached her for a screen test, Russell was wary, remembering her experience at Universal. However, when she met MGM's Benny Thau and Ben Piazza, she was surprised; they were "the soul of understanding". Her screen test was directed by Harold S. Bucquet, and she later recalled that she was hired because of a closeup he took of her.

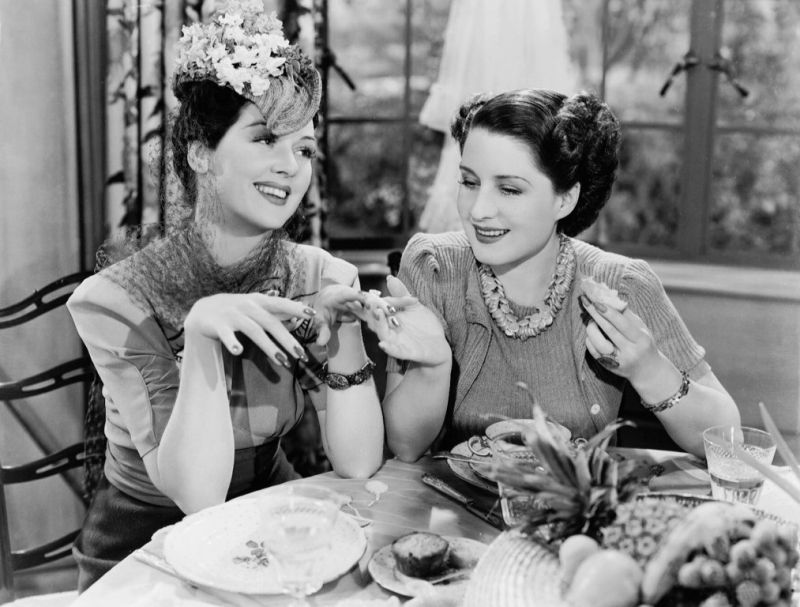
In The Women (1939) with Norma Shearer

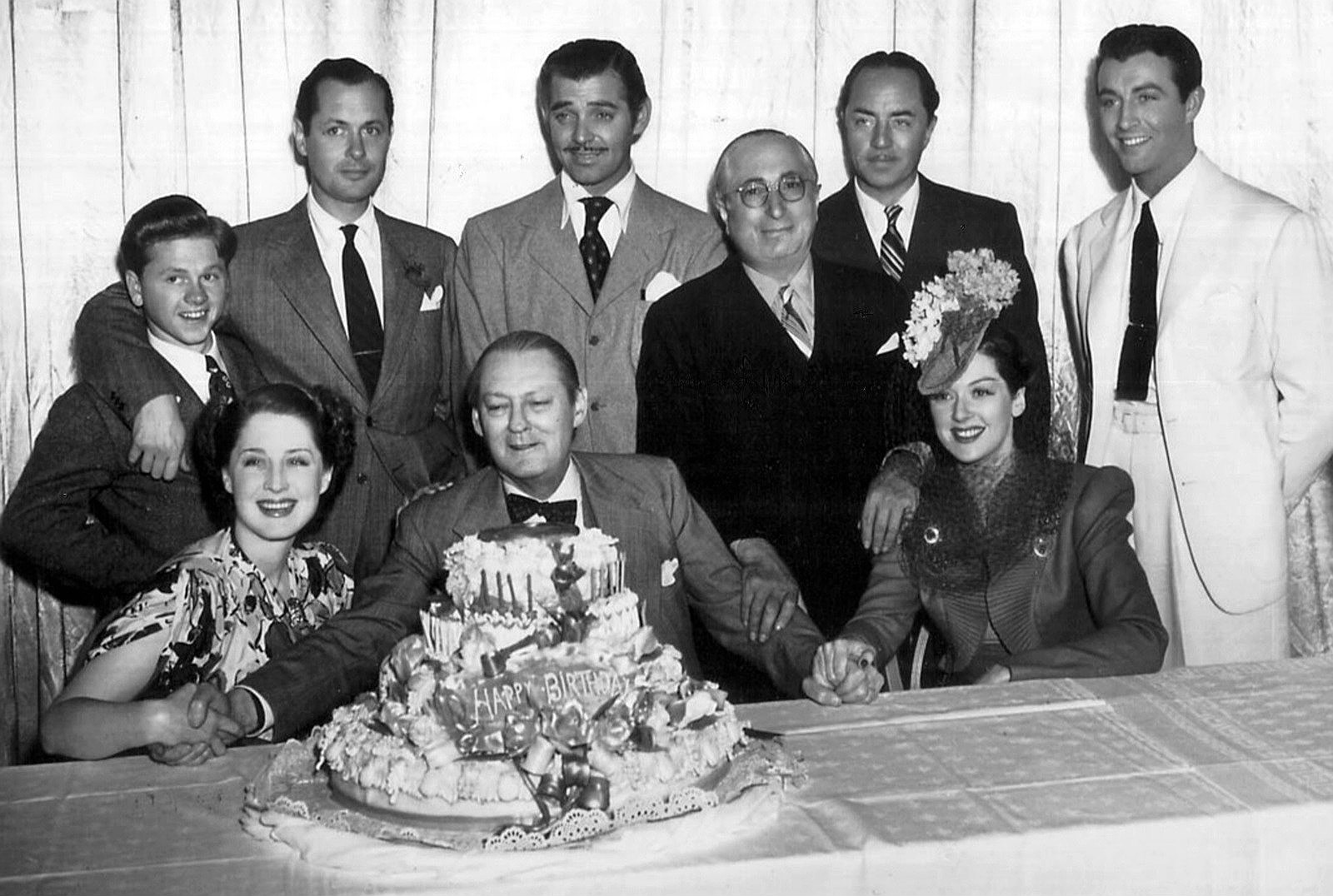
Lionel Barrymore's 61st birthday in 1939, standing: Mickey Rooney, Robert Montgomery, Clark Gable, Louis B. Mayer, William Powell, Robert Taylor, seated: Norma Shearer, Lionel Barrymore, and Rosalind Russell

Under contract to MGM, Russell made her film debut in Evelyn Prentice (1934). Although the role was small, she received good notices, with one critic saying that she was "convincing as the woman scorned". She starred in many comedies such as Forsaking All Others (1934) and Four's a Crowd (1938), as well as dramas, including Craig's Wife (1936) (the second of three film adaptations of the play of the same name; Joan Crawford starred in the third) and The Citadel (1938). Russell was acclaimed when she co-starred with Robert Young in the MGM drama West Point of the Air (1935). One critic wrote: "Rosalind Russell as the 'other woman' in the story gives an intelligent and deft handling to her scenes with Young." She quickly rose to fame, and by 1935, was seen as a replacement for actress Myrna Loy, as she took many roles for which Loy was initially set.

In her first years in Hollywood, Russell was characterized in both her personal life and her film career as a sophisticated "lady". This dissatisfied Russell, who said in a 1936 interview:

Being typed as a lady is the greatest misfortune possible to a motion picture actress. It limits your characterizations, confines you to play feminine sops and menaces and the public never highly approves of either. An impeccably dressed lady is always viewed with suspicion in real life and when you strut onto the screen with beautiful clothes and charming manners, the most naive of theatergoers senses immediately that you are in a position to do the hero no good. I earnestly want to get away from this. First, because I want to improve my career and professional life and, secondly because I am tired of being a clothes horse – a sort of hothouse orchid in a stand of wild flowers.

Russell approached director Frank Lloyd for help changing her image, but instead, Lloyd cast her as a wealthy aristocrat in Under Two Flags (1936). She was then cast as catty gossip Sylvia Fowler in the comedy The Women (1939), directed by George Cukor. The film was a major hit, boosting Russell's career and establishing her reputation as a comedienne.

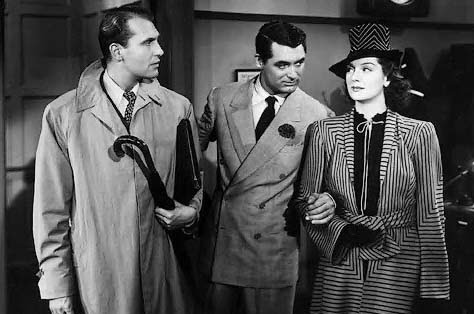
With Cary Grant and Ralph Bellamy in His Girl Friday (1940)

Russell continued to display her talent for comedy in the classic screwball comedy His Girl Friday (1940), directed by Howard Hawks. In the film, a reworking of Ben Hecht's story The Front Page, Russell plays quick-witted ace reporter Hildy Johnson, who is also the ex-wife of her newspaper editor Walter Burns (Cary Grant). Russell had been, as she put it, "Everyone's fifteenth choice" for the role of Hildy in the film. Before her being cast, Howard Hawks had asked Katharine Hepburn, Irene Dunne, Claudette Colbert, Jean Arthur, Margaret Sullavan, and Ginger Rogers if they would like to play the brash, fast-talking reporter in his film. All of them refused. Russell found out about this while riding on a train to New York, when she read an article in The New York Times stating that she had been cast in the film and listing all the actresses who had turned down the part.

=== Later career ===
In the early 1940s, Russell starred in the rom-coms The Feminine Touch (1941) and Take a Letter, Darling (1942). In Alexander Hall's comedy film My Sister Eileen (1942), she played older sister Ruth Sherwood. She received her first Academy Award nomination for My Sister Eileen. She then starred in Sister Kenny (1946), portraying real-life Sister Elizabeth Kenny, an Australian bush nurse who fought to help polio victims. She won her first Golden Globe and received her second Academy Award nomination. In Mourning Becomes Electra (1947), she plays a young New Englander who exacts vengeance after the murder of her father. She won her second Golden Globe and got her third Academy Award nomination; she was highly favored to win, to the point that Russell actually began to rise from her seat just before the winner's name was called. However, it was Loretta Young, and not Russell, who was named Best Actress, for her performance in The Farmer's Daughter. She followed up with the murder mystery The Velvet Touch (1948).

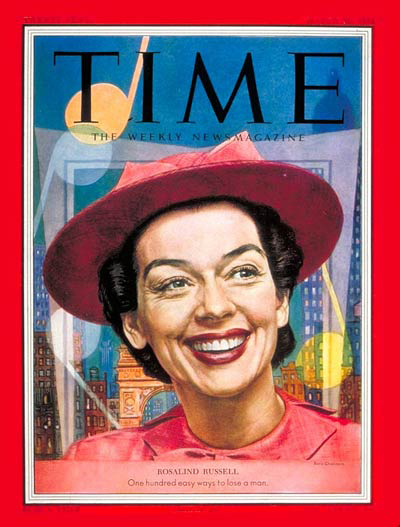
Rosalind Russell in Wonderful Town, on the cover of Time (March 30, 1953)

Russell returned to the stage with a touring production of Bell, Book and Candle. She then scored a big hit on Broadway with her Tony Award-winning performance in the musical Wonderful Town (1953), a musical version of her successful film of a decade earlier, My Sister Eileen. Russell reprised her starring role for a 1958 television special.

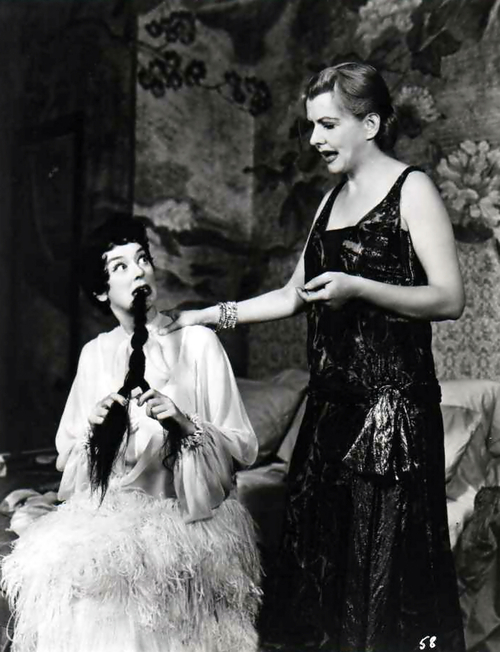
Rosalind Russell (left) and Polly Rowles in the original Broadway production of Auntie Mame (1957)

Perhaps her most memorable performance was in the title role of the long-running stage comedy Auntie Mame (based on a Patrick Dennis novel) as well as the 1958 film version, in which she played an eccentric aunt whose orphaned nephew comes to live with her. When asked with which role she was most closely identified, she replied that strangers who spotted her still called out, "Hey, Auntie Mame!". For the film version, she won the Laurel Award for Top Female Comedy Performance and her third Golden Globe, and received her first BAFTA nomination and fourth Academy Award nomination. For the stage version, she received a nomination for the Tony Award for Best Actress in a Play. Patrick Dennis dedicated his second Auntie Mame novel, Around the World with Auntie Mame, to "the one and only Rosalind Russell" in 1958.

She continued to appear in movies through the mid-1960s, including Picnic (1955), A Majority of One (1961), Five Finger Exercise (1962), Gypsy (1962, winning her fifth Golden Globe), The Trouble with Angels (1966), and its sequel, Where Angels Go, Trouble Follows (1968). Russell was the logical choice for reprising her role as Auntie Mame when the musical version Mame was set for a production on Broadway in 1966, but she declined for health reasons.

In addition to her acting career, Russell, under the name C. A. McKnight, also wrote the story for the film The Unguarded Moment (1956), a story of sexual harassment, starring Esther Williams. Russell used the pen name C. A. McKnight again in 1971, when she was credited as screenwriter for adapting the novel The Unexpected Mrs. Pollifax into the screenplay for Mrs. Pollifax-Spy, in which she also starred. It was Russell's last big screen role.

=== Awards and nominations ===
| Award | Year | Category | Work | Result |
|---|---|---|---|---|
| Academy Awards | 1943 | Best Actress | My Sister Eileen | Nominated |
| Academy Awards | 1947 | Best Actress | Sister Kenny | Nominated |
| Academy Awards | 1948 | Best Actress | Mourning Becomes Electra | Nominated |
| Academy Awards | 1959 | Best Actress | Auntie Mame | Nominated |
| Academy Awards | 1973 | Jean Hersholt Humanitarian Award | —N/a | Honored |
| BAFTA Awards | 1960 | Best Foreign Actress | Auntie Mame | Nominated |
| Golden Globe Awards | 1947 | Best Actress | Sister Kenny | Won |
| Golden Globe Awards | 1948 | Best Actress | Mourning Becomes Electra | Won |
| Golden Globe Awards | 1959 | Best Actress in a Motion Picture – Musical or Comedy | Auntie Mame | Won |
| Golden Globe Awards | 1962 | Best Actress in a Motion Picture – Musical or Comedy | A Majority of One | Won |
| Golden Globe Awards | 1963 | Best Actress in a Motion Picture – Musical or Comedy | Gypsy | Won |
| Tony Awards | 1953 | Best Actress in a Musical | Wonderful Town | Won |
| Tony Awards | 1957 | Best Actress in a Play | Auntie Mame | Nominated |
| Screen Actors Guild Awards | 1975 | Life Achievement Award | —N/a | Honored |

In 1972, Russell received the Golden Plate Award of the American Academy of Achievement. She also has a star on the Hollywood Walk of Fame.

Russell is honored at the Rosalind Russell Medical Research Center for Arthritis. Her portrait and a description of her work hang in the lobby, as Congress made a grant in 1979 to establish the research center, in honor of her Congressional appointment to the National Commission on Arthritis.

== Personal life ==
On October 25, 1941, Russell married Danish-American producer Frederick Brisson (1912–1984), son of actor Carl Brisson. Cary Grant was responsible for the couple's having met and was best man at their wedding. Brisson had been traveling from England to the United States by ship in 1939, and The Women was playing on an endless loop during the voyage. After hearing the audio for the film day after day while traveling, Brisson decided he had better sit down and watch the whole film. He became so enamored with Russell's performance as Sylvia Fowler that he turned to his friends and proclaimed, "I'm either gonna kill that girl, or I'm gonna marry her."

Brisson stayed with Cary Grant in his guest house while Grant was filming His Girl Friday. Upon hearing that Grant was making the movie with Russell, Brisson asked his friend if he could meet her. Grant then spent weeks greeting Russell each morning on set with the question "Have you met Freddie Brisson?" in an effort to pique the actress's curiosity. One night, when Russell opened her door to let Grant in before they went dancing, as they often did, she found him standing next to a stranger. Grant sheepishly explained that the odd fellow was Brisson, the man whom he had mentioned so often, and they set off for dinner, with Brisson in tow.

Russell and Brisson were married for 35 years, until her death. They had one child in 1943, son Carl Lance Brisson.

In 1961, Russell had a mastectomy. She also suffered from rheumatoid arthritis which later led her to withdraw from active acting work.

Russell was a registered Republican who supported Richard Nixon's 1960 presidential campaign. President Nixon appointed Russell to the National Council on the Arts in August 1972.

Russell was a devout Catholic and a member of the Good Shepherd Parish and the Catholic Motion Picture Guild in Beverly Hills, California.

== Death ==
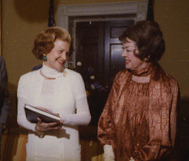
Six months before her death, Russell meets with First Lady Betty Ford (herself a breast cancer survivor) at the White House on May 11, 1976

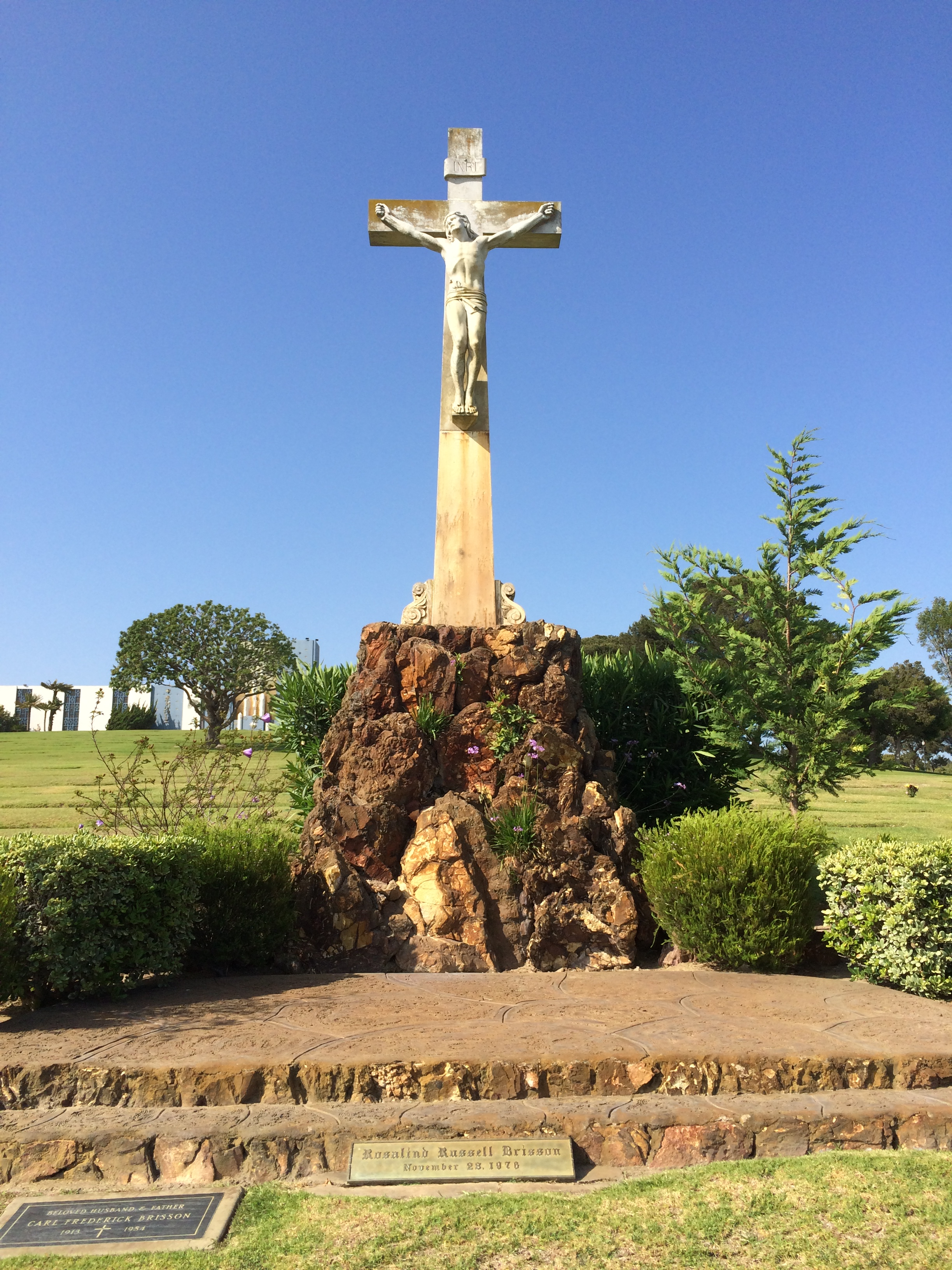
Grave of Rosalind Russell at Holy Cross Cemetery

Russell died of breast cancer on November 28, 1976. She is buried in Holy Cross Cemetery in Culver City, California.

Russell has a star on the Hollywood Walk of Fame in the 1700 block of Vine Street.

Her autobiography Life Is a Banquet, written with Chris Chase, was published a year after her death. The foreword, written by her husband, states that Russell had a mental breakdown in 1943. She did not act in films in 1944. Details are scant, but the book indicates that health problems and the deaths of a sister and a brother were major factors leading to her breakdown. Russell had rheumatoid arthritis, and an arthritis research center at the University of California, San Francisco bears her name.

In 2009, the documentary film Life Is a Banquet: The Life of Rosalind Russell, narrated by Kathleen Turner, was shown at film festivals across the United States and on some PBS stations.

== Work - acting and voice credits ==
=== Film ===
| Year | Title | Role | Notes |
|---|---|---|---|
| 1934 | Evelyn Prentice | Mrs. Nancy Harrison | |
| 1934 | The President Vanishes | Sally Voorman | |
| 1934 | Forsaking All Others | Eleanor | |
| 1935 | The Night Is Young | Countess Zarika Rafay | |
| 1935 | The Casino Murder Case | Doris | |
| 1935 | West Point of the Air | Dare Marshall | |
| 1935 | Reckless | Jo | |
| 1935 | China Seas | Sybil Barclay | |
| 1935 | Rendezvous | Joel Carter | |
| 1936 | It Had to Happen | Beatrice Newnes | |
| 1936 | Under Two Flags | Lady Venetia Cunningham | |
| 1936 | Trouble for Two | Miss Vandeleur | |
| 1936 | Craig's Wife | Harriet Craig | |
| 1937 | Night Must Fall | Olivia Grayne | |
| 1937 | Live, Love and Learn | Julie Stoddard | |
| 1938 | Man-Proof | Elizabeth Kent | |
| 1938 | Four's a Crowd | Jean Christy | |
| 1938 | The Citadel | Christine Barlow | |
| 1939 | Fast and Loose | Garda Sloane | |
| 1939 | The Women | Sylvia Fowler | |
| 1940 | His Girl Friday | Hildy Johnson | |
| 1940 | Hired Wife | Kendal Browning | |
| 1940 | No Time for Comedy | Linda Esterbrook | |
| 1940 | This Thing Called Love | Ann Winters | |
| 1941 | They Met in Bombay | Anya Von Duren | |
| 1941 | The Feminine Touch | Julie Hathaway | |
| 1941 | Design for Scandal | Judge Cornelia C. Porter | |
| 1942 | Take a Letter, Darling | A.M. MacGregor | |
| 1942 | My Sister Eileen | Ruth Sherwood | Nominated - Academy Award for Best Actress |
| 1943 | Flight for Freedom | Tonie Carter | |
| 1943 | What a Woman! | Carol Ainsley | |
| 1945 | Roughly Speaking | Louise Randall Pierson | |
| 1945 | She Wouldn't Say Yes | Dr. Susan A. Lane | |
| 1946 | Sister Kenny | Elizabeth Kenny | Golden Globe Award for Best Actress in a Motion Picture – Drama; Nominated - Academy Award for Best Actress |
| 1947 | The Guilt of Janet Ames | Janet Ames | |
| 1947 | Mourning Becomes Electra | Lavinia Mannon | Golden Globe Award for Best Actress in a Motion Picture – Drama; Nominated - Academy Award for Best Actress |
| 1948 | The Velvet Touch | Valerie Stanton | |
| 1949 | Tell It to the Judge | Marsha Meredith | |
| 1950 | A Woman of Distinction | Susan Manning Middlecott | |
| 1953 | Never Wave at a WAC | Jo McBain | |
| 1955 | The Girl Rush | Kim Halliday | |
| 1955 | Picnic | Miss Rosemary Sydney | |
| 1958 | Auntie Mame | Mame Dennis | Golden Globe Award for Best Actress - Motion Picture Musical or Comedy; Laurel Award for Top Female Comedy Performance; Nominated - Academy Award for Best Actress; Nominated - BAFTA Award for Best Foreign Actress |
| 1961 | A Majority of One | Mrs. Bertha Jacoby | Golden Globe Award for Best Actress - Motion Picture Musical or Comedy |
| 1962 | Five Finger Exercise | Louise Harington | |
| 1962 | Gypsy | Rose Hovick | Golden Globe Award for Best Actress - Motion Picture Musical or Comedy; Laurel Award for Top Female Musical Performance (5th place) |
| 1966 | The Trouble with Angels | Mother Superior | Laurel Award for Top Female Comedy Performance (4th place) |
| 1967 | Oh Dad, Poor Dad, Mamma's Hung You in the Closet and I'm Feelin' So Sad | Madame Rosepettle | |
| 1967 | Rosie! | Rosie Lord | |
| 1968 | Where Angels Go, Trouble Follows | Mother Superior | |
| 1971 | Mrs. Pollifax-Spy | Mrs. Emily Pollifax | Also screenwriter, credited as "C. A. McKnight"; Last film role |

=== Television ===
| Year | Title | Role | Notes |
|---|---|---|---|
| 1951 | Schlitz Playhouse of Stars | Guest | episode: Never Wave at a WAC |
| 1953 | What's My Line? | Mystery Guest | Air date: January 4, 1953 |
| 1955 | The Loretta Young Show | Guest Hostess | episode: Week-End in Winnetka episode: Fear Me Not |
| 1956 | General Electric Theater | Cynthia | episode: The Night Goes On |
| 1958 | Wonderful Town | Ruth Sherwood | TV movie |
| 1959 | Startime | Host | episode: The Wonderful World of Entertainment |
| 1972 | The Crooked Hearts | Laurita Dorsey | TV movie Last appearance in any medium |

=== Broadway theatre ===
| Production Dates | Title | Role | Genre | Notes |
|---|---|---|---|---|
| October 16, 1930 – October 1930 | The Garrick Gaieties | Performer | Musical revue | |
| April 20, 1931 – April 1931 | Company's Coming | Miss Mallory | Comedy | |
| February 25, 1953 – July 3, 1954 | Wonderful Town | Ruth Sherwood | Musical | Tony Award for Best Actress in a Musical |
| October 31, 1956 – June 28, 1958 | Auntie Mame | Auntie Mame | Comedy | Nominated - Tony Award for Best Actress in a Play |

=== Radio appearances ===
| Year | Program | Episode/Source |
|---|---|---|
| 1939 | Lux Radio Theatre | Stage Door role of Terry |
| 1940 | Screen Guild Players | Ninotchka |
| 1941 | Lux Radio Theatre | Craig's Wife |
| 1951 | Screen Directors Playhouse | Take a Letter, Darling |
| 1952 | Theatre Guild on the Air | The Damask Cheek |
