= S. Schwab Company =

S. Schwab
- Company type: Private corporation
- Industry: Apparel
- Founded: 1915
- Founder: Sam Schwab
- Headquarters: Cumberland, Maryland, New York, NY, USA
- Products: Clothing for infants and toddlers

S. Schwab Company was an apparel design and marketing company specializing in high-end clothing for infants and toddlers. The company was known for its "Little Me" branded clothing line sold in many large department stores such as Macy's, Nordstrom, and Lord & Taylor.

== History ==
S. Schwab Company was started by Sam Schwab who immigrated to the US from France in the early 1900s to New York. Schwab later started a clothing manufacturing business in the city of New York City, NY selling imported shawls, sweaters and other garments that were further enhanced in Cumberland using hand embroidery technique famous in Alsace, France. Sam Schwab moved to Cumberland, MD. from NYC in 1924 to expand the business. After World War II, Schwab's son's Richard and Leonard joined their mother Sylvia, the business and the company invested in a full-fledged manufacturing operation in the Cumberland Maryland.

In 1984, the company transitioned away from local manufacturing toward product development, marketing, and branding.

In 1995, S. Schwab Company acquired a license to produce the Ralph Lauren infants and toddlers clothing line.

In 1999, Ralph Lauren awarded the entire children's wear license for boys' and girls' apparel to the S. Schwab Company for both the United States and many other countries around the world. The company initially distributed the RL product in Cumberland and later moved distribution to Martinsburg, WV. All sales, marketing and design services were performed in New York City.

In 2004, Ralph Lauren bought the license back from S. Schwab Co. for approximately $230 million, plus approximately $20 million in "contingent and deferred payments".

On Oct 31, 2007, S.Schwab Company sold the assets of its Little Me children's wear wholesale business to Mamiye Brothers, Inc. The sale includes the Little Me trademark and all assets related of the wholesale business. In addition, all 37 of the 'Little Me outlet and specialty stores' were liquidated by Great American Group.
