= Polly Rowles =

American actress

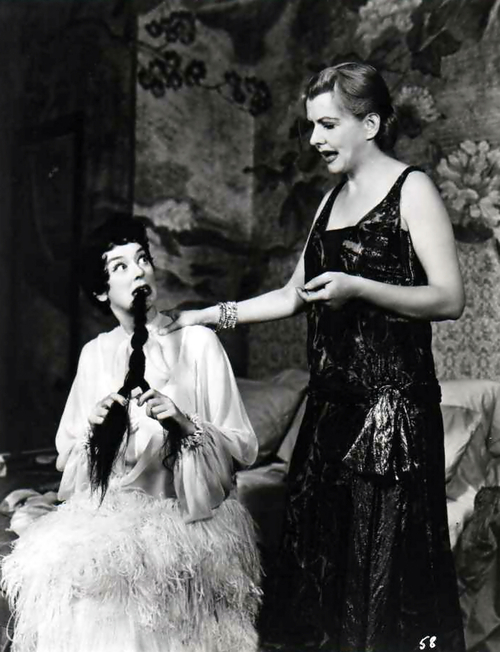
- Rosalind Russell (left) and Polly Rowles in the original Broadway production of Auntie Mame (1957)
- Born: Mary Elizabeth Rowles; January 10, 1914; Philadelphia, Pennsylvania, U.S.
- Died: October 7, 2001 (aged 87); Concord, New Hampshire, U.S.
- Education: Carnegie Institute of Technology
- Occupation: Actress
- Spouse: Frank Snyder

Mary Elizabeth "Polly" Rowles (January 10, 1914 – October 7, 2001) was an American actress.

== Early years ==
Born in Philadelphia, Pennsylvania, Rowles was the daughter of Mr. and Mrs. Ralph T. Rowles. Her father was a steel executive, and her grandfather was an actor. She graduated from Carnegie Institute of Technology. While Rowles was at Carnegie Tech, she appeared in 30 plays, often in leading roles. She gained additional acting experience with the Pittsburgh Little Theatre, where Ben Iden Payne was the director. She was signed to make films for Universal based on the recommendation of Carnegie Tech's school of drama.

== Career ==
Rowles's film debut came in Love Letters of a Star. Universal executives declined to pick up Rowles's option after her first year, attributing the decision to her right eye, which she said was slightly smaller than the left as a result of a childhood injury. They had ordered an operation on the eye but let her go anyway. She worked as a freelance actress, including making a film with Gene Autry, but then decided that she could put her dramatic training to better use on stage, so she headed east to Broadway.

Rowles performed in such films and television series as The Defenders, Sweet Liberty and Power. Rowles portrayed Laurie in the Jamie TV series. Television work included soap opera characters in roles on The Nurses, Somerset, and The Edge of Night. During the 1980s, Rowles was also known as Inspector No. 12 in a series of television commercials for Hanes underwear.

Rowles's Broadway debut came in Julius Caesar (1938). She also appeared as Vera Charles in the original Broadway production of Auntie Mame (1956–1958) with Rosalind Russell in the title role. Rowles also acted on stage in the Strand Theatre in London in Dark Eyes (1948).

Rowles had a program that was "an early version of talk radio" on KDKA in Pittsburgh.

== Personal life and death ==
Rowles was married to Frank Snyder, and she had a daughter. On October 7, 2001, Rowles died at a nursing home in Concord, New Hampshire, aged 87.

== Selected filmography ==
- Alfred Hitchcock Presents (1956) (Season 1 Episode 17: "The Older Sister") as Nell Cutts
