= The Mary Tyler Moore Hour =

Television series

- Genre: Sitcom-variety show
- Written by: David Axlerod; Stan Burns; Garry Ferrier; Peter Gallay; Carol Gary; Robert Illes; Gary Jacobs; Coslough Johnson; Patricia Jones; Pat Proft; Donald Reiker; Mary-David Sheiner; Larry Siegel; James Stein; Aubrey Tadman; Sheila Judis Weisberg; Arnie Kogen
- Directed by: Jay Sandrich; Robert Scheerer; Walter C. Miller; Noam Pitlik
- Starring: Mary Tyler Moore; Dody Goodman; Michael Keaton; Joyce Van Patten; Ron Rifkin; Doris Roberts
- Theme music composer: Sonny Curtis
- Opening theme: "Love Is All Around" (instrumental)
- Composer: Alf Clausen
- Country of origin: United States
- Original language: English
- No. of seasons: 1
- No. of episodes: 11

Production
- Producer: Perry Lafferty
- Production locations: CBS Television City; Hollywood, California
- Camera setup: Multi-camera
- Running time: 60 minutes
- Production company: MTM Enterprises

Original release
- Network: CBS
- Release: March 4 – June 10, 1979

The Mary Tyler Moore Hour is an American sitcom-variety show starring Mary Tyler Moore, Dody Goodman, Michael Keaton, and Joyce Van Patten that aired on CBS from March 4, 1979, to June 10, 1979, with a total of 11 episodes spanning over one season.

== Overview ==
In the spring of 1979, nearly five months following the negative reception of her first venture in a variety show entitled Mary which CBS pulled from its schedule after only three broadcasts, Mary Tyler Moore returned to CBS with this new short-lived series; it was part situation comedy and part variety show, using a show-within-a-show format that centered on the problems encountered in putting a variety series together.

Moore stars as Mary McKinnon, the host of a fictional weekly variety series called The Mary McKinnon Show. McKinnon is a well-established star of comedy who could also sing and dance. Also seen were her long time personal secretary-companion Iris Chapman (Joyce Van Patten), her writer-director Artie Miller (Ron Rifkin), her producer Harry Sinclair (Michael Lombard), her studio page Kenneth Christy (Michael Keaton), her housekeepers Ruby (Dody Goodman) and Crystal (Doris Roberts), and her head writer Mort Zimmick (Bobby Ramsen).

In addition to these regulars, major stars appeared as themselves in the guise of being guest stars on the fictional McKinnon program, including Lucille Ball, Beatrice Arthur, Nancy Walker, Linda Lavin, Bonnie Franklin, Ken Howard, Mike Douglas, Gene Kelly, Hal Linden, Johnny Mathis, Paul Williams and Dick Van Dyke.

== Cast ==
- Mary Tyler Moore as Mary McKinnon
- Dody Goodman as Ruby Bell (Mary's housekeeper)
- Michael Keaton as Kenneth Christy (Mary's studio page)
- Ron Rifkin as Artie Diller (Mary's writer-director)
- Joyce Van Patten as Iris Chapman (Mary's personal secretary)
- Michael Lombard as Harry Sinclair (Mary's producer)
- Doris Roberts as Crystal (Mary's housekeeper)
- Bobby Ramsen as Mort Zimmick (Mary's head writer)
- David Letterman (various roles)
- Florence Halop as Estelle (Harry's unseen secretary)

== Theme music ==
Despite having no narrative connection to her earlier sitcom The Mary Tyler Moore Show, The Mary Tyler Moore Hour featured an instrumental version of that sitcom's theme music.

== Episodes ==
No.	Guest(s)	Directed by	Original release date	Tape Date
1	Lucille Ball and Mike Douglas	Robert Scheerer	March 4, 1979	TBA
Mary tries to get Lucille Ball to appear on her show on short notice when her scheduled guest suddenly becomes ill. Although Lucy wants to do the show, she must first get talk-show host Mike Douglas' permission to be absent the following day, as she is contracted to be his co-host for the week. Mary and Lucy decide to ask Douglas for his consent on live television.
2	Beatrice Arthur	Robert Scheerer	March 11, 1979	TBA
Mary has two guests on her show – the militant Beatrice Arthur and Benny Baxter (Howard Morris), a washed-up vaudevillian comic. During rehearsals, Bea takes over Mary's dressing room and orders everyone about, including Benny and Mary, by assuming the same bustling, take-charge type character she portrayed in her CBS sitcom Maude.
3	Bonnie Franklin and Henny Youngman	Robert Scheerer	March 18, 1979	February 2, 1979
Bonnie Franklin and Henny Youngman are Mary's guests, but The Mary McKinnon Show may not go on because Mary and Bonnie are held up in night court when they are arrested for jaywalking while dashing across the street from the studio. Meanwhile, at the taping, pandemonium reigns when they fail to return and nobody knows where they are.
4	Dick Van Dyke	Jay Sandrich	March 25, 1979	January 1979
Mary is worried when a brushfire nears her California home and she may be forced to evacuate. At the same time, Dick Van Dyke meets the show's creative team to mull over ideas for a possible guest appearance and they fantasize about what a sketch of The Dick Van Dyke Show would look like on Rob and Laura Petrie's 50th wedding anniversary.
5	Gene Kelly	Robert Scheerer	April 1, 1979	December 1, 1978
Mary is nervous about performing with her upcoming guest, Gene Kelly. During rehearsals, Mary pulls her back out and is unable to continue. She expresses her disappointment to Gene, and he says he cannot do the dance without her and asks for her help. As she shows him the steps, her back seems to heal. They rehearse and their performance goes on without a hitch.
6	Johnny Mathis	Robert Scheerer	April 8, 1979	TBA
Mary welcomes Johnny Mathis on The Mary McKinnon Show and an uninvited guest – her goddaughter Mary Ellen (Claudia Lonow), a stage-struck 16-year-old who hopes to make it big in Hollywood with a little help from Mary. Lisa Whelchel appears as "Gail Connors", another young hopeful with a pushy stage mother (Beverly Sanders).
7	Ken Howard	Walter C. Miller	April 15, 1979	March 23, 1979
Mary is plagued by guilt when guest star Ken Howard makes calamitous purchases of a house and a car at her urging. Meanwhile, her longtime personal assistant Iris quits her position to pursue a career in real estate and is replaced by overly officious corporate secretary Arlene Hoffman (Ruth Manning). Katey Sagal appears as "Julie Markenheim".
8	Hal Linden	Noam Pitlik	April 22, 1979	TBA
Guest Hal Linden acts as peacemaker when Mary has a falling out with producer Harry Sinclair (Michael Lombard) over a misquote in a gossip column.
9	Linda Lavin	Robert Scheerer	April 29, 1979	TBA
Mary and guest Linda Lavin are distracted during their performance by a televised award ceremony on which they are competing in the same category. David Letterman appears as Linda's press agent, "Gus Kirkwood". Morty Gunty also performs.
10	Nancy Walker	Robert Scheerer	May 6, 1979	February 9, 1979
Nancy Walker becomes a candidate to fill a vacancy on the board of the Actors League, thereby driving everyone on The Mary McKinnon Show to utter distraction. When she receives news of her victory, Nancy insists on everyone following the rules and regulations of the actor's union to the letter which results in rehearsal chaos for Mary.
11	Paul Williams	Jay Sandrich	June 10, 1979	January 12, 1979
Paul Williams is Mary's guest and trouble ensues as they try to find an actress to play a waitress for one of the sketches. Harry becomes smitten with actress Pam Medford who is auditioning for the role, however, her acting is a bit too intense. When Iris asks how hard is it to recite a line which she does effortlessly, she surprises everyone and ends up with the role.

== Reception ==
The show's premise was to give the audience a fictionalized view into the life of the star of a television variety show, much as The Jack Benny Program had purported to do two decades earlier on the same network. Unlike the Benny show, or Moore's sitcoms, but more like her earlier variety show the previous fall, The Mary Tyler Moore Hour would have trouble attracting a sizable audience. It ranked 54th out of 114 shows that season with an average 17.0/29 rating/share.

The Mary Tyler Moore Hour premiered on March 4 and was cancelled after its June 10 broadcast and 11 episodes. Moore announced plans to return in a new sitcom in the fall of 1980, but instead turned to Broadway, where she starred in a revival of Whose Life Is It Anyway? (winning a special 1980 Tony Award for her performance of a role originally played by Tom Conti), and then went back to Hollywood, where she played the emotionally crippled mother in the acclaimed film Ordinary People, directed by Robert Redford, for which she was nominated for an Academy Award for Best Actress. Moore did not return to series television and the sitcom format until the fall of 1985, with a sitcom entitled Mary.
