= Auntie Mame =

Book by Patrick Dennis

- First edition cover
- Author: Patrick Dennis
- Language: English
- Publisher: Vanguard Press
- Publication date: January 21, 1955
- Publication place: United States
- Media type: Print (hardback and paperback)
- Pages: 280
- Followed by: Around the World with Auntie Mame

Auntie Mame: An Irreverent Escapade is a 1955 novel by American author Patrick Dennis chronicling the madcap adventures of a boy, Patrick, growing up as the ward of his Aunt Mame Dennis, the sister of his dead father.

The book is often described as having been inspired by Dennis' real-life eccentric aunt, Marion Tanner, whose life and outlook mirrored those of Mame, but Dennis denied the connection. The novel was a runaway bestseller, setting records on the New York Times bestseller list, with more than 2 million copies in print during its initial publication. It became the basis of a stage play, a film, a stage musical, and a film musical.

In 1958, Dennis wrote a sequel titled Around the World with Auntie Mame.

== Stage adaptations ==
The novel was adapted for the stage by Jerome Lawrence and Robert E. Lee. Running from October 31, 1956, to June 28, 1958, at the Broadhurst Theatre, the original Broadway production starred Rosalind Russell in the title role. The original Broadway cast also included Robert Allen as Mr. Babcock, Yuki Shimoda as Ito, Robert Smith as Beau, Polly Rowles as Vera Charles, Jan Handzlik as young Patrick and Peggy Cass as Agnes Gooch. In 1957, both Russell and Cass were nominated for Tony Awards, and Cass won the award. A West Coast touring production, starring Eve Arden in the title role and Benay Venuta as Vera Charles, ran from August 4 to December 13, 1958, with stops at San Diego, Los Angeles and San Francisco.

In 1966, a musical version of the story, titled Mame, starring Angela Lansbury and Bea Arthur, opened on Broadway.

== Film adaptations ==
In December 1958, a film of the same title based on the play was released by Warner Brothers with Russell, Shimoda, Handzlik and Cass reprising their roles. Russell and Cass were both nominated for an Academy Award, and Russell won a Golden Globe for her portrayal.

In 1974, the musical version was made into a film of the same title starring Lucille Ball, Bea Arthur (reprising her stage role), and Robert Preston. This film was a failure at the box office—despite breaking attendance records during its Radio City Music Hall run—and critics generally panned it for Ball's singing ability and thought she was not up to the part (she was 62 years old).

== Re-issues ==
In September 2001, the book was re-released in paperback by Broadway Books, an imprint of Random House.

In 2009, the Italian publisher Adelphi re-released the book, which had been out of print for many years in its Italian translation, under the title Zia Mame; the book reached the top spot on Italian bestseller lists and stayed there for many weeks, an unusual performance for a re-release.
