= Johnny Midnight (TV series) =

- Genre: Crime drama
- Created by: Liam O'Brien
- Directed by: Robert Stevens; John English; David Orrick McDearmon
- Starring: Edmond O'Brien; Arthur Batanides; Barney Phillips; Yuki Shimoda
- Narrated by: Edmond O'Brien
- Opening theme: "Lullaby of Broadway" performed by Joe Bushkin
- Composers: Gerald Fried; Joe Bushkin; Richard Shores
- Country of origin: United States
- Original language: English
- No. of seasons: 1
- No. of episodes: 39

Production
- Producer: Jack Chertok
- Cinematography: Ellsworth Fredricks; Bud Thackery; Irving Lippman; John F. Warren; Ray Cory; Benjamin H. Kline; Neal Beckner
- Editor: Sam E. Waxman
- Camera setup: Single-camera
- Running time: 22–24 minutes
- Production companies: Midnight Productions; Revue Studios

Original release
- Network: Syndication
- Release: January 3 – September 21, 1960

Johnny Midnight is an American crime drama that aired for one season in syndication from January 3, 1960, to September 21, 1960. The series stars Edmond O'Brien as the titular character.

== Synopsis ==
O'Brien portrayed Johnny Midnight, a New York City actor turned private detective. Midnight's cases frequently focused upon Times Square and Broadway, where he had triumphed earlier on stage. Midnight lives in a Manhattan penthouse at Broadway and West 41st Street and owns The Midnight Theater. He often eats at Lindy's Bar, which enables him to maintain contact with his friends from show business. In addition to taking on individual clients, he often investigates cases for the Mutual Insurance Company. His acting experience sometimes helps when he uses a disguise during an investigation.

O'Brien said that he took the role after turning down other offers to star in TV series because the show "had a concept and setting totally different from anything in the mystery-adventure field. It was a story about the real drama of life as contrasted with Broadway play life." The theme song of the series is "Lullaby of Broadway", performed by Joe Bushkin.

The supporting cast included Arthur Batanides as Sergeant Lupo Olvera, Barney Phillips as Lieutenant Sam Geller, and Yuki Shimoda as Uki, Midnight's wise-cracking Japanese manservant.

== Production notes ==
Jack Chertok produced the program, prior to his association with the sitcom My Favorite Martian. O'Brien's brother, Liam, originated the premise for the program.
