= Jan Handzlik =

American former child actor (born 1945)

- Born: 21 September 1945 (age 80)
- Education: University of Southern California (BA); University of California, Los Angeles (JD)
- Occupations: Actor, attorney

Jan Lawrence Handzlik (born 21 September 1945) is an American lawyer and former child actor best known for playing young Patrick Dennis in the 1958 film Auntie Mame.

== Acting career ==
Handzlik's mother Jean was a Broadway actress and opera singer. As a young child, Handzlik lived in Weehawken, New Jersey. His first major acting role was as the young Patrick Dennis in the Auntie Mame Broadway play, which opened in 1956. Handzlik was chosen from hundreds of boys for the part. He subsequently reprised his role in the 1958 film adaptation, which was nominated for five Oscars.

In 1961, he played Tommy in The Twilight Zone episode The Monsters Are Due on Maple Street. He also appeared in an episode of the Camera Three anthology series.

== Legal career ==
After retiring from acting, Handzlik became a lawyer in Los Angeles, California, working as a federal prosecutor before becoming a white collar criminal defense attorney. He served as chair of the American Bar Association's National White Collar Crime Committee. Notable clients he has represented include Steven Seagal, Stanley "Tookie" Williams, Joe Francis and Florian Homm.

== Personal life ==
Handzlik married Barbara Jean Handzlik. Their daughter Anna married lawyer and political commentator Jordan Sekulow.
