= Around the World with Auntie Mame =

1958 novel by Patrick Dennis

- First edition publ. Harcourt Brace
- Author: Patrick Dennis
- Language: English
- Genre: Fiction
- Published: 1958
- Publisher: Harcourt Brace
- Publication place: United States
- Media type: Print (hardback and paperback)
- Pages: 286 pages
- Preceded by: Auntie Mame

Around the World with Auntie Mame (1958) is a novel by Patrick Dennis and sequel to his bestseller Auntie Mame.

== Plot ==
Narrator "Patrick" is seventeen, and has left his private prep school. His Auntie Mame takes him with her on an extended tour of Europe, which becomes a round-the-world tour before his enrollment in college. They have adventures in Paris, London, Biarritz, Venice, Austria, Russia, Lebanon, and the high seas, meeting and dealing with British nobles, con men, embarrassing relatives, Nazis, and gunrunners before they arrive home again. Much of the action is a slyly satirical commentary on such things as the practice of "presenting at Court," fashionable political activism, the naivete of some Americans abroad, and the ways in which small communities of expatriates often end up behaving.

The main story is encased in a "frame" narrative, in which Patrick, now grown and married, tries to placate his wife with highly edited tales from his travels with his aunt. This takes up where the original novel, Auntie Mame, left off, with Patrick's son Michael going off to India with Mame promising to have him home by Labor Day. Two years have passed, with no word beyond a few random post cards. Each chapter begins with Patrick's reassuring, off-hand comments about his journeys with Mame, and then continues with him narrating what really happened.

== Critical reception ==
The New York Times, "Amiably spurious and sportive memoirs."

New York Herald Tribune, "As extravagantly full of gags, slapstick comedy, and general hilarious confusion as its predecessor."

Chicago Tribune, "Indescribably funny."

New York Post, "Funnier than the first book."

Time, "There is no important difference between Auntie Mame, which sold 1,500,000 copies, and Around the World. Biggest change: in the starting novel Mame Dennis gets married; in the sequel she just gets around."

== Trivia ==
The novels of Patrick Dennis fell out of fashion for many years, but his best sellers were reprinted in 2003, with forewords and other commentary by present-day humorists and the author's son. Around the World with Auntie Mame was reprinted with the restoration of a chapter that had been censored from the original edition. The chapter tells of Auntie Mame's and Patrick's time on a collective farm in the USSR. The publisher felt the chapter, however satirical, would not be acceptable coming, as the novel did, at the height of the Red Scare.
