= Auntie Mame (film) =

1958 film

- Theatrical release poster
- Directed by: Morton DaCosta
- Screenplay by: Betty Comden; Adolph Green
- Based on: Auntie Mame; 1955 novel by Patrick Dennis Auntie Mame; 1956 play by: Jerome Lawrence; Robert Edwin Lee
- Produced by: Morton DaCosta
- Starring: Rosalind Russell; Forrest Tucker; Coral Browne; Roger Smith; Peggy Cass; Jan Handzlik; Joanna Barnes; Robin Hughes; Pippa Scott
- Cinematography: Harry Stradling
- Edited by: William H. Ziegler
- Music by: Bronislau Kaper
- Distributed by: Warner Bros. Pictures
- Release dates: December 4, 1958 (Radio City Music Hall); December 27, 1958 (US)
- Running time: 143 minutes
- Country: United States
- Language: English
- Box office: $23.3 million

Auntie Mame is a 1958 American Technirama Technicolor comedy film based on the 1955 novel of the same name by Edward Everett Tanner III (under the pseudonym Patrick Dennis) and the 1956 play of the same name by Jerome Lawrence and Robert Edwin Lee. This film version stars Rosalind Russell and was directed by Morton DaCosta.

== Plot ==
Patrick Dennis, orphaned in 1928 when his father Edwin dies unexpectedly, is placed in the care of his aunt, Mame Dennis, in Manhattan. Mame is flamboyant and exuberant, hosting frequent parties with a variety of guests and free-spirited friends, including the frequently drunk actress Vera Charles; Acacius Page, who runs a progressive school with nudist exercises; and Lindsay Woolsey, a book publisher and devoted suitor. Quickly becoming maternal toward Patrick, Mame aims to give him as broad a view of life as possible. Patrick's inheritance is managed by Dwight Babcock, a trustee of the highly conservative Knickerbocker Bank, who was appointed in Edwin's will to restrain Mame's liberal influence. Without Babcock's knowledge, Mame enrolls Patrick in Page's school. When this is discovered, Babcock forcibly enrolls Patrick into his own alma mater boarding school, preventing Mame from seeing her nephew except during holidays and the summer.

When Mame is bankrupted by the 1929 stock market crash, she tries acting with Vera, but Mame's overacting to enhance a small role causes a debacle. She then takes a series of jobs which end disastrously. During one job as a Macy's salesgirl, Mame meets Southern oil baron Beauregard Jackson Pickett Burnside, who seeks her out to relieve her distress when she is fired due to her ineptitude on his large toy order to orphans. Both are smitten, and Beau invites Mame to his estate, where his erstwhile fiancée, Sally Cato MacDougall, makes an attempt on Mame's life by maneuvering her onto an unmanageable horse. Mame and Beauregard are married, travelling around the world on an extensive honeymoon. Mame continues to exchange letters with Patrick, indicating Babcock is influencing him into a more conventional personality, and Patrick joins them periodically. After Beau dies while climbing the Matterhorn in 1937, Mame, now a rich widow, comes home after a prolonged period of mourning to discover the now-adult Patrick has given her a dictaphone, typewriter, and secretary, Agnes Gooch. He, Vera, and Lindsay persuade Mame to write her autobiography but arrange for a collaborator/ghostwriter, Brian O'Bannion, who rapidly proves to be a fortune hunter.

Patrick announces to Mame that he is engaged to Gloria Upson, a girl approved by Babcock from a "restricted" community in Connecticut called Mountebank. Initially angered by the change in Patrick's character, Mame relents to please him. She also sabotages O'Bannion's attempted wooing by sending Agnes to a party in her place, lying to O'Bannion that Agnes is a secret heiress. When an inebriated Agnes returns, she barely remembers the evening; she thinks they saw a movie with a wedding scene and that O'Bannion was keen to meet her mother but abandoned her on the way to the working-class neighborhood. After meeting Gloria, who proves to be spoiled and bigoted, Mame visits Gloria's parents in Mountebank at their house, "Upson Downs". Finding them boorish and anti-Semitic, Mame invites them and Gloria to a dinner party at her apartment with Patrick, Babcock, and an assortment of friends.

On the night of the party, Patrick meets Mame's new secretary, Pegeen, and the two are attracted to each other; Agnes also lives there, now pregnant due to her night with O'Bannion and presumed to be unmarried. The entire party is choreographed to show up the Upsons: Lindsay surprises the attendees with galleys from Mame's autobiography, reminding Patrick of forgotten adventures. The book's release prompts a telegram from O'Bannion demanding half the royalties for his efforts, also revealing that he married Agnes on their night out. When Gloria insults Mame's company, Patrick instead defends them and insults Gloria's own circle, ending their relationship. To the Upsons' horror, Mame dedicates her royalties to a home for refugee Jewish children to be built adjoining the Upson property in Mountebank. The Upsons leave in a huff. Mame berates Babcock for his attempts to manipulate Patrick's life; he also leaves. By 1946, Patrick and Pegeen are married and have a son, Michael. Mame and Michael persuade his parents to let Mame take the child on a journey to India, and the movie fades as Mame tells Michael of all the wondrous sights they will see.

== Cast ==
- Rosalind Russell as Mame Dennis
- Forrest Tucker as Beauregard Jackson Pickett Burnside
- Coral Browne as Vera Charles
- Fred Clark as Dwight Babcock
- Roger Smith as Patrick Dennis – older
- Patric Knowles as Lindsay Woolsey
- Peggy Cass as Agnes Gooch
- Jan Handzlik as Patrick Dennis – younger
- Joanna Barnes as Gloria Upson
- Pippa Scott as Pegeen Ryan
- Lee Patrick as Doris Upson
- Willard Waterman as Claude Upson
- Robin Hughes as Brian O'Bannion
- Connie Gilchrist as Norah Muldoon
- Yuki Shimoda as Ito
- Brook Byron as Sally Cato MacDougall
- Carol Veazie as Mrs. Burnside
- Henry Brandon as Acacius Page

== Production ==
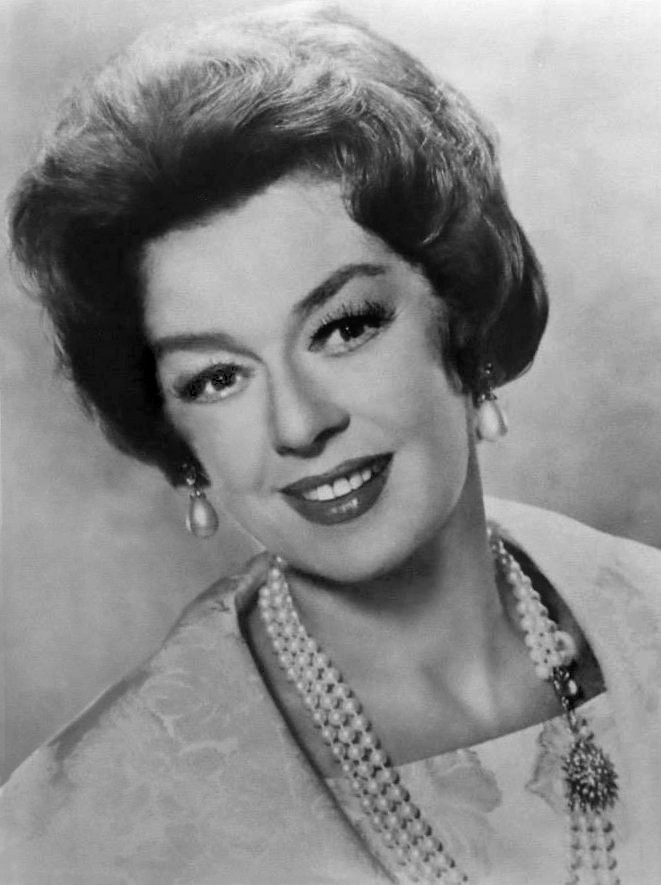
Rosalind Russell plays the flamboyant Mame Dennis, who aims to give Patrick as broad a view of life as possible.

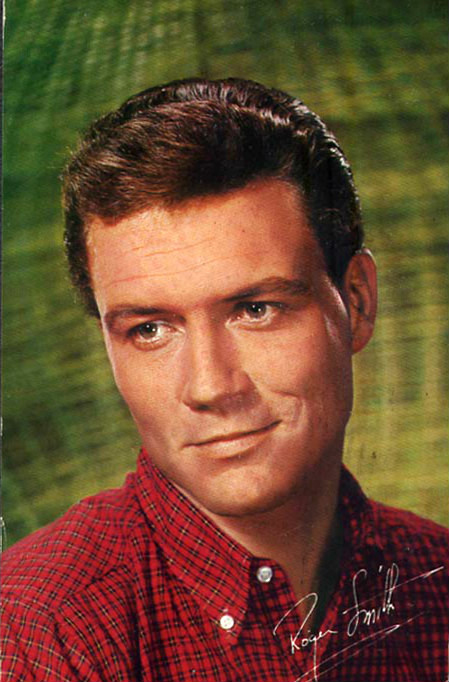
Roger Smith plays adult Patrick Dennis, who as an orphaned child is placed in the care of his Auntie Mame.

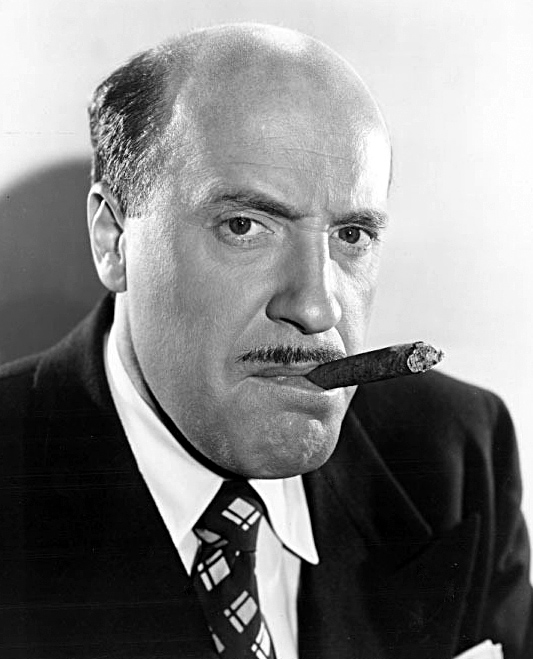
Fred Clark plays Dwight Babcock, Patrick’s fiscal guardian who does his utmost to counter Mame’s liberal tendencies.

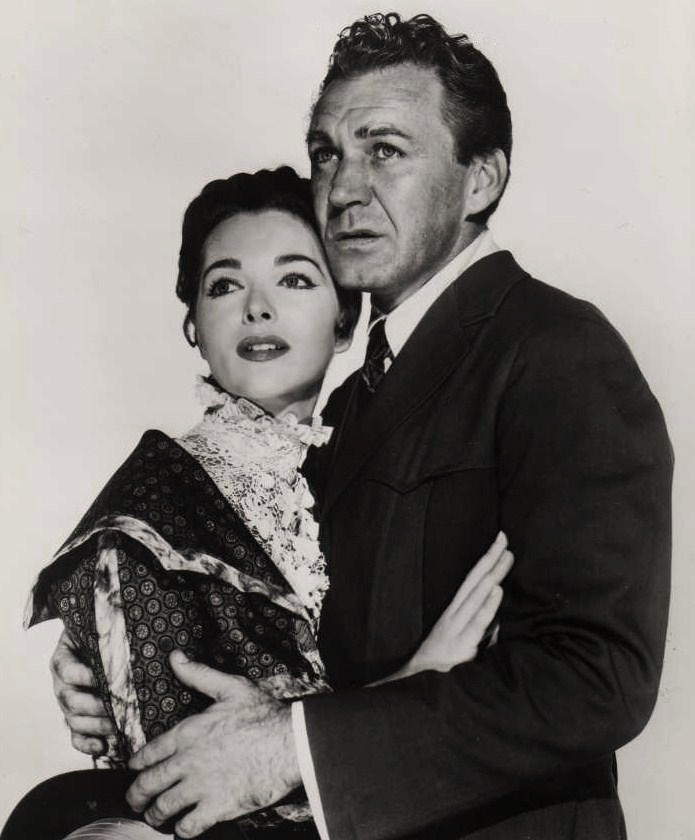
Forrest Tucker (right) plays Beauregard Jackson Pickett Burnside, Southern gentleman who rescues Mame from bankruptcy, leaving her a rich widow.

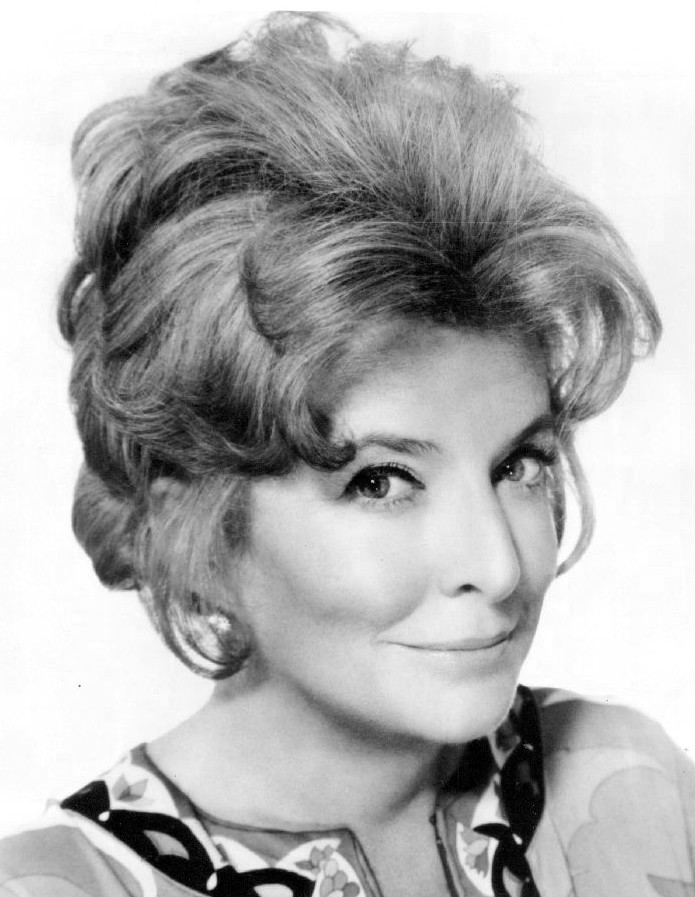
Peggy Cass plays Agnes Gooch, whose one night stand with O’Bannion has unforeseen consequences.

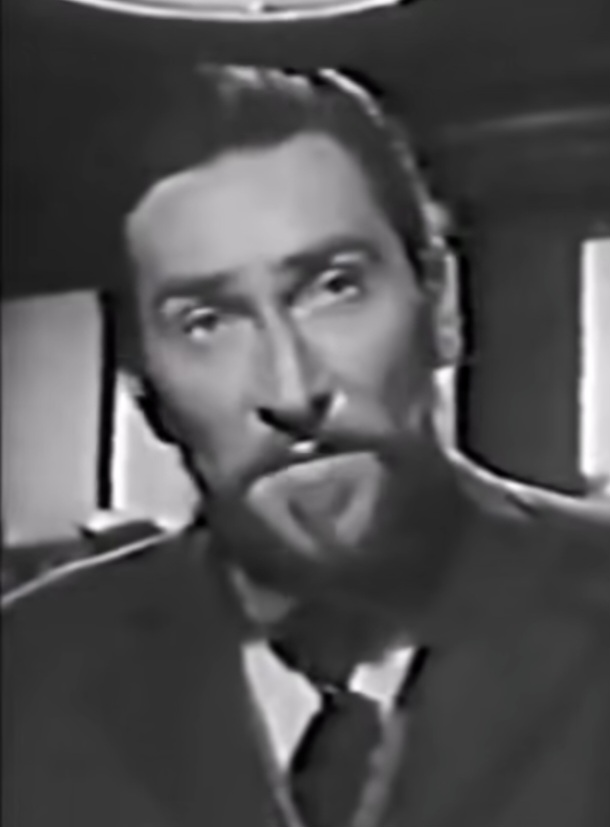
Robin Hughes plays Brian O'Bannion, editor of Mame’s memoirs who intends to live off her wealth.

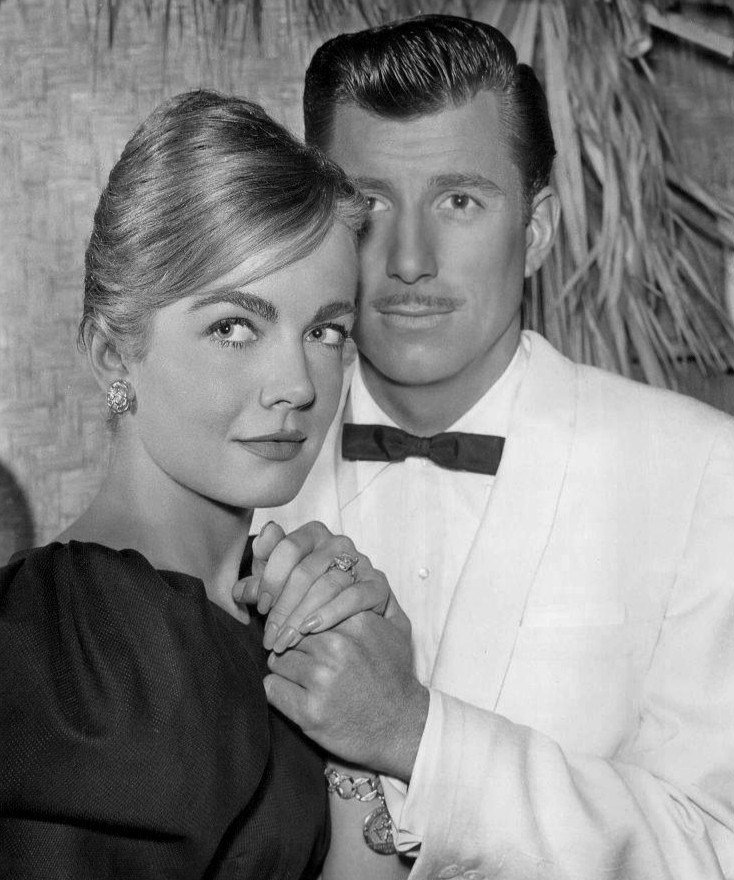
Joanna Barnes (left) plays snobbish Socialite Gloria Upson whose engagement to Patrick exasperates Mame, fearful that all her influences have been wasted.

Morton Da Costa directed the Broadway stage adaptation, which ran from October 1956 through June 1958, for 639 performances. Rosalind Russell originated the role of Mame and was nominated for the 1957 Tony award for Best Performance by a Leading Actress in a Play. She played Mame until January 20, 1958, when Greer Garson took over the part. Russell, Peggy Cass, Yuki Shimoda and Jan Handzlik reprised their Broadway roles in the film.

The Motion Picture Herald review observed that the film "provided a unique means of establishing time and plot progression" through the changing decor of Mame's Beekman Place apartment. The review in the Los Angeles Examiner (June 1958) named six different styles: Chinese, 1920s Modern, "Syrie Maugham” a French style named for writer Somerset Maugham's wife; English, Danish Modern and East Indian. When the Upsons visit Mame, they run afoul of the Danish Modern furniture, which is equipped with lifts. The film received an Academy Award nomination for Best Art Direction (Art Direction: Malcolm Bert; Set Decoration: George James Hopkins).

The costume design for the film, which include outfits for Mame that coordinate with the sets, was provided by Orry-Kelly, who had worked with Rosalind Russell on a number of films. The New York Times critic Bosley Crowther observed: "The lavish décor of Mame's apartment is changed almost as frequently as are her flashy costumes, and all of them are dazzling, in color and on the modified wide-screen."

Rosalind Russell broke her ankle on the first take of a scene where she runs down the stairs. Filming was delayed until she recovered.

== Reception ==
Rosalind Russell drew wide praise for her performance. In an article describing why Turner Classic Movies has named it one of “The Essentials”, Andrea Passafiume observes that the role transformed Russell's career, “first on the Broadway stage and then on the big screen. Having long been a top level movie star throughout the 1930s and 40s, Russell's career in Hollywood was dwindling as she settled into middle age. The role of Mame Dennis... gave her the chance to be glamorous and showcase her sharp comedic talents, which reminded the world that she was still a vital force to be reckoned with. The success of the play made her the toast of Broadway, and the hit film gave her her first Oscar® nomination as Best Actress in more than a decade".

Passafiume adds that the film also transformed Warner Bros. Studios, which was "desperate for a hit, having suffered through a string of recent disappointments which put the once thriving studio increasingly in the red. Auntie Mame was the answer to their prayers and helped restore the studio's former glory." Auntie Mame became the second highest-grossing film of 1958, earning a net profit of $8,800,000.

The movie premiered at the Radio City Music Hall, and Bosley Crowther of The New York Times wrote that "for all its absurd exaggerations and bland inconsistencies, this picture of a tireless party-giver is a highly entertaining thing to see. And, because of the gags that gush from it, it is a constantly amusing thing to hear." Variety called the film "a faithfully funny recording of the hit play, changed only in some small details to conform to motion picture mores ... Rosalind Russell recreates the title role for the film and re-establishes herself as a top picture personality." Harrison's Reports called the film "a fast and furious comedy, with a glamorous background and considerable deep human appeal ... Rosalind Russell, who scored a huge success in the stage play, repeats her wonderful performance as the uninhibited heroine in this screen version. She fits the role so ideally that it is difficult to imagine any one else in the part."

Richard L. Coe of The Washington Post called the film "broad as the Atlantic, too broad for me, but it's still a hilarious, observant comedy ... Miss Russell remains just plain wonderful in the part." John McCarten of The New Yorker dismissed the film, writing that Russell "works hard," but that the film "bogs down badly before it has gone any distance." The Monthly Film Bulletin wrote that the film was "virtually a one-woman revue, a series of turns—Mame as hostess, shopgirl, telephone operator, counterfeit Southern Belle, writer, actress—carried along on a strong current of personality. Rosalind Russell, who created the part on the stage, takes a turn or two to get into her stride; once established, however, her superbly confident timing and powerfully empathic comedy personality see her happily through."

Leonard Maltin gives the film 3.5 out of 4 stars: “Episodic but highly entertaining, sparked by Russell's tour-de-force performance.”

Stanley Kauffmann of The New Republic wrote: 'The film script suffers from the same integral fault as the play. For about the first third, it is diverting high comedy growing out of credible characters; then, for fear of losing momentum, the writers start to pump in gags and gaggy situations. What starts out as glittering comedy descends through farce to circus'.

As of October 2026, Auntie Mame has a score of 83% on the review-aggregation website Rotten Tomatoes, based on 18 reviews.

== Awards and nominations ==
Award	Category	Nominee(s)	Result	Ref.
Academy Awards	Best Motion Picture	Warner Bros.	Nominated	
Academy Awards	Best Actress	Rosalind Russell	Nominated	
Academy Awards	Best Supporting Actress	Peggy Cass	Nominated	
Academy Awards	Best Art Direction	Art Direction: Malcolm Bert; Set Decoration: George James Hopkins	Nominated	
Academy Awards	Best Cinematography – Color	Harry Stradling	Nominated	
Academy Awards	Best Film Editing	William Ziegler	Nominated	
British Academy Film Awards	Best Foreign Actress	Rosalind Russell	Nominated	
Golden Globe Awards	Best Motion Picture – Comedy		Won	
Golden Globe Awards	Best Actress in a Motion Picture – Musical or Comedy	Rosalind Russell	Won	
Golden Globe Awards	Best Supporting Actress – Motion Picture	Peggy Cass	Nominated	
Golden Globe Awards	Most Promising Newcomer – Female	Joanna Barnes	Nominated	
Grammy Awards	Best Sound Track Album, Dramatic Picture Score or Original Cast	Ray Heindorf	Nominated	
Laurel Awards	Top General Entertainment		Won	
Laurel Awards	Top Female Comedy Performance	Rosalind Russell	Won	
Laurel Awards	Top Female Supporting Performance	Peggy Cass	Nominated	
Laurel Awards	Top Cinematography – Color	Harry Stradling	Nominated	
Online Film & Television Association Awards	Film Hall of Fame: Productions		Inducted	

=== Others ===
The film is recognized by American Film Institute in these lists:

- 2000: AFI's 100 Years...100 Laughs – #94
- 2005: AFI's 100 Years...100 Movie Quotes:
  - Mame Dennis: "Life is a banquet, and most poor suckers are starving to death!" – #93

== Home media ==
Auntie Mame was released on Blu-ray on December 5, 2017, with an all new HD remaster of the film and an audio-only track of music from the film. A 4k bluray was released in the US on August 25, 2026

== See also ==
- List of American films of 1958
