= Auntie Mame (play) =

1956 Broadway play based on the novel by Patrick Dennis

- Original language: English
- Written by: Jerome Lawrence; Robert E. Lee
- Genre: Comedy
- Setting: East Village, Manhattan, 1900s

Premiere
- Date: October 31, 1956
- Place: Broadhurst Theatre

Auntie Mame is a comedic stage play written by American playwrights Jerome Lawrence and Robert E. Lee. The play was adapted from the novel of the same name first published in 1955 by Patrick Dennis. The play was a critical and commercial success, and was nominated for five Tony Awards, running for 639 performances.

== Production history ==
The play premiered on Broadway at the Broadhurst Theatre on October 31, 1956, and closed on June 28, 1958, after 639 performances. The original Broadway production was nominated for four Tony Awards, including Best Actress for Rosalind Russell, Best Stage Technician (Joseph Harbuck), and Best Scenic Design (Oliver Smith). Peggy Cass won the Tony Award for Best Featured Actress in a Play for her performance as Agnes Gooch. Russell and Cass reprised their roles for a 1958 film of the same name, for which they were both nominated for Academy Awards.

Following the Broadway production, the show went on a national tour starring Eve Arden in the title role, and opened on London's West End at the Adelphi Theatre, starring Beatrice Lillie. Lillie had also taken over the role of Auntie Mame in the Broadway production. After Rosalind Russell's contract ended, the role was taken over by Greer Garson, and then Lillie. Florence MacMichael replaced Peggy Cass as Agnes Gooch in the Broadway production, and then continued playing the role on tour.

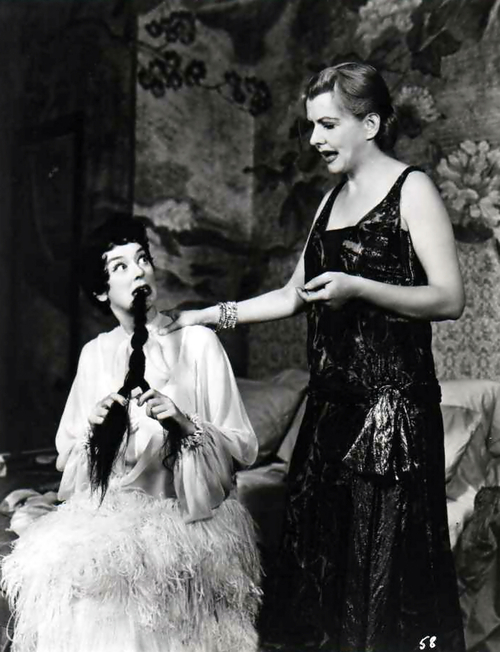
Rosalind Russell and Polly Rowles in the original 1956 Broadway production of Auntie Mame

== Original cast and characters ==
Character	Broadway	1st Tour	2nd Tour	California Tour	West End
Character	1956	1957	1958	1958	1958
Mame Dennis	Rosalind Russell	Constance Bennett	Sylvia Sidney	Eve Arden	Beatrice Lillie
Beauregard Burnside	Robert Smith	Mark O'Daniels	Mark O'Daniels	Brooks West	Geoffrey Toone
Vera Charles	Polly Rowles	Jane van Duser	Shannon Dean	Benay Venuta	Florence Desmond
Dwight Babcock	Robert Allen	Blaine Cordner	Leo Lucker	Robert Allen	David Bird
Patrick Dennis	Robert Higgins	Michael Thomas	William Berrian	Ray Fulmer	Dinsdale Landen
M. Lindsay Woolsey	John O'Hare	Kendall Clark	Phil Arthur	David Lewis	Gerald Welch
Agnes Gooch	Peggy Cass	Bernice McLaughlin	Sudie Bond	Florence MacMichael	Rosamund Greenwood
Young Patrick	Jan Handzlik	Robert Lindner	Guy Russell	Dennis Joel	John Hall
Gloria Upson	Joyce Lear	Dorothy Sefton	Francesca Trantum	Suzanne Turner	Jacqueline Ellis
Pegeen Ryan	Patricia Jenkins	Martha Randall	Laura Lee	Jacqueline Holt	Jill Melford
Doris Upson	Dorothy Blackburn	Dulcie Cooper	Ruth Holden	Dorothy Blackburn	Pamela Simpson
Claude Upson	Walter Klavun	Arthur Barnett	T. J. Halligan	Willard Waterman	Donald Stewart
Brian O'Bannion	James Monks	Gerald Metcalfe	Philip Bosco	Manning Ross	Patrick Holt
Norah Muldoon	Beulah Garrick	Ann Sullivan	Betty Sinclair	Isabel Price	Anita Sharp Bolster
Ito	Yuki Shimoda	Yoji Matsuoka	Yoshi Naka	Yuki Shimoda	John A. Tinn
Sally Cato MacDougall	Marian Winters	Fayne Blackburn	Winifred Ainslee	Elizabeth Talbot-Martin	Helen Horton
Mother Burnside	Ethel Cody	Dorrit Kelton	Joan Davenport	Spivy	Natalie Lynn
Ralph Devine	Grant Sullivan	Otis Bigelow	John Granger	Loren Tindall	Tom Gill
