= Mamiye Brothers =

American children's clothing company

- Type: Private corporation
- Industry: Apparel
- Founded: 1947
- Founder: Mamiye family
- Headquarters: New York, New York
- Products: manufacturer of branded children's and teen's apparel
- Website: http://www.mamiye.com

Mamiye Brothers is family owned and operated company founded in 1947 in New York, New York that is a manufacturer of branded children's and teen's apparel. Some of the clothing brands licensed or directly owned by Mamiye include: Flapdoodles, Little Me, Guess Kids, Wallflower and Kensie. Mamiye Brother products are distributed to mass market retailers such as department stores and specialty stores throughout the United States.

== History ==
=== Recent ===
Mamiye acquired Flapdoodles Apparel launching and juniors jeanswear in 2005 and the company bought the rights to produce Bongo's branded apparel in 2006.

In 2007 the company purchased the "Little Me" kids clothing brand from S. Schwab Company. The S. Schwab Company closed its "Little Me" operation after the sale, letting go of most "Little Me" employees.
