= The Octette Bridge Club =

- Original language: English
- Written by: P.J. Barry
- Setting: Providence, Rhode Island; October 1934 and 1944

Premiere
- Date: 1984
- Place: Actors Theatre of Louisville

The Octette Bridge Club is a play by P.J. Barry. Set in Providence, Rhode Island, it focuses on eight sisters of Irish descent who meet on alternate Friday evenings to play bridge and gossip. The first act, which opens with the women posing for a photograph for the Sunday rotogravure section of the local newspaper, takes place in October 1934, and the second act is set just prior to Halloween ten years later.

Ann Conroy, married to a man who drinks too much, is a no-nonsense schoolteacher who hosts the bridge nights. Martha McDermitt, the widowed eldest sister, is known for her sense of responsibility and stern personality. Mary Margaret Donovan is a spinster who lives with younger sister Alice Monahan and her husband Walter, who have no children. In the second act, Mary Margaret uses a wheelchair and has a slight speech impediment due to a stroke. Nora Hiller is an easy-going woman devoted to her husband Lawrence and their children. Connie Emerson is always quick with a wisecrack. Lil Carmody is a free spirit who plays piano, and Betsy Bailey is the youngest, a melancholy married woman with two children who is struggling to find her own identity.

The play premiered at the Humana Festival of New American Plays, an annual event presented by the Actors Theatre of Louisville, in 1984. The Broadway production, directed by Tom Moore, opened at the Music Box Theatre on March 5, 1985 following eight previews and closed after 24 performances. The cast included Elizabeth Huddle as Ann, Anne Pitoniak as Martha, Bette Henritze as Mary Margaret, Lois De Banzie as Alice, Elizabeth Franz as Nora, Nancy Marchand as Connie, Peggy Cass as Lil, and Gisela Caldwell as Betsy.

In his review for The New York Times, Frank Rich observed, "This synthetic play . . . has not so much been written as mechanically mapped out according to an open-and-shut formula. The exposition of each character's one or two stereotypical traits is accomplished by the photographer's rapid-fire journalistic questions in the opening scene; then the author slowly rolls out the skeleton in each sister's closet. Complexities of emotion and dramatic structure are neatly avoided by keeping all the menfolk offstage . . . Although the evening runs less than two hours, most of it is padding designed to space out the delayed plot revelations. There is plenty of gratuitous nostalgia . . . as well as an extremely tedious intrafamily talent contest performed after intermission."

Pitoniak and Marchand were nominated for the Drama Desk Award for Outstanding Featured Actress in a Play but lost to Judith Ivey in Hurlyburly. John Lee Beatty was nominated for the Drama Desk Award for Outstanding Set Design but lost to Heidi Ettinger for Big River. Carrie Robbins was nominated for the Drama Desk Award for Outstanding Costume Design but lost to Alexander Reid for Much Ado About Nothing.
