= Cris Alexander =

American actor (1920–2012)

- Born: Alan Smith; January 14, 1920; Tulsa, Oklahoma, U.S.
- Died: March 7, 2012 (aged 92); Saratoga Springs, New York, U.S.
- Occupations: Actor; singer; dancer; designer; photographer
- Years active: 1938–1969

Cris Alexander (born Alan Smith, January 14, 1920 – March 7, 2012) was an American actor, singer, dancer, designer, and photographer.

== Early life and education ==
Cris Alexander was born in Tulsa, Oklahoma, in 1920. He began using the name Christopher, which he thought more distinguished, in his teens. On the advice of a spiritualist, he removed the "h" and went by Cris from then on.

Alexander attended the University of Oklahoma while working as a radio announcer in Oklahoma City. He moved to New York City in 1938 to study at the Feagin School of Dramatic Art.

== Acting ==
Alexander was cast as Chip, a naive sailor, in the original Broadway cast of Leonard Bernstein's On the Town in 1944. He performed the song "Come Up to My Place" in a duet with Nancy Walker in the role of Hildy. He returned to Broadway in 1946 in Present Laughter opposite Clifton Webb.

In 1953, Alexander was cast in Wonderful Town, another Bernstein musical, with Rosalind Russell. He played drugstore manager Frank Lippencott, performing the comic song "Conversation Piece." Alexander stayed with the musical for its entire run. He moved next into performances for Auntie Mame, again with Russell. Among the multiple roles he played in the original Broadway production, Cris Alexander repeated his part of store manager Mr. Loomis for the 1958 film version also titled Auntie Mame.

Alexander's last acting role was in Lanford Wilson's 1966 play The Madness of Lady Bright. He continued to be involved in theatrical productions and created projection slides for the 1970 production of Richard Rodgers's Two by Two.

== Photography ==
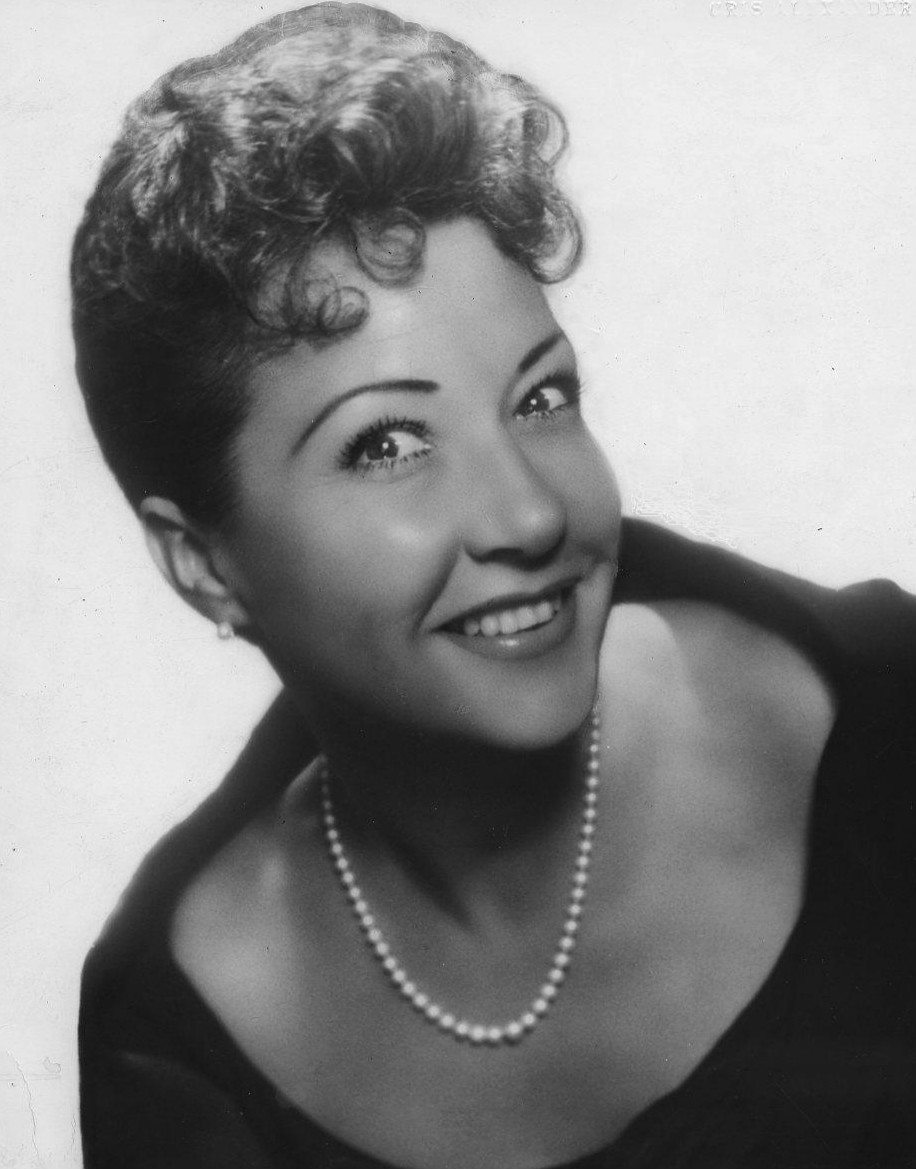
Photograph of Ethel Merman taken by Cris Alexander in 1956

Alexander also had a career as a photographer, and opened a photo studio in the late 1930s when he first moved to New York City. He was noted for his portraits of celebrities and performers, many of whom were his personal friends. He worked as chief photographer at Andy Warhol's Interview magazine, and as the official photographer for the New York City Ballet.

He contributed hundreds of original and altered photographs to two of Patrick Dennis's best selling books. Little Me, a mock biography documenting the life of fictional actress Belle Poitrine, features more than 150 of Alexander's photographs. It featured photos of his partner Shaun O'Brien, and would become a camp classic. Alexander also wrote the novel's preface. Dennis's First Lady: My Thirty Days at the White House told the story of Martha Dinwiddie Butterfield, wife of a fictional robber baron president.

== Personal life ==
Alexander became involved with New York City Ballet dancer Shaun O'Brien in the 1940s, beginning a relationship that would last nearly 60 years. The couple retired to upstate New York in 1993, and married in 2011 when same-sex marriage became legal in New York State. Cris Alexander died in Saratoga Springs in 2012.

== Film roles ==
- The Littlest Angel (1969) – Raphael
- Auntie Mame (1958) – Mr. Loomis
- Wonderful Town (1958) TV – Frank Lippencott
