= Patrick Dennis =

American author (1921–1976)

- Born: Edward Everett Tanner III; May 18, 1921; Chicago, Illinois, U.S.
- Died: November 6, 1976 (aged 55); New York City, U.S.
- Other name: Virginia Rowans
- Education: Evanston Township High School
- Occupations: Author, Butler
- Spouse: Louise Stickney (m. 1948–1976)
- Children: 2

Edward Everett Tanner III (18 May 1921 – 6 November 1976), known by the pseudonym Patrick Dennis, was an American author. His novel Auntie Mame: An irreverent escapade (1955) was one of the bestselling American books of the 20th century. In chronological vignettes, the narrator — also named Patrick — recalls his adventures growing up under the wing of his madcap aunt, Mame Dennis. Tanner wrote a sequel, titled Around the World with Auntie Mame, in 1958. He based the character of Mame Dennis on his father's sister, Marion Tanner. Tanner also wrote several novels under the pseudonym Virginia Rowans.

"I write in the first person, but it is all fictional. The public assumes that what seems fictional is fact; so the way for me to be inventive is to seem factual but be fictional." All of Tanner's novels employ to some degree the traditional comic devices of masks, subterfuge and deception.

== Early life ==
Edward Everett Tanner III was born in Chicago, Illinois to Edward Everett Tanner II and Florence (née Thacker) Tanner, and grew up in Evanston, Illinois. He had one sister, Barbara, later Mrs. Hastings. His father nicknamed him Pat before he was born after the Irish heavyweight boxer Pat Sweeney, "a dirty fighter known for kicking his opponents." When he was old enough to say so, he let it be known that he liked Pat better than Edward, and so Pat he became. He attended Evanston Township High School, where he was popular and excelled in writing and theater.

== Career ==
In 1942, he joined the American Field Service, working as an ambulance driver in North Africa and the Middle East.

He worked as an administrative assistant for Eileen J. Garrett and he told her Auntie Mame was based in part on her, according to her granddaughter.

The first edition of Auntie Mame spent 112 weeks on the bestseller list, selling more than 2 million copies in five languages. The manuscript was turned down by 15 publishers before being accepted by the Vanguard Press. At the height of its popularity, it was selling more than 1,000 copies per day; throughout 1955 and 1956, it sold between 1,000 and 5,000 per week. In 1956, with Auntie Mame, The Loving Couple: His (and Her) Story, and Guestward Ho!, Tanner became the first writer to have three books on the New York Times bestseller list at the same time.

Working with longtime friend, actor and photographer Cris Alexander, Tanner created two parody memoirs, complete with elaborate photographs. The first, titled Little Me, recounts the escapades through life and love of glamour girl Belle Poitrine "as told to Patrick Dennis." His wife, Louise, appeared as Pixie Portnoy in the book's photographic illustrations, which included their children, their friends, and their housekeeper as well. The second "bio," titled First Lady (1964), is the life story of Martha Dinwiddie Butterfield, oblivious wife of a robber baron who "steals" the U.S. presidency for 30 days at the turn of the century.

== Personal life ==
On December 30, 1948, Tanner married Louise Stickney, with whom he had two children. He led a double life as a conventional husband and father, and as a bisexual in later life, becoming a well-known participant in Greenwich Village's gay scene.

== Later years and death ==
Tanner's work fell out of fashion in the 1970s, and all of his books went out of print. In his later years, he left writing to become a butler, a job that his friends reported he enjoyed. At one time, he worked for Ray Kroc, the CEO of McDonald's. His employers had no inkling that their butler, "Edwards," was the famous author Patrick Dennis.

He died from pancreatic cancer in Manhattan at the age of 55, on November 6, 1976. At the turn of the 21st century, there was a resurgence of interest in his work, and subsequently many of his novels are once again available. His son, Dr. Michael Tanner, wrote introductions to several reissues of his father's books. Some of Tanner's original manuscripts are held at Yale University, others at Boston University.

== Bibliography ==
=== as Virginia Rowans ===
- Rowans, Virginia (1953). Oh What a Wonderful Wedding!, New York: Crowell
- Rowans, Virginia (1954). House Party, New York: Crowell
- Rowans, Virginia (1956). The Loving Couple: His (and Her) Story, New York: Crowell
- Rowans, Virginia (1961). Love and Mrs. Sargent, New York: Farrar, Straus and Cudahy

=== as Patrick Dennis ===
- Dennis, Patrick (1955). Auntie Mame, New York: Vanguard Press
- Dennis, Patrick (1956). Guestward, Ho! by Barbara C. Hooton, as indiscreetly confided to Patrick Dennis, New York: Vanguard Press
- Erskine, Dorothy, and Patrick Dennis (1957). The Pink Hotel, New York: Putnam
- Dennis, Patrick (1958). Around the World with Auntie Mame, New York: New American Library
- Dennis, Patrick (1961). Little Me: The Intimate Memoirs of that Great Star of Stage, Screen and Television, Belle Poitrine (as told to Patrick Dennis), New York: E. P. Dutton. ISBN 0-7679-1347-7
- Dennis, Patrick (1962). Genius, New York: Harcourt, Brace & World
- Dennis, Patrick (1964). First Lady: My Thirty Days Upstairs at the White House, by Martha Dinwiddie Butterfield, as told to Patrick Dennis, New York: William Morrow
- Dennis, Patrick (1965). The Joyous Season, New York: Harcourt, Brace & World
- Dennis, Patrick (1966). Tony, New York: E. P. Dutton
- Dennis, Patrick (1968). How Firm a Foundation, New York: William Morrow. ISBN 0-586-03549-4
- Dennis, Patrick (1971). Paradise, New York: Harcourt Brace Jovanovich
- Dennis, Patrick (1972). 3-D, New York: Coward, McCann and Geoghegan (published in the UK as Anything You Like in 1974)

== Adaptations in other media ==
The 1956 Broadway production of Auntie Mame, starring Rosalind Russell, and the highly successful 1958 screen adaptation that followed, inspired Jerry Herman's 1966 musical Mame, with Angela Lansbury in the lead. A 1974 film version starred Lucille Ball and Bea Arthur.

Little Me was turned into a musical in 1962, with book by Neil Simon and score by Cy Coleman and Carolyn Leigh, and Sid Caesar playing all the male roles. Bob Fosse won the Tony Award for Best Choreography. There have been several revivals of Little Me, most recently in 1998 with Martin Short, who won a Tony Award for Best Actor.

Two of Tanner's novels were transformed into television sitcoms:

- House Party (1954), about a supposedly wealthy family who were actually dead broke, was the inspiration for The Pruitts of Southampton (1966–67), starring Phyllis Diller, Grady Sutton, Gypsy Rose Lee, and Richard Deacon.
- Dennis's book Guestward Ho! (1956) became the sitcom Guestward Ho! (1960–61), about city folk trying to run a dude ranch in New Mexico. The show starred Mark Miller, J. Carrol Naish, and Joanne Dru.
