= Madame Aphrodite (musical) =

- Music: Jerry Herman
- Lyrics: Jerry Herman
- Book: Tad Mosel
- Basis: Madame Aphrodite by Tad Mosel
- Productions: 1961 Off-Broadway

Madame Aphrodite is a musical with a book by Tad Mosel and music and lyrics by Jerry Herman. It is based on Mosel's play of the same name that was broadcast on television in 1953.

The original off-Broadway production was short-lived and only ran for 13 performances in 1961. It is notable as the only stage musical in the entire Jerry Herman canon (which includes smash hits such as Hello Dolly!, Mame and La Cage aux Folles as well as less successful but highly respected flops like Dear World, Mack & Mabel and The Grand Tour) that never spawned an original cast album, and has never been performed since its original production.

== Plot ==
Madame Aphrodite is essentially a modern fable built around the aphorism that beauty is more than skin deep. The titular Madame Aphrodite (Nancy Andrews), described as "a bitter recluse", lived alone in a dingy apartment. Working from her kitchen, she manufactured a phony beauty cream using unpleasant and ineffective ingredients, which she planned to sell to her neighbours as revenge for what she perceived as meanness towards her. To help distribute the phony product, Madame Aphrodite hired an attractive but naive young man named Barney (Jack Drummond) as her salesman. Believing the cream to have genuine magical powers, Barney sells it to a shy young girl, Rosemary (Cherry Davis), who becomes attracted to him. The rather plain Rosemary believes that she is being trandsformed into a beauty, and attributes this to the phony product. Madame Aphrodite, touched by the girl's innocence, confesses that the beauty cream is a hoax, and points out that the change in Rosemary's demeanor was, in fact, due to her love for the likeable Barney. Madame Aphrodite further reveals that she sold the cream to take revenge on womankind because, as a child, she herself had been duped by an advertisement for a fake beauty product. The show concludes with her moment of self-realisation, where "another life has been saved on Second Avenue".

== Background ==
The musical Madame Aphrodite traces it origins back to a one-hour TV play of the same name, which was written in the early 1950s by playwright Tad Mosel, one of the leading exponents of that genre at that time. The play told the simple and fable-like story of a middle-aged beautician who manufactured and sold fake beauty cream to gullible woman. The televised version, first screened on December 9, 1953 as part of the Goodyear Television Playhouse series, starred Ruth White in the title role, with Philip Abbot as her salesman.

Although Mosel was responsible for many similar TV plays during the 1950s, he would not write anything specifically for the theatre until 1960, when he adapted James Agee's novel, A Death in the Family into a play. Entitled All the Way Home, it opened on Broadway on November 30, 1960, to considerable acclaim; by the time it closed ten months and 333 performances later, it had received a Tony nomination, a Drama Critics' Circle Award, and the 1961 Pulitzer Prize for Drama.

In December 1960, only a few weeks after the opening of All the Way Home, it was reported that Mosel had now turned his attention to adapting his earlier TV play, Madame Aphrodite, into a musical for the off-Broadway stage. It was pointed out that it not only represented Mosel's first stage musical, but also "the first musical to come to off-Broadway from television". The new Madame Aphrodite was to be sponsored by a team of three young producers (Howard Barker, Cynthia Baer and Robert Chambers) who were already well known for producing another off-Broadway show, Little Mary Sunshine, which opened in November 1959 and ran for almost three years. Music and lyrics were to be provided by newcomer Jerry Herman who, at that time, was known in New York only for two minor but well-received off-Broadway revues Nightcap (1958) and Parade (1960). In his memoirs, Herman recalls being brought into the project through his agent, Priscilla Morgan, who often held musical evenings for her clients. At one such event, Herman met Tad Mosel and, after being shown the script for Madame Aphrodite, admitted "I was fascinated because it was so different from the kind of thing that I had been doing".

=== Development ===
When news of the musical version of Madame Aphrodite was announced towards the end of 1960, it was asserted that "from the way the talk went the other day, it should be along before Winter's end". By the following February, however, the project was being slated for production in the Spring. Then, in May 1961, it was reported that the show would not open until the Fall. At that time, the producers announced that they had recently secured the services of director Robert Ennis Turoff, whose only previous off-Broadway musical credit was directing a short-lived revival of The Golden Apple, staged by the Equity Library Theatre earlier that same year.

The repeated delays in the development of Madame Aphrodite allowed composer-lyricist Jerry Herman to become involved in the creation of another musical, Milk & Honey, which underwent its out-of-town tryout between August and September 1961 before opening on Broadway on October 10. It was only then that an opening date for Madame Aphrodite was finally announced to the public: the new show would open on Wednesday, December 27, at the Orpheum Theatre on Second Avenue. Although some observers expressed surprise that Herman seemed to be returning to off-Broadway after a minor Broadway hit, the composer-lyricist stated that he was simply returning to his roots, pointing out also that "Madame Aphrodite was on my agenda before Milk & Honey – it's [sic] production just didn't develop as rapidly”.

By the time that an opening date had been set for Madame Aphrodite, TV and stage comedian Nancy Andrews had already been cast in the title role. During November, it was revealed that actress Cherry Davis (last seen in the Broadway production of Gypsy) had been signed to play Rosemary, the ingenue lead. The key role of Barney, Madame Aphrodite's salesman, was to be played by Jack Drummond, whose previous experience included minor roles in such Broadway shows as Beg, Borrow or Steal (1960), The Pajama Game (1956) and Me and Juliet (1954). The show's cast also included future film and television star Lou Cutell (best known for the cult 1965 film Frankenstein Meets the Space Monster, and more recent TV sitcom appearances) in the small role of Mr. Schultz.

== Production history ==
=== Original production ===
In mid-December, it was announced that the premiere of Madame Aphrodite had been postponed yet again, albeit this time by only two days. True to form, the show opened on Friday, December 29, 1961, at 7:30pm. The reviews were mixed to negative, with Mosel's book repeatedly identified as the biggest problem. Jack Gaver stated that "the libretto is not a good one. The story seemed to border almost on fantasy, yet never quite takes a step over that line. Might have been better if it had". Writing in the New York Times, Lewis Funke commented that "the story is lumbering and humourless, with much of what is passed off as comedy being malapropisms uttered by the fake beautician". He was referring to Madame Aphrodite's habit of substituting words of similar sound but different meaning: examples cited by Funke included "migratin' headache" (for "migraine headache") and "incinerating" for "insinuating". The comic device was also reflected in at least one song, "Sales Reproach" (i.e. "Sales Approach"). Most of the show's critics, however, found this irritating rather than endearing.

Meanwhile, Robert Ennis Turoff's direction was described as "adequate", and there was some praise for the sets, costumes and lighting, and also for the performances of Jack Drummond and the "tremendously attractive" Cherry Davis as the salesman and his love interest. Funke observed that, although Nancy Andrews was more than adequate in the title role, the character of Madame Aphrodite herself was not particularly pleasant or sympathetic, while Jack Gaver noted that the actress "suffers in the title role due to the general malaise of the script". The aspect of the show that received the most praise, however, was Herman's score, with Gaver stating that "there is a pleasure to be had in practically every one of the thirteen songs". Funcke reported that "although his songs don't quite mix with the chronicle itself, they are individually attractive and melodious". He singled out three songs ("Beautiful", "Only Love" and "The girls who sit and wait") as the score's highlights, and further observed that "Beat the world" had "a bitter current to it" while "A drop of lavender oil" had "the right sinister undertone". With admirable foresight, Funke concluded that "the score as a whole has a nice quality, and is further evidence that Mr. Herman will be heard from again".

== Musical numbers ==
Act I

- I Don't Mind
- Sale Reproach
- Beat the World
- Miss Euclid Avenue
- Beautiful
- You I like
- And a Drop of Lavender Oil
- Gotta be a Dream
- The Girls who Sit and Wait
- Beat the World (Reprise)

Act II

- You I Like (reprise)
- Afferdytie
- There Comes a Time
- Miss Euclid Avenue (reprise)
- Only Love
- Take a Good Look Around

Two songs titled "Theme" and "Turkish Corner" were cut from the production before its opening night.

== Legacy ==
=== Production and creative team ===
The failure of Madame Aphrodite which closed after only 13 performances, appears to have soured some of its production team on further theatrical ventures. Tad Mosel, for example, never wrote for the New York theatre scene again. Similarly, the show's three young producers never worked together again, although one of them, Cynthia Baer did go on to produce an off-Broadway play on her own: a production of August Strindberg's Crime and Crime, which folded after one night in 1963. Madame Aphrodite herself, actress Nancy Andrews, went on to create the lead role in the Broadway musical Little Me (1962) but thereafter appeared only as a standby (e.g. in the 1971 Broadway production 70, Girls, 70) or in regional tours of shows such as Funny Girl and A Little Night Music. However, after Andrews' death in 1989, several of her obituaries noted that, back in 1961, she had created the role of Madame Aphrodite in Jerry Herman's first book musical.

In his memoirs, Jerry Herman described Madame Aphrodite as "a strange little show [that] was well ahead of its time", while conceding that the production "really wasn't very well done and maybe wasn't the interesting piece that I thought it was at the time". Nevertheless, he remains proud of his score and maintains that, despite the show's failure, he became involved for the right reasons - "because I had a very strong affinity for the material, and because I felt it would make me grow as an artist".

Madame Aphrodite occupies a unique place amongst Herman's stage musicals in that it has never been revived since its original production. Unlike some of his later flops, it has neither been the subject of a one-off concert performance (cf. Mack & Mabel) nor has there been any reported attempt to revise and re-stage the show to eliminate the problems associated with its original production (cf. Dear World and The Grand Tour). In the mid-1980s, it was even reported that Herman was officially not interested in making Madame Aphrodite available for new professional or amateur productions. Furthermore, songs from the show have never been interpolated into any of the numerous musical revues celebrating Herman's substantial back-catalogue, including An Evening with Jerry Herman (1974, 1998), Jerry's Girls (1984), Showtune (2003 - a.k.a. Tune the Grand Up and The Best of Times). Herman did, however, renew the copyright to the songs from Madame Aphrodite as recently as 1989.

=== Recordings ===
Madame Aphrodite is also unique as the only Jerry Herman book musical for which a commercial cast album was never released. Herman's own demonstration recording is known to exist, which comprises his versions of the songs "Only Love", "Beautiful", "Take a Good Look Around" and "The Girls Who Sit and Wait". Another recording, often described as the 'studio demo', includes the same four songs plus "Miss Euclid Avenue". These songs are believed to have been performed by John Rickard, an Australian theatre actor who appeared in several West End musicals in the early 1960s.

The only song from the Madame Aphrodite score to have escaped to become a standard of sorts is "The Girls who Sit and Wait". A cover version, performed by Fay DeWitt, was included in the 1977 compilation album Contemporary Broadway Revisited, released on Ben Bagley's Painted Smiles Records. More recently, another version was recorded by Leanne Masterton for her 2003 CD, Before the Parade Passes By: The Jerry Herman Songbook. That same year, the song was the only selection from Madame Aphrodite to be included in a lavish published anthology of Herman's work, entitled Jerry Herman: The Lyrics – A Celebration.

=== Trunk songs ===
Jerry Herman's reluctance to make Madame Aphrodite available for public performance, coupled with his desire to renew the copyright on the score, is explained by the fact that several songs from the show became trunk songs – that is, their music was recycled, with new lyrics, to create new songs in some of Herman's subsequent stage musicals.

The first song to re-appear in this way was "Only Love", which, with new lyrics, became "It's Today" in Herman's 1966 hit, Mame. The song was in fact already a trunk song, having been a rewritten version of the song "Show Tune" from Herman's 1960 musical review Parade. Another song, "Gotta be a Dream" was re-written as "Love is only Love" for the same production; it was cut from the score of Mame, but later interpolated in the film version of Hello, Dolly (1969). Around the same time, some of the music from "The Girls who Sit and Wait" was incorporated in the song "And I was Beautiful", from Dear World. Finally, the tune from Madame Aphrodite's "Beautiful" re-emerged some years later as "A Little More Mascara" in Herman's 1983 comeback show, La Cage aux Folles. It might also be noted that Herman evidently liked the title of the song "You I Like" so much that he used it again for an entirely new song (i.e. with new lyrics and music) in his 1979 Broadway show, The Grand Tour.
