= Annelies (given name) =

Feminine given name

- Gender: Female
- Language: Dutch

Origin
- Meaning: "Grace" "favor"

Other names
- See also: Anneliese, Annaliese, Analiese, Annalisa

Annelies is a female given name, a spelling variation of Anneliese, a name of either German, Dutch or Nordic origin. It is a compound form of "Anne" and "Lies", a short form of "Elisabeth".

Notable people with the name include:

- Annelies Bredael (born 1965), Belgian rower
- Annelies Burmeister (1928–1988), German operatic contralto singer
- Annelies Cook (born 1984), American biathlete
- Annelies Dom (born 1986), Belgian cyclist
- Annelies Marie Frank, full name of German-Dutch diarist Anne Frank (1929–1945)
- Annelies Knoppers, American volleyball player and coach
- Annelies Kupper (1906–1987), German operatic soprano
- Annelies Maas (born 1960), Dutch swimmer
- Annelies Meier, Swiss orienteering competitor
- Annelies Nelck (1925–2014), French painter, engraver
- Annelies Nuy (born 1960), Dutch fashion designer
- Annelies Reinhold (1917–2007), Austrian actress
- Annelies Schilhan (born 1936), Austrian figure skater
- Annelies Strba (born 1947), Swiss multimedia artist
- Annelies Thies (born 1969), Dutch sailor
- Annelies Van Doorslaer (born 1989), Belgian cyclist
- Annelies Van Parys (born 1975), Belgian composer
- Annelies Verbeke (born 1976), Belgian author
- Annelies Verlinden (born 1978), Belgian politician
- Annelies Verstand (born 1949), Dutch politician
- Annelies Wilder-Smith (born 1961), Professor of infectious diseases
- Annelies Zoomers, Dutch professor in International Development Studies

== See also ==
- Annelies (disambiguation)
- Annelies (disambiguation)
