= Cultural depictions of Anne Frank =

The following lists some references to the Holocaust-era Jewish diarist Anne Frank in popular culture.

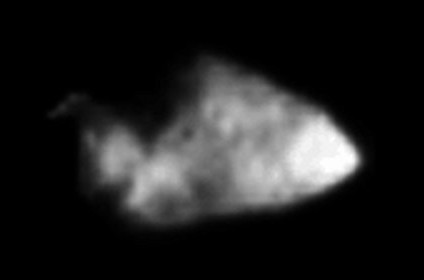
Image of 5535 Annefrank taken by the Stardust space probe

== Literature ==
- Time magazine considered Anne Frank one of the most influential people of the 20th century.
- A picture of Anne Frank appears in LIFE's 100 Photos that Changed the World.
- Philip Roth — U.S. novelist whose novel The Ghost Writer (1979) imagines Anne Frank surviving World War II and living anonymously as a writer in the United States.
- Geoff Ryman's 1998 novel 253 features an elderly Anne Frank as a passenger on the London Underground.
- In Douglas Coupland's 1991 book Generation X: Tales for an Accelerated Culture, two of the characters have a discussion about World War II. Anne Frank is brought up as an example (the only one given) of someone who became famous because of the war but did not personally profit from that fame.
- The book The Freedom Writers Diary (and its 2007 film adaptation) chronicles the lives of high school students whose English teacher encourages them to read The Diary of Anne Frank. Through their experience with the book, the students then raised funds to bring Miep Gies, the woman whose house Anne Frank hid in, to their high school to speak with them of her experience with Anne. The events portrayed in the book and the film are actual events due to the impression caused by reading the diary.
- Anne Frank Conquers the Moon Nazis, a tongue-in-cheek webcomic by Bill Mudron, about a resurrected Anne Frank rebuilt cybernetically to defend the Earth from an extraterrestrial Nazi assault, ran online until 2003.
- Annelies is a 2019 novel that imagines how Anne Frank would have reacted had she survived the Holocaust
- Harry Turtledove's 2014 alternate history short story for Tor.com, "The Eighth-Grade History Class Visits the Hebrew Home for the Aging", is narrated by an elderly Anne Berkowitz, née Frank, who survived the war, married an American, moved to Los Angeles, and is talking about her Holocaust experience with local middle schoolers visiting her nursing home.

== Music ==
- Dnevnik Anny Frank is a Russian language opera, composed in 1968.
- On their 1980 album Fig. 14, Boston college rock band Human Sexual Response included a song called "Anne Frank Story", which relates the unusual emotional experience of viewing the Anne Frank House as a tourist.
- Neutral Milk Hotel — US indie rock band whose 1998 album In the Aeroplane Over the Sea was inspired by the lead singer Jeff Mangum's affection for Anne Frank. It includes the songs, Holland 1945 ('The only girl I ever loved/ Was born with roses in her eyes/ But then they buried her alive/ One evening 1945/ With just her sister at her side/ And only weeks before the guns all came and rained on everyone'), In the Aeroplane Over the Sea ('Anne's ghost all around...'), Oh Comely ('I know they buried her body with others/ Her sister and mother and five hundred families/ And would she remember me fifty years later/ I wish I could save her/ In some sort of time machine'), "Ghost" ("She was born in a bottle rocket, 1929"), and many other songs on In the Aeroplane Over the Sea.
- In 2004 Robert Steadman composed a twenty-minute musical work for choir and string orchestra entitled Tehillim for Anne which commemorated Anne Frank's life with settings of three Psalms in Hebrew.
- The British composer James Whitbourn wrote a concert-length choral work entitled Annelies (Anne Frank's real name) which sets larger portions of the diary text itself and which was premiered in London in 2005 by American Jewish conductor Leonard Slatkin.
- A Punk rock band from Colorado named themselves "Anne Frank on Crank", which by their explanation vaguely suggests the "down-trodden rising up with an attitude."
- The Indonesian progressive rock band have Discus in their second album ...tot Licht a 19-minute track titled "Anne" adapted from the diary.
- There are some public domain folk songs about Anne Frank, including the "Dear Diary" and "A Father And His Daughter" folk songs.
- The Beauty That Still Remains is a choral work by Norwegian composer Marcus Paus based on Frank's diary
- The Dutch progressive symphonic metal band Ex Libris released ANN, a trilogy of EPs inspired by historical figures, the third and final part telling the story of Anne Frank in three songs titled The Diary, The Annex and The Raid, with lyrics by Dianne van Giersbergen.
- Bob Dylan's 2020 song "I Contain Multitudes" contains the lyric "I’m just like Anne Frank - like Indiana Jones / And them British bad boys the Rolling Stones / I go right to the edge - I go right to the end / I go right where all things lost - are made good again". When asked about the lyric in a New York Times interview, Dylan responded that Frank's story was "profound".

== Films ==
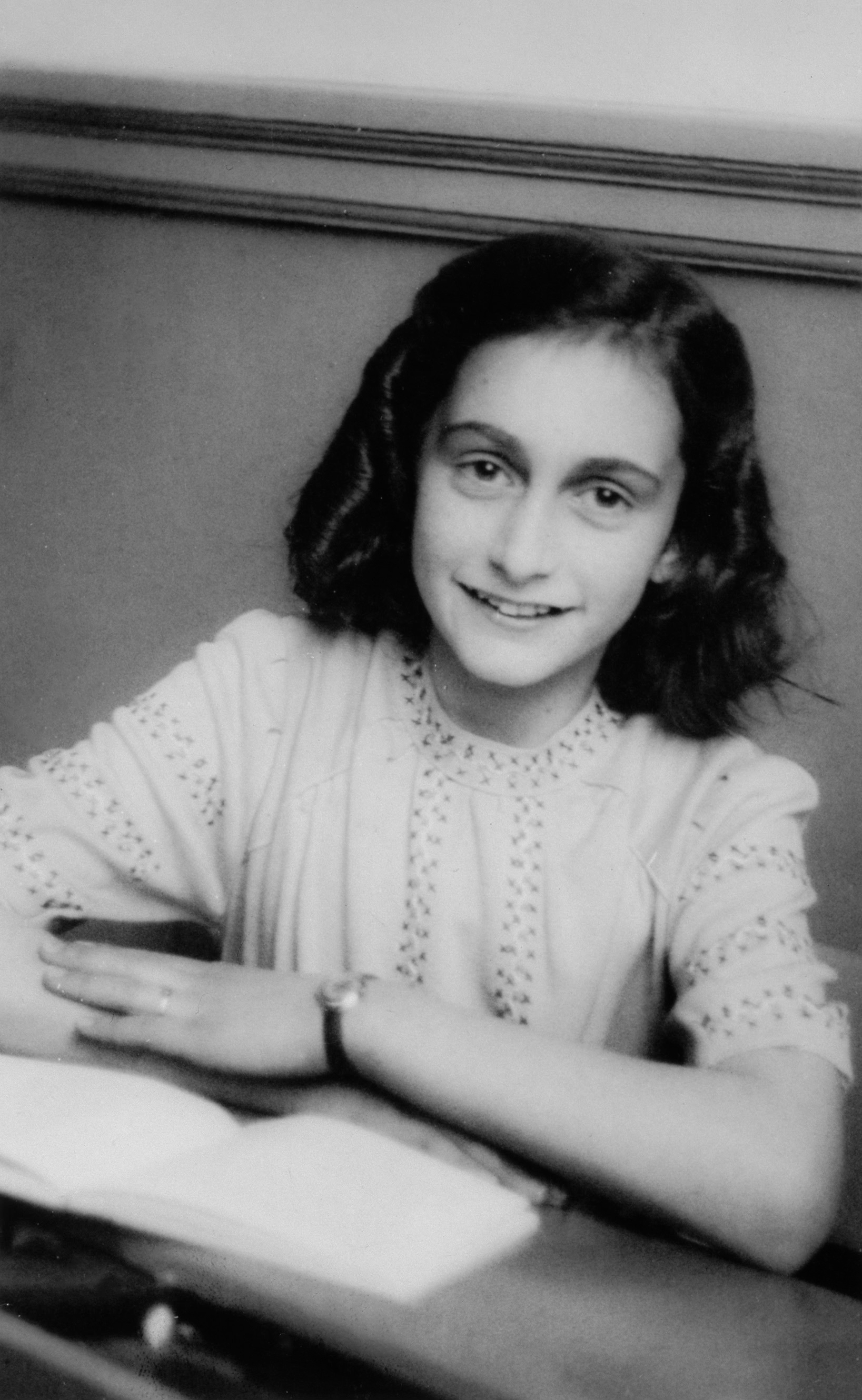
Anne Frank in December 1941.

This is a list of biographical films of Anne Frank and film adaptations of her diaries. (The only known footage of Frank herself is in a video of a neighbor's wedding taken on 22 July 1941; she appears nine seconds into the 20 second film. The Anne Frank House museum has posted it to YouTube.)

Year	Country	Title	Director	Notes
1958	East Germany	Das Tagebuch der Anne Frank	Emil Stöhr	Television
1959	United States	The Diary of Anne Frank	George Stevens	Film
1959	Yugoslavia	Dnevnik Ane Frank	Mirjana Samardzic	Television
1962	Netherlands	Dagboek van Anne Frank	Unknown	Television
1967	United States	The Diary of Anne Frank	Alex Segal	Television
1979	Japan	Anne no nikki: Anne Frank monogatari	Eiji Okabe	Animated TV special by Nippon Animation
1980	United States	The Diary of Anne Frank	Boris Sagal	Television
1985	Netherlands	Het dagboek van Anne Frank	Jeroen Krabbé, Hank Onrust	Television
1987	United Kingdom	The Diary of Anne Frank	Gareth Davies	Television
1988	United States	The Attic: The Hiding of Anne Frank	John Erman	Television
1988	Netherlands	Laatste Zeven Maanden van Anne Frank (The Last Seven Months of Anne Frank)	Willy Lindwer	Television Documentary
1995	United States; United Kingdom; Netherlands	Anne Frank Remembered	Jon Blair	Cinema and Television Documentary
1995	Japan	Anne no nikki	Akinori Nagaoka	Anime adaptation of the Diary of Anne Frank
1999	France	Le Journal d'Anne Frank	Julian Y. Wolff	Film; animated version of Anne Frank's diary. Edited from Anne no nikki.
2001	United States; Czech Republic	Anne Frank: The Whole Story	Robert Dornhelm	Television; some depictions in this version are disputed. Not endorsed by the Anne Frank Foundation.
2001	Netherlands	Het Korte Leven van Anne Frank	Gerrit Netten	Television Documentary
2007	United States	Freedom Writers	Richard LaGravenese	Film; The Diary of Anne Frank is an essential element to the film's plot
2008	Israel	Classmates of Anne Frank	Eyal Boers	Film & Television; Documentary
2009	United Kingdom	The Diary of Anne Frank	Jon Jones	Television
2009	Italy	Mi Ricordo Anna Frank	Alberto Negrin	Television
2015	Germany	Meine Tochter Anne Frank	Raymond Ley	Television documentary
2016	Germany	Das Tagebuch der Anne Frank	Hans Steinbichler	Cinema
2016	United States	No Asylum: The Untold Chapter in Anne Frank's Story	Paula Fouce	Documentary
2017	United States	Love All You Have Left	Matt Sivertson	Film
2021	Belgium; France; Luxembourg; Netherlands; Israel	Where Is Anne Frank	Ari Folman	Animated film
2021	Netherlands	My Best Friend Anne Frank	Ben Sombogaart	Film
2023	USA	A Small Light	Susanna Fogel, Tony Phelan, Leslie Hope	TV Mini Series

== Television programs ==
- The comedy show Robot Chicken ran a tongue-in-cheek sketch depicting a preview for a teen film about Anne Frank. It referenced many teen film clichés (such as casting Hilary Duff as Anne, and having her dot the letter i in her diary with hearts) and included a teen pop song. It ended with the tagline "Nazis are so uncool".
- The animated show Family Guy had Peter discussing how his appetite had previously gotten him into trouble. The scene cuts to black-and-white footage of Anne Frank and family crouched in an attic, with the Nazis downstairs looking for them, only to hear a loud crunch. They look over, to find Peter loudly and slowly eating potato chips (implying that he was responsible for their having been found out).
- In one episode of the 1990s TV show My So-Called Life, Angela, after her class read The Diary of Anne Frank, says she thinks Anne Frank was lucky because "she was trapped in an attic for three years with this guy she really liked".
- In a Season 2 episode of Dance Moms, Brooke performed an acrobatics solo titled “The Diary of Anne Frank.” The entire solo was centred around the book with the red and white checkered diary being her main prop.
- In The Venture Bros. episode "Tag Sale! You're It", Henchman 21 and Henchman 24 have a debate on who would win in a fantasy fist fight, Anne Frank or Lizzie Borden.
- In The Sarah Silverman Program, Sarah recites a portion out of the diary in the Little Miss Rainbow Pageant.
- In an episode of 8 Simple Rules, Bridget gets the role of Anne Frank in the school play.
- In the two-part episode "I Am Anne Frank" of the second season of American Horror Story, Franka Potente portrays an adult Anne Frank, having escaped Auschwitz concentration camp under the alias "Charlotte Brown".
- In the miniseries A Small Light, which depicts the period Anne Frank and her family goes into hiding, Anne is portrayed by Billie Boullet.

== Theatre plays ==
- The Diary of Anne Frank — premiered on October 5, 1955.
- The Bernard Kops play Dreams of Anne Frank (1992) re-imagines her concealment in Amsterdam, using elements of fantasy and song.
- And Then They Came for Me — by James Still.

== Others ==
- 5535 Annefrank — an asteroid named after Anne Frank.
- Marc Chagall — illustrated a limited edition of The Diary of Anne Frank.
- The city of Boise, Idaho erected an Anne Frank memorial in response to concerns about neo-Nazis making a home in northern Idaho cities such as Coeur d'Alene On May 10, 2017 it was discovered that vandals had defaced the memorial with racist and anti-Semitic language.
- Anne Frank: The Diary of a Young Girl — a 1952 radio play by Meyer Levin.
