= An Evening with Jerry Herman =

- Playbill from the Broadway production
- Music: Jerry Herman
- Lyrics: Jerry Herman
- Productions: 1998 Broadway

An Evening with Jerry Herman is a musical revue of Jerry Herman's work and consists of songs written by him for several of his musicals and anecdotes about Herman's career.

== Productions ==
The revue ran on Broadway at the Booth Theatre from July 28, 1998, until August 23, 1998, after 13 previews. Directed and choreographed by Lee Roy Reams, it starred Reams, Florence Lacey, and Herman, with Herman also providing piano accompaniment, along with Jered Egan on bass. Herman received a Theatre World Award Special Award.

The show premiered at the Westport Country Playhouse (Connecticut) in July 1997.

The revue is similar to two 1970s recordings of Herman songs recorded live in concert, one titled Rainbow & Stars: An Evening With Jerry Herman, featuring Karen Morrow, Reams and Herman; and the other titled An Evening With Jerry Herman (1974) featuring Lisa Kirk, Joe Masiell, Carol Dorian and Herman, both available on CD.

The revue followed a 1985 Broadway revue of Herman's work, titled Jerry's Girls.

== Songs ==
Act I

- Shalom (from Milk and Honey)
- Put On Your Sunday Clothes (from Hello, Dolly!)
- It Only Takes a Moment (from Hello, Dolly!)
- Before the Parade Passes By (from Hello, Dolly!)
- So Long, Dearie (from Hello, Dolly!)
- Ribbons Down My Back (from Hello, Dolly!)
- Dancing (from Hello, Dolly!)
- Penny in My Pocket (from Hello, Dolly!)
- Hello, Dolly! (from Hello, Dolly!)
- It's Today (from Mame)
- Gooch's Song (from Mame)
- We Need a Little Christmas (from Mame)
- If He Walked Into My Life (from Mame)
- Mame (from Mame)

Act II

- I Don't Want to Know (from Dear World)
- Movies Were Movies (from Mack and Mabel)
- I Won't Send Roses (from Mack and Mabel)
- Hundreds of Girls (from Mack and Mabel)
- Time Heals Everything (from Mack and Mabel)
- Tap Your Troubles Away (from Mack and Mabel)
- Movies Were Movies (Reprise) (from Mack and Mabel)
- I Belong Here (from The Grand Tour)
- Mrs. S.L. Jacobowsky (from The Grand Tour)
- I'll Be Here Tomorrow (from The Grand Tour)
- La Cage aux Folles (from La Cage Aux Folles)
- Song on the Sand (from La Cage aux Folles)
- I Am What I Am (from La Cage aux Folles)
- The Best of Times (from La Cage aux Folles)
- The Best Christmas of All (from Mrs. Santa Claus)
