= Showtune (musical) =

Musical revue from 2003

- Logo, 2003 New York Production
- Music: Jerry Herman
- Lyrics: Jerry Herman
- Book: Paul Gilger
- Productions: 1985 San Francisco; 1998 West End; 2003 Off-Broadway

Showtune is a musical revue celebrating the words and music of Broadway composer and lyricist Jerry Herman. Its title was inspired by Herman's autobiography of the same name. The revue's original title was Tune the Grand Up. After its 1985 San Francisco premiere and several regional productions through the 1990s, the piece played in the West End in 1998 under the title The Best of Times, and Off-Broadway in 2003, titled Showtune.

The forty songs featured in Showtune come from Herman's Broadway musicals Milk and Honey (1961), Hello, Dolly! (1964), Mame (1966), Dear World (1969), Mack & Mabel (1974), The Grand Tour (1979), A Day in Hollywood / A Night in the Ukraine (1980), and La Cage aux Folles (1983).

Conceived by Paul Gilger, the revue has no dialogue. Its songs are grouped into thematic scenes that tell stories and place a strong emphasis on Herman's lyrics and their optimistic messages. The song-cycle format creates dramatic sub-texts giving through-lines to the show.

== Scene and Song List ==
Act I

- It's Today! (Mame)
- Big Time (Mack & Mabel)
- We Need a Little Christmas (Mame)
- Put On Your Sunday Clothes (Hello, Dolly!)
- Little More Mascara (La Cage aux Folles)
- The Man In the Moon (Mame)
- I Am What I Am (La Cage aux Folles)
- Song On the Sand – Prelude (La Cage aux Folles)
- I Won't Send Roses (Mack & Mabel)
- Ribbons Down My Back (Hello, Dolly!)
- Dancing (Hello, Dolly!)
- It Takes a Woman (Hello, Dolly!)
- Wherever He Ain't (Mack & Mabel)
- Hundreds of Girls (Mack & Mabel)
- So Long Dearie (Hello, Dolly!)
- It Takes a Woman – Reprise
- And I Was Beautiful (Dear World)
- Kiss Her Now (Dear World)
- And I Was Beautiful / Kiss Her Now – Counterpoint
- Time Heals Everything (Mack & Mabel)
- Before the Parade Passes By (Hello, Dolly!)
- One Person (Dear World)
- Open a New Window (Mame)
- Counterpoint March
- Before the Parade Passes By – Reprise

Act II

- "Hello, Dolly!" – Entr'acte (Hello, Dolly!)
- Movies Were Movies (Mack & Mabel)
- Look What Happened to Mabel (Mack & Mabel)
- That's How Young I Feel (Mame)
- Look What Happened to Mabel – Reprise
- My Best Girl (Mame)
- Nelson (A Day in Hollywood/A Night in the Ukraine)
- Just Go to the Movies (A Day in Hollywood/A Night in the Ukraine)
- It Only Takes a Moment (Hello, Dolly!)
- Gooch's Song (Mame)
- Tap Your Troubles Away (Mack & Mabel)
- Bosom Buddies (Mame)
- I Don't Want to Know (Dear World)
- I Don't Want to Know – Reprise
- Song On the Sand (La Cage aux Folles)
- Shalom (Milk and Honey)
- I'll Be Here Tomorrow (The Grand Tour)
- If He Walked Into My Life (Mame)
- I Promise You a Happy Ending (Mack & Mabel)
- Mame (Mame)
- The Best of Times (La Cage aux Folles)
- It's Today! – Reprise
- Hello, Dolly! – Encore

== Synopsis ==
Act I

Herman's optimistic view of show business life is presented in "It's Today!", the opening number from Mame, and "Big Time", from Mack and Mabel. On the other hand, "We Need A Little Christmas" and "Put On Your Sunday Clothes!" present his strategies for dealing with bad news and hard times. In the latter number, the cast simulates a train, with the men's bowler hats becoming smokestacks and the ladies' parasols acting as the wheels. Backstage at a Cabaret, an actor makes up as "Zaza" the star of La Cage Aux Folles! ("A Little More Mascara"). A crescent moon descends, and Zaza performs "The Man in the Moon". The cast sings "I Am What I Am."

"The Four Seasons" is the theme for Herman's outlook on love. Spring is represented by "I Won't Send Roses", "Ribbons Down My Back" and "Dancing"; summer is a battle of the sexes, with "It Takes A Woman" (men) "Wherever He Ain't!" (women), "Hundreds of Girls" (men) and "So Long, Dearie" (women); and autumn includes "And I Was Beautiful" and "Kiss Her Now" (While She's Young), with the two songs then given in counterpoint. During these numbers, the warring couples reconcile. Finally, in winter, the sequence is philosophical: Although "Time Heals Everything", one must act "Before the Parade Passes By!", and "One Person" can change the world, if he or she will "Open a New Window".

Act II

As he thinks about the days of silent film, Mack Sennett recalls when "Movies Were Movies", and his love story is seen through the eyes of a cameraman who sings "Look What Happened to Mabel". Mabel dances a Charleston to "That's How Young I Feel". Jeanette MacDonald and Nelson Eddy perform "My Best Girl" on set for the umpteenth time, and she complains about his acting ("Nelson"). The company advises us to "Just Go to the Movies". A woman's unrequited love ("It Only Takes a Moment"), segues to a very pregnant Agnes Gooch who enters singing, "It only took a moment" and then her big number "Gooch's Song". A tap dancer encourages her to "Tap Your Troubles Away". Big production numbers for leading ladies follow: "Hello, Dolly!" and "Mame". The two divas sing "Bosom Buddies".

A serious and romantic segment follows, with "I Don't Want to Know", "Song on the Sand", "Shalom", "I'll Be Here Tomorrow", "If He Walked Into My Life" and "I Promise You a Happy Ending". These tender recollections yield to a big finale with a medley of production numbers "Mame", "The Best of Times" and a reprise of "It's Today". The cast takes its bows singing "Hello, Dolly!" and asks the audience to join in.

== Production history ==
=== San Francisco premiere ===
Showtune was originally titled Tune the Grand Up, and premiered May 1, 1985 at The 1177 Club in the Gramercy Towers on Nob Hill in San Francisco. The cabaret-style show was directed by Paul Gilger and Barbara Valente, with choreography by Valente. The show ran for 2 years. The cast was:

- John Nockels (Man 1)
- Darlene Popovic (Woman 1)
- James Followell (Man 2 and the pianist)
- Alma Sayles (Woman 2)
- David Broussal (Man 3)
- Lise-Marie Thomas (Woman 3)

Cindy Herron joined the cast in the second year as Woman 3.

=== California and Hawaii ===
In March 1987, a production of Tune the Grand Up opened at the Lyceum Space Theatre in San Diego, California. The show was directed and choreographed by Barbara Valente, with the cast that included Cindy Herron, John Nockels, Tim Connell, Mimi Unser, Darlene Popovic and James Followell. In September 1987, a third production of Tune the Grand Up was financed by actor Richard Smart at the 490 seat Kahilu Theatre in the town of Kamuela, Hawaii. The production was directed and supervised by Gilger. The cast again starred Nockels and Herron, who were joined by A.J. Holmes.

In 1996, producer Jennifer Strome optioned the rights to Tune the Grand Up and produced the subsequent productions of the revue from the 1996 production in the Delta King Riverboat Theatre in Sacramento, California, until the 2003 Off-Broadway production. The Sacramento cast included Nockels and Barry Lloyd.

In November 1996, Tune the Grand Up returned to San Francisco at the Alcazar Theatre. The production was supervised by Jerry Herman, directed by Jay Manley and choreographed by Barbara Valente, with musical direction by Barry Lloyd. The cast was Pierce Brandt, Dan Johnson, Michelle E. Jordan, Barry Lloyd, Marsha Mercant and Jan Wasser. Every member of the cast won a Hollywood Drama-Logue Award.

=== Off-West End ===
In 1998, the revue was produced twice in London, by Strome in association with Sharleen Cooper Cohen, with a new title, The Best of Times. It was directed and choreographed by Bill Starr. It was produced at the Bridewell Theatre, with the cast that featured Lindsay Hamilton, and Karen Evans.

=== West End ===
The Bridewell production transferred, in November 1998, to the Vaudeville Theatre in the West End. The cast was Garth Bardsley, Kathryn Evans, James Followell (pianist), Sarah Payne, Jamie Golding and Lindsay Hamilton.

=== New York tryout and Off-Broadway ===
In October 2002, the revue, now retitled Showtune, had an out-of-town tryout at the Helen Hayes Theatre in Nyack, New York. The production was directed and choreographed by Joey McKneely, with musical direction by James Followell. The cast was expanded from six to seven, with the addition of a fourth man.

- Martin Vidnovic (Man 1)
- Donna McKechnie (Woman 1)
- Paul Harman (Man 2)
- Sandy Binion (Woman 2)
- Tom Korbee (Man 3)
- Russell Arden Koplin (Woman 3)
- Bobby Peaco (Man 4 and the Pianist)

Showtune opened Off-Broadway at the York Theatre at St. Peter's, running from February 18, 2003 to April 13, 2003. The revue was produced by Jenny Strome and David Brown. The Off-Broadway production was also directed and choreographed by McKneely, with music direction by Followell and the same cast as the tryout, except that Karen Murphy replaced McKechnie.

=== Subsequent regional productions ===
In June 2003, Showtune played at the Pasadena Playhouse in Los Angeles. The production was directed by Bill Starr and Sheldon Epps, with choreography by Starr. The cast included Vidnovic, Peaco and Merle Dandridge.

In November 2003, the musical was presented at the Caldwell Theatre in Boca Raton, Florida. The production was directed by Michael Hall, with choreography by Barbara Flaten and musical direction by Bobby Peaco. The cast included Vidnovic and Peaco.

Since 2003, Showtune has been licensed for hundreds of productions in the United States, England, Scotland, Wales, Australia and Japan.

=== International productions ===
Showtune has been produced at the 2006 Edinburgh Festival Fringe. It has also been seen in 2008 at the Galaxy Theatre in Tokyo and at the Hyogo Performing Arts Center in Nishinomiya, Hyogo. The Japanese-language production was directed by Akio Miki with the all-female Takarazuka Revue Company.

== Cast recording ==
In 2004, a cast recording of Showtune was produced in New York City with the New York cast (except as noted). The conductor and music director was James Followell.

- Martin Vidnovic (Man 1)
- Karen Murphy (Woman 1)
- Paul Harman and Steve Wilson (Florida cast) (Man 2)
- Sandy Binion (Woman 2)
- Tom Korbee (Man 3)
- Stephanie Lynge (Los Angeles and Florida casts) (Woman 3)
- Bobby Peaco (Man 4 and the Pianist)

== Licensing ==
- Showtune page at Music Theatre International, United States licensing
- Showtune page at Josef Weinberger, United Kingdom licensing
- Showtune page at Hal Leonard, Australia licensing
