= Annelien =

Annelien is a feminine given name. Notable people with the name include:

- Annelien Bredenoord (born 1979), Dutch politician and professor of biomedical ethics
- Annelien Coorevits (born 1986), Belgian television presenter and model, Miss Belgium 2007
- Annelien de Dijn (born 1977), Belgian historian of political thought
- Annelien Kappeyne van de Coppello (1936–1990), Dutch politician
- Annelien Van Wauwe (born 1987), Belgian clarinettist

== See also ==
- Annelies
- Anneliese
