= The Diary of Anne Frank (disambiguation) =

The Diary of Anne Frank is a book based on the diary kept by Anne Frank during the Nazi occupation of the Netherlands.

The Diary of Anne Frank may also refer to:

== Film ==
- The Diary of Anne Frank (1959), American film directed by George Stevens
- Anne no Nikki (1995), Japanese anime film
- Das Tagebuch der Anne Frank (2016), German film directed by Hans Steinbichler

== Television ==
- The Diary of Anne Frank (1967 film), TV film directed by Alex Segal
- The Diary of Anne Frank (1980 film), TV adaptation directed by Boris Sagal
- The Diary of Anne Frank (1987 TV series), a 1987 BBC miniseries
- The Diary of Anne Frank (2009 TV series), a 2009 BBC adaptation directed by Jon Jones

== Others ==
- The Diary of Anne Frank (opera), mono-opera composed by Grigory Frid in 1968, first performed in 1972
- The Diary of Anne Frank (radio play) (1952), adaptation by Meyer Levin
- The Diary of Anne Frank (play) (premiered in 1955), stage adaptation by Frances Goodrich and Albert Hackett

== See also ==
- Anne Frank (disambiguation)
