= Jennifer Strome =

Jennifer Strome is an American producer and writer, focusing on script and show development.

== Career ==
Strome began her career in San Francisco at the Plush Room Cabaret as Entertainment Director, and with The Chamber Theatre Company as Associate managing director and assistant to the artistic director. In New York City, Strome has produced readings and off-Broadway productions including Goodnight Vienna at The Players Club, The Betrayal of Nora Blake at The Blue Heron Theatre, and the off-Broadway musical Suburb, co-produced with the York Theatre Company, winner of the Richard Rodgers Development Award.

Strome produced the Jerry Herman musical revue Showtune multiple times starting in San Francisco at the Alcazar Theatre followed by two London productions, one at the Bridewell Theatre off Fleet Street, followed by another at the Vaudeville Theatre in the West End. She produced the off-Broadway production of Showtune at the Theatre at St. Peter's Church in New York City with mentor and co-producer, the filmmaker, David Brown.

Strome re-created, produced and directed the original dramatic adaptation of The Diary of Anne Frank in 2009 at the Museum of Jewish Heritage in New York. Meyer Levin's radio play Anne Frank: The Diary of a Young Girl. The event featured a talkback with Cynthia Ozick, hosted by Neil Baldwin, PhD. In 2011, Strome's own play, The Idealist, an account of Levin's quest to bring The Diary of Anne Frank to the stage, was performed at the Times Center starring Alison Pill and Tony Roberts. as a one night only reading to benefit The Anne Frank Center in Basel, Switzerland

Strome is a member of Dramatists Guild, Writers Guild of America and The League of Off-Broadway Theatres and Producers.
