= The Short Life of Anne Frank =

2001 film by Gerrit Netten

- Original title: Het korte leven van Anne Frank
- Written by: Gerrit Netten; Wouter van der Sluis
- Directed by: Gerrit Netten
- Music by: Vincent van Rooijen

Production
- Editor: Gerrit Netten

Original release
- Release: 2001

The Short Life of Anne Frank (Dutch: Het Korte Leven van Anne Frank), also occasionally referred to as The Brief Life of Anne Frank, is a 2001 Dutch television documentary film about the life of diarist Anne Frank. It was directed by Gerrit Netten. The film was narrated by several actors, including Jeremy Irons, Joachim Krol, and Bram Bart. Thekla Reuten and Nicky Morris provided voices for Anne Frank. The film includes the only known footage of Anne Frank (taken in 1941), a video of Otto Frank in English (taken in the 1960s), and some pages from the original diary of Anne Frank are also videoed in the film.

== Synopsis ==
Narrated by Jeremy Irons, Joachim Krol, and Bram Bart, the film covers the life and death of Anne Frank. It features footage of Frank and an interview with her father Otto, who was instrumental in the publication of her diary after he was freed from Auschwitz.

== Cast ==
- Thekla Reuten and Nicky Morris as Voice of Anne Frank (voice)
- Bram Bart, Jeremy Irons, and Joachim Król as Narrator

== Release ==
The Short Life of Anne Frank released in 2001. Since its release it has frequently been screened as part of several historical exhibits about Anne Frank. A copy of the film is held in the collections of the United States Holocaust Memorial Museum.

== Reception ==
After its release the film has received reviews from the Library Journal, School Library Journal, The Video Librarian, and Library Media Connection.
