= Bernard Kops =

British poet and dramatist (1926–2024)

Bernard Kops (28 November 1926 – 25 February 2024) was a British dramatist, memoirist, poet and novelist. He born and raised in Stepney Green in the East End of London, the son of Dutch-Jewish immigrants, the father having come from Amsterdam around 1902. He was an extremely prolific writer. He wrote many plays for television, stage and radio; nine novels; seven volumes of poetry and two autobiographies. In 2009, Queen Elizabeth II bestowed a Civil List pension on him.

== Early life ==
Kops recalled that his political education started young. He was present as a boy at the Battle of Cable Street on 4 October 1936. Upon the onset of World War II, he and his young sister were evacuated from London to Denham in Buckinghamshire, an experience which he recounted in Episode Two of Thames Television's TV series, The World at War, which was first broadcast in 1973. Around 1940, Kops received orders to join the Westminster Technical Institute in Brighton, in which he was trained to be a waiter, an occupation which he rejected. After having been moved inland to Dorking, Surrey, he left school and re-joined his parents in London. However, The Blitz forced his mother to take Kops and his three sisters to leave London for York, leaving his father to undertake war work and his brother Dave to serve in the army. Shortly after arriving in York, because of a succession of accommodation problems, the family moved to Leeds.

== Writing life ==
His first play, The Hamlet of Stepney Green, was produced at the Oxford Playhouse in 1957. It is considered to be one of the keystones of the "New Wave" in British 'kitchen sink' drama. First novel, Awake For Mourning (1958), followed the next year and has been appraised by critic Stewart Home as "ahead of its time". Ken Worpole has described Kops' first volume of autobiography, The World Is A Wedding (1963), as "one of the most important post-war English autobiographies". Kops' subsequent plays included Enter Solly Gold (1962), Ezra (1981, about Ezra Pound), Playing Sinatra (1991) and The Dreams of Anne Frank (1992, about Anne Frank). Kops also wrote extensively for radio and television. His radio play Monster Man (1999) is about the creator of "King Kong", Willis O'Brien. In 1971-2, Kops wrote two series of sitcom Alexander the Greatest for ATV.

Kops wrote the television movie script Just One Kid for director/producer John Goldschmidt; the film was broadcast on the ITV Network in 1974, and won a Silver Hugo Award at the Chicago Film Festival. Kops then wrote the television film It's a Lovely Day Tomorrow (1975), about the Bethnal Green tube disaster of 1943, also for John Goldschmidt, and this was nominated for an International Emmy Award for Drama Series.

In addition to writing plays, novels and autobiography, Kops also wrote volumes of poetry and travelogues, including a series of articles about a trip to the United States (1999) and another about a journey to China (2000), both of which were written for The Guardian.

== Later life ==
In 1956 Kops married Erica Eve Gordon; with whom he had four children. Kops and his wife were the models for characters Mannie and Miriam Katz in Colin MacInnes' novel Absolute Beginners (1959). In 1975, suffering from drug addiction, Kops made a suicide attempt; he wrote about the incident and his successful journey to sobriety in his second autobiography, Shalom Bomb: Scenes from My Life. In 2009, Kops was awarded a civil list pension in recognition for his services to literature. In 2016 filmmaker Jill Campbell directed a documentary on Bernard Kops, The Hamlet of Canfield Gardens, referencing his first play and longstanding West Hampstead address.

Kops died on 25 February 2024, at the age of 97.

== Selected bibliography ==
=== Novels ===
- Awake for Mourning (MacGibbon & Kee), 1958)
- Motorbike (New English Library, 1962)
- Yes from No-Man's Land (MacGibbon & Kee, 1965)
- The Dissent of Dominick Shapiro (MacGibbon & Kee, 1966)
- By the Waters of Whitechapel (Bodley Head, 1969)
- The Passionate Past of Gloria Gaye (Secker and Warburg, 1971)
- Settle Down Simon Katz (Secker and Warburg, 1973)
- Partners (Secker and Warburg, 1975)
- On Margate Sands (Secker and Warburg, 1978)
- The Odyssey of Samuel Glass (David Paul, 2012)

=== Plays ===
- The Hamlet of Stepney Green (1959)
- The Dream Of Peter Mann (1960)
- Four Plays (The Hamlet of Stepney Green, Enter Solly Gold, Home Sweet Honeycomb, The Lemmings) (1964)
- Playing Sinatra (1992)
- Dreams Of Anne Frank (1993)
- Plays One (Playing Sinatra, The Hamlet of Stepney Green, Ezra) (Oberon Books, 1999)
- Plays Two (Dreams of Anne Frank, On Margate Sands, Call in the Night) (Oberon Books, 2000)
- Plays Three (The Dream of Peter Mann, Enter Solly Gold, Who Shall I Be Tomorrow?) (Oberon Books, 2001)

=== Poetry ===
- Poems (Bell & Baker Press, 1955)
- Poems and Songs (Scorpion Press, 1958)
- An Anemone For Antigone (1959)
- Erica I Want To Read You Something (1967)
- For the Record – Poems (Secker and Warburg, 1971)
- Barricades In West Hampstead (1988)
- Grandchildren and Other Poems (2000)
- Where Do People Go (The Happy Dragons' Press, 2004)
- This Room in the Sunlight: Collected Poems (David Paul, 2009)
- Anne Frank's Fragments from Nowhere (Indigo Dreams Publishing, 2015)
- Love, Death and Other Joys (David Paul, 2018)

=== Autobiography & misc. ===
- The World is a Wedding (MacGibbon & Kee, 1963; Five Leaves Publications, 2007)
- Neither Your Honey Nor Your Sting: An Offbeat History of the Jews (Robson, 1985)
- Shalom Bomb: Scenes from My Life (Oberon Books, 2000)
- Bernard Kops’ East End (Five Leaves Publications, 2006) [anthology]

== Secondary literature ==
- William Baker and Jeanette Roberts Shumaker: Bernard Kops - fantasist, London Jew, apocalyptic humorist, Madison [u.a.]: Fairleigh Dickinson University Press, 2014, ISBN 978-1-61147-656-9.

== See also ==
- Cultural depictions of Anne Frank
- Emanuel Litvinoff
