= Anne Frank (disambiguation) =

Anne Frank (1929–1945) was a young Jewish girl and an Austrian-born diarist.

Anne Frank may also refer to:

- Anne Frank: The Biography, a biography of Anne Frank by Melissa Müller
- Anne Frank: The Diary of a Young Girl, the diary of Anne Frank
- Anne Frank: The Whole Story, a television mini-series about Anne Frank by Robert Dornhelm
- My Best Friend Anne Frank, Dutch drama film recounting the story of Hannah Pick-Goslar, directed by Ben Sombogaart
- 5535 Annefrank, an inner main-belt asteroid

== See also ==
- The Diary of Anne Frank (disambiguation)
- Ann Frank Lewis (born Ann C. Frank, 1937), American political strategist
