= Annelies =

Annelies may refer to:

- Annelies (given name), a list of notable people with the name Annelies
- Annelies (novel), a 2019 alternative history novel by David R. Gillham
- Annelies (Whitbourn), a 2005 choral work composed by James Whitbourn based on The Diary of Anne Frank
