= Donald Saddler =

American choreographer, dancer, and theatre director

Donald Edward Saddler
- Born: January 24, 1918; Van Nuys, California, USA
- Died: November 1, 2014 (aged 96); Englewood, New Jersey
- Occupations: Choreographer, dancer

Donald Edward Saddler (January 24, 1918 – November 1, 2014) was an American choreographer, dancer, and theatre director.

== Biography ==
Born in Van Nuys, California, Saddler studied dance at an early age to regain his strength after a bout of scarlet fever. He spent his school vacations at the MGM studios, eventually dancing in the chorus of movie musicals such as The Great Ziegfeld (1936), Rosalie (1937), Broadway Melody of 1938 (1937), Babes in Arms (1939), and The Wizard of Oz (1939) .

Saddler was an original member of the American Ballet Theatre, appearing in Giselle, Pillar of Fire, and Fancy Free before heading overseas to serve in World War II. When he returned, he decided to forego ballet in favor of Broadway musicals, appearing in High Button Shoes (1947) and two 1950 revues, Dance Me a Song and Bless You All, before winning his first assignment as a choreographer for Wonderful Town in 1953, for which he won the Tony Award for Best Choreography.

In 1958, Saddler won critical acclaim for his choreography for a Jacob's Pillow Dance Festival "dance drama" adaptation of Sherwood Anderson's Winesburg, Ohio, in which he also performed.

Saddler has directed Together on Broadway: Mary Martin and Ethel Merman, George Abbott: Celebration, and I Hear Music of Frank Loesser and Friends, a concert featuring the composer's widow, Jo Sullivan. He won another Tony for his choreography of the 1971 revival of No, No, Nanette and earned other nominations and awards during his extensive career as a Broadway choreographer. Saddler directed the 1988 Broadway reunion of prima ballerina Cynthia Gregory and danseur Fernando Bujones.

His choreographic work for feature films includes April in Paris, Young at Heart, By the Light of the Silvery Moon, and Radio Days. For television he staged the dance routines for Verna: U.S.O. Girl, a presentation of the PBS series Great Performances starring Sissy Spacek and William Hurt. In 2001, at the age of 81, Saddler was featured in the Broadway revival of Follies, performing the adagio with fellow dance veteran Marge Champion. Champion and Saddler remained friends after the production and became the subjects of a short film, Keep Dancing, about the two dancers leading meaningful lives at age 90.

In 2004, Saddler directed a staged reading of Only a Kingdom at The John Drew Theater of Guild Hall in East Hampton, NY. Among the well-known performers in the cast were Kaitlin Hopkins, George S. Irving, Dina Merrill, Marni Nixon and Jo Ann Worley. He died at the age of 96 on November 1, 2014.

== Stage credits ==
- 1953: Shangri-La
- 1961: Milk and Honey
- 1971: No, No, Nanette
- 1973: Much Ado About Nothing
- 1974: Good News
- 1975: Rodgers & Hart: A Musical Revue
- 1976: The Robber Bridegroom
- 1979: The Grand Tour
- 1980: Happy New Year
- 1983: On Your Toes
- 1987: Teddy & Alice
- 1993: My Fair Lady
- 2000: Follies

== Awards and nominations ==
Awards

- 1953 Tony Award for Best Choreographer – Wonderful Town
- 1971 Tony Award for Best Choreography – No, No, Nanette
- 1971 Drama Desk Award for Outstanding Choreography – No, No, Nanette
- 1984 Dance Magazine Lifetime Achievement Award
- 2006 Capezio Dance Lifetime Achievement Award

Nominations

- 1975 Drama Desk Award for Outstanding Choreography – Good News
- 1973 Tony Award for Best Choreography – Much Ado About Nothing
- 1977 Drama Desk Award for Outstanding Choreography – The Robber Bridegroom
- 1983 Drama Desk Award for Outstanding Choreography – On Your Toes
- 1983 Tony Award for Best Choreography – On Your Toes
