= Lee Roy Reams =

American actor and singer (born 1942)

Lee Reams
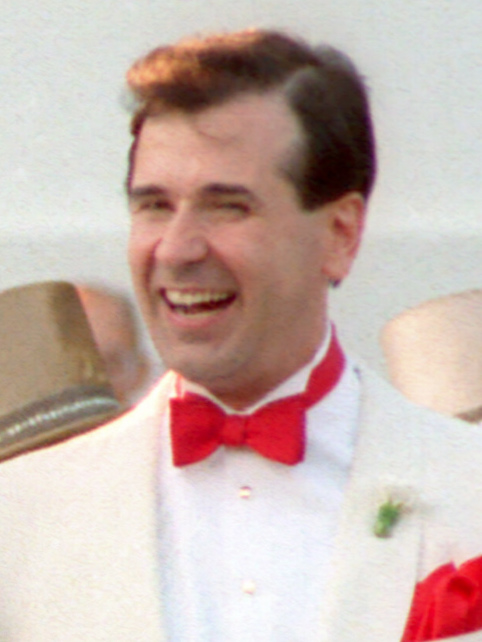
- Reams in 1988
- Born: August 23, 1942 (age 84); Covington, Kentucky, US
- Occupations: Actor; singer; dancer; choreographer; director
- Years active: 1966–present
- Spouse: Bob Donahoe 1969-2019

Lee Roy Reams (born August 23, 1942) is an American musical theatre actor, singer, dancer, choreographer, and director.

== Early life and career ==
Born in Covington, Kentucky, Reams earned a Master of Arts degree and was awarded an honorary doctorate from the Conservatory of Music at the University of Cincinnati. He started as a back up dancer for Juliet Prowse. He made his Broadway debut in Sweet Charity in 1966. In Hollywood, Lee Roy worked on the Danny Kaye, Red Skelton, Dean Martin, and Carol Burnett shows. Returning to New York, he joined The Peter Gennaro Dancers on The Ed Sullivan Show.

Reams was nominated for both the Tony and Drama Desk Awards as Best Featured Actor in a Musical for his performance in the original Broadway production of 42nd Street in 1980. He played the role of Frank Schultz in the 1989 Paper Mill Playhouse production of Show Boat, which was televised on Great Performances by PBS.

Reams has appeared on concert stages and in cabarets throughout the country. At present he is serving as the resident director of the Theatre at Sea program sponsored by the Theatre Guild.

== Personal life ==
Lee Roy Reams is openly gay. He was in a relationship with Bob Donahoe for 50 years, from 1969 until 2019. For the last four years, they were legally married, until Donohoe's death in 2019.

== Broadway credits ==
- 1966: Sweet Charity (Young Spanish Man)
- 1969: Oklahoma! (Will Parker)
- 1970: Applause (Duane Fox)
- 1974: Lorelei (Henry Spofford)
- 1978: Hello, Dolly! (Cornelius Hackl)
- 1980: 42nd Street (Billy Lawlor)
- 1983: La Cage aux Folles (Albin/Zaza)
- 1994: Beauty and the Beast (Lumiere)
- 1995: Hello, Dolly! (Choreographer)
- 1998: An Evening with Jerry Herman (Co-star & Director)
- 2006: The Producers (Roger DeBris)

== Film and television credits ==
- 1968: Sweet Charity (Dancer)
- 1987: Leg Work
- 1989: Great Performances (Frank Schultz)
- 2017: Nunsense (The Saint)
- 2018: Theater Talk (Himself)
