= Paul Gilger =

American architect

Edgewater, 2003

Paul Douglass Gilger (born October 13, 1954 in Mansfield, Ohio) is an architect, set designer, playwright and cartographer.

== Playwrighting ==
Gilger conceived the 2003 off-Broadway Jerry Herman musical revue Showtune.

== Architecture ==
In 1991, Gilger was the project designer for the Industrial Light and Magic Film Studio in San Rafael, California for filmmaker George Lucas (Star Wars, Indiana Jones) and in 1989, he helped prepare conceptual designs for the Disney/MGM Film Studios in Tokyo, Japan.

Gilger was a Senior Project Designer with Hedgpeth Architects in Santa Rosa, California, for over 30 years.

== Set design ==
With Nomad Productions Scenic Studios in San Francisco, Gilger worked on concert touring sets for Madonna (1985 Like a Virgin Tour), Kenny Loggins, Crosby Stills & Nash, Carlos Santana, Alabama, Dio, and Petra, stage sets for Whoopi Goldberg and Anthony Newley (the 1983 musical Chaplin), set pieces for the Super Bowl broadcast, and numerous sets for television. He has designed numerous stage sets for theatre companies in Ohio and California.

== Lincoln Highway ==
Gilger is the chair of the Lincoln Highway Association National Mapping Committee. In 2012, Gilger completed the cartography of the entire Lincoln Highway, creating the online Official Map of the Lincoln Highway, a 20-year project involving research by 25 members of the committee. Additionally, Gilger serves as a tour guide for the Association.

== In popular culture ==
Gilger's name is used for one of the characters in the popular Japanese manga series Bleach created by Tite Kubo, who named most of the Espada characters after architects. The character "Nnoitra Gilga" is named after Richard Neutra and Paul Gilger.

== Background & education ==
Gilger is a 1978 graduate of the University of Cincinnati College of Design, Architecture, Art, and Planning, with study in theatrical set design at University of Cincinnati College-Conservatory of Music.

His sister, Joan Gilger Stear, was Miss Ohio 1978.

Gilger resides in Santa Rosa, California.
