= Jerry's Girls =

1985 Broadway musical revue

- Original Cast Recording
- Music: Jerry Herman
- Lyrics: Jerry Herman
- Basis: Revue of Jerry Herman's songs
- Productions: 1985 Broadway; 2015 London; 2015 Melbourne

Jerry's Girls is a musical revue based on the songs of composer/lyricist Jerry Herman.

== Production history ==
Created by Herman and Larry Alford in 1981, the show originated as a modest presentation at Onstage, a nightclub located in the Theater District in Midtown Manhattan, New York City. The revue consisted of four actresses and Herman. Writing in The New York Times, John S. Wilson called it "a brilliantly lively and scintillating evening of cabaret."

After La Cage aux Folles opened to rave reviews two years later, producer Zev Buffman approached the pair and suggested they mount a full-scale, all-star version. On February 28, 1984, the expanded Jerry's Girls premiered at the Royal Poinciana Playhouse in Palm Beach, Florida, with Carol Channing, Andrea McArdle, and Leslie Uggams, backed by an all-female chorus, recreating scenes and songs from Herman's hits, including Hello, Dolly!, Mame, and Mack and Mabel. Jerry's Girls, the show's opening number set to the music of "It's Today" from Mame, enumerated the many actresses who had appeared in Herman's shows over the years. The show then toured, playing at the Kennedy Center's Eisenhower Theater for six weeks in June 1984. The revue went on to play engagements in 1984: in Kansas City, Missouri, Seattle, Vancouver, British Columbia, San Francisco, Denver, Oklahoma City, Oklahoma, and New Orleans. An original cast recording was released by Polydor Records.

The revue premiered on Broadway, directed by Alford and choreographed by Wayne Cilento, on December 18, 1985 at the St. James Theatre, where it ran for 141 performances and 14 previews. Uggams was joined by new cast members Dorothy Loudon and Chita Rivera. (Channing had other commitments and Chita Rivera was cast for her strong dancing.) A chorus of eight singers was added. Some reviewers praised the revue, with Clive Barnes writing "It can stay at the St. James Theatre forever, at the very least."

In a critical review, Frank Rich of The New York Times wrote "The only thing that Jerry's Girls has in common with a bona fide Jerry Herman musical is that it occupies the St. James, the theater where Dolly once promised she'd never go away again... Whatever the point of the all-female cast, one must still wonder why the show's particular female stars were chosen. None of them have been associated with Mr. Herman's musicals. Only one (Miss Uggams) is primarily a singer. All three have strident mannerisms that the director, Larry Alford, takes sadistic glee in calling to our attention."

Chita Rivera received a nomination for the Tony Award for Best Performance by a Leading Actress in a Musical.

=== International productions ===
An Australian production featuring Debbie Byrne, Judi Connelli, Marcia Hines and Jeanne Little played in Sydney and Melbourne in 1987. It was staged by Alford with set and costume design by Roger Kirk.

The revue was presented in London at the St. James Studio in March 2015, Produced by Katy Lipson for Aria Entertainment and Guy James, starring Anna-Jane Casey, Ria Jones and Sarah-Louise Young, with direction by Kate Golledge and choreography by Matthew Cole. The revue transferred to the Off-West End Jermyn Street Theatre for a 3-week run in May 2015, with Emma Barton, Ria Jones and Sarah-Louise Young. The reviewer of the Jermyn Street Theatre production wrote: "When all three are singing and dancing together, the production cannot be faulted. The harmonies are strong and secure, and give real substance to Herman’s magnificent tunes."

The Production Company presented the revue at the Playhouse, Arts Centre, Melbourne, Australia from 21 November to 6 December 2015. This production included eleven leading actresses. The director Dean Bryant set the revue in a rehearsal hall.

== Original cast album song list ==
Act I

- Jerry's Girls
- It Takes a Woman/Put On Your Sunday Clothes (from Hello, Dolly!)
- It Only Takes a Moment (from Hello, Dolly!)
- Wherever He Ain't (from Mack & Mabel)
- "We Need a Little Christmas" (from Mame)
- I Won't Send Roses (from Mack & Mabel)
- Tap Your Troubles Away (from Mack & Mabel)
- Two-a-Day (from Parade)
- Bosom Buddies (from Mame)
- The Man in the Moon (from Mame)
- So Long Dearie (from Hello, Dolly!)
- Take It All Off
- Two-a-Day (reprise)
- Shalom (from Milk and Honey)
- Milk and Honey (from Milk and Honey)
- Show Tune (from Parade)
- If He Walked Into My Life (from Mame)
- "Hello Dolly!" (from Hello, Dolly!)

Act II

- Entr'acte
- Just Go to the Movies (from A Day in Hollywood/A Night in the Ukraine)
- Movies Were Movies (from Mack & Mabel)
- Look What Happened to Mabel (from Mack & Mabel)
- Nelson (from A Day in Hollywood/A Night in the Ukraine)
- Just Go to the Movies (reprise)
- Time Heals Everything (from Mack & Mabel)
- It's Today (from Mame)
- "Mame" (from Mame)
- Kiss Her Now (from Dear World)
- That's How Young I Feel (from Mame)
- Open A New Window (from Mame)
- Gooch's Song (from Mame)
- Before the Parade Passes By (from Hello, Dolly!)
- I Don't Want To Know (from Dear World)
- Song On the Sand (from La Cage aux Folles)
- "I Am What I Am" (from La Cage aux Folles)
- The Best of Times (from La Cage aux Folles)
- Jerry's Turn (Jerry Herman and his Girls)
