= Annelies (novel) =

2019 novel by David R. Gillham

- First edition cover
- Author: David R. Gillham
- Audio read by: Saskia Maarleveld; David R. Gillham
- Language: English
- Publisher: Viking Press
- Publication date: January 15, 2019
- Publication place: United States
- Media type: Print (Hardcover)
- Pages: 405
- ISBN: 978-0-399-16258-9
- Dewey Decimal: 813/.6
- LC Class: PS3607.I44436 A85 2019

Annelies is a 2019 novel by David R. Gillham, which has a depiction of Anne Frank surviving her term in the Bergen-Belsen concentration camp and reuniting with her father, Otto Frank.

== Background ==
Gillham stated that he conceived of the novel after reading The Diary of Anne Frank while in his late 20s and wondering what works an adult Anne Frank would have written. He had prior attempts to write the novel, but the one that ultimately created the book started circa 2011.

As part of his research he conducted an interview of a Dutch person who was acquainted with Otto Frank, watched other interviews, and read memoirs of people who experienced Holocaust and other books about Anne Frank. He also did in-person visits of two concentration camps, Auschwitz-Birkenau and Bergen-Belsen, as well as doing a visit of Amsterdam. He was 61 when he released the novel. This is the second novel written by Gillham.

== Plot ==
The novel traces Anne's life and depicts her sister Margot Frank dying. After the war Otto conceals Anne's diary, and Anne becomes argumentative with him. Steve Pfarrer of Daily Hampshire Gazette wrote that Gillham's Anne "is alternately angry, despairing, and ridden with guilt". Anne Frank attempts to have a tryst with a boy and begins smoking cigarettes, and she receives criticism from other people who had experienced the Holocaust. After the diary is revealed Anne becomes less combative and uses the diary to highlight what happened to her to the public.

== Reception ==
Susan Ellingwood of The New York Times stated that Gillham "does a good job" in showing an Anne affected by survivor's guilt, but that the scenario between Anne and Otto annoyed her and "leave the reader disappointed with this girl they once loved." Ultimately Ellingwood believed the readers were already well-served by the original Diary of Anne Frank.

Patty Rhule of USA Today gave the book three of four stars. She concluded "a novel that reminds the world to remember Anne Frank is most welcome" even though "No novelist, however gifted, could rival the power of Anne Frank".

Publishers Weekly argued that the book was "disappointing", citing the post-war segment, and that it "never lives up to the promise of its premise" despite the "noble effort" and the quality of the research.

Kirkus Reviews stated that the writing quality was noticeably inferior to that of the original diary's and that "flat-footed storytelling weakens the impact"; it added that the concept was a "brave risk".

== See also ==
- Cultural depictions of Anne Frank
