= Annelien de Dijn =

Dutch historian

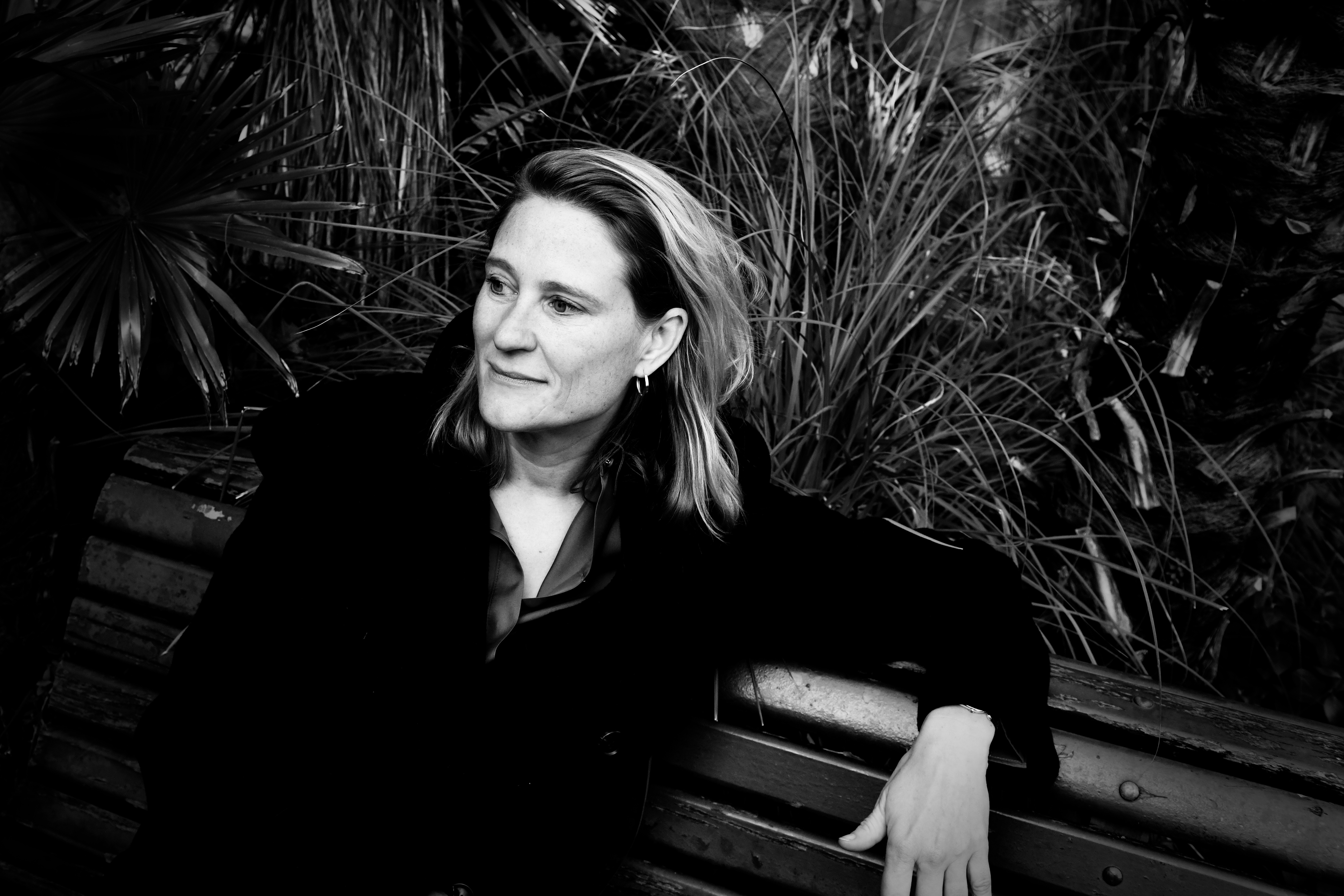
Annelien de Dijn

Annelien De Dijn (born 1977) is a Belgian historian of political thought. She is a professor of modern political history at Utrecht University.

== Career ==
After gaining her PhD from the Katholieke Universiteit Leuven (KU Leuven) in 2005, Annelien De Dijn worked as a postdoctoral fellow at Columbia University, the University of California, Berkeley, and the Notre Dame Institute for Advanced Study. From 2011 to 2017, she was an assistant professor at the University of Amsterdam. In January 2018, she became a professor of modern political history at Utrecht University.

Her book Freedom: An Unruly History won the 2021 PROSE Award for Philosophy from the Association of American Publishers.

== Works ==
- (ed. with Raf Geenens) Reading Tocqueville: From Oracle to Actor. Basingstoke; New York: Palgrave Macmillan, 2007.
- French Political Thought from Montesquieu to Tocqueville: liberty in a levelled society? Cambridge; New York: Cambridge University Press, 2008.
- Freedom: An Unruly History. Harvard University Press, 2020. ISBN 9780674988330
