= Jerry Herman =

American composer and lyricist (1931–2019)

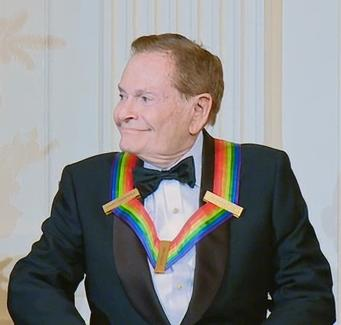
- Herman at the White House for the 2010 Kennedy Center Honors
- Born: July 10, 1931; New York City, U.S.
- Died: December 26, 2019 (aged 88); Miami, Florida, U.S.
- Monuments: Jerry Herman Ring Theatre, University of Miami, Coral Gables, Florida, U.S.
- Education: University of Miami (BA)
- Partner(s): Martin Finkelstein (d. 1990); Terry Marler (?–2019)
- Musical career
- Genre: Musical theatre
- Occupations: Composer, Lyricist
- Instrument: Piano
- Years active: 1954–2019
- Website: jerryherman.com

Gerald Sheldon Herman (July 10, 1931 – December 26, 2019) was an American composer and lyricist, known for his work in Broadway theatre.

One of the most commercially successful Broadway songwriters of his time, Herman was the composer and lyricist for a number of hit musicals, starting in the 1960s, that were characterized by an upbeat and optimistic outlook and what Herman called "the simple, hummable showtune". His shows include Hello, Dolly! (1964), at one time the longest-running musical in Broadway history, which also produced the hit title song for Louis Armstrong; Mame (1966), a vehicle for Angela Lansbury; and La Cage aux Folles (1983), the first hit Broadway musical about a gay couple.

In 2009, Herman received the Tony Award for Lifetime Achievement in the Theatre. He was a recipient of the 2010 Kennedy Center Honors.

== Early life ==
Herman was born in Manhattan and raised in Jersey City, New Jersey, the only child of musically inclined, middle-class Jewish parents. He learned to play piano at an early age, and he frequently attended Broadway musicals.

Herman's father Harry was a gym teacher and in the summer worked in the Catskill Mountains hotels. His mother Ruth (née Sachs) also worked in the hotels as a singer, pianist, and children's teacher, and eventually became an English teacher. Herman told People Magazine in 1986 that his mother, who died in 1954, long before his success on Broadway, "was glamorous like Mame and witty like Dolly."

After marrying, his parents lived in Jersey City and continued to work in the summers in various camps until they became head counselors and finally ran Stissing Lake Camp in the small town of Pine Plains, New York, in the Taconic Mountains. Herman spent all of his summers there, from age 6 to 23. It was at camp that he first became involved in theatrical productions, as director of Oklahoma!, Finian's Rainbow and A Tree Grows in Brooklyn. Herman graduated from Jersey City's Henry Snyder High School.

At age 17, Herman was introduced to Frank Loesser who, after hearing material he had written, urged him to continue composing. He left the Parsons School of Design to attend the University of Miami, which has one of the nation's most avant garde theater departments. While an undergraduate student at the University of Miami, Herman produced, wrote and directed a college musical called Sketchbook. It was scheduled to run for three performances, but the show was so popular it ran for an additional 17 performances. Herman belonged to the Zeta Beta Tau fraternity.

Herman graduated from the University of Miami in 1953 with a Bachelor of Arts degree in drama and received a Doctor of Fine Arts degree in 1980.

== Early career ==
Following his graduation from the University of Miami in 1953, Herman moved to New York City, where he produced the Off-Broadway revue I Feel Wonderful, which was made up of material he had written at the university. It opened at the Theatre de Lys in Greenwich Village on October 18, 1954, and ran for 48 performances. It was his only show his mother saw; she died of cancer at the age of forty-four in December 1954. Herman said "I went into serious grieving."

In 1957, Herman approached the owner of a West Fourth Street jazz club called the Showplace and asked to put on a revue. As well as supplying the music, Herman wrote the book and directed the one-hour revue, called Nightcap. He asked his friend, Phyllis Newman, to do movement and dance and it featured Charles Nelson Reilly (who later co-starred in Hello, Dolly!). The show opened in May 1958 and ran for two years.

Herman next collected enough original material to put together an Off-Broadway revue called Parade in 1960. Herman directed with choreography by Richard Tone. The cast included Charles Nelson Reilly and Dody Goodman. It first opened at the Showplace and, expanded, moved to the Players Theatre in January 1960.

== Broadway career ==
In 1960, Herman made his Broadway debut with the revue From A to Z, which featured contributions from newcomers Woody Allen and Fred Ebb as well. That same year producer Gerard Oestreicher approached him after seeing a performance of "Parade", and asked if he would be interested in composing the score for a show about the founding of the state of Israel. The result was his first full-fledged Broadway musical, Milk and Honey in 1961. The show, about American tourists in Israel, starred Robert Weede, Mimi Benzell and Molly Picon. It received respectable reviews, was nominated for a Tony award, and ran for 543 performances.

Herman met playwright Tad Mosel in 1960 and they collaborated on an Off-Broadway musical adaptation of Mosel's 1953 television play, Madame Aphrodite. The musical of the same name, which starred Nancy Andrews in the title role, opened at the Orpheum Theatre in December 1961 but closed after 13 performances. The show has never been performed since. The failure of the musical hurt Herman, who felt that the direction and casting had not worked, but described his decision to make it as a "very brave thing for me to do...It was a dark piece, something more suited to early Sondheim than me".

=== Hello, Dolly! ===
In 1964, producer David Merrick united Herman with musical actress Carol Channing and librettist Michael Stewart for a project that was to become one of his more successful, Hello, Dolly!. The original production ran for 2,844 performances, the longest running musical for its time, and was later revived three times. Although facing stiff competition from Funny Girl, Hello, Dolly! swept the Tony Awards that season, winning 10, a record that remained unbroken for 37 years, until The Producers won 12 Tonys in 2001.

=== Mame ===
In 1966, Herman's next musical was the hit Mame starring Angela Lansbury, which introduced a string of Herman standards, most notably the ballad "If He Walked Into My Life", the holiday favorite "We Need a Little Christmas", and the title tune.

=== 1969–1980 ===
Although not commercial successes, Dear World (1969) starring Angela Lansbury, Mack & Mabel (1974) starring Robert Preston and Bernadette Peters, and The Grand Tour (1979) starring Joel Grey are noted for their interesting concepts and their melodic, memorable scores. Herman considers Mack & Mabel, also written in collaboration with Michael Stewart, his personal favorite score with later composition La Cage aux Folles in a close second. Both Dear World and Mack & Mabel have developed a cult following among Broadway aficionados.

=== La Cage aux Folles ===
In 1983, Herman had his third hit with La Cage aux Folles starring George Hearn and Gene Barry, a show that was notable for being one of the first hit Broadway musicals centered around a gay couple. The musical was tried out in Boston, where Herman worried:

A man singing a love song to another man--I don't think that's ever been done in a Broadway musical before. And, I mean, this was Boston, Katherine Cornell country. Frankly, I didn't know whether or not they'd throw stones. The audience gave it an ovation. That's when I started to think, 'We've done something right. They've bought the characters.' "

— Jerry Herman

Ticket sales were strong for its Boston tryout; a two-week extension required the box office to remain open for 36 hours straight to handle the demand. Advance sales for its Broadway debut at the Palace Theatre were described as "something approximating outright pandemonium." La Cage aux Folles won the Tony Award for Best Musical (1983), later became the first musical to win the Tony Award for Best Revival of a Musical twice (2005 and 2010).

=== Jerry's Girls ===
A revue of Herman's work ran on Broadway from December 1985 to April 1986: Jerry's Girls featured Dorothy Loudon, Leslie Uggams, and Chita Rivera.

== Songs ==
Many of Herman's show tunes have become pop standards. "Hello, Dolly!" was a No. 1 hit in the United States for Louis Armstrong, knocking The Beatles from No. 1 in 1964 after a 14-week run at the top ("I Want to Hold Your Hand", "She Loves You", and "Can't Buy Me Love."). A French recording by Petula Clark charted in the Top Ten in both Canada and France.

"If He Walked into My Life" from Mame was recorded by Eydie Gormé, winning her a Grammy Award for Best Vocal Performance, Female in 1967. "I Am What I Am" from La Cage aux Folles was recorded by Gloria Gaynor.

Other well known Herman showtunes include "Shalom" from Milk and Honey; "Before the Parade Passes By", "Put On Your Sunday Clothes", and "It Only Takes a Moment" from Hello, Dolly!; "It's Today!", "Open a New Window", "We Need a Little Christmas," and "Bosom Buddies" from Mame; and "Tap Your Troubles Away", "I Won't Send Roses" and "Time Heals Everything" from Mack & Mabel. His "I Am What I Am," written for La Cage aux Folles, became a gay pride anthem.

== Impact and recognition ==
According to The Washington Post, Herman's 1983 La Cage aux Folles, which centered on a gay couple whose son is about to marry the daughter of a conservative family, "arrived during the height of the AIDS epidemic and helped put gay life into the cultural mainstream at a time when many gay men were being stigmatized."

Herman is the only composer/lyricist to have had three original productions open on Broadway at the same time, from February to May 1969: Hello, Dolly!, Mame, and Dear World. He was the first (of two) composers/lyricists to have three musicals run more than 1500 consecutive performances on Broadway (the other being Stephen Schwartz): Hello, Dolly! (2,844 performances), Mame (1,508), and La Cage aux Folles (1,761). Herman is honored by a star on the Hollywood Walk of Fame, at the 7000 block of Hollywood Boulevard.

The Jerry Herman Ring Theatre, the campus theater at the University of Miami, his alma mater, is named in his honor. He was inducted into the Songwriters Hall of Fame in 1982.

Herman's work has been the subject of two popular musical revues, Jerry's Girls conceived by Larry Alford, and Showtune (2003) conceived by Paul Gilger.

A 90-minute documentary about his life and career, Words and Music by Jerry Herman, by filmmaker Amber Edwards, was screened in 2007 and then broadcast on PBS. In the 2008 animated film WALL-E, Herman's music from Hello, Dolly! is a theme for the character WALL-E.

In 1989, American-playwright Natalie Gaupp wrote a short play titled The Jerry Herman Center. The play is a comedy which portrays the lives of several patients in "The Jerry Herman Center for Musical Theatre Addiction." In 2012, Jason Graae and Faith Prince collaborated on The Prince and the Showboy, a show which pays tribute to Herman; Graae worked extensively with Herman and described him as "a survivor of the highest degree [who] lives his life as an eternal optimist."

In 2010, he received a Kennedy Center Honor. Introduced by Angela Lansbury, there were performances by Carol Channing, Matthew Morrison, Christine Baranski and Christine Ebersole, Laura Benanti, Sutton Foster, Matthew Bomer and Kelli O' Hara, 2002 Kennedy Center Honoree Chita Rivera, an unknown choir that included the Gay Mens Chorus of Washington, and Lansbury. Also honored were talk show host/actress Oprah Winfrey, dancer/choreographer Bill T. Jones, country singer-songwriter Merle Haggard, and singer-songwriter/musician Paul McCartney.

== Personal life and death ==
Having a flair for decorating in the 1970s, Herman took a break from composition after the failure of Mack and Mabel. Architectural Digest wrote about the firehouse he renovated and he also redecorated other houses and sold them. According to The Washington Post, Herman decorated three dozen homes. Herman reportedly listed his 4,088-square-foot (379.8 m^{2}) West Hollywood condominium apartment for sale early in 2013.

Herman was openly gay, and at the time of his death was partnered with Terry Marler, a real estate broker.

Herman was diagnosed HIV-positive in 1985. As noted in the Words and Music PBS documentary, "He is one of the fortunate ones who survived to see experimental drug therapies take hold and was still, as one of his lyrics proclaims, 'alive and well and thriving' over a quarter of a century later."

Herman's memoir, Showtune, was published in 1996.

He died at a hospital in Miami on December 26, 2019, at age 88.

== Work ==
=== Theater ===
Off-Broadway

- I Feel Wonderful (1954)
- Nightcap (1958)
- Parade (1960)
- Madame Aphrodite (1961)
- Showtune (2003)

Broadway musicals

- From A to Z (1960)
- Milk and Honey (1961)
- Hello, Dolly! (1964)
- Ben Franklin in Paris (additional music) (1964)
- Mame (1966)
- Dear World (1969)
- Mack & Mabel (1974)
- The Grand Tour (1979)
- A Day in Hollywood/A Night in the Ukraine (additional songs) (1980)
- La Cage aux Folles (1983)
- Jerry's Girls (1985)
- An Evening with Jerry Herman (1998)

Other stage

- Miss Spectacular (2003) recorded but unproduced

=== Films ===
Source: TCM

- Hello, Dolly! (1969)
- Mame (1974)
- Barney's Great Adventure (title song) (1998)
- WALL-E (excerpts of Hello, Dolly! featured)

=== Television ===
- Mrs. Santa Claus (1996)

== Awards and honors ==
- 2010 Kennedy Center Honoree
- 1999 Theatre World Special Award (An Evening with Jerry Herman)
- 1999 New York University Musical Theater Hall of Fame
- 1980 Doctor of Fine Arts, May 4, 1980, University of Miami

=== Grammy Awards ===
- 1966 Best Score From An Original Cast Show Album (Mame)
- 1964 Song of the Year (Hello, Dolly!)

=== Tony Awards ===
- 2009 Special Award for Lifetime Achievement in the Theatre
- 1984 Best Original Score (La Cage aux Folles)
- 1964 Best Composer and Lyricist (Hello, Dolly!)
