= Annelies Zoomers =

Dutch professor in International Development Studies

- Other name: E.B. Zoomers

Academic background
- Education: Centrum voor Studies en Documentatie van Latijns America, Amsterdam
- Thesis: Rural development and survival strategies in Central Paraguay (1998)

Annelies ('E.B.') Zoomers (born 3 May 1959, Amstelveen) is a Dutch professor in International Development Studies at the University of Utrecht.

== Early life and education ==
Annelies Zoomers spent her childhood in Amstelveen, Enschede, Naaldwijk and Utrecht. After obtaining her pre-university education diploma from Niels Stensen College in Utrecht, she studied human geography at Utrecht University, specializing in Human Geography of Developing Countries. She obtained her doctorate in 1984 (field research in Mexico and Mali). From 1984 to 1988 she was a PhD candidate in the Department of Human Geography of the Development Areas of the Radboud University in Nijmegen. For her dissertation, she spent 13 months in Paraguay between 1985 and 1988. She studied aspects of rural development in Central Paraguay and obtained her PhD in 1988 with Jan Kleinpenning for a thesis entitled 'Rural Development and Survival Strategies in Central Paraguay; the policy of agricultural colonization as an instrument to alleviate the situation of the rural poor'.

== Career ==
After her PhD, she worked for the Netherlands Economic Institute in Rotterdam and the Royal Tropical Institute in Amsterdam on projects for, among others, the Ministry of Foreign Affairs (Netherlands), the World Bank, the International Fund for Agricultural Development, and the International Labour Organization) in several countries in Latin America, Africa and Asia. Between 1995 and 2007 she was a researcher at the Center for the Study and Documentation of Latin America of the University of Amsterdam.

In 2005 she was appointed professor of Human Geography, in particular regional development policy and international migration, at Radboud University. She accepted her chair with the inaugural speech 'In search of El Dorado'. In 2007 she was appointed professor of International Development Studies at Utrecht University. She was the founding chair of the Netherlands Land Academy LANDac (2010-2019) and Shared Value Foundation (2015-2024); and served as the chair of WOTRO (Science for Global Development) between 2019 and 2022. In 2024, she was appointed as a member of the Advisory Council on International Affairs (AIV) and is chair of the Development Cooperation Committee (COS).

== Scientific work ==
In her dissertation, Zoomers examined the position of smallholders against the background of land reforms and agricultural colonization in Paraguay. Since then she has worked on the influence of international migration and capital flows on the livelihoods of local communities and disadvantaged groups in Africa, Asia and Latin America.

== Selected publications ==
- The Global Land Grab. Beyond the Hype, Zed Books, 3/6/2014 ISBN 978-1-78032-894-2. 288 pages (with Mayke Kaag)
- Current land policy in Latin America: regulating land tenure under neo-liberalism. KIT Publications & Iberoamericana/Vervuert Verlag, Amsterdam/Frankfurt/Madrid, 2000, 330 pp. (with G. van der Haar)
- Linking livelihood strategies to development: experiences from the Bolivian Andes. KIT-CEDLA. Amsterdam, 1999, 108 pp.
- Ros-Tonen, Mirjam; van den Hombergh, Heleen; Zoomers, Annelies, eds. (2006-12-01). Partnerships in Sustainable Forest Resource Management: Learning from Latin America. Boston: BRILL. ISBN 978-90-474-1076-8.
- Zoomers, Annelies (1998). Estrategias campesinas en el Surandino de Bolivia : Intervenciones y desarrollo rural en el norte de Chuquisaca y Potosí (in Spanish). La Paz: KIT/CEDLA/CID.
- Salman, Ton; Zoomers, E. B. (2002). Exodo Andino. Amsterdam: CEDLA. ISBN 978-90-70280-19-2.
- Salman, Ton; Zoomers, Annelies, eds. (2003). Imaging the Andes. Amstersam: Amsterdam University Press. ISBN 90-5260-093-7.
