= Annelies Knoppers =

American volleyball player and coach

Annelies Knoppers is a former college volleyball coach. She coached the Michigan State women's volleyball team for 11 seasons, compiling an overall record of 250-197-18. She was Michigan State's head coach when the Big Ten Conference began sponsoring women's volleyball.

== Coaching career ==
=== Michigan State ===
Knoppers was the third coach of the Michigan State women's volleyball team, and coached for the Spartans for eleven seasons.

Her head coaching career debuted in 1974, where the team opened with a tournament sponsored by the Michigan Women's Volleyball Association. In her second year of coaching, Michigan State qualified for the Association of Intercollegiate Athletics for Women (AIAW) championships, one of 24 teams to be invited to the tournament. The team finished with an overall record of 38-2, won the Big Ten tournament and the state tournament, and finished third in the Midwest Regionals. The team finished ninth in the AIAW championships. She returned eight of those players to compete the next year.

In the 1976 season, Knoppers' Spartans finished the season 35-6. They improved on their 1975 finish in the Midwest Regionals, this time securing a win. They were seeded eighth in the 24 team AIAW tournament.

Knoppers finished her career at Michigan State with a record of 250-197-18. She retired to pursue a teaching career.

== Head coaching record ==
Statistics overview
Season	Team	Overall	Conference	Standing	Postseason
Michigan State (Big Ten Conference) (1974–1984)
1974	Michigan State	20-13	—	—	
1975	Michigan State	41-4	—	—	
1976	Michigan State	41-9	—	—	
1977	Michigan State	7-34-2	—	—	
1978	Michigan State	22-15-8	—	—	
1979	Michigan State	28-18-8	—	—	
1980	Michigan State	32-17	—	—	
1981	Michigan State	17-32	2-6		
1982	Michigan State	9-22	2-11		
1983	Michigan State	17-17	3-10		
1984	Michigan State	16-16	5-8		
Michigan State:		250-197-18	12-35		
Total:		250-197-18			
National champion Postseason invitational champion Conference regular season champion Conference regular season and conference tournament champion Division regular season champion Division regular season and conference tournament champion Conference tournament champion
