= Annelies Nuy =

Dutch fashion designer (born 1960)

Annelies Nuy (born 15 December 1960) is a Dutch artist, designer and curator whose practice spans visual art, fashion, digital technology and immersive environments.

Her work explores the relationship between technological innovation, cultural memory and public access to art.

== Early work in Fashion & Technology ==
Nuy graduated from the Academy of Visual Arts in Arnhem in 1997. Her early career focused on the emerging relationship between fashion and digital technology.

In 1998, she established FashionFastForward, an early Dutch digital fashion platform connecting independent designers with a wider audience.

The initiative explored online distribution, direct communication between designers and consumers, made-to-order production and digital presentation formats. These approaches anticipated developments that would later become widespread in the fashion industry.

FashionFastForward operated until 2002, when Nuy continued her professional activities within the Dutch designers' association BNO.

== Artistic practice ==
Nuy's subsequent artistic practice expanded from fashion and digital communication into visual art, conceptual design and immersive exhibition environments.

Her projects investigate how technology can create alternative forms of access to cultural heritage and artworks beyond conventional museum spaces.

Her more recent initiatives include 100 Women in Art You Need to Know, an immersive exhibition project examining the representation of women in art history, and Beyond the Freeport, which explores the visibility of artworks held outside public view.

Through Conversation Pieces, she also connects physical objects with digital environments and art-historical information.

== Exhibitions ==
In 2023–2024, Nuy's work was included in Perfectly Imperfect — Flaws, Blemishes and Defects at Gewerbemuseum Winterthur, Switzerland.

olution Days in Paris and at the first Boudoir Show in Berlin, for which Nuy designed lingerie for Barbie.
