= Bram Bart =

Dutch voice actor (1962–2012)

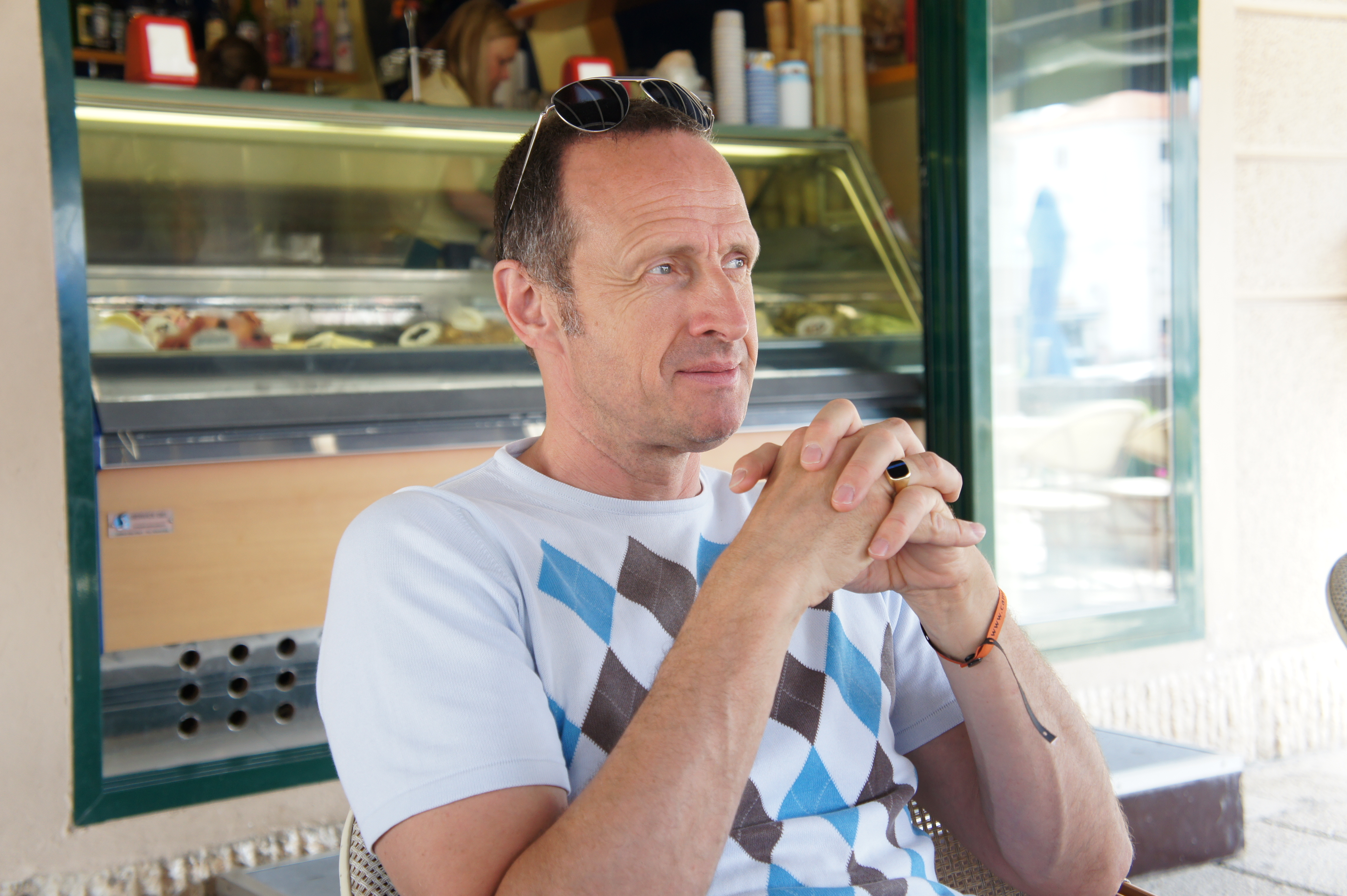
- Bram Bart in July 2011.
- Born: Abraham Johannes Aloysius Maria Bart; April 23, 1962 's-Hertogenbosch, Netherlands
- Died: April 8, 2012 (aged 49); University Hospital Leuven in Leuven, Belgium
- Occupation: Voice actor
- Website: www.brambart.nl

Abraham Johannes Aloysius Maria "Bram" Bart (April 23, 1962 – April 8, 2012) was a Dutch voice actor.

He dubbed voices in cartoons like Pokémon, Bob the Builder, and Ratz.

== Illness and death ==
Bram Bart died at the age of 49, in the University Hospital Leuven, Belgium. He was suffering from cancer.

== Voices ==
- Bob the Builder (Dutch: Bob de Bouwer) - Bob
- The Angry Beavers (Dutch: De Boze Bevers) - Daggett (Dutch: Boris)
- Ratz - Raphino
- Shin Chan - Mister Enzo, Grandpa
- Jetix - Dutch voice
- Pokémon - James, Gary Oak
- The Powerpuff Girls - Mojo Jojo
- Sesamstraat - Baby Bear

== Commercials ==
- DRK Kozijnen
- Park Bercenrode
- Lego City
- Smoeltjes
