= The Grand Tour (musical) =

- Original Logo
- Music: Jerry Herman
- Lyrics: Jerry Herman
- Book: Michael Stewart; Mark Bramble
- Basis: S. N. Behrman's play Jacobowsky and the Colonel
- Premiere: November 1978: Curran Theatre, San Francisco
- Productions: 1979 Broadway

The Grand Tour is a musical with a book by Michael Stewart and Mark Bramble and music and lyrics by Jerry Herman.

Based on S. N. Behrman's adaptation of the 1944 play Jakobowsky und der Oberst (Jacobowsky and the Colonel) by Franz Werfel, the story concerns an unlikely pair. S.L. Jacobowsky, a Polish-Jewish intellectual, has purchased a car he cannot drive. Stjerbinsky, an aristocratic, antisemitic colonel, knows how to drive but has no car. When the two men meet at a Paris hotel, they agree to join forces in order to escape the approaching Nazis. Together with the Colonel's girlfriend, Marianne, they experience many adventures while on the road, but trouble ensues when Jacobowsky falls in love with the young girl.

== Productions ==
The Grand Tour premiered in San Francisco for a tryout engagement in November–December, 1978. The San Francisco reviews "were of the 'good potential but needs work' " type. Joel Grey noted "There were big changes out there in terms of the shape of the show... In terms of material, there weren't that many. One of my songs was cut, and Jerry Herman wrote a new one for me and for Florence Lacey..." Also, Tommy Tune went to California to work on the show.

The musical premiered on Broadway at the Palace Theatre on January 11, 1979 and closed on March 4, 1979 after 61 performances and seventeen previews. Directed by Gerald Freedman and choreographed by Donald Saddler, the cast included Joel Grey, Ron Holgate, and Florence Lacey.

An original cast recording was released by Columbia Records.

== Analysis ==
Along with Milk and Honey, The Grand Tour is a largely forgotten piece in Jerry Herman's canon. It probably didn't help matters that it opened in the same season as Sweeney Todd, The Best Little Whorehouse in Texas, and They're Playing Our Song. It did, however, manage to get generally positive reviews from Time and The New York Post. Of Herman's three "flops" (Dear World, Mack and Mabel, and The Grand Tour), it had the shortest run on Broadway (Mack and Mabel outran it by five).

In an article for the New York Public Library, Diana Bertolini speculated: "The star performance, was by all accounts one of the most special anyone had ever seen. And Herman's score is terrific... This show didn't really have anything wrong with it! Good book, good score, good cast… all I can imagine is that it was in the wrong place at the wrong time....Herman said in interviews that he thought The Grand Tour had actually suffered from Grey's strong performance, because it turned Jacobowsky into the star part and The Colonel a supporting one, a change from Berman's play, in which the roles had been equal."

Ken Mandelbaum wrote that "Herman's least admired and performed flop score is nonetheless filled with nice things...'The Grand Tour' was moderately pleasant, and more enjoyable on disc."

In a review of a 2005 regional production at the Colony Theater in Burbank, California, Steve Oxman of Variety wrote: "it’s not really a mystery why this show doesn’t work, although it’s a bit baffling that anyone thought a minor adjustment would fix it. Herman... delivers a number of tunes here that linger pleasurably in the ear. But the tone of his work does battle with the story itself, in which clever Jewish refugee S.L. Jacobowsky... bombastic Polish Colonel Stjerbinsky... and his French girlfriend Marianne... try to stay one step ahead of the Nazis in occupied France.

== Synopsis ==
Act I

S. L. Jacobowsky relates that his incurable optimism has guided him well through a life of flight from one country to another in search of his place in the world ("I'll Be Here Tomorrow"). We are in Paris in the spring of 1940. The Germans are advancing rapidly, and Jacobowsky calmly waits outside a hotel for a man with a car for sale, by which he hopes to leave the capital. We meet two other hotel guests, a stiff-necked Polish aristocrat, Colonel Tadeusz Boleslav Stjerbinsky and his orderly, Szabuniewicz. The Colonel has a list of undercover agents in occupied Poland and is to meet a man with a flower in his lapel in the café of Papa Clairon in the French coastal village of St. Nazaire. The man will arrange passage for him to England so he can turn the papers over to the Polish government in exile. Jacobowsky buys the car but as he cannot drive and has overheard the Colonel's plans, proposes that he and the Colonel travel together. The Colonel will have no part of it, but Jacobowsky finally persuades him to do it for Poland ("For Poland"), and their Grand Tour begins.

In St. Cyrille the two meet Marianne, a lovely young French woman to whom the Colonel has promised to return. Mme Vauclain tries to persuade Marianne to leave St. Cyrille before the Germans come, but she will do nothing of the kind ("I Belong Here"). Late that night the car bearing Jacobowsky, the Colonel, and Szabuniewicz arrives outside Marianne's house, gives a final gasp, and expires. The Colonel wakens Marianne with music ("Marianne"), and although she is reluctant to leave St. Cyrille, Jacobowsky persuades Marianne that the best way to fight for her home is by leaving and remaining free. As she sews the Colonel's papers into her hat for safekeeping, they hurry to catch a local train heading west ("We're Almost There").

The train is halted by a bombed-out rail section and the group moves on to its next mode of transport, the caravan of the traveling Carnival Manzoni. Jacobowsky and Marianne talk, and we see that he is slowly falling in love with her. When the Carnival stops, Jacobowsky sets up a picnic at the side of the road and entertains Marianne while the Colonel glowers jealously in the background ("More and More / Less and Less"). The furious Colonel challenges Jacobowsky to a duel, and they are only stopped from shooting each other by the sudden arrival of an SS Captain. To save themselves, the four masquerade as performers in the Carnival: The Colonel and Szabuniewicz as two clowns, Jacobowsky as the human cannonball, and Marianne as his assistant ("One Extraordinary Thing"). Jacobowsky is about to climb into the cannon when the Colonel inadvertently gives the game away and they are forced to fire the cannon and make their escape under cover of its smoke and confusion.

They meet several hours later. Jacobowsky has arranged for a truck hauling nets to take them to the coast, but he will not go. It is time for him to head south to Spain and safety. But in his rush the Colonel has left the papers behind. Moments too late, Jacobowsky finds the papers and inspired by duty and the thought of seeing Marianne once more, he starts off to find her and the Colonel in St. Nazaire.

Act II

Jacobowsky, on his way to St. Nazaire aboard a small barge, reflects on the one person who has never been a part of his life ("Mrs. S. L. Jacobowsky"). When he arrives at Papa Clairon's café, his friends have not yet shown up. But a wedding is about to take place, and he momentarily mistakes the boutonniered bride's father for the underground contact with the flower in his lapel. The guests are overjoyed to learn that Jacobowsky's father taught biblical history and that he can perform the wedding ("Wedding Conversation / Mazeltov"). As the ceremony is concluded, the guests barely have time to scramble to safety as the Nazis enter. A man who remains behind is revealed to the Nazis as a Gestapo agent, but in fact, he is the Colonel's contact. Realizing that the café is no longer safe, he sends a waitress to intercept the Colonel and tell him the meeting place has been changed to 23 Rue Mace, to the relief of Jacobowsky.

En route to the café and now very much aware of the missing papers, Marianne, the Colonel, and Szabuniewicz agonize over their loss. The Colonel realizes how much like Jacobowsky he is — running, hunted, and in fear of his life ("I Think, I Think"). Arriving on a bicycle the waitress tells them of the new meeting place.

At 23 Rue Mace, the convent of the Sisters of Charity, the Germans have come to billet their troops in spite of Mother Madeleine's outrage. The foursome arrive for their meeting and over-power the Germans. The Colonel is forced to kill the SS Captain, and Jacobowsky throws the other soldiers into the coal cellar and gives the Colonel the secret papers. By now the last barriers are down between the two men, and we see that Jacobowsky and the Colonel are friends at last ("You I Like").

Later that night on the wharf outside St. Nazaire they wait for the boat that will take them to England, but there will be room only for two of the four. Szabuniewicz will not go but will return to Poland and fight the Nazis there. Jacobowsky, though he knows that there is no place for him in France, insists that Marianne leave with the Colonel. Jacobowsky's flight will continue, but this time with a difference; if he has found a place in the heart of a Marianne, then what can stop him from finding his place in the world? His Grand Tour is just beginning ("I'll Be Here Tomorrow (Reprise)").

== Songs ==
Act I

- I'll Be Here Tomorrow - S. L. Jacobowsky
- For Poland - Colonel Tadeusz Boleslav Stjerbinsky, Mme. Bouffier and Parisians
- I Belong Here - Marianne
- Marianne - Colonel Tadeusz Boleslav Stjerbinsky
- We're Almost There - Marianne, Szabuniewicz, S. L. Jacobowsky, Colonel Tadeusz Boleslav Stjerbinsky, Mme. Marville, Conductor and Passengers
- Marianne (Reprise) - S. L. Jacobowsky
- More and More/ Less and Less - Marianne and Colonel Tadeusz Boleslav Stjerbinsky
- One Extraordinary Thing - S. L. Jacobowsky, Marianne, Colonel Tadeusz Boleslav Stjerbinsky, Szabuniewicz and Carnival Performers
- One Extraordinary Thing (Reprise) - S. L. Jacobowsky

Act II

- Mrs. S.L. Jacobowsky - S. L. Jacobowsky
- Wedding Conversation - S. L. Jacobowsky and Bride's Father
- Mazeltov - Bride's Father and Wedding Guests
- I Think, I Think - Colonel Tadeusz Boleslav Stjerbinsky
- For Poland (Reprise) - Marianne, Mother Madeleine and Sisters of Charity
- You I Like - Colonel Tadeusz Boleslav Stjerbinsky and S. L. Jacobowsky
- I Belong Here (Reprise) - Marianne
- I'll Be Here Tomorrow (Reprise) - S. L. Jacobowsky

== Cast ==
	Original Broadway (1979)	Off-Broadway Revival (1988)	Musicals in Mufti (2009)
S. L. Jacobowsky	Joel Grey	Stuart Zagnit	Jason Graae
Colonel Tadeusz Boleslav Stjerbinsky	Ron Holgate	Paul Ukena, Jr.	James Barbour
Marianne	Florence Lacey	Patricia Ben Peterson	Nancy Anderson
Mme. Vauclain/Mme. Manzoni/Bride's Aunt	Chevi Colton	Patti Mariano	
Captain Meuller	George Reinholt	Don Atkinson	
Claudine	Jo Speros	Jeanne Montano	
Szabuniewicz	Stephen Vinovich	Steven Fickinger	

== Awards and nominations ==
Source: Playbill

- 1979 Nominee - Tony Award for Best Original Score
- 1979 Nominee - Tony Award for Best Leading Actor in a Musical (Grey)
- 1979 Nominee - Tony Award for Best Featured Actor in a Musical (Holgate)
- 1979 Nominee - Drama Desk Award for Outstanding Actor in a Musical (Grey)
