= The Diary of Anne Frank (radio play) =

Anne Frank: The Diary of a Young Girl is an original radio play by author Meyer Levin (1905–1981). It was adapted from Levin's original stage dramatization of the same name, adapted from The Diary of a Young Girl, Anne Frank's 1942-1944 diary that was posthumously published in 1947. It aired on CBS on September 18, 1952, the eve of Rosh Hashanah, to critical acclaim, and again in November 1952.

== Meyer Levin ==
Author Meyer Levin was born in 1905 to Jewish immigrants in Chicago. He began a journalism career at the age of 16 when he started reporting for the Chicago Daily News. In 1943 Levin was based in London as a war correspondent. He followed the stories of American Jewish soldiers and Germany's genocidal campaign. Levin was one of the first American journalists to enter a work camp, Ohrdruf, then Bergen-Belsen, Dachau, and more. He suffered tremendous guilt as witness to the atrocities and wrote of his inability to tell the story of the Jews of Europe. That changed when he encountered The Diary of Anne Frank, the first personal diary to emerge from the war. Levin wrote to Otto Frank and met with him before leaving Europe, inquiring into the American publication and dramatic rights. He was the first to see the dramatic potential of the Diary.

== The reappearance ==
Producer Jennifer Strome discovered the radio play script in 1999 while researching Levin's life story. She met a member of Levin's family and was captivated by Levin's history with the Diary of Anne Frank stage play. She contacted Levin's son Mikael Levin who introduced her to his mother, French author Tereska Torrès, and to Levin's vast collection of books and films.

With permission from Torres, Strome began her research in earnest at the Howard Gotleib Archival Research Center of rare book and manuscript collections at Boston University. More than 50 boxes of personal letters, trial transcripts, and articles belonging to Meyer Levin were made available. It was there that she came across Levin's original, annotated script for the Radio Play, a document Levin's family had never seen. It is a historical piece of literature that had fallen into obscurity after what appeared as a controversy between Levin and Otto Frank.

Strome's effort to restore Levin's radio play as part of Anne Frank's legacy of dramatic adaptations resulted in a North American Educational Initiative, annefrankunites.org, as a contribution to the fight against intolerance. Strome was authorized by the Anne Frank Fonds, Basel Switzerland (AnneFrank.ch) to provide the materials with Limited Use July 15, 2013 – 2015.

== 2009 live performance ==
On September 14, 2009, Strome produced a private, live performance of Levin's radio play at the Museum of Jewish Heritage—A Living Memorial to the Holocaust in NYC. It was the first time the play was heard since its original air date in 1952. This performance marks the first time that the Anne Frank Fonds in Basel, Switzerland, acknowledged Meyer Levin's work on the diary. The Museum performance was followed by a panel discussion moderated by Neil Baldwin, PhD and featuring author Cynthia Ozick and Strome.

Actors

Jonathan Hogan (Otto Frank)

Sara Kapner (Anne Frank)

Lori Wilner (Mrs. Frank)

Jessica Dean (Margot)

Mary Rasmussen (Miep/Lies)

Stuart Zagnit (Mr. Van Daan)

Cberyl Stern (Mrs. Van Daan)

Macleod Andrews (Peter Van Daan)

Andy Prosky (Announcer/Koophius/Dussel)

Production

composer/musical director: Bob Magnuson

== 2012 podcast ==
On September 15, 2012, Strome produced and directed a free On Demand podcast of the radio play to commemorate the 60th anniversary of its original and only CBS broadcast in 1952.

Actors

Bruce Nozick (announcer, Mr. Van Daan, Albert Dussel)

Tara Platt (Miep, Margot)

Rick Zieff (Otto Frank)

Tasia Valenza (Mrs. Frank)

Justine Huxley (Anne)

Katie Zieff (Lies)

Tracy Pattin (Mrs. Van Daan)

Yuri Lowenthal (Peter Van Daan, Koophuis)

Production

Composer/Musician: Bob Magnuson

Technical director/audio engineer: Mark Holden
