= Parade (revue) =

- Original Cast Album
- Music: Jerry Herman
- Lyrics: Jerry Herman
- Book: Jerry Herman
- Productions: 1960 Off-Broadway

Parade is a musical revue with book, music, and lyrics by Jerry Herman.

The original production was produced by Lawrence Kasha that opened originally at the Showplace in New York and moved off-Broadway to The Players Theatre on January 20, 1960.

== Productions ==
=== Original Production ===
In addition to writing the book, music and lyrics, Jerry Herman directed the show with choreography and staging by Richard Tone. The costumes were by Nilo and the production was designed by Gary Smith. The cast included Dody Goodman, Richard Tone, Fia Karin, Charles Nelson Reilly, and Lester James. Some of the songs from Parade were later used by Herman in Mame and Mack and Mabel. For example, Herman used the song "Show Tune" with a new lyric and stronger B section, as "It's Today" in Mame.

== Original Cast ==
- Dody Goodman
- Richard Tone
- Fia Karin
- Charles Nelson Reilly
- Lester James

== Musical numbers ==
The songs and sketches reflected some topical and local subjects, such as Goodman and Reilly portraying New York Governor Nelson Rockefeller and his wife, explaining why he decided not to run for president in the 1960 election. "Jolly Theatrical Season" made fun of overly serious plays. In "Save the Village" Goodman poked fun at people who wanted to save Greenwich Village. William Ruhlman wrote that the romantic ballads – "Your Hand in Mine," "The Next Time I Love," "Another Candle" – "might have had a chance to live beyond the show if it had been more successful."

- "Show Tune" - The Company
- "Your Hand in Mind" - Lester James and Fia Karin
- "Maria in Spats" - Dody Goodman
- "Confession to a Park Avenue Mother" - Charles Nelson Reilly
- "Save the Village" - Dody Goodman
- "Jolly Theatrical Season" - Dody Goodman and Charles Nelson Reilly
- "Two a Day" - Richard Tone
- "Just Plain Folks" - Dody Goodman and Charles Nelson Reilly
- "The Antique Man" - Lester James
- "The Next Time I Love" - Fia Karin
- "Your Good Morning" - Lester James and Fia Karin
- "Another Candle" - Fia Karin
- Finale: "Parade" - Company

=== Recording ===
An original cast recording was released by Decca Records.

== Reception ==
The show failed to make much of an impression. According to Steven Suskin, " 'Parade'...didn't cause much of a stir over the course of its 95-performance run." Dan Dietz noted that Brooks Atkinson "was somewhat cool to Jerry Herman's contributions...", Atkinson writing that the revue was more "in the style of 'Little Broadway' than 'Off-Broadway'." Dan Dietz wrote that the song "Maria in Spats", about the opera diva Maria Callas, sung by Dody Goodman was "memorable." Stephen Citron observed that "what these songs lack in craft is made up for in élan....The show end [s] with what would become a Herman trademark, a reprise of most of the revue's twelve songs.... In spite of the Times pan, Parade was Herman's steppingstone to Broadway."
