= Milk and Honey (musical) =

- Original Broadway Cast Album
- Music: Jerry Herman
- Lyrics: Jerry Herman
- Book: Don Appell
- Productions: 1961 Broadway; 1994 Off-Broadway

Milk and Honey is a musical with a book by Don Appell and music and lyrics by Jerry Herman. The story centers on a busload of lonely American widows hoping to catch husbands while touring Israel and is set against the backdrop of the country's struggle for recognition as an independent nation. It was Herman's first Broadway book musical following a succession of off-Broadway revues.

== Background ==
Herman was playing the piano for Parade, his most recent revue following I Feel Wonderful and Nitecap, when he was approached by theatre producer Gerard Oestreicher, who was seeking a composer for a project about Israel he hoped to mount on Broadway. He sent Herman and Appell there to absorb the culture and hopefully find inspiration. Herman was determined that the musical not be a patriotic love letter. Herman said: “We were there to soak up the atmosphere...Once we saw this group of little old lady tourists rummaging about, we knew that they had to be in our show.” Herman explained that "Everything about this place is not perfect. I had already written the song called "Milk and Honey" as a kind of an anthem, and I said, ... 'I have to have another point of view.' And I wrote the counterpoint after I wrote the first song — "the honey's kind of bitter and the milk's a little sour..." That made it real for me."

Directed by Albert Marre, choreographed by Donald Saddler and orchestrated by Hershy Kay and Eddie Sauter, Milk and Honey began its pre-Broadway tryout run at New Haven, Connecticut's Shubert Theatre on August 28, 1961. The critical reception was positive, but Herman felt third lead Molly Picon, who clearly was an audience favorite, needed another song and composed "Chin Up, Ladies" for her. The company moved on to the Colonial Theatre in Boston, playing there from September 5–23.

After one preview, Milk and Honey opened on Broadway on October 10, 1961 in the Martin Beck Theatre and ran for 543 performances. In addition to Picon, the show featured Metropolitan Opera stars Mimi Benzell and Robert Weede, and dancer-singer Tommy Rall. Hermione Gingold replaced Picon later in the run. The musical director was Max Goberman. New York Times theater critic Howard Taubman praised the musical for its "heartwarming integrity" and for "taste and imagination," and lauded its performances, especially Picon's.

== Synopsis ==
=== Act 1 ===
The calm of a morning street scene in modern Jerusalem is shattered when a police officer orders a Yemenite boy to remove his flock of sheep to a side street. Phil Arkin, an American visiting his married daughter, defends the boy, and in the ensuing fracas he meets Ruth Stein, a tourist travelling with a group of widows from the United States. She is impressed with Phil's command of Hebrew as he explains the meaning of the word "Shalom".

They keep running into each other and together they celebrate Israel's Independence Day ("Independence Day Hora"). Their friendship begins to deepen and Phil's conscience starts troubling him. Although he has been separated from his wife for many years, he does not think it right to continue seeing Ruth since he is still married. Phil's daughter, Barbara, however, likes Ruth and invites her to go with them to her farm in the Negev. After some hesitation, Ruth accepts.

On the farm - called a Moshav - Phil tries to talk Barbara and her husband David into going back to Baltimore with him. But the young man vows his devotion to his country and is joined in its praise by his neighbors, including his cynical friend Adi, who claims he would rather live in the city ("Milk and Honey").

Phil, who is falling in love with Ruth, asks her to stay at Barbara's a little longer. In fact, he is even thinking of building a house of his own there that he would like her to share ("There's No Reason in the World").

Meanwhile, the group of touring widows comes to visit. When they eye the virile young farmers, the ladies, led by Clara Weiss, reveal their hopes of finding suitable husbands. Though their dreams are quickly dashed when all the men turn out to be married, Clara is still optimistic ("Chin Up, Ladies").

Later, Phil tells Ruth that he has bought a lot on which to build a home, and she gives him her approval ("That Was Yesterday"). But Barbara is shocked at the news, and urges her father to tell Ruth that he is married. Reluctantly he does, but he also tells her why she must remain ("Let's Not Waste a Moment"). At a wedding ceremony that they attend, Phil and Ruth, envious of the younger people, express their deep love for each other and, forgetting the consequences for the moment, go off together ("The Wedding").

=== Act 2 ===
Phil energetically feels the spirit of the new land and goes out to work the fields with the other farmers ("Like A Young Man"). Barbara, however, brings news that Ruth, realizing the consequences of living with a married man, has run off to Tel Aviv, and Phil goes off to bring her back. When they are alone, David, convinced that Barbara really longs to go back to the United States, asserts that he would go anywhere to be with her ("I Will Follow You").

In Tel Aviv, Phil finds Clara at the Cafe Hotok, but she refuses to tell him where Ruth is. When he leaves, Clara accidentally meets Sol Horowitz, a widower from Jerusalem, and they promptly show mutual interest. Alone, she seeks her late husband's permission to remarry if Sol proposes ("Hymn to Hymie").

Back at the moshav, Phil, after much inner conflict, realizes that it would be wrong to live with Ruth. Although she comes back to him, he tells her that she must leave ("As Simple as That").

At Lydda Airport, the touring widows are preparing to board the plane home. Phil and Ruth have their final, brief moment together during which he promises to fly to Paris, where his wife lives, and plead for a divorce. Ruth boards the plane with the hope that somehow Phil will succeed and she will be able to come back to him ("Finale").

== Original cast and characters ==
Character	Broadway (1961)
Phil Arkin	Robert Weede
Ruth Stein	Mimi Benzell
Clara Weiss	Molly Picon
Barbara	Lanna Saunders
David	Tommy Rall
Adi	Juki Arkin
Zipporah	Ellen Madison
Mrs. Perlman	Thelma Pelish
Mrs. Segal	Diane Goldberg
Mr. Horowitz	Rueben Singer
Mrs. Weinstein	Addi Negri
Mrs. Breslin	Rose Lischner
Mrs. Kessler	Ceil Delli
Mr. Strauss	Dorothy Richardson
The Guide	Ellen Berse
Shepherd Boy	Johnny Borden

== Songs ==
Act I

- Shepherd's Song - Shepherd Boy and Phil
- Shalom - Phil and Ruth
- Independence Day Hora - The Company
- Milk and Honey - David, Adi, and Company
- There's No Reason in the World - Phil
- Chin Up, Ladies - Mrs. Weiss and Widows
- That Was Yesterday - Ruth, Phil, Adi, and Company
- Let's Not Waste a Moment - Phil
- The Wedding - Ruth, Phil, and Company

Act II

- Like A Young Man - Phil
- I Will Follow You - David
- Hymn to Hymie - Clara
- There's No Reason in the World (Reprise) - Ruth
- Milk and Honey (Reprise) - Adi and Company
- As Simple as That - Ruth and Phil
- Shalom (Reprise) - Ruth, Phil, and Company

An original cast recording was released by RCA Victor. DRG re-issued this recording in 2008.

=== Recordings ===
In 1962, American singer Eddie Fisher recorded a pop rendition of the musical’s title song, “Milk and Honey.” Although it did not chart on the Billboard Hot 100, it reached No. 104 on Cashbox, and saw regional success in Canada, where it peaked at #6 in Vancouver and #2 in Toronto. Fisher's version presented a traditional pop interpretation of Jerry Herman’s composition and marked one of the few instances where a Broadway song from the show was adapted into a contemporary recording by a major pop artist of the time. Eddie Fisher also recorded the song “Shalom” from Milk and Honey as the B-side to his 1962 single “Milk and Honey.” Arranged by Sid Feller and conducted by Peter DeAngelis, Fisher’s version offered a lush pop interpretation of the musical number. While it did not chart on the Billboard Hot 100, “Shalom” reached No. 105 on Music Vendor and No. 107 on Cashbox, and received regional airplay in North America.

== Production history ==
The original Broadway production ran for 543 performances, from October 10, 1961 to January 26, 1963, at the Martin Beck Theatre.

The musical was revived in 1994 at the off-Broadway American Jewish Theatre, where it ran for 59 performances. The cast included Chevi Colton, Katy Selverstone, Ron Holgate (who had a small role in the original production), Avi Hoffman and James Barbour. In his review in The New York Times, David Richards wrote, "Jerry Herman's score is the best reason for reviving Milk and Honey... Ranging from ballads... to marches... to waltzes, the songs have none of the show-business slickness that sometimes crops up in his subsequent musicals.... When all else fails... there is always Mr. Herman's score to soar to the rescue. I wouldn't want to dismiss Hello, Dolly! or Mame. But is it possible that his very best work came first?"

In 2011 the musical opened the Magnormos 'A Jerry Herman Triptych' at Melbourne Recital Centre, which was followed by two other Herman works Dear World and Hello, Dolly!

== Awards and nominations ==
=== Original Broadway production ===
Year	Award	Category	Nominee	Result
1962	Tony Award	Best Musical		Nominated
1962	Tony Award	Best Original Score	Jerry Herman	Nominated
1962	Tony Award	Best Performance by a Leading Actress in a Musical	Molly Picon	Nominated
1962	Tony Award	Best Costume Design	Miles White	Nominated
1962	Tony Award	Best Producer of a Musical	Gerard Oestriecher	Nominated

== Reference and notes ==
- Showtune by Jerry Herman and Marilyn Stasio, published by Donald I. Fine Books (1996), pages 37–55 ISBN 1-55611-502-4
