= Marilyn Maye discography =

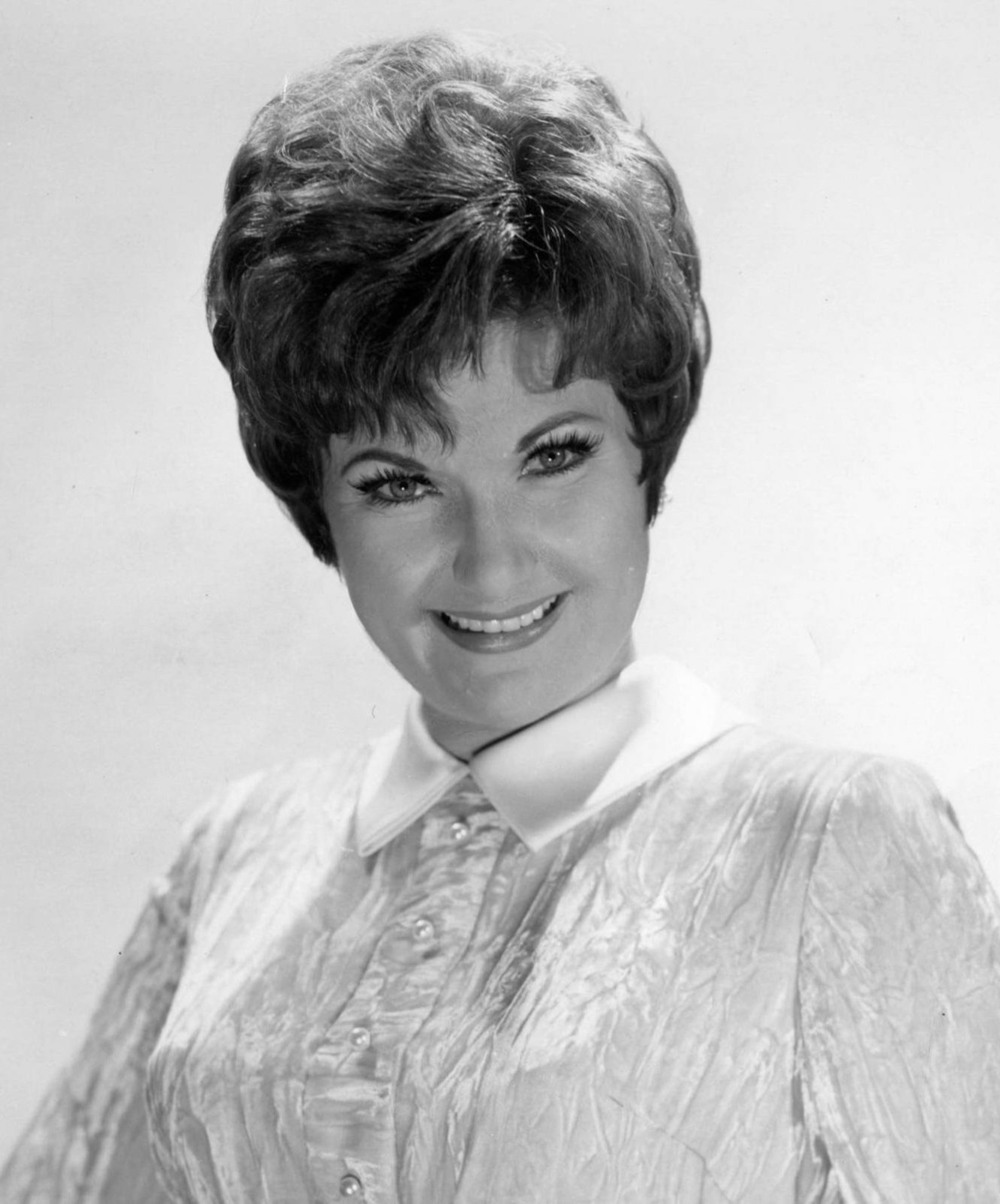
- Marilyn Maye promotional photo, 1960s.
- Studio albums: 13
- Live albums: 2
- Compilation albums: 2
- Lead artist singles: 13
- Promotional singles: 2
- Other album appearances: 4

The discography of American singer Marilyn Maye contains 13 studio albums, two compilation albums, two live albums, 13 lead artist singles, two promotional singles and four additional album appearances. Her debut studio album appeared in 1961 called Marilyn...the Most. Signing with RCA Victor, her second studio album was released in 1965 titled Meet Marvelous Marilyn Maye. It was followed in 1966 by the live album, The Second of Maye, and a studio album, The Lamp Is Low.

In February 1967, her fourth studio album A Taste of "Sherry!" spawned four singles. Two of its singles reached the top ten of the American Billboard adult contemporary chart: the title track "Cabaret". It was followed by the top 25 adult contemporary single "When We All Get Together". In November 1967, Step to the Rear was released. Its title track was Maye's most commercially successful single, reaching number two on the Billboard adult contemporary chart.

In September 1968, her seventh studio album The Happiest Sound in Town was released. It included the promotional single "Sing Me a Tune". Her eighth studio album followed in April 1970 titled Marilyn Maye, Girl Singer. Its lead single "Feelin'" reached number 14 on the Billboard adult contemporary chart and number 26 on Canada's RPM adult contemporary chart. In 1969, she collaborated with Ed Ames on the single "Think Summer", reach reached the top 20 of the Billboard adult contemporary chart. It was re-released in 1970 and reached the top 40 on the same chart.

Through her own record company, Marilyn Maye Records, she continued recording and releasing studio albums. This began with 1985's Marilyn Maye Sings All of Jerry Herman's "Hello Dolly". She collaborated with Mark Frank on the 2000 album Rapport: Marilyn Maye and Mark Frank Communicate. In 2005, she paid tribute to Johnny Carson with Super Singer – A Tribute to Johnny Carson. A 2016 live album with the Dukes of Dixieland was released in 2016.

== Albums ==
=== Studio albums ===
List of studio albums, showing all relevant details
| Title | Album details |
|---|---|
| Marilyn...the Most | Released: 1961; Label: Holly; Formats: LP |
| Meet Marvelous Marilyn Maye | Released: August 1965; Label: RCA Victor; Formats: LP |
| The Lamp Is Low | Released: October 1966; Label: RCA Victor; Formats: LP |
| A Taste of "Sherry!" | Released: February 1967; Label: RCA Victor; Formats: LP |
| Step to the Rear | Released: November 1967; Label: RCA Victor; Formats: LP |
| The Happiest Sound in Town | Released: September 1968; Label: RCA Victor; Formats: LP |
| Marilyn Maye, Girl Singer | Released: April 1970; Label: RCA Victor; Formats: LP |
| Marilyn Maye Sings All of Jerry Herman's "Hello Dolly" | Released: 1985; Label: Marilyn Maye; Formats: LP |
| Rapport: Marilyn Maye and Mark Franklin Communicate (with Mark Franklin) | Released: 2000; Label: Marilyn Maye; Formats: CD |
| Super Singer – A Tribute to Johnny Carson | Released: 2005; Label: Marilyn Maye; Formats: CD |
| Maye Sings Ray | Released: 2005; Label: Marilyn Maye; Formats: CD |
Studio albums unknown release dates
| The Presence of Marilyn Maye | Released: Unknown; Label: Soundtrek Studios; Formats: Cassette |
| The Singing Side of Life | Released: Unknown; Label: Self-released; Formats: CD |

=== Live albums ===
List of live albums, showing all relevant details
| Title | Album details |
|---|---|
| The Second of Maye | Released: April 1966; Label: RCA Victor; Formats: LP |
| Super Singer – Live in New Orleans (with the Dukes of Dixieland) | Released: January 14, 2016; Label: Leisure; Formats: Digital |

=== Compilation albums ===
List of compilation albums, showing all relevant details
| Title | Album details |
|---|---|
| Meet Marvelous Marilyn Maye/ The Lamp Is Low | Released: 2001; Label: BMG/Collectables; Formats: CD |
| Sounds of Maye | Released: 2011; Label: Marilyn Maye; Formats: CD |

== Singles ==
=== As lead artist ===
List of singles, with selected chart positions, showing other relevant details
| Title | Year | Peak chart positions | | Album |
| Title | Year | US AC | CAN AC | Album |
|---|---|---|---|---|
| "Long Ago" | 1965 | — | — | A Taste of "Sherry"! |
| "I've Learned the Way to Sing the Blues" | 1966 | — | — | A Taste of "Sherry"! |
| "Cabaret" | 1966 | 9 | — | A Taste of "Sherry"! |
| "Sherry!" | 1967 | 8 | — | A Taste of "Sherry"! |
| "When We All Get Together" | 1967 | 25 | — | —N/a |
| "Step to the Rear" | 1967 | 2 | — | Step to the Rear |
| "Till You Come Back" | 1968 | 35 | — | —N/a |
| "Montage from How Sweet It Is" | 1968 | — | — | —N/a |
| "Feelin'" | 1968 | 14 | 26 | Marilyn Maye, Girl Singer |
| "I'll Never Fall in Love Again" | 1969 | — | — | Marilyn Maye, Girl Singer |
| "Think Summer" (with Ed Ames) | 1969 | 17 | — | —N/a |
| "Jimmy" | 1969 | — | — | —N/a |
| "Applause" | 1970 | — | — | —N/a |
| "Think Summer" (with Ed Ames) | 1970 | 38 | — | —N/a |
"—" denotes a recording that did not chart or was not released in that territory.

=== Promotional singles ===
List of promotional singles, showing all relevant details
| Title | Year | Album | Ref. |
|---|---|---|---|
| "Sing Me a Tune" | 1969 | The Happiest Sound in Town | |
| "The Chiefs Are on the Warpath" | 1970 | —N/a | |

== Other album appearances ==
List of non-single guest appearances, with other performing artists, showing year released and album name
| Title | Year | Other artist(s) | Album | Ref. |
|---|---|---|---|---|
| "Goodbye" | 1958 | Sammy Tucker Trio | Cool Sounds from Kansas City | |
| "I'd Like to Recognize the Tune" | 1958 | Sammy Tucker Trio | Cool Sounds from Kansas City | |
| "Looking at You" | 1958 | Sammy Tucker Trio | Cool Sounds from Kansas City | |
| "Christmas Is..." | 1969 | Air Force Dance Orchestra | The United States Air Force Presents Christmas Programs | |
