= Carolina Band =

Marching band of the University of South Carolina

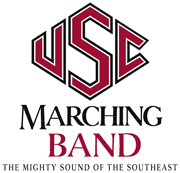
- School: University of South Carolina
- Location: Columbia, South Carolina, United States
- Conference: Southeastern Conference
- Founded: 1920
- Director: Dr. Jay Jacobs
- Associate Director: Dr. Ben Pouncey
- Members: 375 (2024)
- Fight song: "The Fighting Gamecocks Lead the Way"
- Website: www.carolinaband.org

The Carolina Band, or the Mighty Sound of the Southeast, is the official marching band of the University of South Carolina. With an average membership of 360, it is the largest ensemble associated with the university's School of Music. The marching band performs at all South Carolina Gamecocks football home games played at Williams-Brice Stadium, as well as neutral site games, bowl games, and all games against Clemson, where both the Carolina Band and Clemson's Tiger Band both perform at half time regardless of which school is hosting on a given year.

The band sends smaller pep bands to go to regular season away games where the full band is not required. The Carolina Band has also performed in exhibition at local high school marching band competitions and at SCBDA State Championships. In 2024, the Carolina Band performed at the Macy's Thanksgiving Day Parade.

== Membership ==
Most members of the Carolina Band major in something other than music, as membership is open to all USC students as well as those participating in the Bridge Program at Midlands Technical College. The band offers all members a $500 scholarship and offers an additional tuition reduction to out of state members.

The Carolina Band is made up of various components, including brass and woodwinds, drumline, color guard, coquettes, and feature twirlers. Though all members of the band audition, auditions for drumline, guard, coquettes, and twirlers are more competitive.

=== Musicians ===
Brass and woodwind instruments make up the majority of the Carolina Band. The Carolina Band fields piccolos, clarinets, alto and tenor saxes, trumpets, mellophones, trombones, baritones, and sousaphones.

The Carolina Band Drumline (CBDL) performs with the marching band as well as on their own in the spring. The drumline consists of snares, tenors, basses and cymbals. In 2022, the drumline added a multis section to prepare drummers to play snare and tenors.

=== Auxiliaries ===
The Carolina Color Guard is a major visual component of the band. In addition to flags, guard is seen spinning rifles and sabres and performing choreography.

The Carolina Coquettes is the main dance component of the band. They utilize pom poms and are often seen performing with the entire band and with the drumline.

The Carolina Band Feature Twirlers twirl batons and are heavily featured by the band, and have a history of winning regional, state, national, and world titles.

== History ==
The Carolina Band began as a student-initiated organization in 1920, when the request to organize a band was granted by the board of trustees. The first band was formed with fewer than 20 students in September 1921 under the direction of a student (Mr. Martin).

- 1922: After the departure of Martin, James C. Lanham, another student at USC, assumed the director position through the 1922–23 school year.
- 1923: George Olson was appointed director of the band, Olson was the first faculty member in charge of the band (was Dean of the School of Commerce). With 23 years, Olson was the longest serving director of the marching band itself. (Copenhaver is the longest serving overall director of bands; however he only directly oversaw the marching band for 21 years).

=== The World War II years (to 1945) ===
Still under the direction of Olson, the band began to increasingly take on the appearance and the sound of a marching band. Olson's band were of the first to wear uniforms in the school colors and he offered participating students instruments for use in the band. Band membership totaled around 50 members.

Additionally, as the United States was engaged in the second world war, many members were lost from the university and the band to active duty requirements for World War II. In 1941, the formerly all-male band changed its policies to allow women into its membership. The first female members only served as majorettes. Later, female members assumed positions as marching members of the band.

=== After World War II & the 1950s ===
After World War II, the band began to develop more as a "show" band, with more elaborate pre-game and halftime shows. There were four different directors between 1946 and 1959.

- 1946: Louis Albert Fink continued the V-12 Naval ROTC band style which was used by Olson in the latter part of his term. Additionally, the band began to travel to football games away from Columbia.
- 1950: Richard H. Zimmermann served as director through 1955. Membership reached a peak of 82 members.
- 1955: Donald L. Banschbach succeeded Zimmermann during the first time that Air Force ROTC, Navy ROTC and University bands all operating independently of each other.
- 1956: Pat Garnett is known most widely for eliminating the majorettes from the band. He suffered a stroke in 1958 and ended his term as director in 1959.

=== 1960s and 1970s ===
The style of the Carolina Band can be traced to the appointment of James D. Pritchard as band director in 1959. Though a regimental marching band, Pritchard brought back the majorettes and feature twirlers, who had been absent from the shows of the preceding few years. Pritchard also acquired a recording studio, more storage & practice areas and created the "Coquettes", the official dance team of the marching band.

Pritchard obtained a band arrangement of the song Step to the Rear from the Broadway musical How Now, Dow Jones in 1968 and the marching band played the song at the first game of the 1968 season. It caught the ear of Coach Paul Dietzel who contacted Pritchard about making it the official fight song of the university to replace the original fight song, Carolina Let Your Voices Ring. Dietzel wrote the lyrics for the song, but asked that he remain anonymous because knowledge that the football coach wrote the lyrics might render it unacceptable to the basketball program. The song was officially introduced on November 16, 1968, prior to the football game against Virginia Tech.

- 1969: Ralph Wahl succeeded Pritchard with a four-year tenure. During this time, Wahl tripled the size of the Carolina Band to 350 members (which was the largest at that time).
- 1973: Thomas O'Neal, served as director for three years. O'Neal brought the band back under the jurisdiction of the Music Department. The tradition of post-game concerts by the Carolina Band began at this time.

=== Mid 1970s-1990 ===
In 1976, James K. Copenhaver succeeded O'Neal. Copenhaver created the Carolina Band pregame show, which was performed through the end of the 2010 season.

=== The SEC years (1990–present) ===
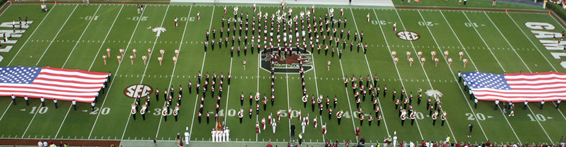
The Carolina Band in the palmetto formation in 2011

Since the athletics program joined the Southeastern Conference in 1992, the Carolina Band has undergone a number of changes. Under the current organizational structure, there are three directors in charge of the band program. These are the Director of Bands, the Director of Athletic Bands, and the assistant director of Bands. The Director of Bands conducts the Wind Ensemble and oversees the band program at large in an administrative role. The Director of Athletic Bands conducts the Symphonic Winds and is in charge of the marching band and pep bands, and concurrently acts as the associate director of Bands. The assistant director of Bands conducts the University Bands and assists the other two directors as the associate director of Athletic Bands.

Dr. David O' Shields served as the Director of Athletic Bands from 1995 until 2006. His tenure oversaw the demolition of the former Band Hall, the move to an Interim Band Hall, and the creation of plans for the new $9.8 million band facility complex which later opened in April 2009. George Brozak served as the Director of Athletic Bands from 2006 until 2009, at the same time scholarships were offered to all Carolina Band members for the first time in the Band's history. He was succeeded by Steve McKeithen from 2009 until 2011.

Following James Copenhaver's retirement in 2010, Dr. Scott Weiss was appointed as Director of Bands at the University of South Carolina. He served in this role until being appointed as the Director of Orchestras in 2019. Rebecca Phillips was appointed Director of Athletic Bands from 2011 until 2014. During this time, the assistant director of Bands position was introduced with Mr. Jayme Taylor serving in this role. In 2014, Mr. Taylor served as the Director of the Athletic Bands along with Interim Assistant Director Mr. Stephen Meyer.

Dr. Cormac Cannon became the Director of Athletic Bands in 2015. When he was appointed as the Director of Bands in 2019, Dr. Jay Jacobs became the Director of Athletic Bands. Dr. Tonya Mitchell-Spradlin served as the assistant director of Bands from 2017 until 2020, being succeeded by Dr. Quintus F. Wrighten Jr., who served in this role from 2021 to 2025. Ben Pouncey became the current Assistant Director of Bands in 2026.

The Carolina Band performed in the 2024 Macy's Thanksgiving Day Parade, the same year the School of Music celebrated its centennial. They initially announced the invitation a year earlier following a halftime performance. Leading up to the parade, the band marched around Downtown Columbia and performed on the steps of the South Carolina State House as part of a larger fundraising campaign to cover the financial costs of the trip. Head football coach Shane Beamer, women's basketball coach Dawn Staley, and USC alum Darius Rucker each contributed $25,000 to the campaign. Members of the band appeared on The Today Show the morning before the parade, with NBC news anchor and South Carolina native Craig Melvin appearing in the band's uniform. The Carolina Band performed a rendition of Greensleeves for the televised portion of the parade at Herald Square.

In 2025, the Carolina Band entered in and won a college marching band contest held by Metallica called "For Whom The Band Tolls" with their Metallica themed half-time show, winning a $50,000 prize as well as the opportunity to record a Metallica song for an upcoming EA Sports College Football video game. The band's recordings of the "Campus Clash" main theme by Kris Bowers as well as the Metallica song "Sad but True" were included in the soundtrack of EA Sports College Football 27.

The Carolina Band made its first international appearance in 2026, traveling to London for London Band Week.

== Traditions ==
=== Pregame ===
The Carolina Band starts out their traditional pregame show marching from the sidelines to the end zone, and playing the Gridiron Fanfare. The band then performs Carolina Let Your Voices Ring (colloquially known as "Old Fight") ending in a set resembling the palmetto and gates symbol. Then, the band performs the national anthem and the school's alma mater, We Hail Thee Carolina. Then, they play their fight song The Fighting Gamecocks Lead the Way, an arrangement of Elmer Bernstein's Step to the Rear, making a "USC" set followed by a march arrangement of We Hail Thee Carolina called the Garnet and Black March or "Alma Marcher". After this, the band plays Go Carolina forming the word "Carolina", and then play a tag and begin a sequence to the tunnel set. After the opening theme from Also sprach Zarathustra, used famously in 2001: A Space Odyssey, is played over the loudspeakers, the football team rushes out and the band plays the fight song, and marches off the field to get ready to play in the stands.

== Facilities ==
The home of the Carolina Band is the Copenhaver Band Hall, located on the University of South Carolina campus at 324 Sumter St. On April 26, 2009, the University of South Carolina opened a facility dedicated to its 300-member marching band and a newly accredited dance program. The $9.8 million complex features practice areas, rehearsal rooms, storage for band instruments/uniforms and an adjacent 110-yard long practice field complete with field lighting and a three-story observation tower. The main level building plan is organized around a series of large practice areas and dance studios along the field-side to the north. Smaller offices and support spaces are located to the south. In 2021, the band started rehearsing in the Jerri and Steve Spurrier Indoor Practice Facility for Saturday rehearsals before home games.

== Pep bands ==
The University of South Carolina has several other athletic bands tied to the Carolina Band, under the same directors. Before home games, the band sends small ensembles to the stadium fairgrounds, Gamecock Park, and the Cockaboose area as tailgate takeover bands.

The Carolina Basketball Band plays at Gamecocks men's and women's basketball home games as well as post-season tournaments. The Basketball Band is divided into two groups. The two groups rotate responsibilities at home games in Colonial Life Arena. For SEC and NCAA tournaments, preference forms are sent out, and rosters for those tournaments are filled based on seniority, part assignments, and the number of times one has been to a specific tournament. There is also a separate volleyball band plays at home women's volleyball games.

== Greek life ==
=== Tau Beta Sigma ===
The Epsilon Alpha chapter of Tau Beta Sigma, National Honorary Band Sorority, founded on December 4th, 1971, is open to all students in the USC Bands program. ΤΒΣ strives to support music programs through funding and service. USC's Epsilon Alpha award-winning chapter of ΤΒΣ works cooperatively with their brother chapter of Kappa Kappa Psi to assist USC Bands with presenting special programs such as the USC Band Clinic, summer clinics, and outreach programs.

=== Kappa Kappa Psi ===
The Zeta Chi chapter of Kappa Kappa Psi, National Honorary Band Fraternity, founded on November 8th, 1974, is open to all students in the USC Bands program. ΚΚΨ provides service and leadership in the band program. USC's Zeta Chi chapter of ΚΚΨ has won numerous national awards.They assist their sister chapter of ΤΒΣ to assist USC Bands with their special programs.
