= Step to the Rear =

Step to the Rear may refer to:

- "Step to the Rear" (1967 song), a song from the 1967 musical How Now, Dow Jones
- Step to the Rear (album), a 1967 album by Marilyn Maye
- "Step to the Rear", a song by Brand Nubian from the 1990 album One for All

== See also ==
- "The Fighting Gamecocks Lead the Way" ("Step to the Rear"), the fight song of University of South Carolina Band
