= A Taste of "Sherry!" =

Studio album by Marilyn Maye
- Released: February 1967
- Studios: RCA Studio A; Webster Hall
- Genre: Pop
- Label: RCA Victor
- Producer: Joe René

Marilyn Maye chronology
The Lamp Is Low (1966)	A Taste of "Sherry!" (1967)	Step to the Rear (1967)

Singles from A Taste of "Sherry!"
- 1. "Long Ago" Released: August 1965; 2. "I've Learned the Way to Sing the Blues" Released: June 1966; 3. "Cabaret" Released: August 1966; 4. "Sherry!" Released: January 1967

A Taste of "Sherry!" is a studio album by American singer Marilyn Maye. It was released in February 1967 by RCA Victor and contained 12 tracks. The album featured Maye's first commercially successful singles: "Cabaret" and "Sherry". Both were featured in Broadway musicals of the same names and both reached the top ten on the American adult contemporary chart. A Taste of "Sherry!" received positive reviews from several publications following its release.

== Background ==
Marilyn Maye had been recording for RCA Victor since 1965 after being discovered by television host Steve Allen. She put out several albums with the label beginning with Meet Marvelous Marilyn Maye. On her debut album, Maye recorded the song "I Love You Today", which Steve Allen had written for a musical. This gave Maye's producer (Joe René) the idea to have her record songs that would be featured in upcoming Broadway musicals. Among these was the song "Cabaret", which became commercially successful. The song was featured in her fourth RCA album A Taste of "Sherry!".

== Recording and content ==
The album was recorded at two New York City locations: RCA Studio A and Webster Hall. The latter was not an official studio. However, the technical procedures used to record there classified A Taste of "Sherry! a studio album. The entirety of the project was produced by Joe René. It featured arrangement by Sid Bass, Claus Ogerman, Marty Manning, Jimmy Wisner and liner notes by Gene Lees.

A Taste of "Sherry!" consisted of 11 tracks. Its title track would later appear in the Broadway musical of the same name. "Cabaret" would also appear in the Broadway musical of the same name. "Long Ago" was featured in the Broadway show Half a Sixpence. Also included are covers of songs that had originally made America's Billboard pop chart: Sidney Bechet's 1956 top five recording of "Petite Fleur (A Time to Love a Time to Cry)" and The Righteous Brothers's 1964 chart-topping "You've Lost That Lovin' Feelin'". "Try to Remember" was a Broadway musical song that had also been a Billboard success by Ed Ames during this period.

== Release and critical reception ==
A Taste of "Sherry!" was originally released by the RCA Victor label in February 1967. It was first offered as a vinyl LP in both mono and stereo versions. Six songs appeared on "Side A" while five songs appeared on "Side B". It was Maye's fourth studio album and fifth album overall. In later decades, it would be re-released in a digital format to retailers such as Apple Music. It received positive reviews from several publications following its original release. Billboard magazine found that Maye's Broadway covers were performed with a "captivating flair". They also added, "She's a hard-sell singer who makes every performance pay off". Cashbox magazine commented that Maye's pop covers demonstrated her "smooth artistry" and concluded, "The artist sings effortlessly with warmth and conviction, and the set is likely to garner much critical acclaim." Record World magazine found that Maye's vocal delivery on the album to be both "smooth" and "sweet".

== Singles ==
A total of four singles were included on A Taste of "Sherry!". It was first was originally released in August 1965 called "Long Ago". It was then followed in June 1966 by the release of "I've Learned the Way to Sing the Blues". "Cabaret" was then issued as a single in August 1966. It became Maye's first charting single, reaching the number nine position on the Billboard adult contemporary chart in October 1966. Its fourth and final single was the title tune in January 1967. It became her second charting single and second top ten single, peaking at number eight on the Billboard adult contemporary chart in March 1967.

== Track listing ==
Side one
No.	Title	Writer(s)	Length
1.	"Sherry!" (from the Broadway production Sherry!)	Lipton; Rosenthal	2:28
2.	"Try to Remember" (from the musical The Fantasticks)	Jones; Schmidt	2:18
3.	"Cabaret" (from the new Broadway musical Cabaret)	Ebb; Kander	2:15
4.	"You've Lost That Lovin' Feelin'"	Spector; Mann; Weil	2:46
5.	"Petite Fleur (A Time to Love a Time to Cry)"	Bechet; Grant; Baum; Kaye	2:39
6.	"Too Little Time"	Liebling; Hamlisch	2:23

Side two
No.	Title	Writer(s)	Length
1.	"If You'll Just Come Back to Me"	Grudeff; Jessel	2:15
2.	"Long Ago" (from the musical production Half a Sixpence)	Heneker	2:45
3.	"Java"	Friday; Toussaint; Tyler	2:18
4.	"Too Much in Love"	Ogerman; Gelber	2:20
5.	"I've Learned the Way to Sing the Blues"	Boring; Comer	2:27

== Technical personnel ==
All credits are adapted from the liner notes of A Taste of "Sherry!".

- Sid Bass – Arrangement
- Ed Begley – Recording engineer
- Mickey Crofford – Recording engineer
- Gene Lees – Liner notes
- Marty Manning – Arrangement
- Claus Ogerman – Arrangement
- Joe René – Producer
- Jimmy Wisner – Arrangement

== Release history ==
Region	Date	Format	Label	Ref.
North America	February 1967	LP Mono; LP Stereo	RCA Victor	
North America	circa 2020	Music download; streaming	Sony Music Entertainment	
