= Marilyn Maye, Girl Singer =

Studio album by Marilyn Maye
- Released: April 1970
- Studio: RCA Studio A; RCA Studio B
- Genre: Pop
- Label: RCA Victor
- Producer: Jim Foglesong; Joe René

Marilyn Maye chronology
The Happiest Sound in Town (1968)	Marilyn Maye, Girl Singer (1970)	Marilyn Maye Sings All of Jerry Herman's "Hello Dolly" (1985)

Singles from Marilyn Maye, Girl Singer
- 1. "Feelin'" Released: November 1968; 2. "I'll Never Fall in Love Again" Released: April 1969

Marilyn Maye, Girl Singer is a studio album by American singer Marilyn Maye. It was released in April 1970 via RCA Victor and was the seventh studio album of her career. It was also her final album released by RCA Victor. Girl Singer contained a total of 11 tracks. Two tracks were originally singles. The 1968 single "Feelin'" became a top 20 song on the American adult contemporary chart. Girl Singer was given a positive review from Record World magazine following its release.

== Background, recording and content ==
Marilyn Maye had been a recording artist for the RCA Victor label since 1965. Her first album was issued the same year and the label released a series of recordings by Maye through 1970. She found chart success with the songs "Cabaret", "Sherry!" and "Step to the Rear". Marilyn Maye, Girl Singer proved to be her last album issued by RCA Victor. The studio project was recorded at New York City's RCA Studios A and B. Unlike her previous releases, the album was produced by Jim Foglesong. Girl Singer consisted of 11 tracks in total. Most of its tracks were covers of songs that made America's Billboard pop music chart. This included Peggy Lee's "I'm a Woman", Cass Elliot's "Make Your Own Kind of Music" and The Everly Brothers's "Let It Be Me".

== Release, critical reception and singles ==
Marilyn Maye, Girl Singer was originally released in April 1970 by RCA Victor. It was the seventh studio album of Maye's career. The label originally offered it as a vinyl LP, with six songs on "Side A" and five songs on "Side B". During the 2020s decade, the album was re-released to digital sites, which included Apple Music. The album was given a positive review from Record World magazine following its original release. The publication noted that Maye's experience of performing at piano bars resulted in her not "missing one spunky note". They further commented, "Marilyn has paid her dues and shows how on "I'm a Woman," "Make Your Own Kind of Music," "Let It Be Me."

Two singles were included on Girl Singer. "Feelin'" was first released by RCA Victor as a single in November 1968. It became a top 20 single on America's Billboard adult contemporary chart, rising to the number 14 position. The second single included on the album was "I'll Never Fall in Love Again", which was first issued in April 1969.

== Track listing ==
Side one
No.	Title	Writer(s)	Length
1.	"I'm a Woman"	Leiber-Stoller	2:43
2.	"The Children in the Street"	Samuels	3:22
3.	"Make Your Own Kind of Music"	Mann; Weil	2:27
4.	"What Do You Say (When You Say Goodbye?)"	Wright; Alexander	2:47
5.	"Yesterday I Heard the Rain"	Lees; Manzanero	2:55
6.	"Feelin'"	Evans; Parnes	2:27

Side two
No.	Title	Writer(s)	Length
1.	"I Need You"	DeShannon	2:36
2.	"Words and Music"	Fisher; Segal	2:30
3.	"Let It Be Me"	Bécaud; Curtis; Delanoë	3:20
4.	"A Brand New Me"	Bell; Butler; Gamble	3:02
5.	"I'll Never Fall in Love Again" (from the Broadway production Promises, Promises)	Bacharach; David	2:42

== Release history ==
Region	Date	Format	Label	Ref.
Japan	April 1970	LP	RCA Records	
North America	April 1970	LP Mono; LP Stereo	RCA Victor	
North America	circa 2020	Music download; streaming	Sony Music Entertainment	
