= Sherry! (song) =

1966 single by Marilyn Maye

"Sherry!" is a song composed by James Lipton and Laurence Rosenthal. It was first recorded in 1966 by American singer Marilyn Maye whose version was released as a single by RCA Victor. It later appeared in the Broadway musical also titled Sherry!. The show premiered in 1967, however, it was never recorded until 2004. "Sherry!" was then recorded for the cast album by American television actress Carol Burnett.

== Background and composition ==
American composers James Lipton and Laurence Rosenthal wrote the musical Sherry!, which was based on a 1939 play. The musical opened on Broadway in 1967 with only 72 performances and was not a success. An original cast album did not appear during its run. The orchestrations were recorded but lost for several decades. The title song was composed by Lipton and Rosenthal as well. Lipton credited Rosenthal to writing "charming and beguiling" music to accompany his writing to the song. Michael Buckley of Playbill theorized that the song's lyrics may pay homage to twentieth century composer Cole Porter.

== Marilyn Maye version ==
"Sherry!"
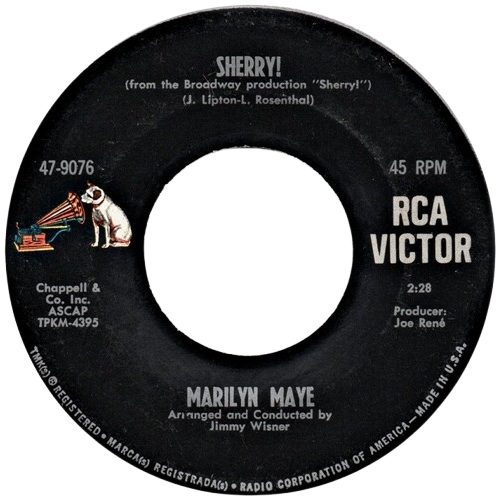

Single by Marilyn Maye

from the album A Taste of "Sherry!"
- B-side: "Too Much in Love"
- Released: January 1967
- Studio: RCA Studio, New York
- Length: 2:28
- Label: RCA Victor
- Songwriters: James Lipton; Laurence Rosenthal
- Producer: Joe René

Marilyn Maye singles chronology
"Cabaret" (1966)	"Sherry!" (1967)	"When We All Get Together" (1967)

=== Background and recording ===
Marilyn Maye had been a recording artist signed to the RCA Victor label since 1965. Her debut studio album, Meet Marvelous Marilyn Maye, was released in 1965 and was followed by two more albums. Maye made the first recordings of songs that would later be included in Broadway musicals. This included "Cabaret" and "Step to the Rear", both of which became commercial successes. Among these songs was "Sherry!". Maye recorded the first version of the song prior to it appearing on Broadway. The song was recorded at RCA Studios in New York City and was produced by Joe René.

=== Release and chart performance ===
"Sherry!" was released as a single by RCA Victor in January 1967. It was backed on the B-side by the song "Too Much in Love". The single was distributed as a seven-inch vinyl single. The song entered the American Billboard adult contemporary chart in February 1967 and spent a total of 13 weeks there. It reached the number eight position on the chart in March 1967. It was Maye's second single to reach the adult contemporary top ten and one of three top ten singles she would have in her career. It served as the title track to Maye's third RCA album titled A Taste of "Sherry!". The album was released in February 1967.

=== Track listing ===
7" vinyl single

- "Sherry!" – 2:28
- "Too Much in Love" – 2:20

=== Charts ===
Weekly chart performance for "Sherry!"
Chart (1967)	Peak position
US Adult Contemporary (Billboard)	8

== Carol Burnett version ==
"Sherry!"

Song by Carol Burnett

from the album Sherry! The Broadway Musical
- Released: February 24, 2004
- Recorded: May 2001–April 2003
- Genre: Broadway
- Length: 5:53
- Label: Angel
- Songwriters: James Lipton; Laurence Rosenthal
- Producers: Jason Buell; James Lipton; Robert Sher; Stuart Triff

=== Background, recording and release ===
In 2000, the orchestrations for Sherry! were discovered at the Library of Congress. Lipton had become a host of the popular television series Inside the Actor's Studio and used his credibility to gather a new cast to record the original songs for Sherry!. Among the cast for the recording of the musical was television actress Carol Burnett. Burnett recorded the new version of "Sherry!" for the album version of the musical. It was recorded between May 2001 and April 2003.

Lipton later recalled to Playbill that "Carol sings it to a fare-thee-well, to my taste". Meanwhile, Michael Buckley of Playbill argued that another version recorded by Christine Baranski is more "definitive". Burnett's version was released on the cast album, which was titled Sherry! The Broadway Musical (World Premiere Cast Recording). The album was released on February 24, 2004, by Angel Records. The album was produced by Jason Buell, James Lipton, Robert Sher and Stuart Triff.
