= The Happiest Sound in Town =

Studio album by Marilyn Maye
- Released: September 1968
- Studio: RCA Studio A; RCA Studio B
- Genre: Easy listening
- Label: RCA Victor
- Producer: Joe René

Marilyn Maye chronology
Step to the Rear (1967)	The Happiest Sound in Town (1968)	Marilyn Maye, Girl Singer (1970)

Singles from The Happiest Sound in Town
- 1. "Sing Me a Tune" Released: May 1969

The Happiest Sound in Town is a studio album by American singer Marilyn Maye. It was released in September 1968 via RCA Victor and contained 11 tracks. It was the sixth studio album of Maye's career featuring songs that were categorized as easy listening material. It featured cover of popular recordings along with new material.

== Background, recording and content ==
Marilyn Maye had been on the RCA Victor label since releasing 1965's Meet Marvelous Marilyn Maye. She found success with "Step to the Rear", which appeared in several televised commercials for the Ford Motor Company. RCA issued six albums of Maye's recordings through 1970. Among them was The Happiest Sound in Town. The project was recorded RCA Studio A and RCA Studio B in New York City. It was produced by Joe René, whom had been serving as Maye's record producer for several albums. René also was credited as an arranger for the album's songs, along with Frank Hunter and Glenn Osser. The liner notes featured a quote from Johnny Carson which read "Let's call her a super-singer."

The album contained 11 tracks. Included were covers of "Rock-a-Bye Your Baby with a Dixie Melody", "Congratulations", "If My Friends Could See Me Now" and "Kansas City", "Detour" and "Consider Yourself". These songs had previously been included in Broadway musicals or had been singles that appeared on America's Billboard pop music chart.

== Release, reception and singles ==
The Happiest Sound in Town was originally released by RCA Victor in September 1968. It was distributed as a vinyl LP, featuring six songs on "Side A" and five songs on "Side B". It was Maye's sixth studio album and fifth with RCA. A special edition version was reissued in Japan in 2000 on CD. During the 2020s it was re-released digitally. In its original release, the album was among 52 LP's released by RCA Victor in the fall of 1968. Although no formal review was given, Billboard magazine named it a "four-star" album in its ratings in October 1968. To promote the album, Maye appeared at New York City's Royal New York venue for two weeks in fall 1968. Also, the album was played on several easy listening stations at the time of its release according to Billboard. "Sing Me a Tune" was issued as a promotional single from the album in May 1969.

== Track listing ==
Side one
No.	Title	Writer(s)	Length
1.	"Congratulations"	Martin; Coulter	2:07
2.	"Sing Me a Tune"	Shelley	2:40
3.	"Rock-a-Bye Your Baby with a Dixie Melody"	Schwartz; Lewis; Young	3:26
4.	"The Happiest Sound in Town"	McLaughlin	1:59
5.	"If My Friends Could See Me Now"	Coleman; Fields	1:55
6.	"Kansas City"	Lieber-Stoller	2:13

Side two
No.	Title	Writer(s)	Length
1.	"Popularity"	Stillman; Cohan	2:30
2.	"Detour"	Westmoreland	2:47
3.	"The Preacher"	Gonzales; Silver	2:26
4.	"Consider Yourself"	Bart	2:26
5.	"Star"	Chan; Van Heusen	2:35

== Technical personnel ==
All credits are adapted from the liner notes of The Happiest Sound in Town.

- Ed Begley – Engineer
- Ray Hall – Engineer
- Frank Hunter – Arranger
- Glenn Osser – Arranger
- Joe René – Arranger, producer
- Anthony Salvatore – Engineer
- Bob Simpson – Engineer

== Release history ==
Region	Date	Format	Label	Ref.
United States	September 1968	LP Mono; LP Stereo	RCA Victor	
Japan	June 21, 2000	Compact disc	BMG; RCA	
North America	circa 2020	Music download; streaming	Sony Music Entertainment	
