= USC Libraries =

USC Libraries can refer to:

- The University of South Carolina Libraries
- The University of Southern California Libraries
