= You're Gonna Hear from Me (song) =

- Dutch release picture sleeve

Single by Andy Williams
- A-side: "Bye Bye Blues"
- Released: 1966
- Genre: Vocal
- Length: 2:47
- Label: Columbia Records 43519
- Songwriters: André Previn, Dory Previn
- Producer: Robert Mersey

Andy Williams singles chronology
"May Each Day" (1966)	"You're Gonna Hear from Me" (1966)	"Bye Bye Blues" (1966)

"You're Gonna Hear from Me" is a song written by André Previn and Dory Previn written for the 1965 movie Inside Daisy Clover and performed, among others, by Andy Williams. The song reached No. 13 on the adult contemporary chart in 1966.

== Recordings ==
- Stanley Turrentine recorded a version for his album 1966 album, The Spoiler.
- Marilyn Maye recorded a version for her 1966 album, The Lamp is Low.
- Frank Sinatra recorded a version for his 1966 album, That's Life.
- Shirley Bassey recorded a version for her 1966 album, I've Got a Song for You.
- Nancy Wilson recorded a version for her 1966 album, A Touch of Today.
- Blossom Dearie recorded a version for her 1967 album, Sweet Blossom Dearie
- Scott Walker recorded a version for his 1967 album, Scott.
- Dionne Warwick recorded a version for her 1967 album, The Windows of the World.
- Eddie Palmieri recorded a version for his 1967 album, Molasses, with Ismael Quintana on vocals.
- Bill Evans recorded versions in 1967 and 1969, which were released on the posthumous albums California Here I Come and You're Gonna Hear from Me in the 1980s.
- Bea Arthur performed the song on the TV show Maude in the 1976 episode "Tuckahoe Bicentennial".
- Rosemary Clooney recorded a version for her 1983 album, My Buddy.
- Barbra Streisand recorded a version for her 2003 album, The Movie Album.
- Diana Ross & The Supremes recorded a version, which remained unreleased until Let the Music Play: Supreme Rarities in 2008.
- Spanish jazz singer Pedro Ruy-Blas recorded a version on his 2015 album, El Americano.
- Veronica Swift recorded a version for her 2019 album, Confessions.
- Solea Pfeiffer performed the song to debut all-female orchestra The Broadway Sinfonietta.
