= The Lamp Is Low =

Song by Mildred Bailey

"The Lamp Is Low" is a popular song from the 1930s. The music was written by composers Peter DeRose and Bert Shefter, adapted from Pavane pour une infante défunte, a composition by Maurice Ravel. The lyrics were written by Mitchell Parish.

Mildred Bailey made the first notable recording of "The Lamp is Low" for Vocalion Records (catalog No. 4845) on April 24, 1939. Covers by various other musicians quickly followed, including one by Tommy Dorsey and His Orchestra (vocal by Jack Leonard) recorded on May 1, 1939, on Victor Records (catalog No. 26259). The Dorsey version was a hit and helped the song to feature on the hit parade in 1939 for nine weeks. The song continues to be a favorite of jazz musicians.

== Other recordings ==
- Dorothy Lamour - Bluebird-B-10302-A - recorded on April 26, 1939, with Lou Bring's Orchestra.
- Kay Kyser and his Orchestra, (vocal by Ginny Simms), recorded April 30, 1939.
- Glenn Miller and his Orchestra (vocal by Ray Eberle), recorded for Bluebird Records on May 25, 1939.
- Jimmy Dorsey and his Orchestra, recorded for Decca Records (catalog No.2579A) on June 16, 1939.
- Connee Boswell - recorded on June 26, 1939, for Decca Records (catalog No. 2597A) with the Harry Sosnik Orchestra.
- Chet Baker - for his album Chet Baker Quartet featuring Russ Freeman (1953).
- Johnny Hartman - for his album All of Me: The Debonair Mr. Hartman (1957).
- Doris Day - for her album Day by Night (1958).
- Steve Lawrence - for his album Swing Softly with Me (1959).
- Robert Goulet - for his album Always You (1962).
- Jack Jones - for his album She Loves Me (1964).
- Patti Page - for her album Love After Midnight (1964).
- Marilyn Maye - for her album The Lamp is Low (1966).
- Ella Fitzgerald - for her album 30 by Ella (1968).
- Laurindo Almeida - for his album Classical Current (1969).
- Carmen Lundy - for her album Good Morning Kiss (1986).
- Robin McKelle - for her album Introducing Robin McKelle (2006).
- Kate McGarry - for her album The Target (2007).

Some samples of the Laurindo Almeida version were used by Nujabes to record Aruarian Dance in the 2004 Samurai Champloo Music Record: Departure album, one of the soundtrack albums from the anime Samurai Champloo.
