= USC School of Music =

USC School of Music may refer to:

- University of South Carolina School of Music, Columbia, South Carolina
- USC Thornton School of Music, Los Angeles, California
