= Step to the Rear (album) =

Studio album by Marilyn Maye
- Released: November 1967
- Studios: RCA Studio A; RCA Studio B
- Genre: Pop
- Label: RCA Victor
- Producer: Joe René

Marilyn Maye chronology
| A Taste of "Sherry!" (1967) | Step to the Rear (1967) | The Happiest Sound in Town (1968) |

Singles from Step to the Rear
- 1. "Step to the Rear" Released: October 1967

Step to the Rear is a studio album by American singer Marilyn Maye. It was released in November 1967 via RCA Victor and contained 11 tracks. Its title song was taken from the Broadway musical How Now Dow Jones and was a single for Maye in 1967. It reached the top five of American adult contemporary chart. The album itself received a positive review from Billboard magazine following its release.

== Background ==
Discovered by television personality Steve Allen, Marilyn Maye soon signed a recording contract with RCA Victor. Her debut studio album, Meet Marvelous Marilyn Maye followed in 1965. The label would release a series of studio recordings of Maye's material during the 1960s. Maye's commercial popularity peaked during this period after recording songs that would be featured in Broadway shows. Among these Broadway tunes was "Step to the Rear", which was taken from the musical How Now Dow Jones. The song's popularity would inspire Maye's next studio album of the same name.

== Recording and content ==
Step to the Rear was produced by Joe René. The album project was recorded at RCA Studio A and RCA Studio B in New York City. It also featured arrangements by Jimmy Wisner and Don Sebesky. The album was a collection of 11 tracks. Along with its title track, several other tracks were taken from Broadway musicals. Among them were the title tunes from Golden Rainbow and Mame. Also included were covers of pop songs that had reached the Billboard top ten. Among them were Bobbie Gentry's "Ode to Billie Joe", Jackie DeShannon's "What the World Needs Now Is Love" and Petula Clark's "Don't Sleep in the Subway".

== Release, critical reception and singles ==
Step to the Rear was originally released by the RCA Victor label in November 1967. It was offered as a vinyl LP in both mono and stereo versions. Six tracks were included on "Side A" while five tracks were included on "Side B". It was Maye's fifth studio album in her career and the fourth released by RCA. In January 1968, the album was released on an 8-track cartridge format by the label. In later years, it was re-released digitally and made available as either a music download or for streaming purposes. In its original release, Step to the Rear was among 22 albums issued by RCA Victor in the later half of 1967. Cashbox magazine named the album among the "most popular" releases of the year. Billboard magazine gave Step to the Rear its December 1967 review. "The music is class 'A' programming for radio and best of all, class 'A' listening," the publication concluded. The only single from the album was the title track, which RCA first issued in October 1967. It became Maye's third top ten single on the American Billboard adult contemporary chart, peaking at the number two position in January 1968.

== Track listing ==
Side one
| No. | Title | Writer(s) | Length |
|---|---|---|---|
| 1. | "Step to the Rear" (from the musical production How Now Dow Jones) | Bernstein; Leigh | 1:59 |
| 2. | "Don't Sleep in the Subway" | Hatch; Trent | 2:59 |
| 3. | "Ode to Billy Joe" | Gentry | 4:27 |
| 4. | "What Now My Love" | Bécaud; Delanoë; Sigman | 3:31 |
| 5. | "Sunny" | Hebb | 2:46 |
| 6. | "Golden Rainbow" (from the Broadway musical production Golden Rainbow) | Marks | 2:41 |

Side two
| No. | Title | Writer(s) | Length |
|---|---|---|---|
| 1. | "Mame" (from the Broadway musical Mame) | Herman | 2:44 |
| 2. | "I Will Wait for You" (from The Umbrellas of Cherbourg) | Gimbel; Legrand | 2:57 |
| 3. | "What the World Needs Now Is Love" | Bacharach; David | 3:10 |
| 4. | "Watch What Happens" (from The Umbrellas of Cherbourg) | Gimbel; Legrand | 3:18 |
| 5. | "A Certain Girl" (from the musical production The Happy Time) | Ebb; Kander | 2:18 |

== Technical personnel ==
All credits are adapted from the liner notes of Step to the Rear.

- Gregory John – Liner photos
- Martin Portley – Liner photos
- Joe René – Producer
- Don Sebesky – Arrangement
- Bob Simpson – Recording engineer
- Don Thomas – Cover photo
- Jimmy Wisner – Arrangement

== Release history ==
| Region | Date | Format | Label | Ref. |
|---|---|---|---|---|
| Japan | November 1967 | Vinyl LP | RCA Victor | |
| North America | November 1967 | LP Mono; LP Stereo | RCA Victor | |
| North America | January 1968 | 8-track cartridge tape | RCA Victor | |
| Japan | 2000 | Compact disc | BMG Funhouse; RCA Vocal LP Collection | |
| North America | circa 2020 | Music download; streaming | Sony Music Entertainment | |
