= The Lamp Is Low (album) =

Studio album by Marilyn Maye
- Released: October 1966
- Venue: Webster Hall
- Genre: Pop
- Label: RCA Victor
- Producer: Joe René

Marilyn Maye chronology
The Second of Maye (1966)	The Lamp Is Low (1966)	A Taste of "Sherry!" (1967)

The Lamp Is Low is a studio album by American singer Marilyn Maye. It was released in October 1966 via RCA Victor and contained 12 tracks. The album was a mixture of both original material and cover songs. Of its cover songs were recordings from 1960s films and jazz standards. Among its Jazz tracks was the album's title track. It received positive reviews from Billboard and Cashbox magazines. The album has been considered a "classic" disc since its original release.

== Background and recording ==
Marilyn Maye had been a nightclub performer until being discovered by Steve Allen. He soon had her appear regularly on his syndicate television show, which brought Maye to the attention of RCA Victor. The label signed her to a recording contract in 1965 and her first album with the label was released called Meet Marvelous Marilyn Maye. Her third RCA album was The Lamp Is Low, which was the second she recorded at Webster Hall. It was her second recorded at the venue and her third produced by Joe René. Although not recorded at an official studio, the project did not feature a live audience and also included other production routines that made it a studio album.

== Content ==
The Lamp Is Low consisted of 12 tracks. The album was described in its liner notes as being a collection of "late night intimate songs". Cashbox magazine also highlighted it as an album of ballads, noting that songs like "Love Me True" and "You're Gonna Hear from Me" were both "warm and intimate". A majority of the album's tracks were new recordings such as "You're Gonna Hear from Me", "I Can See the Rainbow Now", "If I Were in Your Shoes" and "Too Late Now". Other selections were taken from Warner Bros. movies like "Love Me True", "Quiet Nights of Quiet Stars" and "Livin' Alone".

== Release, critical reception and legacy ==
The Lamp Is Low was originally released in October 1966 by the RCA Victor label. It was originally offered in both mono and stereo vinyl LP versions. Six songs were included on both sides of the record. It was later re-released to digital retailers such as Apple Music. In its original release, it was given positive reviews. Billboard magazine named it among its "Special Merit Picks" in an October 1966 review: "This package is another demonstration of her superlative styling." The publication also noted that although she has developed a following, a breakthrough has yet to be achieved. Cashbox magazine named the album among its "Pop Best Bets" in October 1966. "Big things coming up for Marilyn," they concluded.

Since its release, The Lamp Is Low has been considered a "classic". "Too Late Now" was later chosen as a track on the album 110 Best American Compositions of the Twentieth Century, which was produced by the Smithsonian Institution.

== Track listing ==
Side one
No.	Title	Writer(s)	Length
1.	"The Lamp Is Low"	DeRose; Shefter; Ravel	2:30
2.	"I Can See the Rainbow Now"	Carol J. Comer	2:45
3.	"If I Were in Your Shoes"	Ebb; Kander	3:20
4.	"Love Me True" (Love theme from Cast a Giant Shadow)	Bernstein; Sheldon	2:59
5.	"You're Gonna Hear from Me" (from the Warner Bros. motion picture Inside Daisy Clover)	A. Previn; D. Previn	3:09
6.	"If I Just Stand Still"	Fisher; Segal	3:50

Side two
No.	Title	Writer(s)	Length
1.	"The Night We Called It a Day"	Addair; Dennis	2:30
2.	"Quiet Nights of Quiet Stars (Corcovado)"	Jombim; Lees	2:45
3.	"Livin' Alone"	A. Previn; D. Previn	2:19
4.	"Too Late Now"	Lane; Lehner	3:48
5.	"Someday (Forget Me Not)" (from the Warner Bros. motion picture Harper)	Moross; Giordano	2:48
6.	"Love–Wise"	Elmslie; Fisher	2:57

== Technical personnel ==
All credits are adapted from the liner notes of The Lamp Is Low.

- Robert L. Beckhard – Photography
- Gene Lees – Liner notes
- Mickey Crofford – Recording engineer
- Peter Matz – Arranger
- Joe René – Producer

== Release history ==
Region	Date	Format	Label	Ref.
North America	October 1966	LP Mono; LP Stereo	RCA Victor	
North America	circa 2020	Music download; streaming	Sony Music Entertainment	
