= Tayloe Harding =

American composer, author

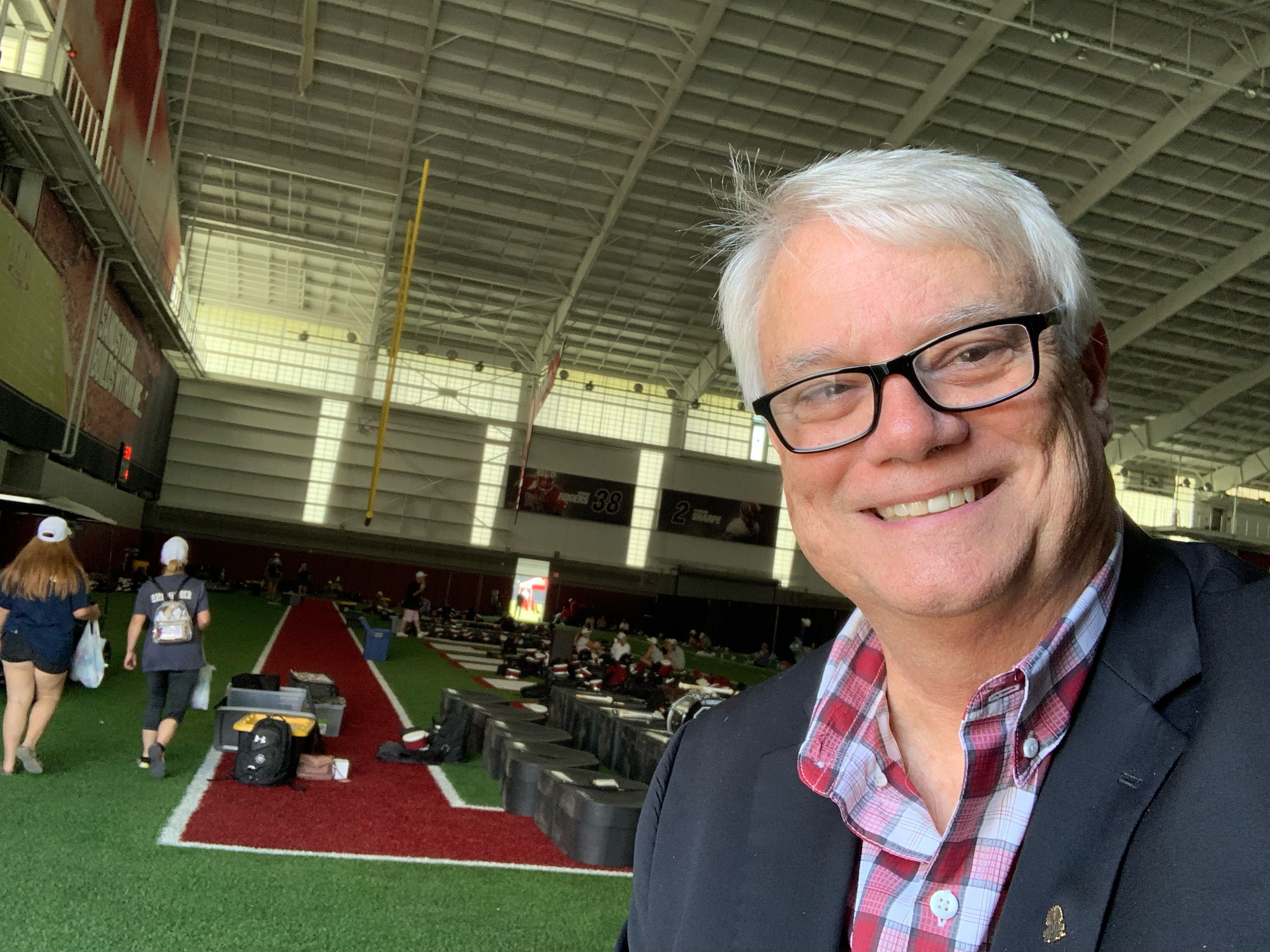
- Born: March 18, 1959 (age 66)
- Occupation: Dean of the University of South Carolina School of Music

Tayloe Harding Jr, DMA (born Richmond, VA, March 18, 1959) is an American composer, author, and music administrator. He has been serving as the Dean of the School of Music at the University of South Carolina since 2005. In addition to his deanship, he is also the Ira McKissick Koger Professor of the Arts.

He took on the role of Interim Provost for the university during the 2019–2020 academic year. Before this, he acted as the interim dean for the university's nationally ranked South Carolina Honors College from 2010 to 2011 and its College of Social Work from 2016 to 2017.

== Education ==
Harding earned a Bachelor of Music Education from the University of Florida in 1981. He earned two graduate degrees– Master of Music in Composition in 1983 and Doctor of Music in Composition in 1984– from the Bienen School of Music at Northwestern University.

== Career ==
He served as the President of the College Music Society (CMS) from 2005 to 2006. Following his presidency, he led the CMS Fund's first-ever capital campaign to successful completion in 2011 as the president of the CMS Fund from 2009 to 2016.

From 2015 to 2020, he served as the national Secretary of the National Association of Schools of Music (NASM). In 2021, he was elected as the vice president for the 2022–2024 term and is the President-elect for the 2025–2027 term of NASM.

== Awards ==
From 1989-2015, he received ASCAPLU$ Standard Awards from the American Society of Composers, Authors and Publishers.

In 2006, Harding received the Distinguished Alumnus Award from the University of Florida.

In 2021, he received Governors’ Award in Arts Education by the South Carolina Arts Commission.

== Publications ==
=== Compositions ===
- The War Prayer (2009), by Mareba Music, Inc., 2009.
- Appling (2008), by Mareba Music, Inc., 2008.
- A Mile of Phrygian at 60 (2007), by Mareba Music, Inc., 2007.
- Fantabeljin (2006), by Mareba Music, Inc., 2006.
- The Springfield Trio (2005), by Mareba Music, Inc., 2005.
- Canticle for Communion (2004), by Mareba Music, Inc., 2004
- The Seven Churches of Easter, Richmond: 1984 (2002), by Mareba, 2003
- Sacraments From Faith (2001-2), by Mareba Music, Inc., 2002
- Crest (2000), by Mareba Music, Inc., 2000.
- m-M-H-B (1999), by Mareba Music, Inc., 1999.
- Winning Azaleas (1998), by Mareba Music, Inc., 1998.
- At the End (1997), by Mareba Music, Inc., 1997.
- The Rosewood Concerto (1996) by Mareba Music, Inc., 1996.
- Palma Sola Suite (1995) by Mareba Music, Inc., 1995.
- Expanding Mottos (1990) by Mareba Music, Inc., 1992
- Song for the Magic of the Uniting Souls (1992), Mareba Music, Inc., 1992.
- TABLES (1986) by Mareba Music, Inc., 1991.
- Pamlico Legacy (1985) by Mareba Music, Inc., 1990.
- Quartet for Saxophones (1990) by Mareba Music, Inc., 1990.
- CROSSES (1988) by Mareba Music, Inc., 1990.
- FIDDLEHEAD (1992) by Collected Editions, Ltd., Atlanta, 1993.
- In the Shadow of Liberty (1991-2) by Mareba Music, Inc., 1992.
- Psalm 119 (1987) by Mareba Music, Inc., 1991.
- Three Poems of Emmett Williams (1983) by Mareba Music, Inc., 1991.
- LINES From a Roslyn Baptism (1989) by Mareba Music, Inc., 1990.

=== Commissions ===
- Baritone Jacob Will, for a song cycle on the EA Poe poem The Bells, entitled The Bells (2015), Fall 2014, Sept 2015 premiere, Columbia, SC.
- The Jessleson/Fugo Duo, for a work for cello and piano to celebrate their 30th Anniversary entitled At the Marion Opera House (2012), Spring 2011, Sept 2012 premier, Columbia, SC
- Pi Kappa Lambda, National Professional Music Honorary Society, for a new chamber work, Profile Variations (2010) as part of capturing the 2010 PKL Composition Commission Competition, Oct 2009 for its Oct 2010 premier, Minneapolis, MN.
- William (Ted) Moore, for wife Linda Moore, a new love song as part of the Friends of The School of Music's Sterling & Steel fundraiser auction, Feb 2009 to be performed on Chamber Innovista concert, Feb 14, 2010.
- USC Concert Choir, for a new choral cantata entitled The War Prayer (2008) to the Mark Twain text of the same name December 2007 to be premiered as a pair with the Britten Cantata Misericordium at the Choir's Spring 2009 Concert entitled SONGS OF LOVE AND WAR, April 2, 2009.
- RoseWind Sax/Marimba Duo, for a saxophone and marimba duet, entitled A Mile of Phrygian at 60 (2007) to be recorded on their disk, Release, 2008.
- A consortium of several alto saxophonists for a short unaccompanied work for alto saxophone, Fantabeljin (2006) to be premiered at a variety of locations, 2007–9.

=== Scholarly Writings ===
- Chapter: “Why Music Entrepreneurship and Why in Music Training?” in the book Disciplining the Arts: Teaching Entrepreneurship in Context edited by Gary ‘Beckman, Rowman And Littlefield, New York, 2011.
- Article: “Fostering Creativity for Leadership and Leading Change,” in the journal Arts Education Policy Review, scheduled for publication, January 2010.
- Book Chapter: “Terry Riley: Minimalism, Mysticism, and More,” published in New Music Across America, edited by Iris Brooks. California Institute of the Arts Press, Valencia, CA, 1992.

=== Articles & Abstracts ===
- “President’s Message” columns, for the CMS Newsletter, Jan, March, May, Sept, Nov 2005, 2006, and 2007.
- “College-Community Partnerships: The Engaged Campus” published in the college music Society Newsletter, Jan 2002. Refereed.
- “Music Disciplines Advocacy Report,” published in the Sept. 2000 issue of the College Music Society Newsletter. Invitation.
- “Peer Review of Teaching Cookbook, or An Annotated Recipe for Initiating a Review Process,” invited for publication, August 1997 for January 1998 NEWSLETTER of the College Music Society.
- Paper: “The Peer Review of Teaching,” delivered at NASM meeting, San Diego,
- CA, November 27, 1997. Invitation of NASM Region III, Proceedings of the 73rd Annual Meeting, NASM, published, August 1998.
- Performance of composition Pamlico Legacy (1985) at the Special meeting of the Southern Chapter of the College Music Society, Brunnthal, Germany, June 27, 1992, CMS Proceedings, 1992.
- Performance of composition Pamlico Legacy (1985) at the Annual Meeting of the REG. V of the Society of Composers, Inc., at Southern Ill. Univ. - Carbondale, March 24, “Proceedings of the SCI REGION Annual Meeting, 1991.”
- Paper: “The Serial and Aleatoric Construction of Calendar Music 1979b (1983-4)” delivered at the Southern Chapter of the College Music Society Annual Meeting, San Juan, Puerto Rico, “Proceedings of the CMS Chapter Meetings,” 1990.
- Performance of composition Quartet for Saxophones (1990) at the Annual Meeting of the Central Chapter of the National Saxophone Congress, Central Michigan University, Mr. Pleasant, MI noted in the “Notes from the Annual Chapter Meetings” Meeting of the NSC - 1990.
- Performance of composition Pamlico Legacy (1985) at the Annual Meeting of the Great Lakes Chapter of the College Music Society, Milwaukee, WI, April 8, 1989. Published in the CMS Proceedings, 1989.
