= Clemson University Tiger Band =

College marching band

The Clemson University Tiger Band
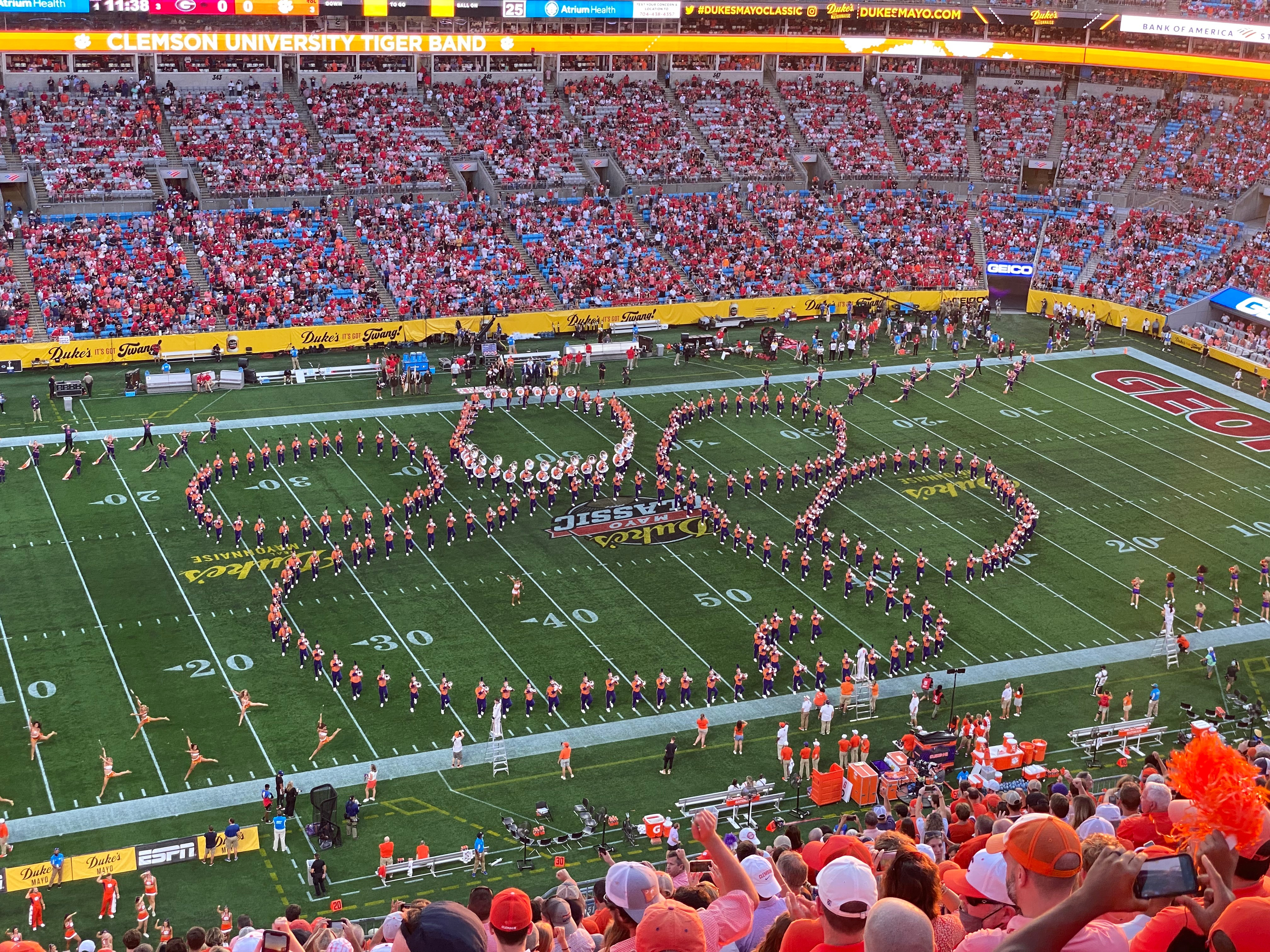
- The Clemson University Tiger Band in the iconic Tiger Paw formation during their pregame performance at the 2021 Duke's Mayo Classic
- School: Clemson University
- Location: Clemson, South Carolina
- Conference: Atlantic Coast Conference
- Director: Mark J. Spede
- Associate Director: Tim Hurlburt
- Assistant Director: Emily Hamlyn
- Members: 355
- Fight song: "Tiger Rag"
- Website: https://www.clemson.edu/tigerband/

The Clemson University Tiger Band serves as the Marching Band, Color Guard, Tiger Dancers and Tiger Twirlers of Clemson University. The marching band component of the band is made up of wind instruments, percussion, and auxiliary units, including the piccolo, clarinet, alto saxophone, tenor saxophone, trumpet, horn, trombone, baritone, and sousaphone.

A drum line consisting of snares, basses, cymbals, tenors, and a front ensemble is used. To the thousands of fans, it is known as the Tiger Band, or better yet the "band that shakes the Southland". Composed of over 300 members, Tiger Band's mission is to provide inspiring spirit and entertainment to not only the university, but beyond.

The band performs halftime shows for every Clemson football home game, traveling to as many away games as possible, including their annual matchup against South Carolina where they share the halftime field with the Carolina Band. The Tiger Band also has participated in several post-season events, including Champ Sports, Peach, Humanitarian, Gator, Independence, Citrus, Hall of Fame and Orange Bowl games. The Color Guard also performs during the off-season as the Clemson Winterguard. The team participates in competitions through the winter and early spring.

The Tiger Twirlers, Tiger Dancers, and Color Guard are important members of the Tiger Band, and they perform any time the full band is performing together. This includes pep rallies, pre-game and halftime performances at home games, some away games, the First Friday Parade, bowl games, and other major performances. The Tiger Twirlers, Tiger Dancers, and Color Guard are a large part of the visual component of the Tiger Band's performance, and they bring more excitement to the show.

== History ==
=== Pre-1950 ===
Before the 1950s, Clemson University was strictly a military college. Even though it did not accept civilian students, there was always a band of some sort, most often a Cadet Corps band. In the mid-1930s (around 1935), Dr. Edward Jones Freeman (for whom Freeman Hall, an educational building on Clemson's campus, is named) wrote a fight song for the school called "Tiger Rah," a song which would eventually be reintroduced to the university in the 2002 football season.

In 1937, the band, then known as "The Clemson College Band Company," broke into four different bands: the Parade Band, the Concert Band, the Junior Band, and the College Dance Orchestra.

In 1938, the Clemson Concert Band performed on The National Farm and Home Hour radio program on NBC.

In 1902, the Clemson band performed at the dedication of the Confederate memorial in Anderson.

=== 1950s–present ===
In 1955, Clemson College was opened up to the civilian population as a public college, and in that year, the band was renamed to its current name, the "Tiger Band."

During the 1960s, the Clemson Tiger Band began to expand their horizons. In 1961, the Tiger Band received a permanent building that included a library and rooms for practice, offices, and storage. That year baton twirlers were also added to the Tiger Band ensemble.

In 1962, the Clemson Tiger Band was invited to travel to Washington, D.C. in order to perform for the then-President of the United States of America, John F. Kennedy. In 1964, the Tiger Band was again invited to perform on a national scale, this time during the halftime show of the football game between the Baltimore Colts and the Minnesota Vikings, which was shown live on CBS.

In 1970, the Clemson Tiger Band reached a monumental milestone by inducting fourteen women into the band as the college's first female musicians. During 1978, the band uniform was designed and introduced by Dr. Cook.

In 1980, the band formation that spells out "CLEMSON" at the end of halftime shows was added to the log of formations that the band was capable of performing. In 1984, Clemson's Tiger Band made the switch from pen and paper to computers in order to generate their drill formations, a move that vastly reduced the time it took to draw up such plans, since at the time, the Tiger Band consisted of 276 musicians, flags, and twirlers.

In 1991, Clemson began the construction of the $12 million Brooks Center for the Performing Arts, which, upon its completion in 1994, became the permanent home of the Clemson University Tiger Band. Also in 1991, the Clemson Tiger Band travelled to Tokyo in order to perform in the Japan Bowl, sponsored by Coca-Cola.

In the early 2000s, many different songs and additions were made to the band's setlist, giving the Tiger Band more than 15 ways to perform the Clemson University fight song, with each having their own marching formations.

In 2013, the band's tribute to Nintendo game characters attracted attention. CBS Sports described the band as "raising the bar for halftime performances, challenging Ohio State for fan favorite of the year with this tribute to classic Nintendo games."

== Traditions ==
=== The Tiger Rag ===
Clemson's band director in 1942, Dean Ross, stumbled upon "Tiger Rag", originally recorded and copyrighted by the Original Dixieland Jass Band in 1917, in an Atlanta music store. Also known as "the song that shakes the southland", the Tiger Rag was brought back to Clemson to be taught to the Tiger Band to play at football games. Since 1942, the Tiger Band has learned more than 15 ways to play the Tiger Rag and performs at all Tiger sporting events, pep rallies, and parades.

=== "90 Minutes Before Kickoff Concert" ===
In 2002, a new tradition was added. Before every home football game, the Tiger Band performs their "90 Minutes Before Kick-off Concert," which takes place in the outdoor amphitheater. Starting 90 minutes before kickoff, the Tiger Band plays classic songs such as "Tiger Rag" and "Eye of the Tiger" before they march their way down Fort Hill Street towards Memorial Stadium.

=== Tiger Band Kidz Club ===
A recently added tradition is the Tiger Band Kidz Klub, which started in 2003. Every Friday before home games during the football season, children in the community are invited to the practice field to watch the band's Friday rehearsal, meet the band members and learn more about the instruments, and participate in some of the band's activities.

=== "Roaming Rag" ===
On occasion, following home football games, Tiger Band forms small pep bands. These volunteer ensembles perform at tailgates around the stadium and on campus. They perform songs such as Tiger Rag, Clemson University Alma Mater, and other pep tunes. The main effort is to collect donations. Proceeds in the past have gone to ALS research and Dabo Swinney's (Clemson University's head football coach) ALL IN Foundation for Breast Cancer Research.
