= James A. Hall =

American musician

James A. Hall, Sr. (born 1939) is an American percussionist, jazz drummer, jazz guitarist, music educator, and Distinguished Professor Emeritus at the University of South Carolina School of Music.

== Selected discography ==
- The Dick Goodwin Jazz Quintet, Columbia, South Carolina: Dick Goodwin Musics (1978) OCLC 15125326
- Faculty Sextet, University of South Carolina, Columbia, SC School of Music (1989) OCLC 28627427
- Dick Goodwin Quintet, Studio Time, Columbia, South Carolina OCLC 154204802
- The Dick Goodwin Big Band, Studio Time 2, Columbia, South Carolina (2006) OCLC 173024380
- Pete Neighbour, It's Alright With Me, Columbia, South Carolina: Pete Neighbour (E)(No #2) OCLC 28627427. Recorded in Columbia, South Carolina, January–May 2009
