= Marilyn Maye =

American cabaret and jazz singer and musical theater actress (born 1928)

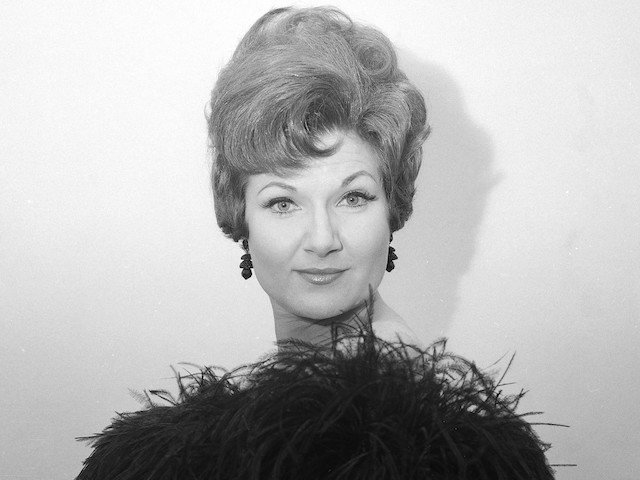
- Marilyn Maye in 1967.
- Born: Marilyn Maye McLaughlin; April 10, 1928 (age 98); Wichita, Kansas, U.S.
- Occupations: Singer; theater actress; masterclass educator
- Years active: 1946–present
- Spouses: 3, including: Jimmy De Fore (divorced); Sammy Tucker (divorced)
- Children: 1
- Relatives: Joy Hodges (cousin)
- Musical career
- Origin: Kansas City, Missouri
- Genres: Cabaret; jazz; pop
- Instrument: Vocals
- Labels: Holly; RCA Victor; Marilyn Maye
- Website: marilynmaye.com

Marilyn Maye McLaughlin (born April 10, 1928) is an American singer, musical theater actress and masterclass educator. With a career spanning eight decades, Maye has performed music in the styles of cabaret, jazz and pop music. She has received one nomination from the Grammy Awards and had commercial success as a recording artist.

Maye was raised in both Kansas and Iowa. With her mother's encouragement, Maye performed onstage and on the radio during her childhood. In her teenage years, she had her own radio program in Des Moines, Iowa. Maye performed locally during the 1940s and 1950s until being discovered in 1963 by Steve Allen, later appearing on his television show. She also began a 76-episode run on The Tonight Show Starring Johnny Carson. This led to her signing a recording contract with RCA Victor.

Between 1965 and 1970, Maye recorded a series of albums for RCA. Her debut studio album Meet Marvelous Marilyn Maye was released in 1965. Producer Joe René brought Maye Broadway show tunes to record prior to them appearing in musicals. Many of these songs were issued by RCA as singles and some became successful. Three singles reached the American adult contemporary top ten: "Cabaret" (1966), "Sherry!" (1967) and "Step to the Rear" (1967).

By the 1970s, the nightclub circuit began to disappear and Maye found performing work elsewhere. For two decades, she made regional appearances in musicals like Hello, Dolly!, Mame and Follies. She also continued her recording career, releasing an album of music from Hello Dolly in 1985 and a tribute album of songs to Ray Charles in 2005. She also continued working across the United States in smaller venues. In 2006, she gained attention after performing in New York City at the Mabel Mercer Foundation. This led to Maye gaining a new audience in her late seventies and a renewed interest in her concert appearances. Now in her nineties, Maye has continued to appear regularly in concert.

== Early life ==
Marilyn Maye McLaughlin was born on April 10, 1928 in Wichita, Kansas to father Kenneth and mother Lyla McLaughlin. She was named after Marilyn Miller, a 1920s singer and performer. Maye's cousin was Broadway actress Joy Hodges. Her father was a pharmacist who relocated the family to nearby Topeka where he ran a drugstore. During this period, her mother encouraged her daughter to sing and perform. "Mother was a very strong lady, so thank God I had talent, because she was determined to make me a singer," she told Theatre Mania in 2007. Lyla McLaughlin had her daughter begin singing and dancing at age three. She also had Maye train with a classical vocal coach in Topeka.

At age nine, Marilyn won a Topeka talent contest. This led to her landing a 13-week radio spot on WIBW and she earned a total of three dollars, which would be equivalent to $67 in 2025. In 1939, she performed in a children's revue program in Topeka's Jayhawk Theatre. In her childhood, Marilyn's parents divorced. Her mother relocated to Des Moines, Iowa and Marilyn moved with her. By age 13, she was performing inside ballrooms often singing big band music. Since she was underage, prompting Maye's mother kept a book where to record the false ages of her daughter to remember to tell it to agents. She had own her weekly radio program during her teenage years in Iowa. She often skipped her high school Spanish class so she could make regular radio appearances. In 1946, Marilyn graduated from East High School in Des Moines.

== Career ==
=== 1946–1961: Early career in the Midwest ===
Following her 1946 high school graduation, Maye became a staff vocalist for WHAS radio in Louisville, Kentucky. There she performed with combos and orchestras. She then embarked as a solo performer throughout the Midwest United States, including nightclubs in Chicago, Illinois. Among her Midwest gigs was the President Hotel, located in the downtown district of Kansas City, Missouri. At the hotel she met dancer Jimmy De Fore, whom she later married. De Fore became the opening act in her shows.

After marrying De Fore, Maye relocated permanently to Kansas City. During this period, the couple operated a children's dance studio in Kansas City. De Fore taught dancing and Maye taught singing. Maye also took on a gig as the permanent performer at Kansas City's Colony Steakhouse. She worked alongside pianist (and her now second husband) Sammy Tucker. She remained at Colony Steakhouse for 11 years. The arrangements and musical routines she developed at the Colony would later be used on her first albums. Maye then recorded her first album in an attempt to bring her to the attention of major record labels. In 1961, the Holly record label released Marilyn...the Most. It featured compositions by Midwest writer Carl Bolte, Jr. and was a locally distributed album in Missouri.

=== 1963–1970: Breakthrough at RCA Records, The Tonight Show and peak years ===
In 1963, Maye was performing at a nightclub when she was heard by television personality Steve Allen. He was also brought to the attention of her debut album, which impressed him enough to book her for several appearances on The Steve Allen Show. She also continued to perform at the Colony Steakhouse in Kansas City. Maye performed on The Steve Allen Show a total of six times. On the sixth show, she was heard by a label executive from RCA Victor. She officially signed with the label in 1965. Maye then began recording with Joe René, who produced her first RCA Victor album. Titled Meet Marvelous Marilyn Maye, the album was released in August 1965 and featured liner notes from Steve Allen. It was given a positive review from Billboard magazine, who named it a "Pop Special Merit" pick in its weekly list of albums.

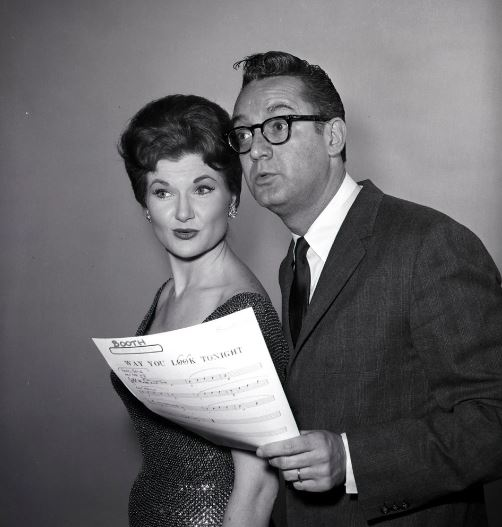
Maye was discovered by Steve Allen in the early 1960s. Her performances on his television program led to a recording contract with RCA Victor that brought Maye commercial success during the decade.

Maye was then heard at a New York City nightclub by Ed McMahon of The Tonight Show Starring Johnny Carson. He advocated for her to appear on the late-night television program and she first appeared there in 1966. Maye went on to appear on The Tonight Show for a record 76 times, the most of any music artist. RCA Victor also released two albums of Maye's material in 1966. This began with the release of a live LP titled The Second of Maye. It was recorded at The Living Room in New York City and featured accompaniment from Maye's husband's quartet. A studio project titled The Lamp Is Low was then released in October 1966. Most of the tracks were new material that were cut in a jazz style.

After recording "I Love You Today" for an upcoming musical, producer Joe René was inspired to bring Maye more show tune material. In 1966, René had Maye record "Cabaret" from the Broadway musical of the same name. Released as a single, "Cabaret" became her breakthrough recording. In 1966, it reached number nine on America's Billboard adult contemporary chart. It was followed by "Sherry!", which would appear in the Broadway show of the same name. Similar to its predecessor, "Sherry!" climbed into the top ten of the Billboard adult contemporary chart. Both were included on Maye's fourth studio album titled A Taste of "Sherry!" (1967). It was her next single that became her most commercially successful recording. Taken from the Broadway musical How Now, Dow Jones, Maye's version of "Step to the Rear" reached number two on the adult contemporary chart in 1968. It was then included in Maye's fifth studio album of the same name.

Now in popular demand, Maye made appearances on many popular television programs. During this period, she appeared periodically on The Ed Sullivan Show, The Dick Cavett Show, The Merv Griffin Show and The Mike Douglas Show. She continued to be a concert attraction in New York City's nightclub circuit. She also performed at political functions, including Iowa Governor Robert D. Ray and US Senator Bob Dole. In 1966, she was nominated by the Grammy Awards for Best New Artist, but ultimately lost to Tom Jones. In 1969, "Step to the Rear" began being featured in televised advertisements for the Lincoln and Mercury automobiles. Maye recorded the song with new lyrics to match the advertisement. She received a new car from Lincoln–Mercury for several years.

RCA Victor kept Maye under contract until 1970 and she continued recording a steady output of material. Her sixth studio album The Happiest Sound in Town appeared in 1968. That same year, the song "Feelin'" became a top 20 single on the Billboard adult contemporary chart. A duet with Ed Ames titled "Think Summer" also reached the adult contemporary top 20 during this time. RCA issued Maye's final studio album with their label in 1970 called Marilyn Maye, Girl Singer.

=== 1971–2005: Changing directions and musical theater ===
Maye departed RCA Victor by 1970. She found less work on the nightclub circuit as supper clubs declined in popularity. "I was too late to have a big career," she told Theater Mania. "It was amazing that I was able to as much as I did in the 1960s, and even more amazing that I was able to carry on into the ’70s — because by that time, of course, music had totally changed." The only concert work she could find was on the American West Coast, which had limited availability. Meanwhile, she maintained consistent appearances The Tonight Show with Johnny Carson throughout the decade. She made her final performance there in 1979.

Maye also started appearing in regional theater productions during the 1970s. She played a series of shows at the Starlight Theatre in Kansas City, Missouri. This began in 1970 when she starred as Dolly Levi in Hello, Dolly!. She also performed in the Starlight's production of Can-Can. "I performed the part of Pistache and loved singing 'C'est Magnifique' each night," she told Playbill magazine. In 1973, she appeared at the Starlight again in The Doc Severinsen Show. In Houston, Texas she played the lead in Mame. In 1990, Maye auditioned for the lead in a regional production of Follies. After the role was given to another actress, Maye was instead giving the supporting role of Carlotta.

Maye also continued her career as singer and recording artist. She took her concerts to performing arts centers and smaller venues around the United States. In 1981, she began working with Billy Stritch who has since been her off-and-off accompanist and music director. On her own Marilyn Maye Records, she released a studio collection called Marilyn Maye Sings All of Jerry Herman's "Hello Dolly". Released in 1985, the album was a collection of songs from the original musical. Writer of the show Jerry Herman penned the album's lines notes, calling Maye an "extraordinary combination of acting and singing talent".

More studio albums followed. In 2005, she released a studio album of songs first recorded by Ray Charles. Titled Maye Sings Ray, the album was also released on her own record label. Author Will Friedwald praised the disc, commenting that "she takes Brother Ray's signatures and refits them for herself while retaining the essence of the original." Maye released another studio album in 2005 featuring songs she performed on Johnny Carson's show called Super Singer – A Tribute to Johnny Carson. The disc included "Here's That Rainy Day", which was Carson's favorite song Maye sang.

=== 2006–present: No retirement ===
Despite her age, Maye stated to many publications that she refused to retire and continued performing. In 2006 at age 78, Maye gained notable attention after performing at New York City's Lincoln Center for the Mabel Mercer Foundation. With encouragement from Billy Stritch and her lawyer, Maye went on to perform at New York's Metropolitan Room where she reportedly "blew the roof off". From there, began returning to New York City with more frequency, doing nearly ten shows yearly. In April 2007, she returned to New York and did a 14-show engagement. "Now in her mid-70s, combines Broadway brass and jazz scooby-do with such a natural feel for both that they become twin styles that you can hardly tell apart," wrote Stephen Holden of The New York Times.

At age 80, she returned in 2008 to the Metropolitan room with a new stage show of Cabaret music called "Love on the Rocks". The program featured both popular nightclub songs, along with more recent covers such as songs by James Taylor. Maye continued to draw concert work in other places such as Philadelphia, Pennsylvania, Sioux City, Iowa and Provincetown, Massachusetts. In the 2010s, Maye continued a regular concert schedule throughout the United States, including continual New York City engagements. In 2010, she performed at a Carnegie Hall concert in celebration of Stephen Sondheim's 80th birthday. In both 2011 and 2012, she performed at Feinstein's at Loews Regency.

Approaching the age of 90, Maye was featured in a 2018 episode of CBS Sunday Morning, with a profile by Mo Rocca. When she was 93, Rocca profiled her again for the television program. Maye discussed the loss of concert work due to the COVID-19 pandemic and how she continued to perform outdoors when indoor nationwide shutdowns occurred. At age 95, Maye made her solo concert debut at Carnegie Hall. The concert drew positive reviews from critics who remarked at the singer's age and vocal ability. "Maye is a master of the American songbook and for two solid hours, she had the crowd eating from the palm of her hand," wrote Ryan Leeds of the Manhattan Digest. "For this writer who has, for some time, marveled at the breadth of her talent and endurance, she is The Unstoppable Marilyn Maye," wrote Stephen Mosher of BroadwayWorld.

== Masterclasses and coaching ==
In addition to her music career, Maye also teaches masterclasses about stage presence and singing. She regularly works with performers ranging from young adults to older adults. Maye has also provided individual vocal coaching and performing lessons for aspiring singers. "The teaching has been really inspirational to me," she told Kansas City Magazine. She was approached to teach master classes in her senior years and was originally reluctant to take the opportunity. Ultimately, she agreed to teaching after realizing that she was passing on a legacy to other music artists. "The more I work, the more I learn, and the more I like to pass on to people who have the passion for singing," she told The Observer.

== Artistry ==
Maye's musical style encompasses cabaret, jazz and pop. For performing in many of New York's nightclubs for several decades, she has been referred to as the "Queen of Cabaret". "To attend one of her shows is to be at an exalted master class of 'how it’s done'," wrote Marilyn Lester of the publication Night Life Exchange. Maye's jazz musical style is shown through her live performances which often include scat singing and vocal swinging. Bruce Ferrier of The Desert Sun called Maye one of the last "scat-singing" jazz artists and compared her to Ella Fitzgerald, Carmen McRae and Anita O'Day. Ricky Pope of BroadwayWorld said, "The fact that she managed to scat sing in 'NY State of Mind' is a testament to her great artistry."

Maye has cited Edith Piaf and Jo Stafford as musical influences.

== Legacy, honors and recognition ==
Nate Chinen of NPR called her "one of our greatest living songbook singers". The New York Times called her "the last of a great generation of American Songbook singers.". Ella Fitzgerald (a friend of Maye's and a fan of her work) referred to Maye as "the greatest white female singer in the world". Her version of "Too Late Now" was included in the Smithsonian Institution recordings of the 20th Century.

Maye has been the recipient of awards and honors in her later years. In 2008, she received a Distinguished Arts Award from the Governor of Kansas. Other honors include the Jazz Heritage Award, the Kansas City Jazz Ambassador's Award of Excellence, the Elder Statesmen of Jazz Award, and lifetime achievement awards from both the Oklahoma Jazz Hall of Fame and Kansas City's CODA Jazz Fund. She was given a lifetime achievement award by the American Jazz Museum and inducted into its Walk of Fame. She has also received lifetime achievement awards from the Great American Songbook Foundation, Licia Albanese-Puccini Foundation, and the Chicago Cabaret Professionals Association. On September 18, 2012, the Native Sons and Daughters of Greater Kansas City honored Maye with the organization's Outstanding Kansas Citian Award.

== Personal life ==
Maye has been married three times. She also had one long-term partnership. At age 18, she married her first husband who was a dancer. The pair briefly moved to Florida before divorcing one year later. Maye later cited his gambling and alcohol addictions for the marriage's demise. Her second marriage was to Jimmie De Fore. Their union resulted in Maye's only child, daughter Kristi Tucker. Maye's daughter is a singer and vocal instructor in Kansas City. Tucker is employed at the Marley School of Dance in Overland Park, Kansas. Her third marriage was to Jazz performer Sammy Tucker. He adopted Maye's daughter. However, she found him abusive and their marriage also ended in divorce. Maye was involved in a long-term relationship with a man for roughly ten years. When the pair ended their relationship, Maye purposely sang "I Will Survive" on The Tonight Show and told her partner to watch the show.

== Discography ==
Studio albums

- Marilyn...the Most (1961)
- Meet Marvelous Marilyn Maye (1965)
- The Lamp Is Low (1966)
- A Taste of "Sherry!" (1967)
- Step to the Rear (1967)
- The Happiest Sound in Town (1968)
- Marilyn Maye, Girl Singer (1970)
- Marilyn Maye Sings All of Jerry Herman's "Hello Dolly" (1985)
- Rapport: Marilyn Maye and Mark Franklin Communicate (with Mark Franklin)
- Maye Sings Ray (2005)
- Super Singer – A Tribute to Johnny Carson (2005)

== Awards and nominations ==
Year	Nominee / work	Award	Result	Ref.
1966	Cashbox	Most Promising Female Vocalist	Nominated	
1966	8th Annual Grammy Awards	Best New Artist	Nominated	
1967	Cash Box	Most Promising Up & Coming Female Vocalist	Won	
1968	Cash Box	Most Programmed Female Vocalist	Nominated	
2003	Oklahoma Jazz Hall of Fame	Jay McShann Lifetime Achievement Award	Won	
2006	Kansas City Jazz Coda	Lifetime Achievement Award	Won	
2009	The Breukelein Institute	Guadium Award	Won	
2012	Chicago Cabaret Professionals	Lifetime Achievement Award	Won	
2018	Great American Songbook Foundation	New Standard Award	Won	
