= The Fighting Gamecocks Lead the Way =

Fight song at the University of South Carolina

"The Fighting Gamecocks Lead the Way" is the fight song of the University of South Carolina (USC). It was adapted from the musical number "Step to the Rear" in the Broadway show How Now, Dow Jones with new lyrics written by Gamecocks football coach Paul Dietzel.

== History ==
USC band director James Pritchard obtained a band arrangement of the Elmer Bernstein-penned song "Step to the Rear" from the Broadway musical How Now, Dow Jones in 1968, which the school marching band played at the first game of the 1968 season. It caught the ear of head football coach and athletic director Dietzel, who contacted Pritchard about possibly adapting it as a replacement for USC's original fight song, "Carolina Let Your Voices Ring" (now called the "Old Fight Song"). Dietzel wrote the lyrics for the song, but asked that he remain anonymous because knowledge that the football coach wrote the lyrics might render it unacceptable to the basketball program.

The song was officially introduced on 16 November 1968 prior to the football game against Virginia Tech and has been USC's fight song since the fall of 1969.
