= The Second of Maye =

Live album by Marilyn Maye
- Released: April 1966
- Venue: The Living Room
- Genre: Jazz; pop
- Label: RCA Victor
- Producer: Joe René

Marilyn Maye chronology
Meet Marvelous Marilyn Maye (1965)	The Second of Maye (1966)	The Lamp Is Low (1966)

The Second of Maye is a live album by American singer Marilyn Maye. It was released in April 1966 via RCA Victor and it contained 12 tracks. The project was recorded in a live format at The Living Room, a performance venue located in New York City. It was the second album of Marilyn Maye's issued by the RCA Victor label and her first live album. It was met with favorable reviews following its release.

== Background, recording and content ==
Marilyn Maye was discovered by Steve Allen, who brought her on his syndicated national television show. These appearances caught the attention of RCA Victor, which signed her to the label. Maye's first RCA album was released in 1965 titled Meet Marvelous Marilyn Maye. It was then followed by the live album The Second of Maye. The project was recorded live at The Living Room venue in New York City. The album featured the Sammy Tucker Quartet. The group's leader, Sammy Tucker, was Maye's husband at the time. It was produced by Joe René. It was Maye's second production collaboration with René who also produced her 1965 studio album.

The Second of Maye consisted of 12 tracks. It included Jazz vocal standards and musical theatre covers. Its opening track, "The Sweetest Sounds", which was composed by Richard Rodgers and first appeared in the musical No Strings. Also on the beginning of the album is a cover of the Broadway musical song "On the Street Where You Live", which Maye recorded in a Jazz style. "I'll Know" was another Broadway musical song that had first appeared in the film Guys and Dolls. "My Ship" was also covered and first featured in the Broadway musical Lady in the Dark.

== Release and critical reception ==
The Second of Maye was originally released in April 1966 by RCA Victor. It was originally distributed as a vinyl LP, sold in both mono and stereo versions. It was re-released to digital platforms which included Apple Music. Following its original release, it was given a positive review from Billboard magazine. The publication found that the project "allows the artist to display her skill as an improviser". The magazine also compared Maye's singing style to that of Ella Fitzgerald. High Fidelity magazine also praised the project, calling her an "exciting, versatile, and in the best sense, stylish singer."

== Track listing ==
Side one
No.	Title	Writer(s)	Length
1.	"The Sweetest Sounds" (from the musical production No Strings)	Richard Rodgers	2:23
2.	"It Never Entered My Mind" (from the musical production Higher and Higher)	Lorenz Hart; Rodgers	3:36
3.	"Mr. Lucky"	Evans; Livingston; Mancini	2:38
4.	"I'll Know" (from the musical production Guys and Dolls)	Arlen; Harburg	2:58
5.	"When Sunny Gets Blue"	M. Fisher; Jack Segal	3:53
6.	"On the Street Where You Live" (from the musical production My Fair Lady)	Alan Jay Lerner and Frederick Loewe	2:58

Side two
No.	Title	Writer(s)	Length
1.	"Bill Bailey"	Traditional	2:59
2.	"My Ship" (from the musical production Lady in the Dark)	I. Gershwin; K. Weill	2:41
3.	"When I'm in Love"	Steve Allen	2:22
4.	"You Will Be Loved"	Murray Grand	3:06
5.	"Won't Someone Please Belong to Me"	Bobby Troup	3:33
6.	"Everything's Made for Love"	G. Gibson; S. Schwartz	3:08

== Technical personnel ==
All credits are adapted from the liner notes of The Second of Maye.

- Mickey Crofford – Recording engineer
- Skitch Henderson – Liner notes
- Joe René – Producer
- The Sammy Tucker Quarter – Ensemble

== Release history ==
Region	Date	Format	Label	Ref.
North America	April 1966	LP Mono; LP Stereo	RCA Victor	
Japan	2000	Compact disc	RCA Vocal LP Collection	
North America	circa 2020	Music download; streaming	Sony Music Entertainment	
