= University of South Carolina School of Music =

Coordinates: 33.9960°N 81.0343°W

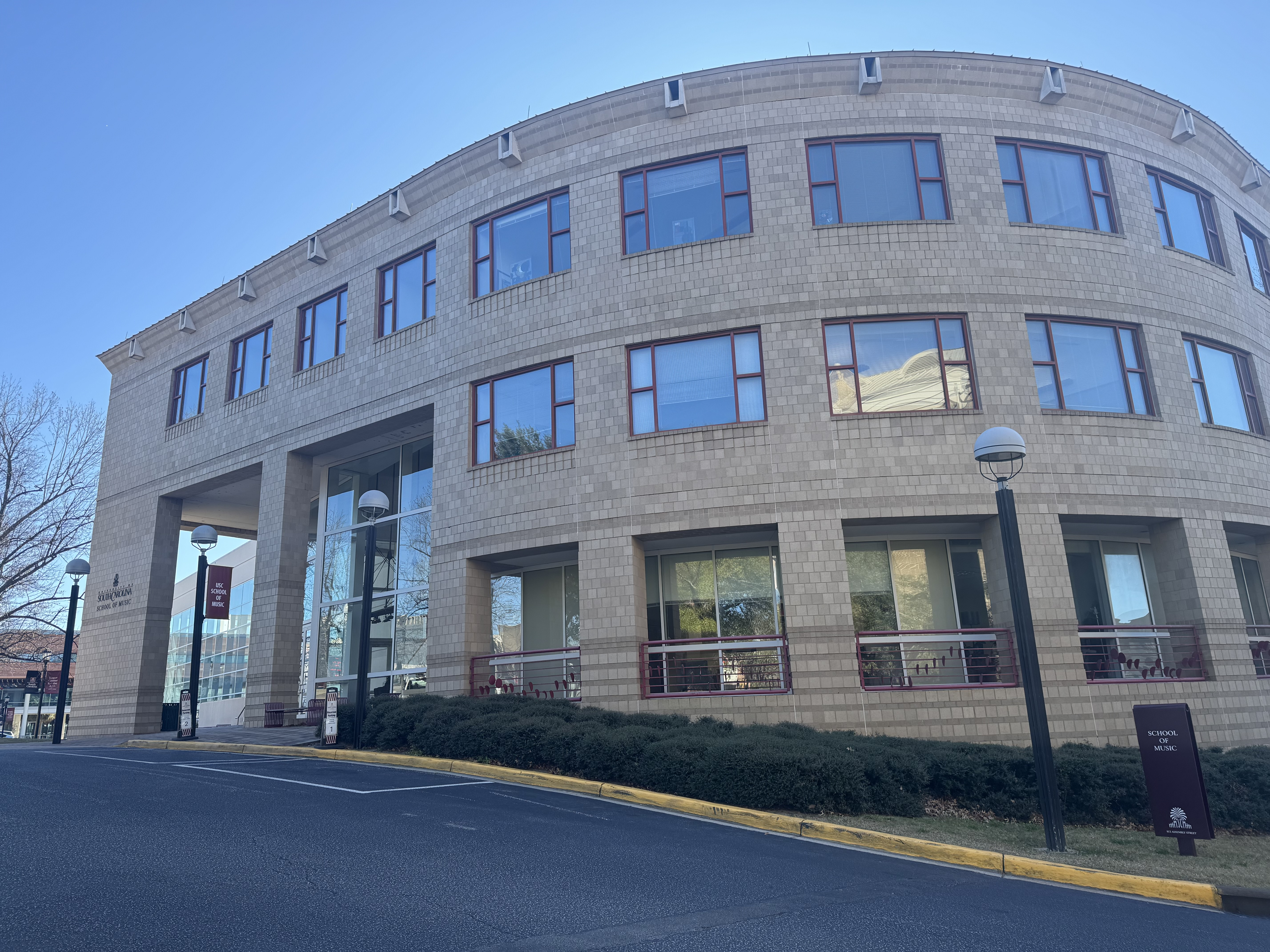
- Former name: Department of Music
- Type: Public
- Established: 1924; Chartered in 1994
- Parent institution: University of South Carolina
- Accreditation: National Association of Schools of Music
- Dean: Tayloe Harding
- Location: 813 Assembly St, Columbia, South Carolina, 29208, United States
- Website: https://sc.edu/study/colleges_schools/music/

The University of South Carolina School of Music is a collegiate music school in Columbia, South Carolina as a part of the flagship campus of the University of South Carolina (USC). The program was originally founded as the university's Department of Music in 1924, and was chartered in 1994 as the School of Music. The school is accredited by the National Association of Schools of Music. It is the largest collegiate music program in the state of South Carolina by enrollment.

== History ==
The University of South Carolina founded its Department of Music (also called the Music Department) within its College of Arts and Sciences in 1924 following a growth in interest and involvement with music at the university. This growth in interest began in the 1900s, driven largely by student-run organizations such as the glee club as well as the Carolina Band, which was student-led from its founding in 1920 until 1923, when George Olson became the first faculty member in charge of the group.

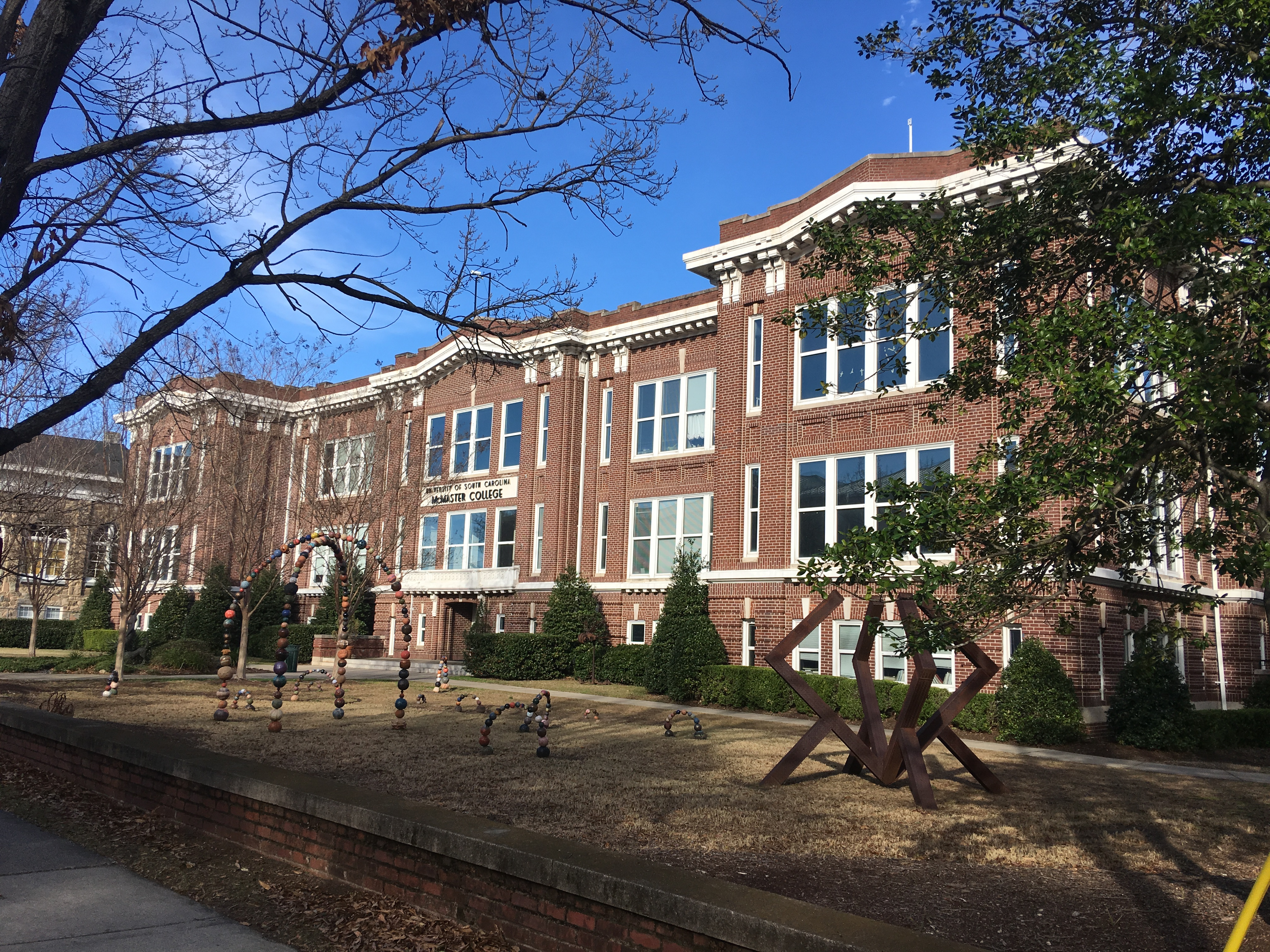
The McMaster School housed the Music Department from 1960 until it was chartered as its own academic division in 1994.

In 1960, the Music Department, along with other fine arts departments, were moved to the McMaster School, a building that previously served as an elementary school until being purchased by the university.

As the Music Department continued to grow, it became more difficult to house all activities in one building, leading to musical activities being spread across campus. Major construction projects were initiated to address these problems. A new performing arts center, the Koger Center for the Arts was opened in 1989. In 1991, the South Carolina State Legislature approved a bond bill for a new dedicated music building to be built adjacent to the Koger Center. Construction for the new building began in 1993 and was finished the next year. This coincided with the Music Department being chartered as its own academic division in 1994, becoming the University of South Carolina School of Music.

In 2020, the University of South Carolina bought the property of Greene Street United Methodist Church, diagonally across the street from the School of Music and Koger Center. The building was renovated to become the new home of the School of Music's Jazz Department and opened in the fall of 2023. On September 13th, 2024, 100 years after music was first introduced to the University, the School of Music began its year-long centennial celebration with a concert featuring its premier ensembles.

== Facilities ==
The University of South Carolina School of Music is located at 813 Assembly Street. The building consists of a basement which holds practice and rehearsal spaces, as well as three upper floors which contain classrooms and offices. The School of Music houses the university's Music Library on the second floor. This floor also houses a recital hall which has a 2-manual pipe organ.

The School of Music uses the Koger Center for the Arts, which it is directly adjacent to, for large ensemble concerts. It also uses other facilities such as Johnson Hall in the nearby School of Business, the Greene Street Church, the second floor of the Discovery Parking Garage as USC's String Project Building, and the Copenhaver Band Hall for Carolina Band rehearsals.

== Ensembles ==
The University of South Carolina has a number of musical ensembles open to all USC students, including those not majoring in music. The school has two orchestras, three concert bands, an opera, a percussion ensemble, a steelband, and multiple jazz, chamber, and choral ensembles. The School of Music has a YouTube channel where it live-streams and uploads its recitals and concerts.

The Percussion Ensemble has been invited to perform at the Percussive Arts Society International Convention (PASIC) in 2012, 2021, and 2024. The Carolina Band was invited to perform at the 2024 Macy's Thanksgiving Day Parade.

== Degree programs ==
The following degree programs are offered by the School of Music of the University of South Carolina:

- Music education (BM, MMus, MAT, PhD)
  - Piano pedagogy (MMus, DMA)
  - Violin/Viola Pedagogy (MMus)
- Music Performance (BM, MMus, DMA, Certificate) Performance Degrees and Certificates are offered for the following instruments/areas:
  - Keyboard: Piano, Organ
  - Strings: Violin, Viola, Cello, Double bass
  - Woodwind: Flute, Oboe, Bassoon, Clarinet, Saxophone
  - Brass: Trumpet, French horn, Trombone, Euphonium, Tuba
  - Percussion
  - Guitar
  - Voice
- Music Composition (BM, MMus, DMA)
- Jazz Studies (BM, MMus)
- Music theory (BM, MMus)
- Conducting (MMus, DMA)
- Music history (MMus)
- Opera (BM)
- Music Industry Studies (BS, Minor)
  - Audio Recording (Minor)
  - Music Entrepreneurship (Minor)
- Music (BA, Minor)
  - Musical Theatre (BA)

== Alumni ==
- Andy Akiho, percussionist and composer
- Andrew J. Allen, saxophonist and professor of music
- Johnny Helms, trumpet player, band leader, and music educator
- Virginia Uldrick, founder of the South Carolina Governor's School for the Arts & Humanities
- Joseph Young, orchestral conductor
- Darius Rucker, singer-songwriter (honorary doctorate in music)

== Notable faculty ==
- Fang Man, Associate Professor of Composition
- Don Gillis (1912-1978), Composer in Residence
- Tayloe Harding, Dean of the School of Music
- Clifford Leaman, Professor of Saxophone
- Mak Grgić, Assistant Professor of Guitar
- Phillip Bush, Professor of Piano and Chamber Music
- Ashley Emerson, Vocal Instructor
- James A. Hall, Distinguished Professor Emeritus
