= SEC basketball tournament =

The phrase SEC basketball tournament may refer to:

- SEC men's basketball tournament
- SEC women's basketball tournament
