= University of South Carolina Libraries =

Public academic library system of the University of South Carolina

The University of South Carolina Libraries are the public academic library system of the University of South Carolina, consisting of Thomas Cooper Library (the largest), Colemon Karesh Law Library, Ernest F. Hollings Special Collection Library, Music Library, School of Medicine Library, South Caroliniana Library, and others.

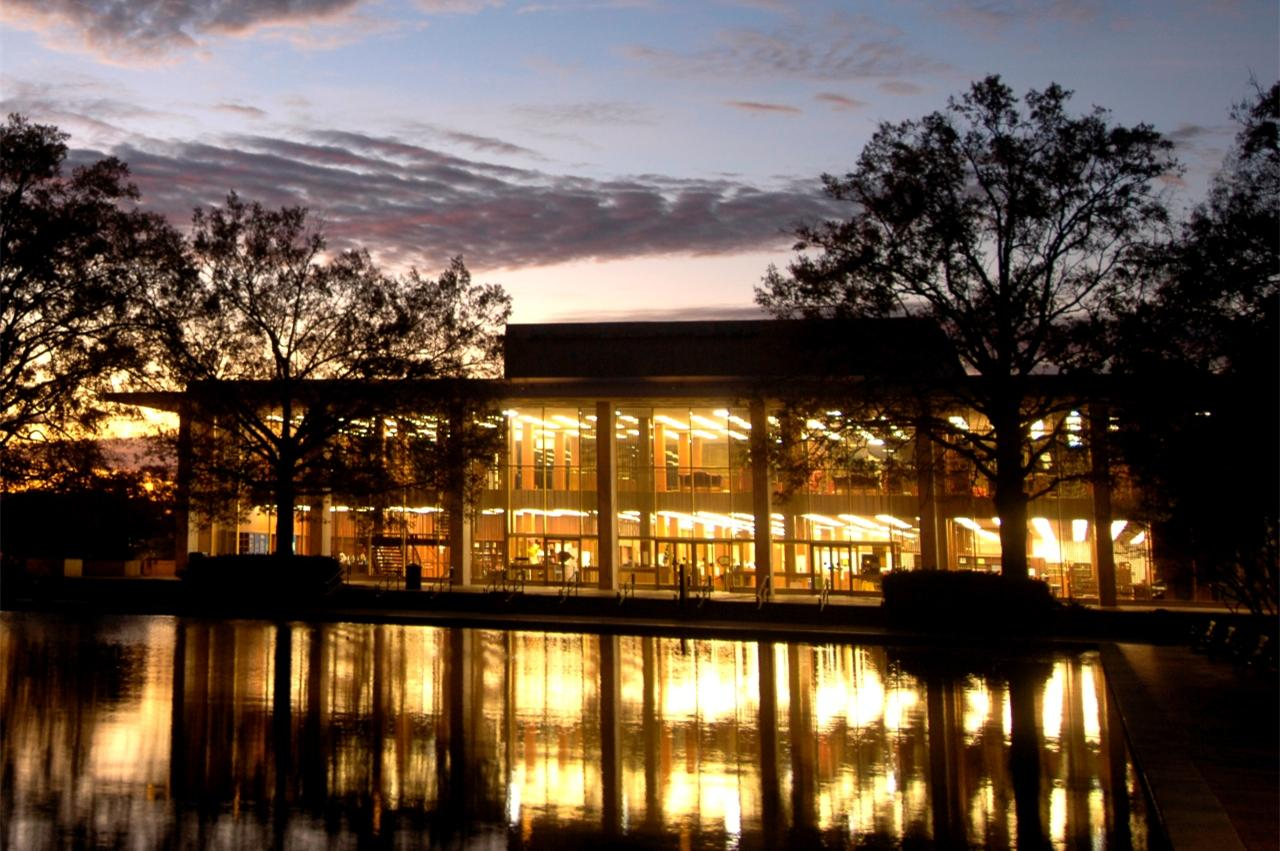
View of the Thomas Cooper Library at dusk.

In total, the library system, the largest in South Carolina, holds more than 5,679,527 book volumes, 619,459 electronic books, and a total of 8,941,910 library materials making it one of the largest libraries in North America.

== Main Library ==
=== Thomas Cooper Library ===
The Thomas Cooper Library is the university's main library, named for Thomas Cooper (1759 – 1839). The facility opened in 1959 as a dedicated undergraduate library, the first such library in the South. The building was designed by Edward Durell Stone, the designer of the Kennedy Center, and the firm of Lyles, Bissett, Carlisle, and Wolff. The building was executed in a modernist design primarily of white marble. Taking its current form in 1976, the 289,000-square-foot (26,800 m^{2}) facility houses the general collection on 45 miles (72 km) of shelves. The library consists of seven levels, four underground and three above including a mezzanine level. In addition to housing books the library contains numerous study carrels, collaboration rooms, classrooms, and computer facilities. In the Technology Lounge students can check out tech devices such as laptops and tablets as well as access specialized software. The facility is open 24/7 to students.

The library's general collection consists of items that have always been in the collection as well as items that were at one point housed in separate locations. For example, the science collection and the education collection were consolidated into the general collection from their original separate locations. The library is also home to government resources such as the Government and Maps collection which contains US federal government and European Union documents. In addition the Scholar Commons serves as an institutional repository of scholarly work. As the main research library the facility is home to numerous research resources such as journals, articles and databases, and hands-on guidance from librarians and research specialists.

The library is host to multiple centers including:

- Student Success Center
- Center for Teaching Excellence
- Digital Humanities Center
- Career Center

=== Ernest F. Hollings Special Collections Library ===
The Ernest F. Hollings Special Collections Library is located adjacent to the Thomas Cooper Library. This facility is home to the Irvin Department of Rare Books & Special Collections as well as the South Carolina Political Collections. The Rare Books Collection ranges from works on philosophy, natural history, and literature among others. The collection contains the largest collection of Robert Burns and Scottish literature materials outside Scotland, and the largest Ernest Hemingway collection in the world. In addition there are also large collections relating to Joseph Heller, Dashiell Hammett, and William Faulkner. The Core Collection consists of the original books acquired by the university at the time of its founding, two items of note are an original copy of Diderot and D'Alembert's Encyclopedie, and 30 medieval incunabula, books printed in the first century of printing.

== Other Libraries ==
=== South Caroliniana Library ===
The South Caroliniana Library is located on the university's Historic Horseshoe. Begun in 1838 and completed in 1840, the Robert Mills-designed building was the first free standing college library in the country. Mills used the reading room of the Library of Congress that housed Thomas Jefferson's collection as the basis for his design.

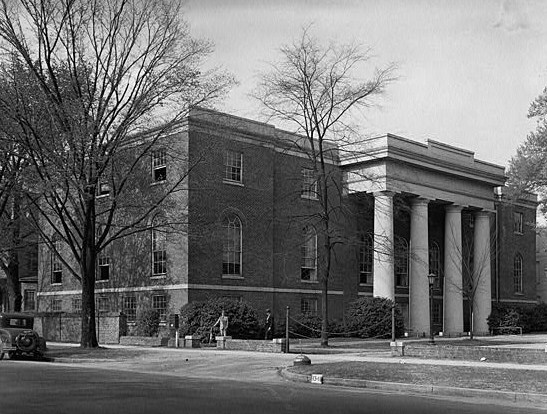
Historic photo of the South Caroliniana Library.

The library served as the university's main library until 1940 with the completion of what is now McKissick Museum. As one of the library system's special collections, the library houses items relating to the state of South Carolina and the American South in general, such as Civil War diaries, family papers, etc.

=== Special Libraries and The Library Annex ===
The University Libraries also maintains special libraries at differing locations for subjects and schools including:

- Business Library (Darla Moore School of Business)
- Coleman Karesh Law Library (Joseph F. Rice School of Law)
- Medical Library (School of Medicine–Columbia)
- Moving Image Research Collections
- Music Library (School of Music)

The Library Annex is located near the South Carolina state archives in northeast Columbia. The purpose of the annex is to house infrequently used items to alleviate crowding at the main libraries. While its primary purpose is storage there are research rooms available on site for those that need to access a large amount of materials. For purposes of conservation and maintenance of materials there is a preservation lab on site as well.
