= How Now, Dow Jones =

American musical comedy

- Original Broadway poster
- Music: Elmer Bernstein
- Lyrics: Carolyn Leigh
- Book: Max Shulman
- Productions: 1967, Broadway; 2009, FringeNYC (revised)

How Now, Dow Jones is a musical comedy by Academy Award winner Elmer Bernstein, Tony Award nominee Carolyn Leigh and Max Shulman. The original Broadway production opened in December 1967. A critically acclaimed revised version premiered off-Broadway in August 2009.

How Now, Dow Jones, set in Wall Street, follows Kate who announces the Dow Jones numbers. Her fiancé will not marry her until the Dow Jones Industrial Average hits 1,000.

== Original synopsis ==
Act I

Kate is frustrated that her engagement has gone on for three and a half years, only because Herbert has been expecting the Dow Jones average to hit the magic mark of 1000. She meets Charley, and they find that they share not only suicidal tendencies but also an attraction.

Cynthia, who recently met Wingate at a party and worships him, visits him in his office; Wingate, who is married, sets her up in an apartment as his mistress. After she leaves, Wingate and his fellow tycoons try to talk Senator McFetridge out of using an investigation of Wall Street to help his next election campaign.

After spending the night, Charley is smitten with Kate and wants them to travel the world together, but Kate turns him down, still hoping for a steady life with Herbert.

Having lured all other types of investors, Wingate now wants to convince widows and orphans to take their money out of safe bank accounts. But his customers' men don't have the kind of gawkiness that would win over old ladies. He notices Charley out on a window ledge about to jump, stops him, and finds him to be just the right kind of man for the job. Charley quickly becomes successful at charming rich widows into betting on the stock market.

Meanwhile, Kate finds out she's pregnant from her one-night stand with Charley. She loses her resolve to tell him when his childhood sweetheart Sue Ellen Bradbury and her father show up at their meeting place: now that Charley has turned out not quite the total failure Mr. Bradbury thought he was, Charley and Sue Ellen are engaged. In desperation, during her next Dow Jones update, Kate ignores the true figures given to her and announces that the Dow has reached 1000.

Act II

There is initial euphoria among investors such as the widows and Kate's doctor. But soon it is discovered that the announced figures were false. After all the tycoons eliminate each other as the perpetrators, they narrow down Kate as the suspect, but Senator McFetridge does not believe the scenario and plans to expose Wall Street corruption in a news interview. The rest try to find Kate.

Wingate visits Cynthia at her new apartment to ask if she knows where Kate is. It turns out that he has never taken advantage of their arrangement since it was first set up. He tells her that if the market crashes, the apartment will have to go. Cynthia brightens up when he asks her to come with him to stand by his side when the national panic happens.

Wingate, Cynthia, Herbert, and Charley find Kate in her apartment. Even though she lied in order to get Herbert to marry her, she really doesn't love him. The matter of her pregnancy by Charley causes Wingate nearly to faint at the thought of what this entire illicit affair would do to the image of Wall Street. Left alone, Kate and Charley resolve against suicide. Charley is determined to come up with a solution and to make a life with Kate.

At Wingate's brokerage, the bottom is about to fall out. Even the Senator is resigned to having to live off of only his congressional salary from now on. Suddenly Charley comes in with Kate and the solution to the problem: the legendary old man A.K. himself, in a wheel-chair. Wall Street respects everything A.K. does in the stock market. Doddering near the end of his one sane hour a day, A.K. is convinced by Charley to buy up all the stocks that are now up for sale and thereby save the U.S. economy.

=== Musical numbers ===
Act One

- "A-B-C
- "They Don't Make 'Em Like That Anymore"
- "Live a Little"
- "The Pleasure's About to Be Mine"
- "A Little Investigation"
- "Walk Away"
- "Gawk, Tousle, and Shucks"
- "Step to the Rear"
- "Shakespeare Lied"
- "Big Trouble"

Act Two

- "Rich Is Better"
- "Just for the Moment"
- "He's Here!"
- "The Pleasure's About to Be Mine (Reprise)"
- "That's Good Enough for Me"

== Original cast and characters ==
| Character | Broadway (1967) |
|---|---|
| Cynthia Pike | Brenda Vaccaro |
| Charley Matson | Tony Roberts |
| Kate Montgomery | Marlyn Mason |
| William Foster Wingate | Hiram Sherman |
| Senator McFetridge | Barnard Hughes |
| Mrs. Callahan | Lucie Lancaster |
| Mrs. Klein | Fran Stevens |
| Bradbury | Rex Everhart |
| Dr. Gilman | Sammy Smith |
| Mrs. Millhauser | Charlotte Jones |
| Sue Ellen | Jennifer Darling |
| Dow | Stanley Simmonds |
| Jones | Martin Ambrose |

== Productions and history ==
Before it reached Broadway, How Now, Dow Jones went through a great deal of turmoil in tryouts out of town. The original director, Arthur Penn, was fired in favor of veteran George Abbott who had never before worked with producer David Merrick. Similarly, choreographer Gillian Lynne was replaced by a young Michael Bennett, though he did not receive billing.

Several musical numbers were removed and/or rewritten. In a November 10, 1967 New York Times article, a cast member states that one song was "changed five times". Though no title was given, one suspects it was the tune titled "That's Music" a.k.a. "Music to My Ears" a.k.a. "Music to Their Ears". Regardless, it was eliminated with "Gawk, Tousle and Shucks" echoing the same sentiment.

The original Broadway production opened at the Lunt-Fontanne Theatre on December 7, 1967, and closed on June 15, 1968, after 220 performances and 19 previews. The David Merrick production was directed by George Abbott with choreography by Gillian Lynne (who was actually replaced by an uncredited Michael Bennett). The cast starred Tony Roberts, Marlyn Mason, Brenda Vaccaro and Hiram Sherman.

In August 2009, a revised version of How Now, Dow Jones was presented by UnsungMusicals at the Minetta Lane Theatre as part of the New York International Fringe Festival. The cast was led by Joseph Jefferson Award nominee Cristen Paige, Colin Hanlon and Fred Berman.

As revised by director Ben West, the new version featured three new songs that were cut from the original production: "Don't Let a Good Thing Get Away", "Where You Are" and "Touch and Go". Five other musical numbers, four major characters and the ensemble were eliminated and the show was presented in one act.

The production starred Cristen Paige, Jim Middleton, Fred Berman, Colin Hanlon, Shane Bland, Dennis O'Bannion, Elon Rutberg, and Cori Silberman, and was choreographed by Rommy Sandhu with musical direction and arrangements by Fran Minarik.

Elsewhere, one of the songs, "Step to the Rear", caught on, and gave Marilyn Maye a major hit on Billboard's Easy Listening chart, where it peaked at number two. The song was used in Lincoln-Mercury television commercials for its 1969 model year cars, and Hubert Humphrey's campaign for president in 1968. The song was adapted into the fight song of the University of South Carolina under the title "The Fighting Gamecocks Lead the Way".

The original script is full of topical and cultural references highly specific to 1968. One entire scene in the play—requiring a set, costumes and actors not used anywhere else in the production—was an elaborate parody of a then-current Dreyfus Fund commercial depicting a lion emerging from a subway to stride down Wall Street, and many jokes rely on audience's familiarity with the store Lane Bryant and The Graduate.

The play was profiled in the William Goldman book The Season: A Candid Look at Broadway. Goldman noted the play had a huge advance for a production without notable stars, which he attributed to the fact it was a musical about the stock market that was intended to be funny, and thus easier to sell to theatre party ladies. He said "The show, for all the effort, was not well received, but because of its advance sale, it ran; not long enough to make its money back, but it lasted the season. This show, with no names and a mediocre score and a premise beyond credulity, had a cool half million in the till the night it opened. Care to guess why? (The title that's why.)"

Ken Mandelbaum wrote "Was there a dumber plot in postwar musicals...? Why does everyone believe Kate's lie? Doesn't anyone on the stock-market floor realize she's lying? Why is Charley trying to kill himself at the beginning? Why was there no second act at all? Given the absurd plot, not credible for a moment, there was no way How Now, Dow Jones could ever have succeeded." He did feel there were "compensations: Vaccaro was very amusing, and her number "He's Here" was the show's highlight. "Walk Away" was a strong ballad, and "Step to the Rear," with Tony Roberts leading a group of marching Jewish widows, was the requisite showstopping production number. The score also had its share of floppo numbers, but given the show's initial idea, no score or stager could have made How Now, Dow Jones work."

== Awards and nominations ==
=== Original Broadway production ===
| Year | Award | Category | Nominee | Result |
|---|---|---|---|---|
| 1968 | Tony Award | Best Musical | | Nominated |
| 1968 | Tony Award | Best Original Score | Elmer Bernstein and Carolyn Leigh | Nominated |
| 1968 | Tony Award | Best Performance by a Leading Actor in a Musical | Anthony Roberts | Nominated |
| 1968 | Tony Award | Best Performance by a Leading Actress in a Musical | Brenda Vaccaro | Nominated |
| 1968 | Tony Award | Best Performance by a Featured Actor in a Musical | Hiram Sherman | Won |
| 1968 | Tony Award | Best Direction of a Musical | George Abbott | Nominated |

=== Original New York International Fringe Festival production ===
| Year | Award | Category | Nominee | Result |
|---|---|---|---|---|
| 2009 | FringeNYC Excellence Award | Outstanding Direction | Ben West | Nominated |

== Bibliography ==
- How Now, Dow Jones. Libretto. French's Musical Library. New York: Samuel French, Inc., 1968.
- How Now, Dow Jones. The original Broadway cast recording. RCA Stereo LP # LSO 1142. (Also on CD)
