= Sherry! =

1967 musical by James Lipton and Laurence Rosenthal

- 2004 Studio Recording
- Music: Laurence Rosenthal
- Lyrics: James Lipton
- Book: James Lipton
- Basis: George S. Kaufman-Moss Hart play The Man Who Came to Dinner
- Productions: 1967 Broadway

Sherry! is a musical with a book and lyrics by James Lipton and music by Laurence Rosenthal. The musical is based on the 1939 George S. Kaufman-Moss Hart play The Man Who Came to Dinner.

In 1967, following a short run on Broadway and poor reviews, the score to Sherry! was apparently lost, until being rediscovered at the Library of Congress more than thirty years later. A studio recording based on the rediscovered score was released in 2004.

== Production ==
Lipton and Rosenthal played several songs from the score for George S. Kaufman's widow, who approved of the show, and allowed the men to write the rest of the show on spec.

George Sanders originally was signed to play Whiteside, but when his wife, actress Benita Hume, became terminally ill with cancer, he withdrew from the project. Choreographer Ron Field was replaced by Joe Layton during the Philadelphia try-out. He took over directing as well, according to Lipton, although Morton DaCosta retained credit in the program.

George Sanders later recalled

I have a wonderful voice. People kept grabbing me and saying ‘You must do a musical.’ They told me if I was ever going to do one I’d be perfect in the Monty Woolley role. Of course it wasn’t perfect and I never should have gone near it, but I did. Then my wife became ill and I left the show before it ever got to New York. She died a year later. It was a horrid show and a horrid experience.

The production opened on Broadway at the Alvin Theatre on March 28, 1967, where it ran for 72 performances and fourteen previews. The cast included Clive Revill as Whiteside, Elizabeth Allen as Maggie, Jon Cypher as Bert, Dolores Gray as Lorraine, Eddie Lawrence as Banjo, Byron Webster as Beverly, and Cliff Hall as Dr. Bradley.

Sherry! took a gambit quite typical for musicals based on straight plays by "opening up" the story: that is, by adding scenes in locations not featured onstage in the original play. In order to "open up" The Man Who Came to Dinner (which takes place entirely in the Stanleys' living room), the show followed the film's model of including additional scenes outside the house, such as the skating rink in act I and a local bar in act II.

The show's name was reportedly chosen from a list of potential titles submitted through a contest. The working title had been "Dinner With Sherry."

== Studio recording ==
Following the show's closing, the orchestrations were packed for transport to the writers' publisher, but could not be found there later. It was believed that they had been inadvertently put on the wrong truck and, together with the sets, hauled to New Jersey and burned. More than three decades later, music producer Robert Sher discovered the trunk containing the complete score housed at the Library of Congress and contacted Lipton, who had by then achieved fame as the moderator of Bravo's Inside the Actors Studio, to propose an all-star studio recording. The result was a 2003 Angel Records 2-CD set (with cover art by Randy Souders) that was recorded in separate sessions over a period of three years, with the orchestral portions recorded in Bratislava and Prague and the vocals recorded in New York City, with extensive editing and mixing by Adam Long in St. Louis, Missouri. The recording cast includes Nathan Lane as Whiteside, Bernadette Peters as Maggie, Carol Burnett as Lorraine, Tom Wopat as Bert, Tommy Tune as Beverly, and Mike Myers as Banjo, with Lillias White, Keith David, James Lipton, Lawrence Pressman, Siobhan Fallon and Phyllis Newman in small supporting roles. The dancers include Noah Racey, who also choreographed "Putty in Your Hands" and Megan Sikora.

== Synopsis ==
Sheridan Whiteside, a pompous radio personality, terrorizes the family of Ernest W. Stanley of Mesalia, Ohio, when a slip on their icy front steps forces him to recuperate in their home at Christmas time. Whiteside commandeers the household and staff and disrupts the lives of everyone who comes within his orbit, including his private secretary Maggie Cutler, journalist-playwright Bert Jefferson, Broadway diva Lorraine Sheldon, antic Harpo Marx-like comedian Banjo, bon vivant Beverly Carlton, and absent-minded physician and aspiring memoirist Dr. Bradley.

== Original Broadway song list ==
Act I

- Turn On Your Radio
- Why Does the Whole Damn World Adore Me?
- Mesalia
- Maybe It's Time for Me
- How Can You Kiss Those Good Times Goodbye?
- With This Ring
- Sherry!
- Alas, Lorraine
- Au Revoir
- Proposal Duet
- Listen, Cosette
- Christmas Eve Broadcast

Act II

- Putty in Your Hands
- Imagine That
- Marry the Girl Myself
- Putty in Your Hands (Reprise)
- Harriet Sedley
- Au Revoir (Reprise)
- Sherry! (Reprise)

During the show's Boston tryout, the first act opened with a different version of Why Does the Whole Damn World Adore Me, and act II ended with a reprise of part of the number. Another number in act I, Crockfield, was cut prior to the show's opening on Broadway.

== Studio recording song list ==
Act I

- Why Does the Whole Damn World Adore Me? - Whiteside
- Whiteside's Prayer - Mrs. Stanley, Whiteside, Maggie, The Mesalians
- In the Very Next Moment - The Mesalians, John, Sarah, Maggie, Dr. Bradley, Whiteside
- Crockfield - Whiteside, The Cons, Maggie
- Maybe It's Time for Me - Maggie
- How Can You Kiss Those Good Times Goodbye? - Whiteside, Maggie
- With This Ring - Maggie, Bert, Whiteside, Dr. Bradley
- Sherry! - Lorraine, Whiteside
- Alas, Lorraine/Au Revoir - Beverley Carlton, Whiteside, Maggie
- The Proposal Duet/Listen, Cosette - Lorraine, Cosette
- I Always Stay at the Ritz - Beverly, The Railroad Porters
- Christmas Eve - Announcer, Quartet, Choir, Whiteside, Miss Preen, The Radio Crew, Sarah, John, Mrs. Stanley, Mr. Stanley

Act II

- Putty in Your Hands - Lorraine, Bert, Mesalia Barflies
- Imagine That - Maggie, Whiteside
- Preen Beguine - Banjo, Miss Preen, Whiteside
- Marry the Girl Myself - Whiteside, Banjo, Maggie
- Putty in Your Hands (Reprise) - Lorraine, Whiteside, Banjo
- Harriet Sedley - Whiteside, Banjo, Mr. Stanley
- Au Revoir (Reprise) - Whiteside, Maggie
- Whiteside's Prayer (Reprise) & Finale - Whiteside, Maggie, Bert, Dr. Bradley, The Mesalians

== Critical response ==
The critics were unanimous in their disapproval, finding the taut Kaufman-Hart humor of the original play was diluted by the inclusion of mediocre musical numbers that were dropped into the action rather than allowed to evolve naturally from the plot.

The Billboard review noted that the musical was "a dated and disjointed affair...Except for the title song, there is nothing in the score with a step-out potential...the music lacks a melodic flow and...lyrics are routine." However, the World Journal Tribune wrote that "On the whole, Kaufman and Hart's comedy holds its own as a play and gains some entertaining embellishments in this prevailing merry musical adaptation."

In reviewing the studio cast album, John Kenrick wrote "Musical theatre buffs will not be able to resist this star-studded recreation...Nathan Lane is delicious...Bernadette Peters is perfect...and Carol Burnett sings the hell out of the show-stopping title tune". The SF Gate review noted that "there's a delightful verve to the whole proceedings."
