= Step to the Rear (1967 song) =

Song from the musical How Now, Dow Jones

Song by Anthony Roberts and Charlotte Jones

from the album How Now, Dow Jones: The Original Broadway Cast Recording
- Released: 1968
- Genre: Stage and screen
- Length: 4:15
- Label: RCA Victor
- Songwriters: Elmer Bernstein; Carolyn Leigh
- Producers: George R. Marek; Andy Wiswell

"Step to the Rear" is a song written by Elmer Bernstein and Carolyn Leigh. It was originally performed in the Broadway musical How Now, Dow Jones between 1967 and 1968. It was first recorded on an official cast album in 1968. It was notably recorded by American singer Marilyn Maye, whose version was released as a single. Maye's version reached the top five of the American adult contemporary chart and was seen on televised advertisements for Lincoln and Mercury cars. It was adapted into the University of South Carolina’s fight song as The Fighting Gamecocks Lead the Way.

The song was also covered by Bing Crosby (recorded October 31, 1967) and by Teresa Brewer in 1968.

== Background and original recording ==
"Step to the Rear" was composed by Elmer Bernstein and Carolyn Leigh for the musical How Now, Dow Jones. In the show, the context of the song is centered on several widows who comfort a man who attempts suicide. When the widows discover the man lacks confidence in himself, they proceed by performing "Step to the Rear". In the original 1968 show, "Step to the Rear" was performed by Tony Roberts and Charlotte Jones. The pair recorded it on the show's cast album in 1968, which was released by RCA Victor. The show opened on Broadway on December 7, 1967, but only ran for several months.

== Marilyn Maye version ==
"Step to the Rear"
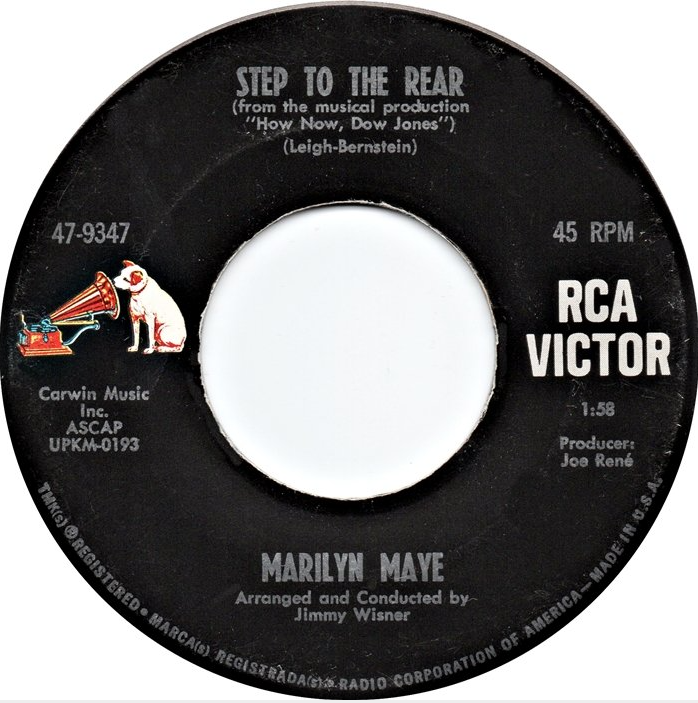

Single by Marilyn Maye

from the album Step to the Rear
- B-side: "For Those in Love"
- Released: October 1967
- Studio: RCA Studio, New York
- Length: 1:58
- Label: RCA Victor
- Songwriters: Elmer Berstein; Carolyn Leigh
- Producer: Joe René

Marilyn Maye singles chronology
"When We All Get Together" (1967)	"Step to the Rear" (1967)	"Till You Come Back" (1968)

=== Background and recording ===
"Step to the Rear" was notably recorded by American singer Marilyn Maye. Signed to RCA Victor as a recording artist, Maye was becoming known for recording versions of songs from Broadway musicals. Producer Joe René routinely brought her songs that would later be recorded for Broadway productions. This included her version of "Cabaret", which became a commercial success. She would also be given "Step to the Rear" during this period. With René serving as her producer, "Step to the Rear" was recorded in 1967 at RCA Studios in New York City.

=== Release, chart performance and reception ===
"Step to the Rear" was released as a single by RCA Victor in October 1967. It was backed on the B-side by the song "For Those in Love". It entered America's Billboard adult contemporary chart in November 1967 and spent a total of 13 weeks there. In January 1968, the song reached the number two position on the chart. The single had topped the Record World Top Non-Rock charts as well. It became Maye's highest-charting single and most commercially successful in her recording career. It was among three of her songs that reached the top ten on the adult contemporary chart. In November 1967, "Step to the Rear" appeared on her studio album of the same name.

Maye's version of "Step to the Rear" was subsequently heard by the Ford Motor Company, which used the song for several years in advertisements for their Lincoln and Mercury cars. Maye became the spokesperson for the car company and re-recorded the song with lyrics to match the advertisements on television.

=== Track listing ===
7" vinyl single

- "Step to the Rear" – 1:58
- "For Those in Love" – 2:40

=== Charts ===
Weekly chart performance for "Step to the Rear"
Chart (1967–1968)	Peak position
US Adult Contemporary (Billboard)	2
US Record World Top Non-Rock	1
