= Meet Marvelous Marilyn Maye =

Studio album by Marilyn Maye
- Released: August 1965
- Recorded: 1965
- Venue: Webster Hall
- Genre: Jazz; pop
- Label: RCA Victor
- Producer: Joe René

Marilyn Maye chronology
Marilyn...the Most (1961)	Meet Marvelous Marilyn Maye (1965)	The Second of Maye (1966)

Meet Marvelous Marilyn Maye is a studio album by American singer Marilyn Maye. It was released in August 1965 via RCA Victor and contained 12 tracks. It was the second album of Maye's career and her first with the RCA label. It contained songs from musicals and also featured covers of jazz vocal standards. It was reviewed positively by Billboard magazine following its release in 1965.

== Background ==
Marilyn Maye was performing in nightclubs throughout the Midwest United States. In 1961, she recorded her debut studio album titled Marilyn...the Most, which attracted the attention of Steve Allen. Exposure on his nationally syndicated television show brought her to the attention of RCA Victor. Maye then signed a recording contract with the label. Maye recorded several albums with the RCA label between 1965 and 1970. Her debut album with the label was issued in 1965 called Meet Marvelous Marilyn Maye.

== Recording and content ==
Meet Marvelous Marilyn Maye was recorded in 1965 at Webster Hall, a performing venue and nightclub in New York City. Although not recorded at an official studio, the project was not recorded as a live project. Instead, the album was given arrangements and recording procedures that would categorize it as a studio recording. The project was produced by Joe René, with arrangements by Don Costa and Manny Albam. The liner notes were written by Steve Allen, who concluded by calling it "the best damned vocal album of 1965".

Meet Marvelous Marilyn Maye consisted of 12 tracks. It included several covers of musical theatre songs, opening with "Get Me to the Church on Time". The song originally appeared in the Broadway musical My Fair Lady. Also included was the title song from the musical Hello, Dolly!. "I Love You Today" was a song that originally appeared in an eight-show musical about the life of Sophie Tucker called Sophie. "Happiness Is a Thing Called Joe" had originally appeared in the film Cabin in the Sky. Other tracks were covers of Jazz songs, such as "Take Five", which originally had been successful for Dave Brubeck. It also featured a cover of "Misty", which had been a commercial success for Johnny Mathis. Other Jazz and theater covers included "The Song Is You", "Put On a Happy Face", "Make Someone Happy", "Washington Square" and "Where Are You".

== Release, reception and promotion ==
Meet Marvelous Marilyn Maye was originally released in August 1965 on RCA Victor. It was offered as a vinyl LP in both mono and stereo formats. Six songs appeared on either side of the record. It was her first album with RCA Victor and second studio album in her career. It has since been re-released digitally to retailers that include Apple Music. According to an article from Billboard magazine, Meet Marvelous Marilyn Maye was given regular promotion from RCA Victor shortly after its release. This included a performance at The Living Room venue in New York City, where Maye performed the entire album track listing.

After its original release, Billboard magazine highlighted the album as a "Pop Special Merit" pick. The publication described Maye as "a talented girl who will be heard from". Will Friedwald of the book The Great Jazz and Pop Vocal Albums praised the project by saying, "Nearly every other aspect of her work is already in place here in 1965." Friedwalkd further highlighted Maye's vocal delivery and found her to be a seasoned Jazz vocalist by the time of the album's release.

== Track listing ==
Side one
No.	Title	Writer(s)	Length
1.	"Get Me to the Church on Time" (from the musical production of My Fair Lady)	Loewe; Lerner	2:35
2.	"Misty"	Johnny Burke; Erroll Garner	3:27
3.	"Washington Square"	Bob Goldstein	3:25
4.	"Happiness Is Just a Thing Called Joe"	Arlen; Harburg	3:41
5.	"I Love You Today"	Steve Allen	3:11
6.	"Hello, Dolly" (from the musical production of Hello, Dolly!)	Jerry Herman	3:50

Side two
No.	Title	Writer(s)	Length
1.	"Take Five"	Brubeck; Desmond	2:24
2.	"Where Are You"	Adamson; McHugh	2:57
3.	"Night of My Nights"	Wright; Forrest	2:26
4.	"Put on a Happy Face"	Adams; Strouse	2:31
5.	"Make Someone Happy"	Comden; Green; Styne	3:16
6.	"The Song Is You"	Hammerstein; Kern	2:10

== Technical personnel ==
All credits are adapted from the liner notes of Meet Marvelous Marilyn Maye.

- Steve Allen – Liner notes
- Manny Albam – Arranger
- Don Costa – Arranger
- Mickey Crofford – Recording engineer
- Joe René – Producer

== Release history ==
Region	Date	Format	Label	Ref.
North America	August 1965	LP Mono; LP Stereo	RCA Victor	
Japan	1991	Compact disc	Forever Vocal; RCA	
North America	circa 2020	Music download; streaming	Sony Music Entertainment	
