= Cabaret (Cabaret song) =

Song by Kander and Ebb; from the 1966 musical Cabaret

"Cabaret" is a song from the 1966 musical of the same name sung by the character Sally Bowles. It was composed by John Kander with lyrics by Fred Ebb.

== Background ==
In the musical, the song is performed by the character Sally Bowles in a night club setting in Weimar Germany in 1931. Her lover has told her that he is taking her back to America so that they can raise their baby together in safety. Sally protests as she thinks their life in Berlin is wonderful and she states politics have nothing to do with them or their affairs. After a heated row, Sally goes on stage singing “Cabaret” (“life is a cabaret, old chum”), thus confirming her decision to live in carefree ignorance of the impending problems in Germany.

The version of the song used in the musical includes a verse beginning:

"I used to have a girlfriend known as Elsie
With whom I shared
Four sordid rooms in Chelsea..."

The verse goes on to describe her friend's prostitution, alcoholism and early death. This section is often omitted in commercial recordings of the song by other artists, for example in the recording by Louis Armstrong.

== Synopsis ==
A review by Robert Feldberg on NorthJersey.com explains Michelle Williams' interpretation of the song in the 2014 Broadway revival in relation to the musical's plot:

Urging us to "come to the cabaret," it’s not with joy or defiance, but (as Natasha Richardson also performed it in 1998) with increasing fear and sorrow. Unable to summon the strength to alter the course of her life, she breaks down.

== Critical reception ==
AllMusic wrote that the 1972 film "contains some definitive [Liza] Minnelli performances, particularly her rendition of the title song".

Reviews of the 2014 Broadway revival included: The Guardian described the song as "the hardest scene in the show, so shopworn as to have long ago collapsed into kitsch". Broadway World wrote Michelle Williams's "version of the title song has a wrenching, dead-eyed quality that hauntingly undercuts its light lyrics". It has been described as "stirring" and "jaunty".

== Notable recordings ==
- Louis Armstrong (1966) - Armstrong's version was released together with "What a Wonderful World" in the UK, which reached No. 1 on the chart. "Cabaret" is listed together with "What a Wonderful World" in the chart.
- Frankie Vaughan (1966)
- Ray Conniff recorded the song in 1967, it bubbled under the Hot 100, reaching No 18, and reached No. 13 on the AC chart. Later it was included in his This Is My Song album.
- Steve Lawrence and Eydie Gormé - for their 1967 album Steve & Eydie – Together On Broadway
- Mamie Van Doren (1967)
- Brenda Lee - for the album For the First Time (1968)
- Max Bygraves (1968)
- Judi Dench (includes the 'Elsie' verse) - for the London cast recording (1968).
- Ella Fitzgerald - included in the 'live' album Ella in Budapest (1970)
- Liza Minnelli (includes the 'Elsie' verse) - for the film's soundtrack (1972), and for numerous other recordings, including Liza with a Z (1972), Liza Minnelli Live at the Winter Garden (1974), and Liza Minnelli at Carnegie Hall (1987). (On the latter recording, Minnelli added one word to the "Elsie" verse, emphasizing her own recent sobriety.)
- Vikki Carr (1972)
- Mantovani - included in the album An Evening with Mantovani (1973)
- Bing Crosby - included in his album At My Time of Life (1976)
- Russ Conway included in the album Russ Conway Presents 24 Piano Greats (1977)
- Me First and the Gimme Gimmes on their album Are a Drag (1999)
- Ashleigh Murray for the Riverdale third season soundtrack (2019)
- Thea Gilmore for her covers album These Quiet Friends (2025)

== Chart history ==
Marilyn Maye

Chart (1966)	Peak position
U.S. Billboard Easy Listening	9

Mike Douglas

Chart (1966)	Peak position
U.S. Billboard Bubbling Under the Hot 100	129
U.S. Billboard Easy Listening	25

Ray Conniff

Chart (1967)	Peak position
U.S. Billboard Bubbling Under the Hot 100	118
U.S. Billboard Easy Listening	13

Herb Alpert

Chart (1968)	Peak position
Canada RPM Top Singles	82
U.S. Billboard Hot 100	72
U.S. Billboard Easy Listening	13
U.S. Cash Box Top 100	96
