= Multimedia =

Content using a combination of forms

Examples of individual content forms that can be combined in multimedia

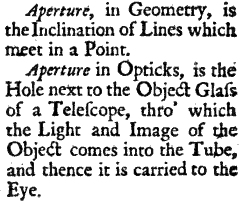

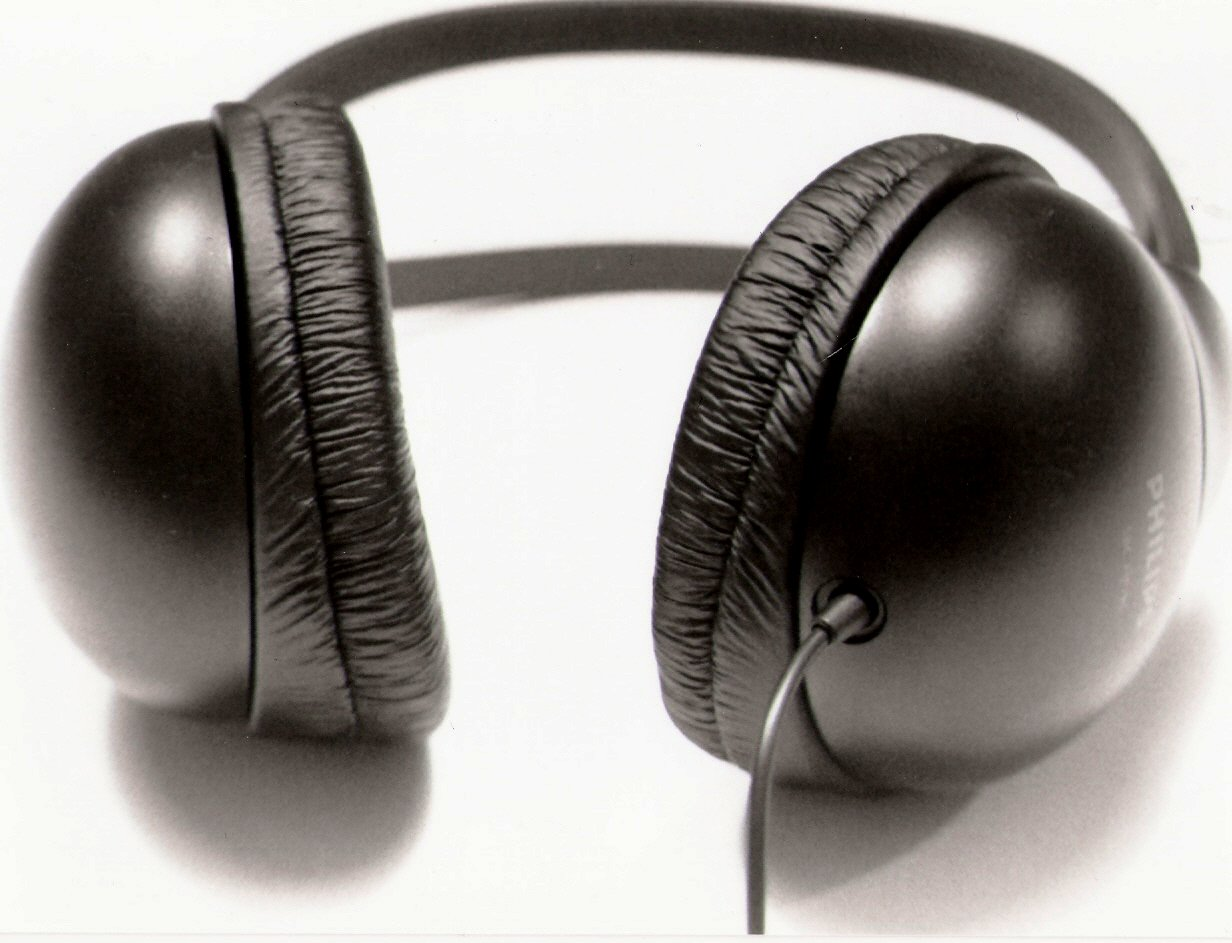

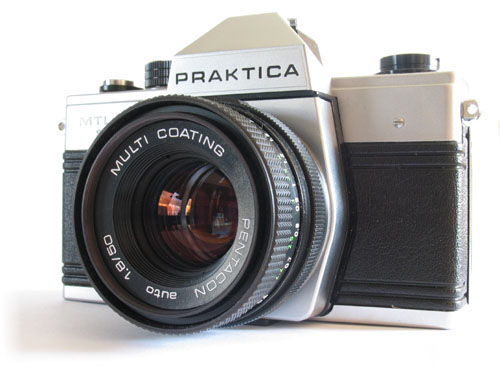

Text
Audio
Images

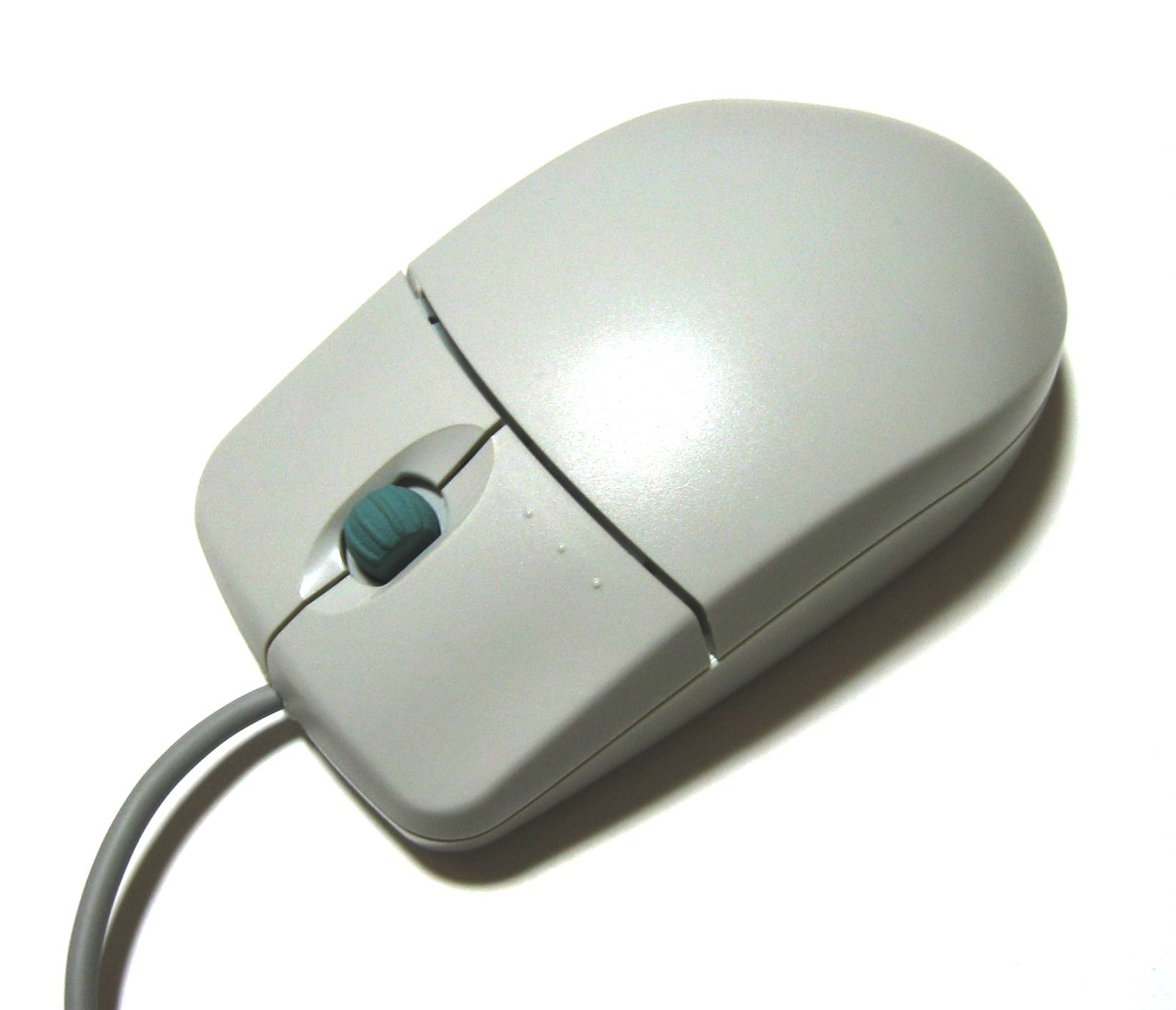

Animation
Footage
Interactivity

Multimedia is a form of communication that uses a combination of different content forms. These include writing, audio, images, animations, or video, into a single presentation. This is in contrast to traditional mass media, such as printed material or audio recordings, which only feature one form of media content. Examples of multimedia include video podcasts, audio slideshows, and animated videos. Creating multimedia content involves the application of the principles of effective interactive communication. The five main building blocks of multimedia are text, image, audio, video, and animation.

Multimedia encompasses various types of content, each serving different purposes:

- Text - Fundamental to multimedia, providing context and information.
- Audio - Includes music, sound effects, and voiceovers that enhance the overall experience. Recent developments include spatial audio and advanced sound design.
- Images - Static visual content, such as photographs and illustrations. Advances include high-resolution and 3D imaging technologies.
- Video - Moving images that convey dynamic content. High-definition (HD), 4K, and 360-degree video are recent innovations enhancing viewer engagement.
- Animation - the technique of creating moving images from still pictures, often used in films, television, and video games to bring characters and stories to life.
- Generation - the technique of creating media using algorithmic or artificial intelligence systems. This includes text, images, audio, video, or animations created through artificial intelligence, in response to user input.

Multimedia can be recorded for playback on computers, laptops, smartphones, and other electronic devices. In the early years of multimedia, the term "rich media" was synonymous with interactive multimedia. Over time, hypermedia extensions brought multimedia to the World Wide Web, and streaming services became more common.

== Terminology ==
The term multimedia was originally coined by singer and artist Bob Goldstein (later 'Bobb Goldsteinn') to promote the July 1966 opening of his "Lightworks at L'Oursin" show in Southampton, New York, Long Island. Goldstein was perhaps aware of an American artist named Dick Higgins, who had previously discussed a new approach to art-making which he called "intermedia".

On August 10, 1966, Richard Albarino of Variety borrowed the terminology, reporting: "Brainchild of song scribe-comic Bob ('Washington Square') Goldstein, the 'Lightworks' is the latest multi-media music-cum-visuals to debut as discothèque fare." Two years later, in 1968, the term "multimedia" was re-appropriated to describe the work of a political consultant, David Sawyer, husband of Iris Sawyer—one of Goldstein's producers at L'Oursin.

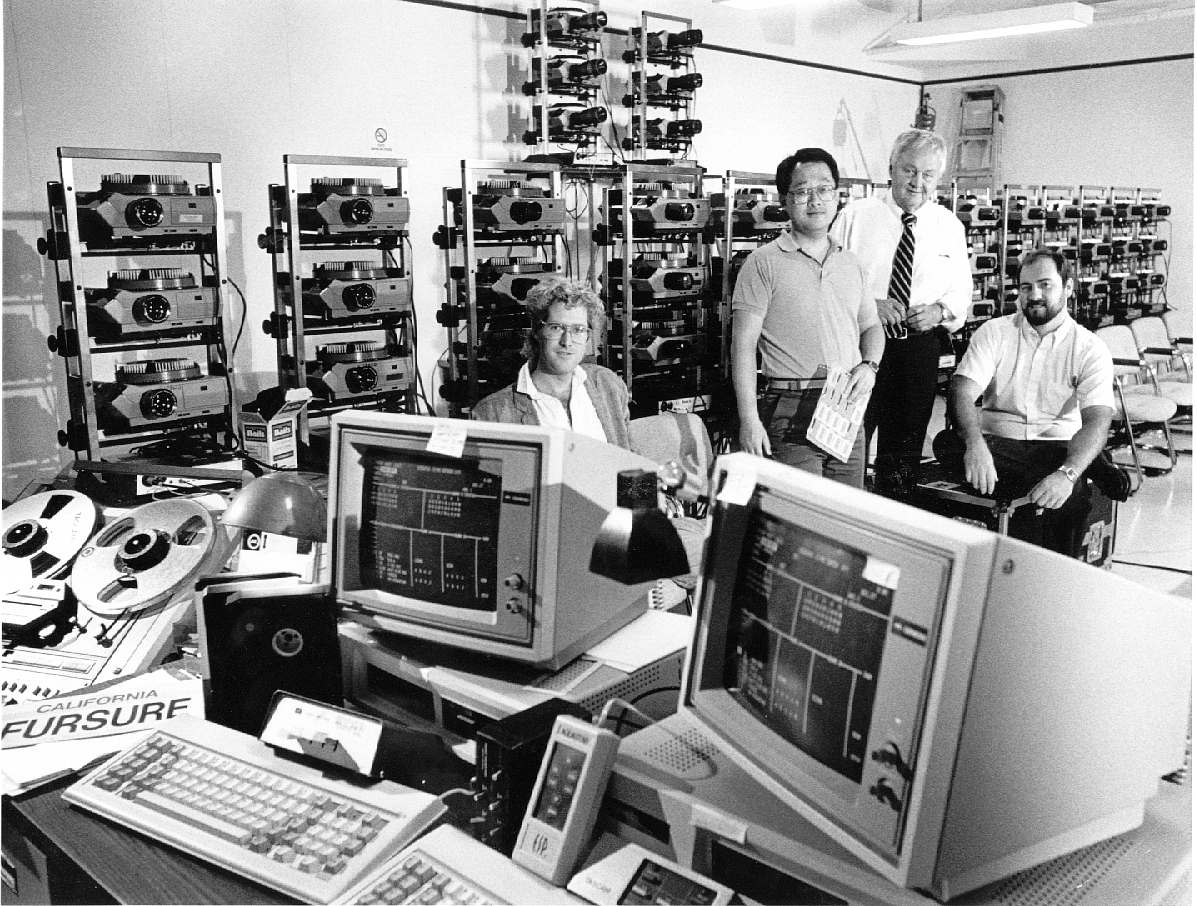
Multimedia (multi-image) setup for the 1988 Ford New Car Announcement Show, August 1987, Detroit, MI.

In the intervening forty years, the word has taken on different meanings. In the late 1970s, the term referred to presentations consisting of multi-projector slide shows timed to an audio track. However, by the 1990s, 'multimedia' had taken on its current meaning.

In the 1993 first edition of Multimedia: Making It Work, by Tay Vaughan, this book contained the Tempra Show software. This was a later, rebranded version of the 1985 DOS multimedia software VirtulVideo Producer, about which the Smithsonian declared, "It is one of the first, if not the first, multi-media authoring systems on the market."

The German language society Gesellschaft für deutsche Sprache recognized the word's significance and ubiquity in the 1990s by awarding it the title of German 'Word of the Year' in 1995.

In common usage, multimedia refers to the usage of multiple media of communication, including video, still images, animation, audio, and text, in such a way that they can be accessed interactively. Video, still images, animation, audio, and written text are the building blocks on which multimedia takes shape. In the 1990s, some computers were called "multimedia computers" because they represented the advances in graphical and audio quality, such as the Amiga 1000, which could produce up to 4096 colors (12-bit color), outputs for TVs and VCRs, and four-voice stereo audio. Changes in removable storage technology during this time were also important, as the standard CD-ROM can hold on average 700 megabytes of data, while the maximum size a 3.5-inch floppy disk can hold is 2.8 megabytes, with an average of 1.44 megabytes. Greater storage allowed for larger digital media files and therefore more complex multimedia.

The term "video", if not used exclusively to describe motion photography, is ambiguous in multimedia terminology. Video is often used to describe the file format, delivery format, or presentation format instead of "footage" which is used to distinguish motion photography from "animation" of rendered motion imagery. Multiple forms of information content are often not considered modern forms of presentation, such as audio or video. Likewise, single forms of information content with single methods of information processing (e.g., non-interactive audio) are often called multimedia, perhaps to distinguish static media from active media. In the fine arts, for example, Leda Luss Luyken's ModulArt brings two key elements of musical composition and film into the world of painting: variation of a theme and movement of and within a picture, making ModulArt an interactive multimedia form of art. Performing arts may also be considered multimedia, considering that performers and props are multiple forms of both content and media.

In modern times, a multimedia device can be referred to as an electronic device, such as a smartphone, a video game system, or a computer. Each and every one of these devices has a main function but also has other uses beyond their intended purpose, such as reading, writing, recording video and audio, listening to music, and playing video games. This has led them to be called "multimedia devices." While previous media was always local, many are now handled through web-based solutions, particularly streaming.

== Major characteristics ==
Multimedia presentations are presentations featuring in multiple types of media. These different types of media convey information to their target audience and effectively communicate with them. Videos can be used in multimedia presentations to illustrate the presenter's ideas. They are commonly used among education and many other industries to benefit students and workers, as they effectively retain chunks of information in a limited amount of time and can be stored easily. Another example is charts and graphs, as the presenters can show their audience the trends using data associated with their researches. This provides the audience a visual idea of a company's capabilities and performances. Audio also helps people understand the message being presented, as most modern videos are combined with audio to increase its efficiency, while animations are made to simplify things from the presenter's perspective. These technological methods allow efficient communication and understanding across a wide range of audiences (with an even wider range of abilities) throughout different fields.

Multimedia games and simulations may be used in a physical environment with special effects, with multiple users in an online network, or locally with an offline computer, game system, simulator, virtual reality, or augmented reality.

The various formats of technological or digital multimedia may be intended to enhance the users' experience, for example, to make it easier and faster to convey information. Or in entertainment or art, combine an array of artistic insights that include elements from different art forms to engage, inspire, or captivate an audience.

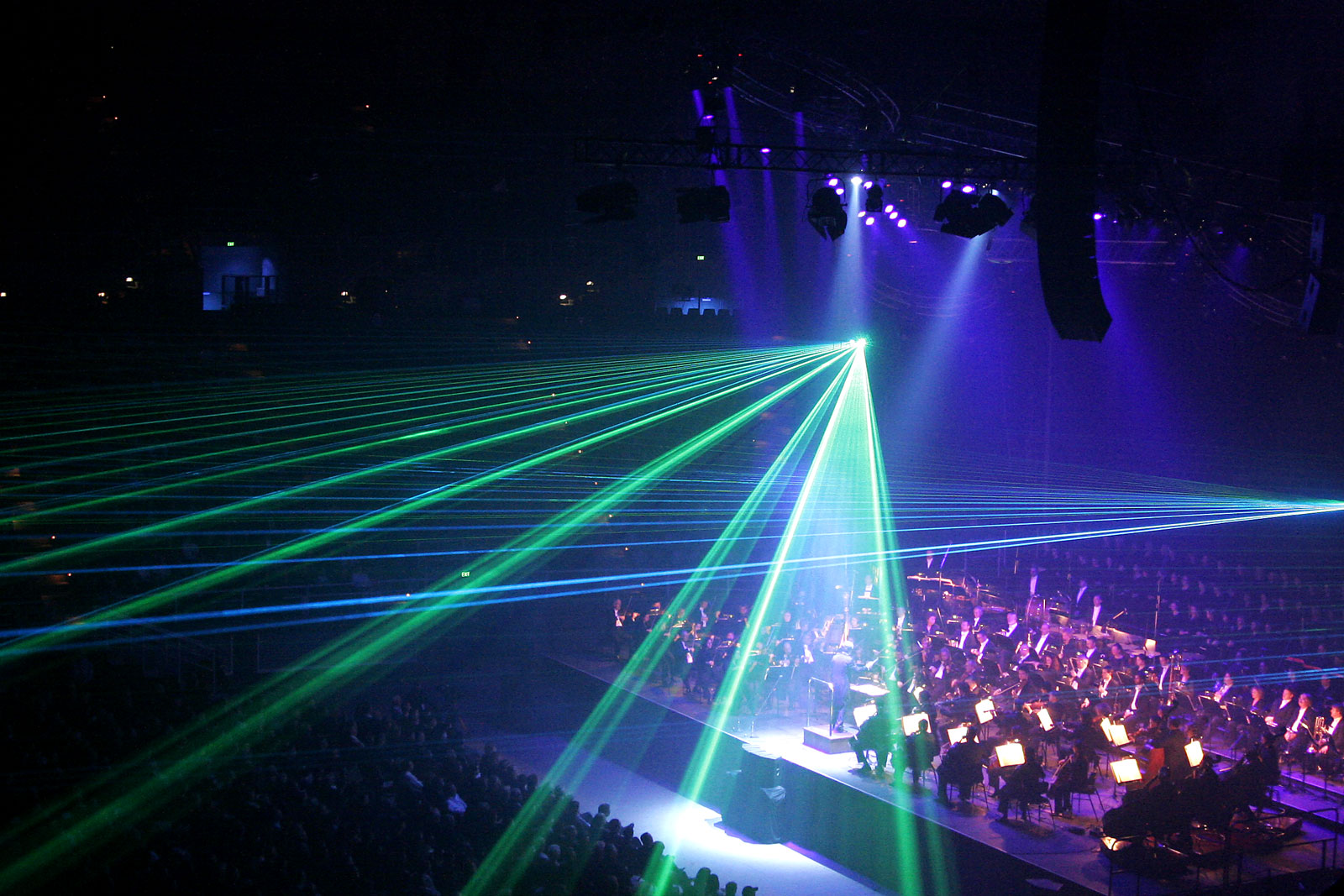
A lasershow is a live multimedia performance.

Enhanced levels of interactivity are made possible by combining multiple forms of media content. Online multimedia is increasingly becoming more and more object-oriented and data-driven, enabling applications with collaborative end-user innovation and personalization on multiple forms of content over time. Examples of these range from multiple forms of content on Web sites like photo galleries with both images (pictures) and titles (text) user-updated to simulations whose coefficients, events, illustrations, animations, or videos are modifiable, allowing the multimedia "experience" to be altered without reprogramming. In addition to seeing and hearing, haptic technology enables virtual objects to be felt. Emerging technology involving illusions of taste and smell may also enhance the multimedia experience.

== Categorization ==
Multimedia can be broadly divided into linear and non-linear categories:

- Linear active content progresses often without any navigational control, only focusing on the user to watch the entire piece by involving higher levels of emotional and sensory stimulation based on what's being shown as a cinema presentation;
- Non-linear uses interactivity to control progress as with a video game or self-paced computer-based training so that the actions made will be based on how the user interacts within the simulated world. Hypermedia is an example of non-linear content.

Multimedia presentations can be live or recorded:

- A recorded presentation may allow interactivity via a navigation system;
- A live multimedia presentation may allow interactivity via an interaction with the presenter or performer.

== Uses ==
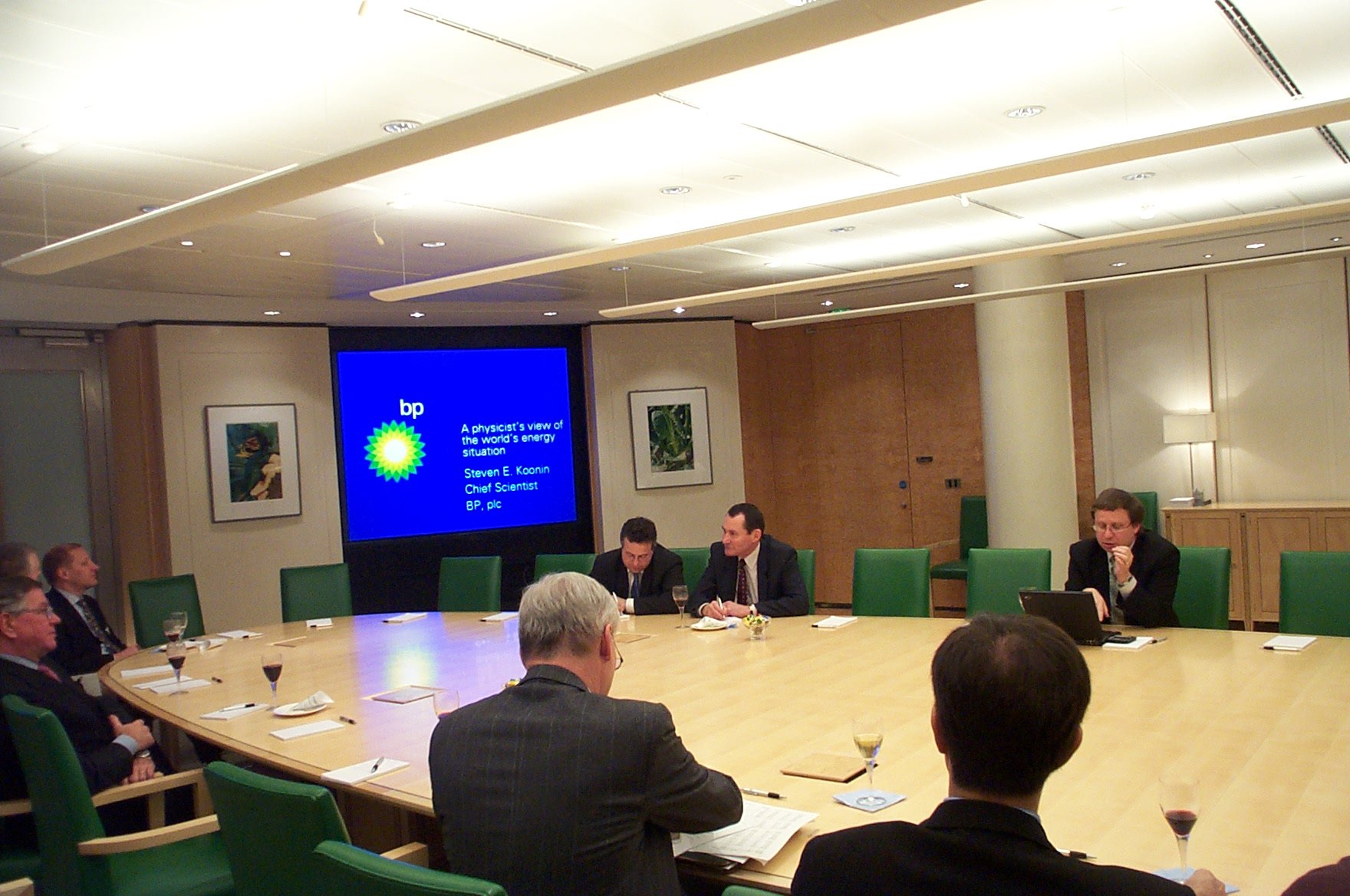
A presentation using PowerPoint. Corporate presentations may combine all forms of media content.

Multimedia finds its application in various areas, including, but not limited to, advertisements, art, education, entertainment, engineering, medicine, mathematics, business, scientific research, and spatial temporal applications. Several examples are as follows:

=== Creative industries ===
Creative industries use multimedia for a variety of purposes. These include fine arts, entertainment, commercial art, journalism, to media and software services provided for any of the industries listed below. Requests for their skills range from technical to analytical to creative. Interactive multimedia is used in various forms of online creative work.

=== Commercial uses ===
Commercialization and marketing of products by companies in the modern day rely on increasingly more advanced displays of Interactive Multimedia for sophisticated tactics and customer retention. Advertising companies rely heavily on social interfaces and television to promote products, while ads and websites that utilize pop-ups need their shorter, more concise methods to be as efficient and pleasing to the potential customers as possible. Using these platforms, they are able to express their message or persuade a targeted audience. External and internal office communications are often developed by hired creative service firms for advanced displays of information in a variety of necessary situations. Examples range from as common as holding more engaging presentations to providing trainees or new workers with more effective media to educate on a company's policies. Commercial multimedia developers may be hired to design for governmental services and nonprofit service applications as well, which often takes the form of the campaigning websites and commercials pushed out to the public. In addition, the prominence of data mining within multimedia platforms in order to adjust marketing techniques based on the data they mine is a crucial and notable practice of commercial advertisement to efficiently understand the demographic of a target audience. In recent years, a new trend of multimedia has arrived: a new sort of digital billboard placed on the side of buildings and usually wrapped around the side of them. These clips are made at differing angles to trick the brain into seeing them as 3-dimensional, like they're leaving the billboard entirely. These displays are designed to attract attention for advertising purposes.

=== Entertainment and fine arts ===
Multimedia is heavily used in the entertainment industry, especially to develop special effects in movies and animations (VFX, 3D animation, etc.). Multimedia games are a popular pastime and are software programs available either as CD-ROMs or online. Video games are considered multimedia, as they meld animation, audio, and interactivity to give the player an immersive experience. While video games can vary in terms of animation style or audio type, the element of interactivity makes them a striking example of interactive multimedia. Interactive multimedia refers to multimedia applications that allow users to actively participate instead of just sitting by as passive recipients of information.

In the arts, there are multimedia artists who blend techniques using different media that in some way incorporate interaction with the viewer. Another approach entails the creation of multimedia that can be displayed in a traditional fine arts arena, such as an art gallery. Video has become an intrinsic part of many concerts and theatrical productions in the modern era and has spawned content creation opportunities for many media professionals. Although multimedia display material may be volatile, the survivability of the content is as strong as any traditional medium.

=== Social media ===
Social media platforms are platforms heavily based around the spread of multimedia in a social environment. The text and images on posts or in messages, the audio of voice recordings or in the background of videos, and the animations and videos posted are all forms of multimedia which social media platforms facilitate the spread and viewing of for its users.

=== Education ===
In education, multimedia is used to produce computer-based training courses (popularly called CBTs) and reference books like encyclopedias and almanacs. A CBT lets the user go through a series of presentations, text about a particular topic, and associated illustrations in various information formats.

Learning theory in the past decade has expanded dramatically because of the introduction of multimedia. Several lines of research have evolved, e.g., cognitive load and multimedia learning.

From multimedia learning (MML) theory, David Roberts has developed a large group lecture practice using PowerPoint and based on the use of full-slide images in conjunction with a reduction of visible text (all text can be placed in the notes view' section of PowerPoint). The method has been applied and evaluated in 9 disciplines. In each experiment, students' engagement and active learning have been approximately 66% greater than with the same material being delivered using bullet points, text, and speech, corroborating a range of theories presented by multimedia learning scholars like Sweller and Mayer. The idea of media convergence is also becoming a major factor in education, particularly higher education. Defined as separate technologies such as voice (and telephony features), data (and productivity applications), and video that now share resources and interact with each other, media convergence is rapidly changing the curriculum in universities all over the world. Higher education has been implementing the use of social media applications such as Twitter, YouTube, Facebook, etc. to increase student collaboration and develop new processes in how information can be conveyed to students.

==== Educational technology ====
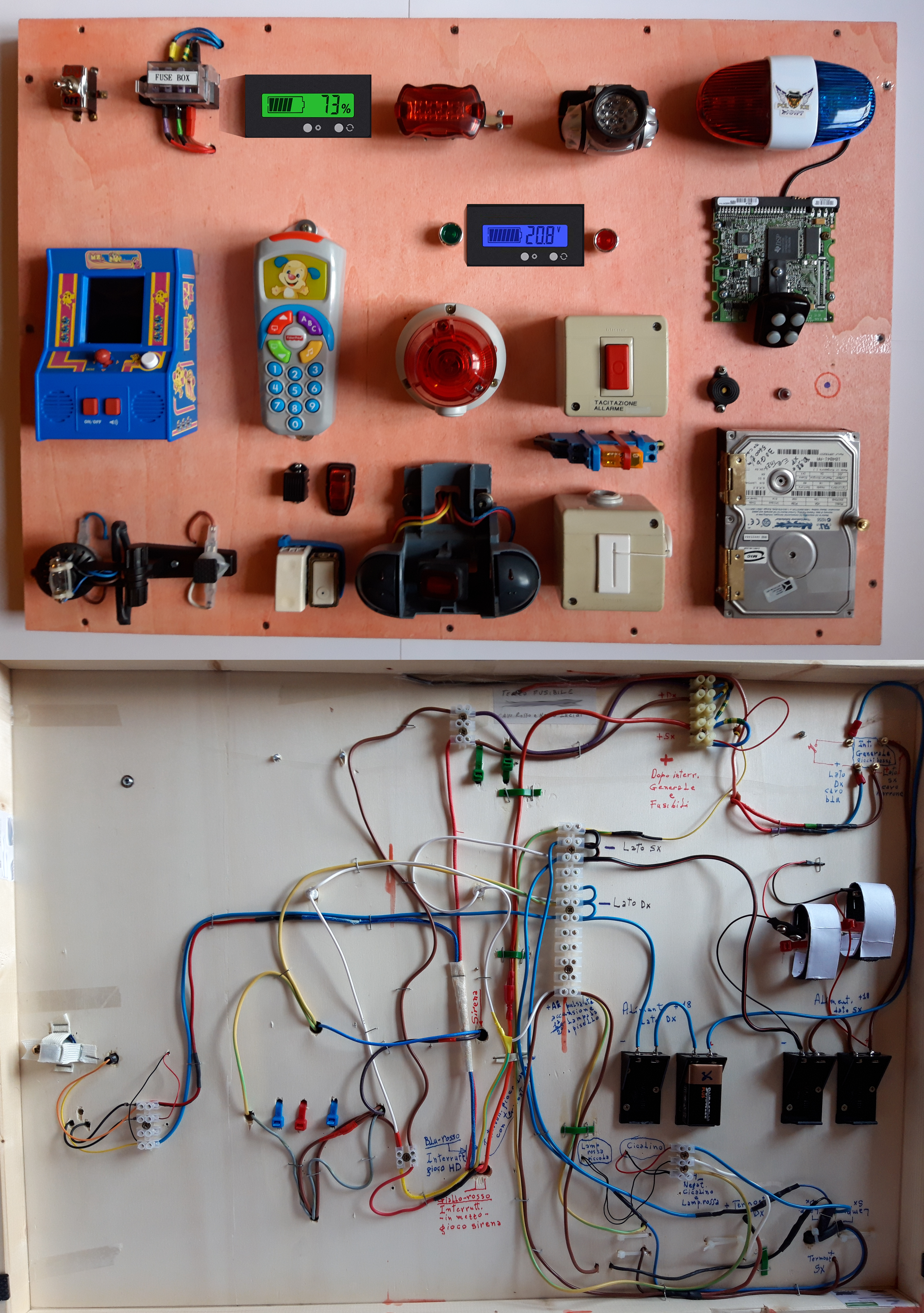
Interactive multimedia educational game.

Multimedia provides students with an alternate means of acquiring knowledge designed to enhance teaching and learning through various media and platforms. In the 1960s, technology began to expand into classrooms through devices such as screens and telewriters. This technology allows students to learn at their own pace and gives teachers the ability to observe the individual needs of each student. The capacity for multimedia to be used in multi-disciplinary settings is structured around the idea of creating a hands-on learning environment through the use of technology. Lessons can be tailored to the subject matter as well as personalized to the students' varying levels of knowledge on the topic. Learning content can be managed through activities that utilize and take advantage of multimedia platforms. This kind of usage of modern multimedia encourages interactive communication between students and teachers and opens feedback channels, introducing an active learning process, especially with the prevalence of new media and social media. Technology has impacted multimedia as it is largely associated with the use of computers or other electronic devices and digital media due to its capabilities concerning research, communication, problem-solving through simulations, and feedback opportunities. The innovation of technology in education through the use of multimedia allows for diversification among classrooms to enhance the overall learning experience for students.

Within education, video games, specifically fast-paced action games, are able to play a big role in improving cognitive abilities involving attention, task switching, and resistance to distractors. Research also shows that, though video games may take time away from schoolwork, implementing games into the school curriculum has an increased probability of moving attention from games to curricular goals.

=== Social work ===
Multimedia is used as an educational method in social work. The five different types of multimedia that support the education process are narrative media, interactive media, communicative media, adaptive media, and productive media. Contrary to long-standing belief, multimedia technology in social work education existed before the prevalence of the internet. It takes the form of images, audio, and video into the curriculum.

First introduced to social work education by Seabury & Maple in 1993, multimedia technology is utilized to teach social work practice skills, including interviewing, crisis intervention, and group work. In comparison with conventional teaching methods, including face-to-face courses, multimedia education shortens transportation time, increases knowledge and confidence in a richer and more authentic context for learning, generates interaction between online users, and enhances understanding of conceptual materials for novice students.

In an attempt to examine the impact of multimedia technology on students' studies, A. Elizabeth Cauble & Linda P. Thurston conducted research in which Building Family Foundations (BFF), an interactive multimedia training platform, was utilized to assess social work students' reactions to multimedia technology on variables of knowledge, attitudes, and self-efficacy. The results state that respondents show a substantial increase in academic knowledge, confidence, and attitude. Multimedia also benefits students because it brings experts online, fits students' schedule, and allows students to choose courses that suit them.

Mayer's Cognitive Theory of Multimedia Learning suggests that "people learn more from words and pictures than from words alone." According to Mayer and other scholars, multimedia technology stimulates people's brains by implementing visual and auditory effects and thereby assists online users to learn efficiently. Researchers suggest that when users establish dual channels while learning, they tend to understand and memorize better. The mixed literature of this theory is still present in the fields of multimedia and social work.

=== Language communication ===
With the spread and development of the English language around the world, multimedia has become an important way of communicating between different people and cultures. Multimedia technology creates a platform where language can be taught. The traditional form of teaching English as a Second Language in classrooms has drastically changed with the prevalence of technology, making it easier for students to obtain language learning skills. Multimedia provides audio, visual, and animation resources for language learning. It also helps create English contexts since an important aspect of learning a language is developing their grammar, vocabulary, and knowledge of pragmatics and genres. In addition, cultural connections in terms of forms, contexts, meanings, and ideologies have to be constructed. By improving thought patterns, multimedia develops students' communicative competence by improving their capacity to understand the language. One of the studies, carried out by Izquierdo, Simard and Pulido, presented the correlation between "Multimedia Instruction (MI) and learners' second language (L2)" and its effects on learning behavior. Their findings, based on Gardner's theory of the "socio-educational model of learner motivation and attitudes," show that there is easier access to language learning materials as well as increased motivation with MI along with the use of computer-assisted language learning.

=== Journalism ===
Newspaper companies all over the world are implementing multimedia in their work. To keep up with the changing world of multimedia, journalistic practices are adopting and utilizing different multimedia functions through the inclusion of visuals such as varying audio, video, text, etc. in their writings.

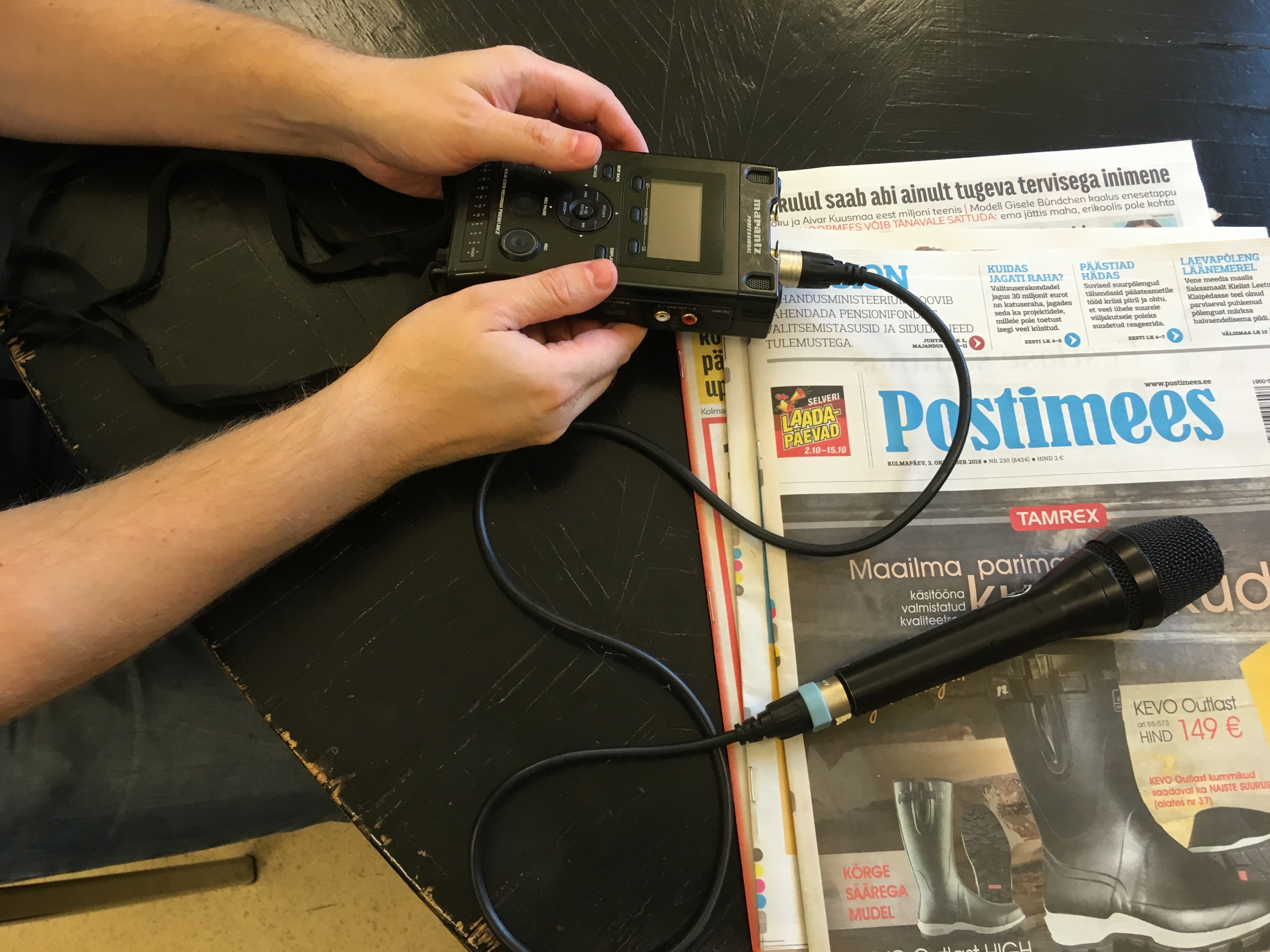

News reporting is not limited to traditional media outlets. Freelance journalists can use different new media to produce multimedia pieces for their news stories. It engages global audiences and tells stories with technology, which develops new communication techniques for both media producers and consumers. The Common Language Project, later renamed The Seattle Globalist, is an example of this type of multimedia journalism production.

Multimedia reporters who are mobile (usually driving around a community with cameras, audio and video recorders, and laptop computers) are often referred to as mojos, or mobile journalists.

=== Multimedia engineering ===
Software engineers may use multimedia in computer simulations for anything from entertainment to training, such as military or industrial training. Multimedia for software interfaces is often done as a collaboration between creative professionals and software engineers. Multimedia helps expand the teaching practices that can be found in engineering to allow for more innovative methods to not only educate future engineers but to help evolve the scope of understanding of where multimedia can be used in specialized engineer careers like software engineers.

Multimedia is also allowing major car manufacturers, such as Ford and General Motors, to expand the design and safety standards of their cars. By using a game engine and virtual reality glasses, these companies are able to test the safety features and the design of the car before a prototype is even made. Building a car virtually reduces the time it takes to produce new vehicles, cutting down on the time needed to test designs and allowing the designers to make changes in real time. It also reduces expenses since, with a virtual car, making real-world prototypes is no longer needed.

=== Mathematical and scientific research ===
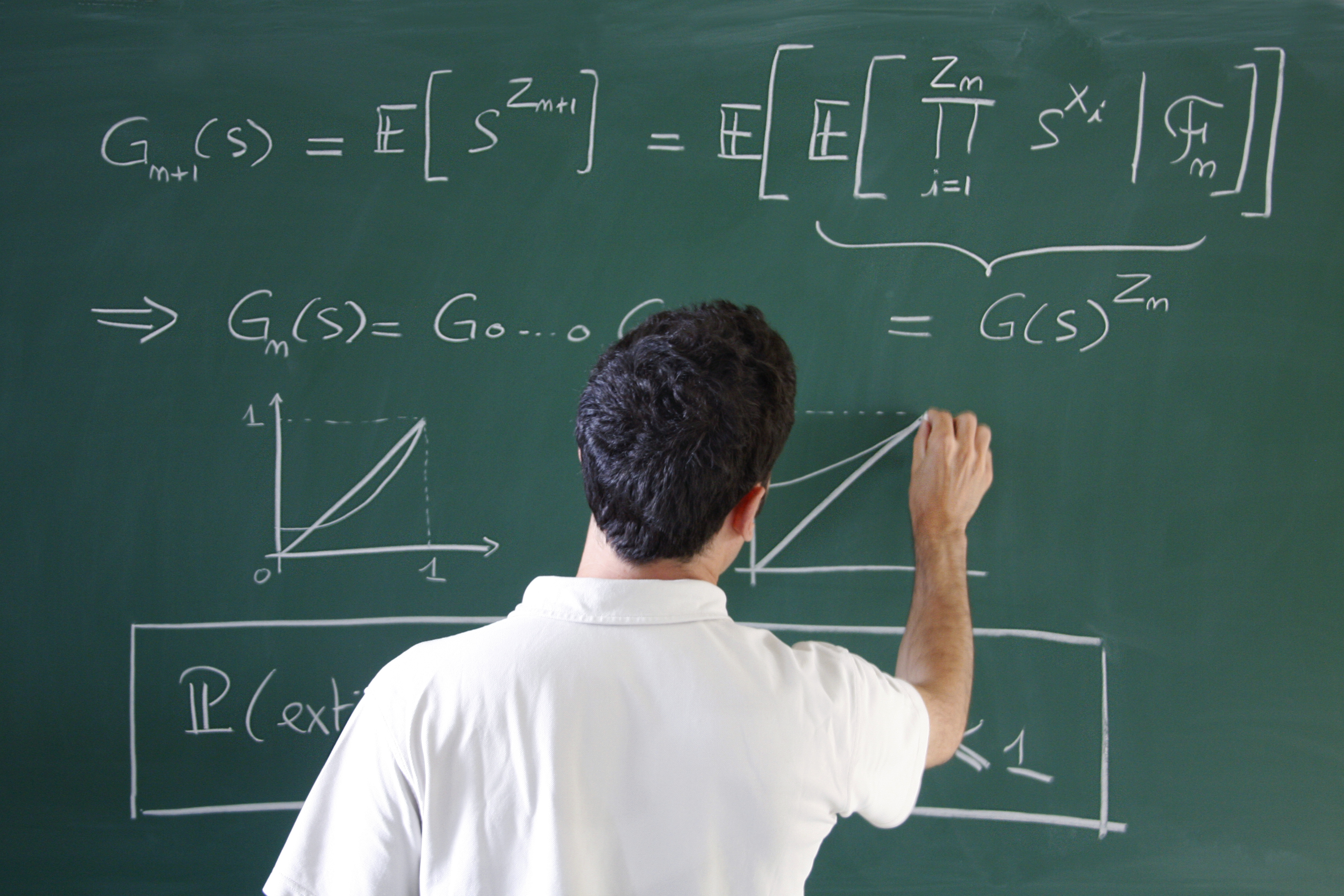

In mathematical and scientific research, multimedia is mainly used for modeling and simulation with binary code. For example, a scientist can look at a molecular model of a particular substance and manipulate it to arrive at a new substance. Representative research can be found in journals such as the Journal of Multimedia. One well-known example of this being applied would be in the movie Interstellar, where Executive Director Kip Thorne helped create one of the most realistic depictions of a black hole in film. The visual effects team under Paul Franklin took Kip Thorne's mathematical data and applied it into their own visual effects engine called "Double Negative Gravitational Renderer," a.k.a. "Gargantua," to create a "real" black hole used in the final cut. Later on, the visual effects team went on to publish a black hole study.

=== Medicine ===
Medical professionals and students have a wide variety of ways to learn new techniques and procedures through interactive media, online courses, and lectures. Multimedia has contributed to changes in how information is presented to students. From the 1800s to today, lessons are commonly taught using chalkboards. Projected aids, such as the epidiascope and slide projectors, were introduced into classrooms around the 1960s. With the growing use of computers, the medical field has begun to incorporate new devices and procedures to assist in teaching students, performing procedures, and analyzing patient data. As well as providing that data in a meaningful way to the patients.

=== Virtual reality ===
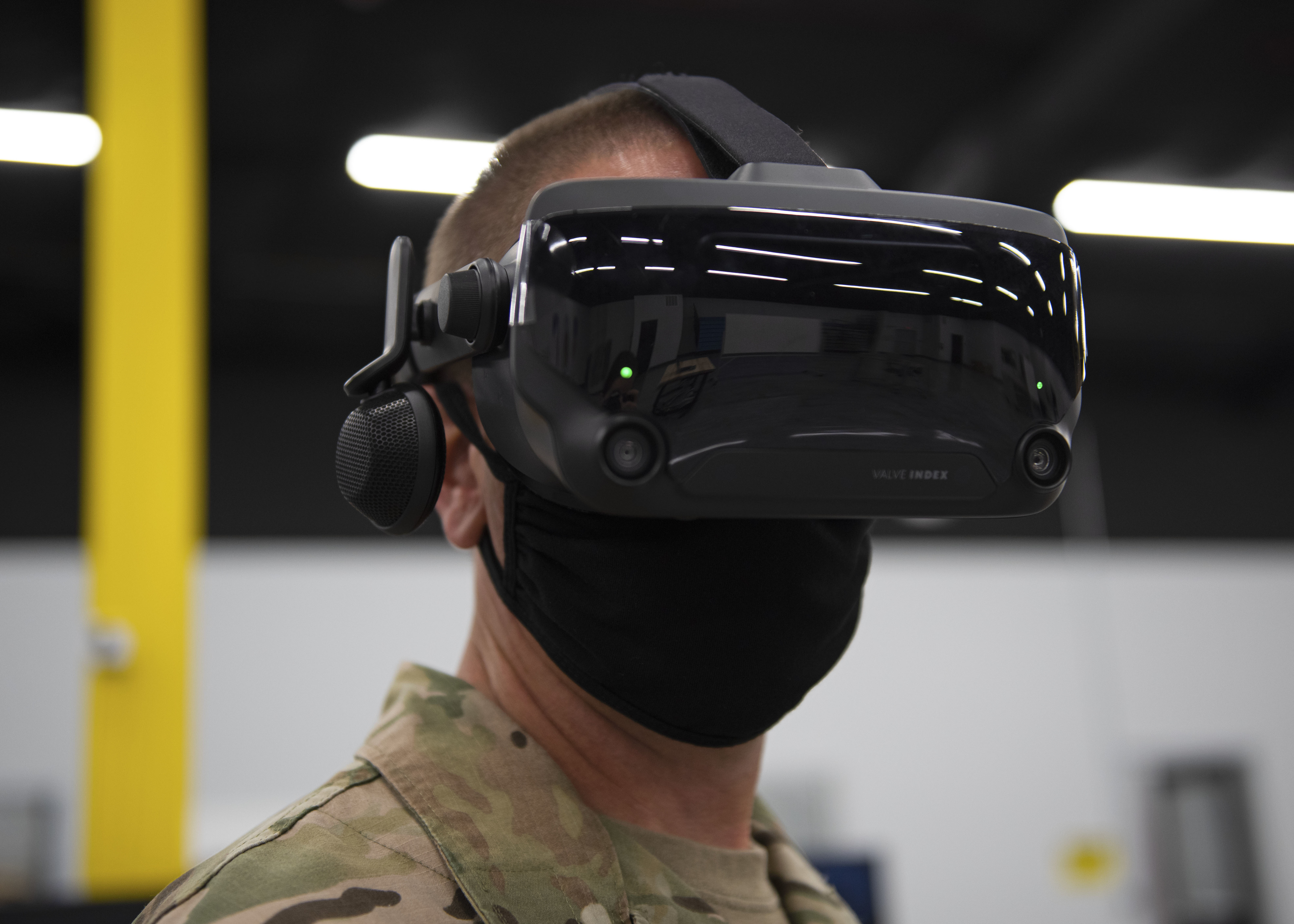
Air force officer using a VR headset to simulate piloting an aircraft.

Virtual reality is a technology that creates a simulated environment, often using computer-generated imagery or a combination of real and virtual content, to immerse users in an interactive and lifelike experience. The aim of virtual reality is to make users feel as if they are physically present in a different environment, even though they are typically still physically located in the real world. Virtual reality finds applications across various fields, including gaming, education, healthcare, training, and entertainment. In gaming, users can interact with simulated virtual environments. In education, VR can provide realistic simulations for training purposes, allowing users to practice skills in a risk-free environment. Healthcare professionals use VR for therapeutic purposes and medical training. The U.S. Air Force has shown using VR for training programs for their new pilots to simulate piloting an aircraft. This allows new pilots to learn in a safe environment and get comfortable before getting in a real aircraft.

Head-mounted display (HMD): Users wear a headset that covers their eyes and ears, providing visual and auditory stimuli. These headsets are equipped with screens that display the virtual environment, and some may also have built-in speakers or headphones for audio.

Motion tracking: Sensors track the user's movements, allowing them to interact with the virtual world. This can include head movements, hand gestures, and sometimes even full-body movements, enhancing the sense of immersion.

Input devices: Controllers or other input devices are used to interact with the virtual environment. These devices can simulate hands or tools, enabling users to manipulate objects or navigate within the virtual space.

Computer processing: Computing hardware, including computers, gaming consoles, and processors built into VR headsets, is used to render the graphics and simulations required for virtual reality environments.

=== Augmented reality ===
Augmented reality overlays digital content or output onto the real world using media such as audio, animation, and text. A modern example of augmented reality is Pokémon GO, a mobile game released on July 6, 2016, which allows users to see a Pokémon in a real-world environment.

== See also ==
- Animation
- Artmedia
- Audio
- Audiovisual
- Computer
- Images
- Internet
- Kraftwerk
- Multi-image
- Multimedia cartography
- Multimedia Messaging Service
- Multimedia search
- New media art
- Non-linear media
- Postliterate society
- Social media
- Text
- Transmedia storytelling
- Universal multimedia access
- Video
- Video game
- Virtual reality
- Web documentary
