= Charlotte Shakespeare =

Theatre company in North Carolina, US

- Formation: 2006
- Type: Theatre Company
- Purpose: production of plays by Shakespeare and other playwrights
- Region served: Charlotte, North Carolina
- Official language: English
- Executive/Artistic Director: Elise Wilkinson
- Managing Director: Joe Copley

Charlotte Shakespeare was a professional, non-profit theatre company in Charlotte, North Carolina. The company specialized in intimate and accessible performances of traditional and modern classics, with an emphasis on the plays of William Shakespeare and with a mission of presenting plays "that reflect timeless truths about the human condition and honor Shakespeare’s genius for storytelling and language".

== History ==
The company was founded by Elise Wilkinson and Joe Copley in 2006 under the name Collaborative Arts Theatre. It was granted status as a 501(c)(3) non-profit organization in 2008. The name was changed to Charlotte Shakespeare in 2012. Charlotte Shakespeare has never had a performance venue of its own. In its first two years productions took place in a tavern, in a series of apartments, and on the Green. Since that time all plays have been produced in theaters at Spirit Square or on The Green. The company went on hiatus in the summer of 2015 and has not reopened.

=== Production history ===
2012 Season

- The Merchant of Venice by William Shakespeare August McGlohon Theatre at Spirit Square
- The Tempest by William Shakespeare June outdoors at The Green
- Bad Dates by Theresa Rebeck March Duke Energy Theatre at Spirit Square

2011 Season

- Time Stands Still by Donald Margulies November Duke Energy Theatre at Spirit Square
- King Lear by William Shakespeare August McGlohon Theatre at Spirit Square
- Tartuffe by Moliere June outdoors at The Green
- Women of Will Shakespeare’s heroines March Duke Energy Theatre at Spirit Square

2010 Season

- Incorruptible by Michael Hollinger November Duke Energy Theatre at Spirit Square
- Othello by William Shakespeare August McGlohon Theatre at Spirit Square
- The Comedy of Errors by William Shakespeare June outdoors at The Green

2009 Season

- Julius Caesar by William Shakespeare August McGlohon Theatre at Spirit Square
- Twelfth Night by William Shakespeare May–June outdoors at The Green

2008 Season

- Sitcoms Live! Classic television sitcom episodes performed live September Duke Energy Theatre at Spirit Square
- Much Ado About Nothing by William Shakespeare August McGlohon Theatre at Spirit Square
- Romeo and Juliet by William Shakespeare June outdoors at The Green
- Closer Than Ever by Richard Maltby and David Shire March Duke Power Theatre at Spirit Square

2007 Season

- The Sublet Experiment by Ethan Youngerman October various venues
- As You Like It by William Shakespeare June outdoors at The Green
- Fiction by Steven Dietz March Duke Power Theatre at Spirit Square

2006 Season

- Bad Dates by Theresa Rebeck September A luxury apartment at 1315 East Condominiums
- A Midsummer Night's Dream by William Shakespeare May outdoors at The Green
- Tavern Shakespeare by Jocelyn Rose and Elise Wilkinson March Ri-Ra Irish Pub, near 208 N Tryon St

== Charlotte Shakespeare Festival ==
Each summer Charlotte Shakespeare produced the Charlotte Shakespeare Festival which began in June with a show presented outdoors on The Green, an uptown pocket park. Charlotte Magazine described the annual return of Shakespeare on the Green as, "one of the best cultural gifts Charlotte will get all year". Admission was free and the company depended on voluntary donations. A second show was presented in August at Spirit Square. Most productions were from the Shakespeare canon, but an exception was made in 2011 when the outdoor summer play was Tartuffe by Moliere.

== Awards & reviews ==
=== Metrolina Theatre Association awards ===
The Metrolina Theatre Association (MTA) is a Charlotte organization which gives awards each year to support and advocate for local theatre, and these awards are a major source of public recognition for theatres, shows, and individuals. A selected list of MTA awards won by Collaborative Arts is shown below.

- 2011 Outstanding Supporting Actor - Female - comedy: Meghan Lowther (Dorine) - Tartuffe
- 2011 Outstanding Costume Design - drama: Suzy Hartness - King Lear
- 2010 Outstanding Production - comedy: Incorruptible
- 2010 Outstanding Direction - comedy: Peter Smeal - Incorruptible
- 2010 Outstanding Supporting Actor - Male - comedy: Joe Copley (Brother Martin) - Incorruptible
- 2010 Outstanding Costume Design - comedy: Erin Dougherty - The Comedy of Errors
- 2010 Outstanding Cameo: Alan England (Duke/Musician) - Othello
- 2008 Other Exemplary Performance/Element - comedy: Sitcoms Live!
- 2008 Outstanding Set Design - comedy: Chris Timmons - Much Ado About Nothing

=== Creative Loafing's Annual Charlotte Theatre Awards ===
Creative Loafing (CL) is a publisher of newsweeklies and their associated websites focusing on local affairs, including arts and entertainment. A selected list of CL awards won by Collaborative Arts is shown below.

- 2011 Best Supporting Actress - drama: Christine Dougan (Emilia) - Othello
- 2011 Top 20 Shows: Othello
- 2011 Top 20 Shows: Incorruptible
- 2010 Outstanding Costume Design - comedy: Erin Dougherty - The Comedy of Errors
- 2010 Outstanding Cameo - drama: Alan England (Duke/Musician) - Othello
- 2007 Best Performing Arts Overachiever: Elise Wilkinson
- 2007 Best Supporting Actress - drama: Elise Wilkinson (Abby) - Fiction
- 2007 Sweet 16 Award: The Sublet Experiment
- 2007 Sweet 16 Award: Fiction
- 2006 Theater Event of the Year: Shakespeare on the Green
- 2006 Sweet 16 Award: Bad Dates
- 2006 Sweet 16 Award: A Midsummer Night's Dream

=== Selected Reviews ===
- Tavern Shakespeare
- Tavern Shakespeare
- A Midsummer Night's Dream
- A Midsummer Night's Dream
- Bad Dates
- Bad Dates
- Fiction
- Fiction
- As You Like It
- As You Like It
- The Sublet Experiment
- The Sublet Experiment
- Closer Than Ever
- Romeo and Juliet
- Romeo and Juliet
- Much Ado About Nothing
- Much Ado About Nothing
- Sitcoms Live!
- Sitcoms Live!
- Twelfth Night
- Julius Caesar
- Julius Caesar
- The Comedy of Errors
- The Comedy of Errors
- Othello
- Incorruptible
- Incorruptible
- Women of Will
- Women of Will
- Tartuffe
- King Lear
- King Lear
- Time Stands Still
- Bad Dates
- The Tempest
- The Merchant of Venice
- The Merchant of Venice
- Opus
