= Bobb Goldsteinn =

American singer-songwriter

- Birth name: Bob Goldstein
- Born: June 10, 1936 (age 89)
- Origin: Philadelphia, Pennsylvania, United States
- Genres: Pop, rock, folk
- Occupation(s): Record producer, songwriter, musician, writer, arranger
- Years active: 1964–2024

Bobb Goldsteinn (born Bob Goldstein, June 10, 1936) is an American showman, songwriter, and artist. As a pop pioneer, he co-wrote The Village Stompers' international hit "Washington Square" and produced The GoldeBriars, Curt Boettcher's original Sunshine Pop singing group. He has been credited with coining the term "multimedia".

== Early years ==
Bobb Goldsteinn was born in Philadelphia, where he attended Overbrook High School and Temple University. He began writing songs while still in junior high school and continued through college. In 1958, he won an audition to write songs and sketches at the Tamiment Playhouse in the Pocono Mountains of Eastern Pennsylvania.

At Tamiment, his sketch-writing partner was Woody Allen and his songwriting partner was Billy Goldenberg. Midway through the summer season of 1958, Goldsteinn discovered that his songs were being especially well received and decided to work as a solo songwriter after Tamiment. He moved to New York City shortly thereafter and became an assistant to Burt Shevelove.

A social encounter with songwriter John Gluck Jr. in 1959 led to Bobb's introduction to the legendary Brill Building, then the heart of America's Tin Pan Alley, where Goldsteinn and Gluck soon began peddling their tunes. They had little success and Bobb decided to move back to Philadelphia to concentrate on mastering the craft of theatre songwriting. Within a year, he had created a body of original material and recorded a revue of topical sketches and songs called "Present Tense" (with songs by Goldsteinn and sketches by Woody Allen). At the same time, Bob Sour (the President of BMI) and Allan Becker (the head of BMI's music theatre department) heard of Goldsteinn's work and invited him back to New York to join the first class of writers at the innovative BMI Lehman Engel Musical Theater Workshop.

After returning to New York in 1960, Bobb continued working with John Gluck and the duo was discovered by Jerry Leiber of Leiber and Stoller Music. Goldsteinn and Gluck were signed on as staff writers, just as Ellie Greenwich was a while later (who had also met Leiber through John Gluck). Unfortunately, only one record from that period bears Goldsteinn's name: “The Other Girls” – the ‘B’ side of Jay and the Americans’ first 45 single, backed with “Tonight” from “West Side Story.”

== "Washington Square" ==
In 1962, Goldsteinn took a song called "India," which he had written as a high school student, and renamed it "Washington Square." He created a distinctive arrangement for the tune called "folk-dixie," an instrumental style that synthesized folk, jazz and Dixieland and represented the first hyphenated arrangement in pop music. "Washington Square," as recorded by the Village Stompers, became a chart-topper across the world in 1963 and 1964, reaching No. 2 in the United States and holding the No. 1 spot on the Japanese charts for six months. In Japan, the recording sold over 800,000 copies and earned a Gold Record from the Recording Industry Association of Japan by June 1964; it held the record for best-selling album and single until it was surpassed by Michael Jackson's Thriller 19 years later. In 1964, the song was nominated for two Grammy Awards - Best Instrumental Arrangement and Best Instrumental Theme.

In the following years, the song would be recorded by The Ames Brothers, the Kirby Stone Four, Percy Faith, Lawrence Welk, Kenny Ball, Spike Jones, James Last, Andre Kostelanetz, Kai Winding, The Ventures, and The Dukes of Dixieland (among many others).

In late 1964, Goldsteinn started managing, producing and co-writing for the GoldeBriars. Among his most significant lyrical contributions were "Sea of Tears," which he co-wrote with Curt Boettcher, "June Bride Baby" with Beverly Ross, and "Tell it to the Wind" with Jeff Barry.

== "Lightworks" and Multimedia ==
In 1965, when the GoldeBriars disbanded, Goldsteinn turned his attention to further developing the field of "colour music." That year, he hosted a Christmas party for his friends, which he called "Bob Goldstein’s Lightworks." In his Greenwich Village studio, Bob created an environmental visual jukebox that illustrated music by surrounding the spectator with manually synchronized light effects, slides, films, moving screens, and curtains of light under mirror balls that kept the room in spin. Word soon spread about the show's pioneering style (Life magazine referred to the parties as "the seedbed of new sound and light concept," Women's Wear Daily proclaimed that "'Lightworks' may well replace the discotheque, movies, TV, and everything else!", and the New York Herald Tribune explained that "Bob Goldstein has managed to put into workable form something that lots of people have been reaching for... The problem for a long time has been to appeal to more than one of the senses at the same time") and the presentation became a continual happening, held both in New York City and in Southampton, Long Island at L’Oursin. In 1966, Albert Goldman profiled Goldsteinn in New York Magazine, and said of his experience at L'Oursin: "After tuning my senses to the stunning melange of sights and sounds coming from every direction, I made a snap decision to stay there the rest of my life." Lightworks even inspired the term "multimedia" — a word coined by Goldsteinn to describe the technical nature of his entertainment and popularized by articles in Variety, Newsday, and other publications. These performances by Goldsteinn later inspired Andy Warhol to create similar multimedia lightshows, first of which he held at the Electric Circus, which he used Goldsteinn's name for, calling it "The Lightworks", though Goldsteinn quickly sent a cease and desist letter to Warhol, and the event's name was promptly changed to "The Balloon Farm", and later the Exploding Plastic Inevitable.

Goldsteinn's multimedia work was recognized as an important influence on art, cinema, advertising, fashion, and retail display. The first commercial application of the concept was designed and produced by Goldsteinn himself at Henri Bendel's in New York in 1966. For that year's Christmas season, Goldsteinn designed a first-floor display based on the “Christmas on the Thames” scene in Virginia Woolf’s Orlando: A Biography. The Lightworks-inspired set included 70,000 hand-painted bulbs that “dimmed up and dimmed down to the groovy beat of records played by a full-time dee-jay” and was called a “courageous” departure from the traditional Christmas Trees and Santa Clauses of holiday decorations by the New York World Journal Tribune. Lester Gaba, a renowned retail display designer and a partner of Vincente Minnelli, raved about the “Chriscotheque” at Bendel's – calling it “the nouvelle spell of Christmas 1966”. Finally, Goldsteinn's identity as an important influence on the art world in general was solidified by his inclusion in Fluxus founder, George Maciunas's "Expanded Arts Diagram" as an "Expanded Cinema" pioneer in 1989.

The "Lightworks" name was appropriated by Helena Rubenstein to brand a new line of youthful cosmetics. While the line featured a handful of products that were imagined and created without Goldsteinn's input, the Rubenstein Company allowed him to produce a radio commercial that was an audio counterpart of the psychedelic posters announcing the contemporary rock bills at various venues around the country. The radio spot featured spoken copy delivered over a singer and a music track, written by Bob Kessler. This simultaneous combination of copy and song had never been done before. Bobb hired Ellie Greenwich to do the singing, and selected Jim Morrison as the announcer. Unfortunately, the ad agency that handled the line had never heard of either Morrison or The Doors, and they nixed him.

In the fall of 1968, Goldsteinn returned to songwriting and crafted the lyrics for "Canterbury Road" to a melody by Curt Boettcher and friends. The song was written for pop singer Lou Christie and while it was not formally released, Roy Halee made a copy of the mix and took it to Paul Simon; a few months later, "Bridge over Troubled Water" appeared. All master tape copies of "Canterbury Road" disappeared until 1990–1991, when an in-flight audiotape was found in a Dutch flea market. The song was finally released on a Lou Christie import album called Glory River in 1992.

Between 1969 and 1972, Goldsteinn collaborated with Andy Warhol on a number of projects. First, he wrote the title track to Warhol's movie Lonesome Cowboys, a track that is now known to be the first disco arrangement in music history. Goldsteinn also conceived the cover of The Rolling Stones’ Sticky Fingers album, originally designed to be the cover of the Lonesome Cowboys LP. This record was to contain a dozen new compositions, all ‘inspired’ by the title song, but the label went under before the project could be completed and released. Finally, Goldsteinn ran the Lightworks equipment as the mise en scene in the opening scene of Warhol's film Trash. Stripper Jeri Miller attempts to fellate the star, Joe Dallesandro, as Goldsteinn's screens, curtains of lights and mirror balls play in the background.

In 1972, Goldsteinn created a Lightworks retrospective entitled "The Strange Festival" that featured all of his sequences arranged into a narrative form, illustrating the central chapters of the French classic Le Grand Meaulnes. Ernest Leogrande, writing for the New York Daily News, reported that "for two hours, curtains of lights move back and forth, screens roll up and down, mirrored balls revolve overhead, images appear and fade, blending into one another, music plays and there is both beauty and humor with a Goldstein concert of his own songs at the end."

== California Schooling ==
In 1974, Goldsteinn left for California in order to continue his education at Los Angeles Pierce College. He studied music, photography, and law, and graduated with an Associates degree from Los Angeles City College in 1982. While at Pierce, he studied music theory with the prolific composer, Rowan Taylor and was one of the winners of Radio KWST LA Soundtrack Record Competition with the song "San Fernando Valley Valerie" In 1980, Goldsteinn went to Naropa University in Boulder, Colorado to study Buddhism.

During this time, Goldsteinn participated in a number of small projects as a favor to friends and acquaintances (including a brief co-venture with the pioneering gay adult magazine publisher Don Embinder), but he was making a concerted effort to stay out of the entertainment business and intended to do so until he felt ready to return.

== Return to Entertainment ==
In 1987, Goldsteinn was summoned back to New York for family reasons and, at the suggestion of Johnson Burtt, a future business partner, decided to re-enter the industry. That year, he was invited to join the board of directors at Theatre Off Park, which produced shows like "Mademoiselle Colombe" starring Tammy Grimes under his tenure.

During his first year back in New York, Goldsteinn was also heavily involved in the production of the 1st benefit for Bailey House, a hospice for homeless people with AIDS. “That's What Friends Are For” at the fabled Village Gate was an all-star evening of cabaret featuring two dozen stars, including Larry Kert, Julie Wilson, Margaret Whiting and Jack Wrangler.

== California, Again ==
By 1990, Goldsteinn became dissatisfied with work in New York and decided to return once again to California. In Los Angeles, he began an entertainment company, gOLDbURTT Media, with his former neighbor, Johnson Burtt. The company was initially confronted with failure, when it was removed from a commission to orchestrate the domestic release of Impromptu the first movie directed by James Lapine. However, the company roared back immediately when Goldsteinn promoted "The Strippers' Hall of Fame"—a sensational reunion event featuring a collection of elderly ecdysiasts which prompted TV crews from around the world to descend en masse upon a dilapidated motel in the Antelope Valley, between Los Angeles and Las Vegas.

gOLDbURT Media was dissolved in 1993 due to financial and personal hardships that befell the company. That year, Goldsteinn was asked by Albert Brenner's daughter, Faye, to manage and stage an all-female a cappella group called The Joy of Six. The group made its first stage appearance in front of an audience at The Harmony Sweepstakes Southern California Regionals and won First Prize. The group was offered thousands of dollars in bookings, but the women decided that they did not want to spend their lives on the road and disbanded after the San Francisco Finals were held a month later.

In 1995, Goldsteinn completed two high-profile art projects in quick succession. First, he designed the print teaser for "David Lynch Presents CRUMB", a documentary about Robert Crumb, for which Goldsteinn was nominated for a Key Art Award from The Hollywood Reporter. Then, in 1996, he created what he considers to be his graphic masterwork: "The 'Hollywood Boulevard' Street Sign". The billboard, unveiled by Robert Downey Sr. the night of the Hollywood Christmas Parade, is presented in a landscape format, where the words "Hollywood" and "Boulevard" are placed atop one another to spell out the word "OLD" with the letters that they share in common (a subcutaneous nod to the history of a street that rivals Broadway in legend).

== New York, Again ==
In 1997, Goldsteinn was invited back to New York for a Passover Seder at his brother's house, but he decided to stay, as he had been embraced by the city's anarchist community. The anarchists provided him with a room in a "homestead" as a squatter on 9th Street in Alphabet City. In appreciation, Goldsteinn co-founded and co-curated a group art-show at their community center, ABC No Rio. The Village Voice described 1998's "The IDES of March" as a production of "60 artists on four floors, filling the building with fresh art from New York, Brooklyn, Boston, and California."

In 1997, during his time at the homestead, Goldsteinn had a chance encounter with Albert Marcus, who would later become his best friend, business partner, and collaborator. Together, the two have started Take-Home Tunes, The Adaption Agency and The Roger Edens Foundation. In 2007, Goldsteinn and Marcus became the producers of the 32 year-old Beekman Place holiday tradition, Irving Berlin’s ‘White Christmassing.’ For the 2008 edition of the event, The Foundation commissioned an original song to celebrate the evening entitled “We:HYMN ‘White Christmas.’” The song was imagined as a companion piece to "White Christmas" to stand in for its original verse intro.
