= List of Billboard Middle-Road Singles number ones of 1963 =

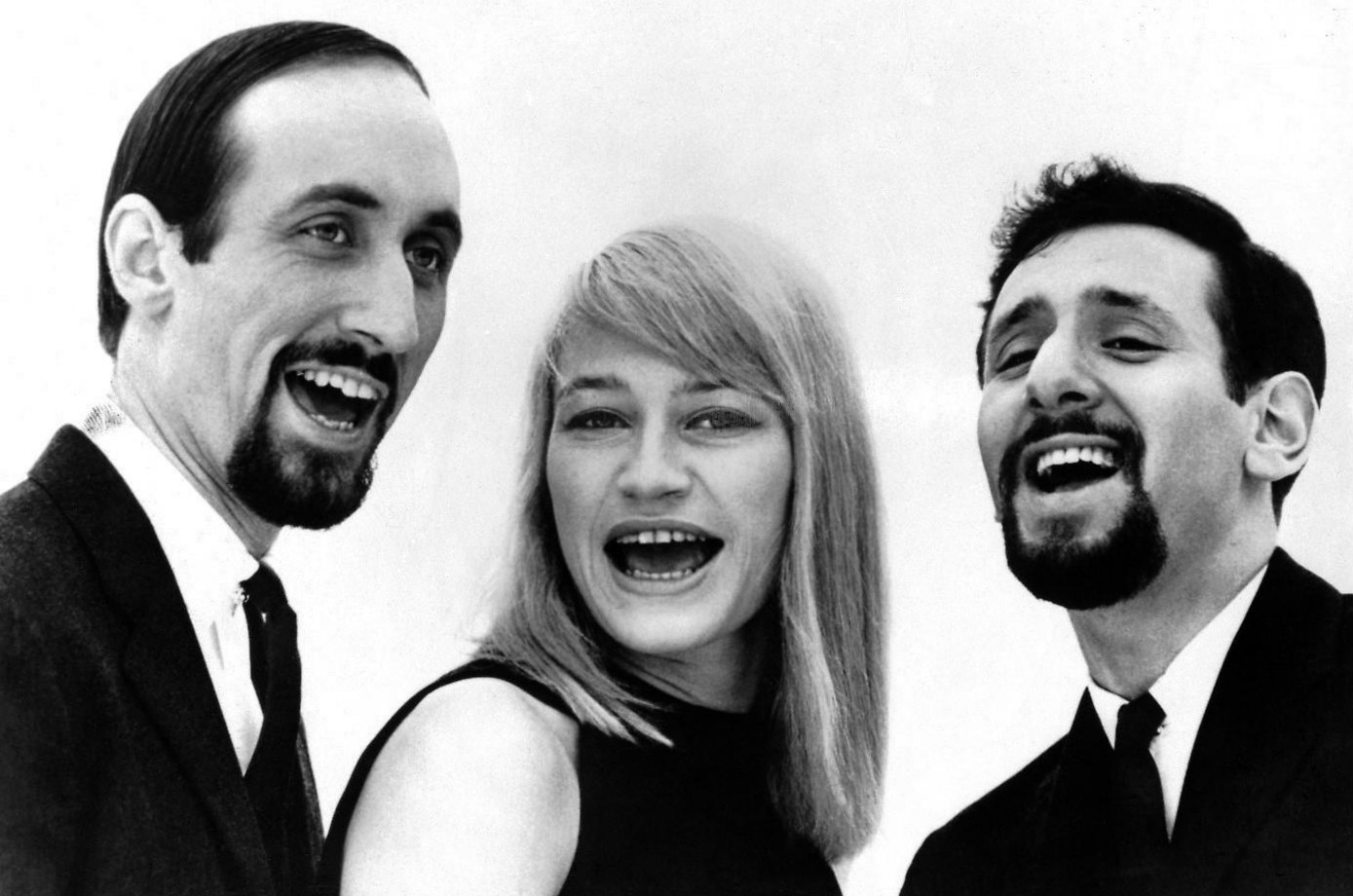
Peter, Paul and Mary had two Middle-Road number ones in 1963, the only act to do so.

In 1963, Billboard magazine published a chart ranking the top-performing songs in the United States which were considered to be "middle of the road". The chart has undergone various name changes and since 1996 has been published under the title Adult Contemporary. Until 1965, the listing was compiled simply by extracting from Billboard's pop music chart, the Hot 100, those songs which were deemed by the magazine's staff to be of an appropriate style and ranking them according to their placings on the Hot 100. In 1963, the chart was published under the title Middle-Road Singles and 14 different songs topped the listing in 52 issues of the magazine.

At the start of the year, Steve Lawrence held the number one position with "Go Away Little Girl", which stayed in the top spot through the issue of Billboard dated January 19 before it was replaced by "Walk Right In" by the Rooftop Singers. Only one act had more than one number one hit during the year: folk trio Peter, Paul and Mary spent two weeks at the top of the chart in May with "Puff, the Magic Dragon" and a further five weeks at number one in August with "Blowin' in the Wind". The latter song was replaced in the top spot by the longest-running Middle-Road chart-topper of the year, "Blue Velvet" by Bobby Vinton, which spent eight consecutive weeks at number one. Vinton thus also had the highest total number of weeks at number one by any artist.

Nearly half of the acts who topped the Middle-Road chart in 1963 never reached number one on the Hot 100, including the Cascades, Skeeter Davis, Rolf Harris, and the Village Stompers. Neither Al Martino nor Andy Williams ever topped the Hot 100, but both reached number one on the Most Played by Jockeys chart, one of the multiple pop charts which Billboard published prior to the creation of the Hot 100 in 1958. The success of the Cascades was short-lived, and the group achieved the unusual feat of topping the Middle-Road chart with the only one of their songs ever to appear on the listing. This feat was also achieved by the Singing Nun, who had the final Middle-Road number one of 1963 with "Dominique". Although it also topped the Hot 100, it was the only song which the Singing Nun, a Belgian vocalist also billed as Soeur Sourire (Sister Smile), placed on either chart during her brief commercial career.

== Chart history ==
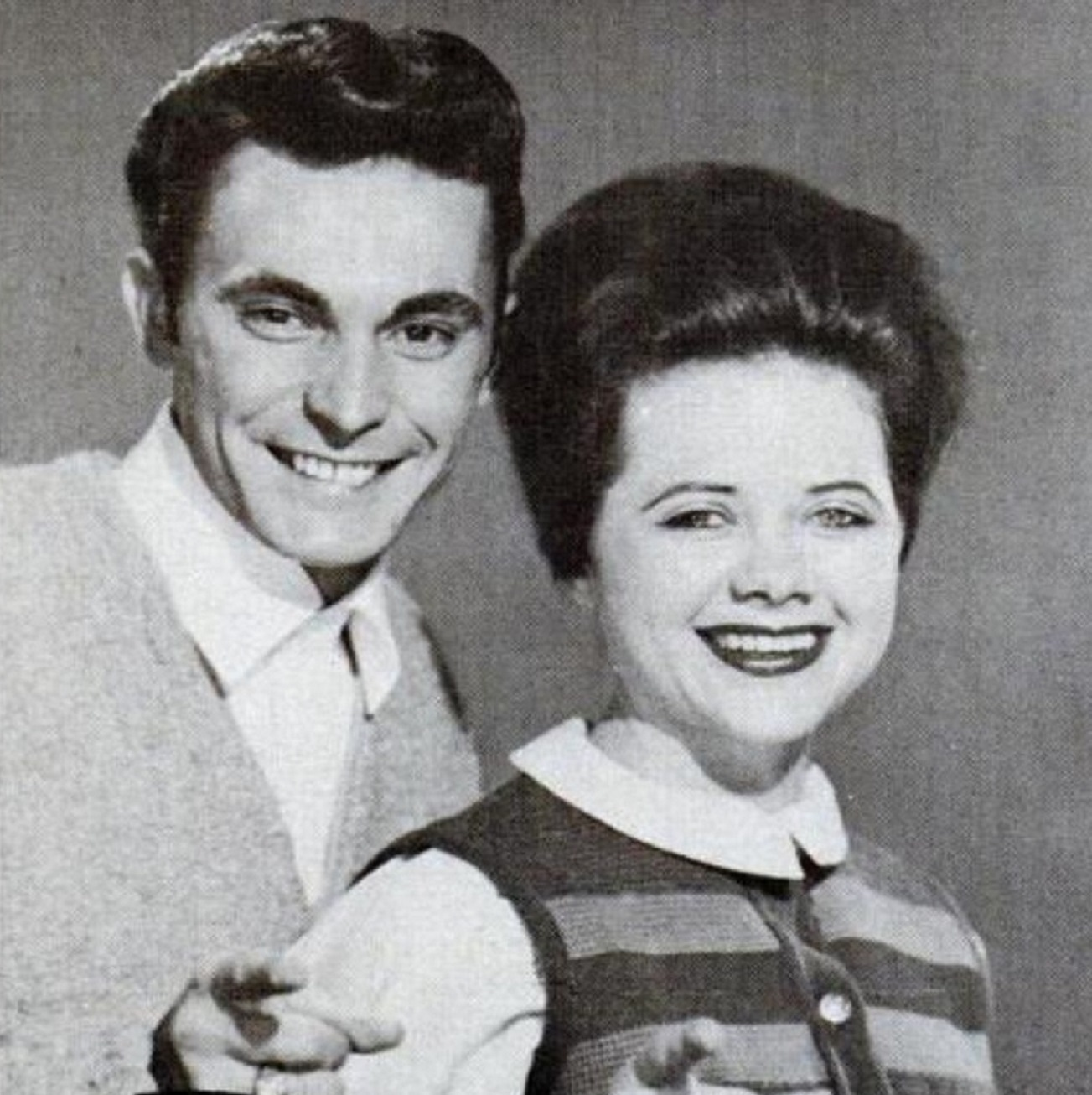
Dale and Grace spent two weeks at number one with "I'm Leaving It Up to You".

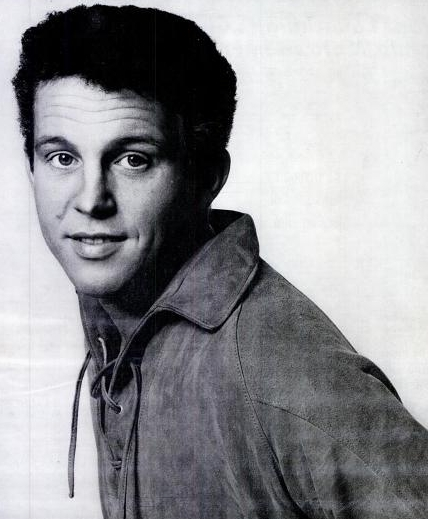
Bobby Vinton's "Blue Velvet" was the longest-running number one of the year.

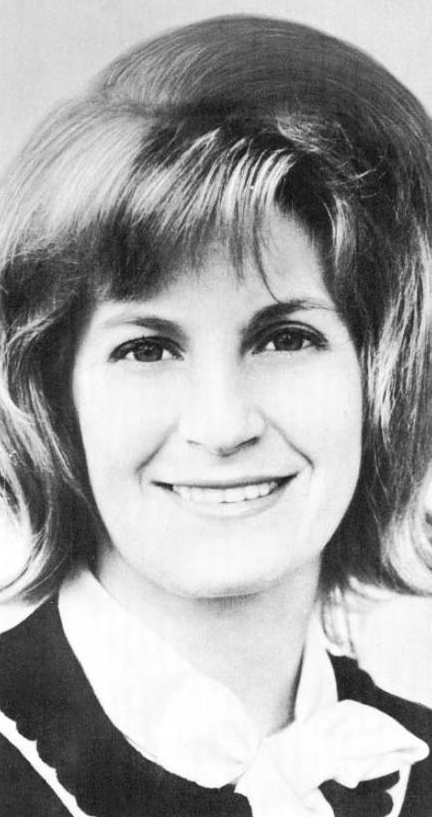
Skeeter Davis topped the chart with "The End of the World".

Chart history
Issue date	Title	Artist(s)	Ref.
January 5	"Go Away Little Girl"	Steve Lawrence	
January 12	"Go Away Little Girl"	Steve Lawrence	
January 19	"Go Away Little Girl"	Steve Lawrence	
January 26	"Walk Right In"	The Rooftop Singers	
February 2	"Walk Right In"	The Rooftop Singers	
February 9	"Walk Right In"	The Rooftop Singers	
February 16	"Walk Right In"	The Rooftop Singers	
February 23	"Walk Right In"	The Rooftop Singers	
March 2	"Rhythm of the Rain"	The Cascades	
March 9	"Rhythm of the Rain"	The Cascades	
March 16	"The End of the World"	Skeeter Davis	
March 23	"The End of the World"	Skeeter Davis	
March 30	"The End of the World"	Skeeter Davis	
April 6	"The End of the World"	Skeeter Davis	
April 13	"Can't Get Used to Losing You"	Andy Williams	
April 20	"Can't Get Used to Losing You"	Andy Williams	
April 27	"Can't Get Used to Losing You"	Andy Williams	
May 4	"Can't Get Used to Losing You"	Andy Williams	
May 11	"Puff, the Magic Dragon"	Peter, Paul and Mary	
May 18	"Puff, the Magic Dragon"	Peter, Paul and Mary	
May 25	"I Love You Because"	Al Martino	
June 1	"I Love You Because"	Al Martino	
June 8	"Sukiyaki"	Kyu Sakamoto	
June 15	"Sukiyaki"	Kyu Sakamoto	
June 22	"Sukiyaki"	Kyu Sakamoto	
June 29	"Sukiyaki"	Kyu Sakamoto	
July 6	"Sukiyaki"	Kyu Sakamoto	
July 13	"Tie Me Kangaroo Down, Sport"	Rolf Harris	
July 20	"Tie Me Kangaroo Down, Sport"	Rolf Harris	
July 27	"Tie Me Kangaroo Down, Sport"	Rolf Harris	
August 3	"Blowin' in the Wind"	Peter, Paul and Mary	
August 10	"Blowin' in the Wind"	Peter, Paul and Mary	
August 17	"Blowin' in the Wind"	Peter, Paul and Mary	
August 24	"Blowin' in the Wind"	Peter, Paul and Mary	
August 31	"Blowin' in the Wind"	Peter, Paul and Mary	
September 7	"Blue Velvet"	Bobby Vinton	
September 14	"Blue Velvet"	Bobby Vinton	
September 21	"Blue Velvet"	Bobby Vinton	
September 28	"Blue Velvet"	Bobby Vinton	
October 5	"Blue Velvet"	Bobby Vinton	
October 12	"Blue Velvet"	Bobby Vinton	
October 19	"Blue Velvet"	Bobby Vinton	
October 26	"Blue Velvet"	Bobby Vinton	
November 2	"Washington Square"	The Village Stompers	
November 9	"Washington Square"	The Village Stompers	
November 16	"Washington Square"	The Village Stompers	
November 23	"I'm Leaving It Up to You"	Dale and Grace	
November 30	"I'm Leaving It Up to You"	Dale and Grace	
December 7	"Dominique"	The Singing Nun	
December 14	"Dominique"	The Singing Nun	
December 21	"Dominique"	The Singing Nun	
December 28	"Dominique"	The Singing Nun	

== See also ==
- 1963 in music
- List of artists who reached number one on the U.S. Adult Contemporary chart
