= David Shire =

American songwriter and composer

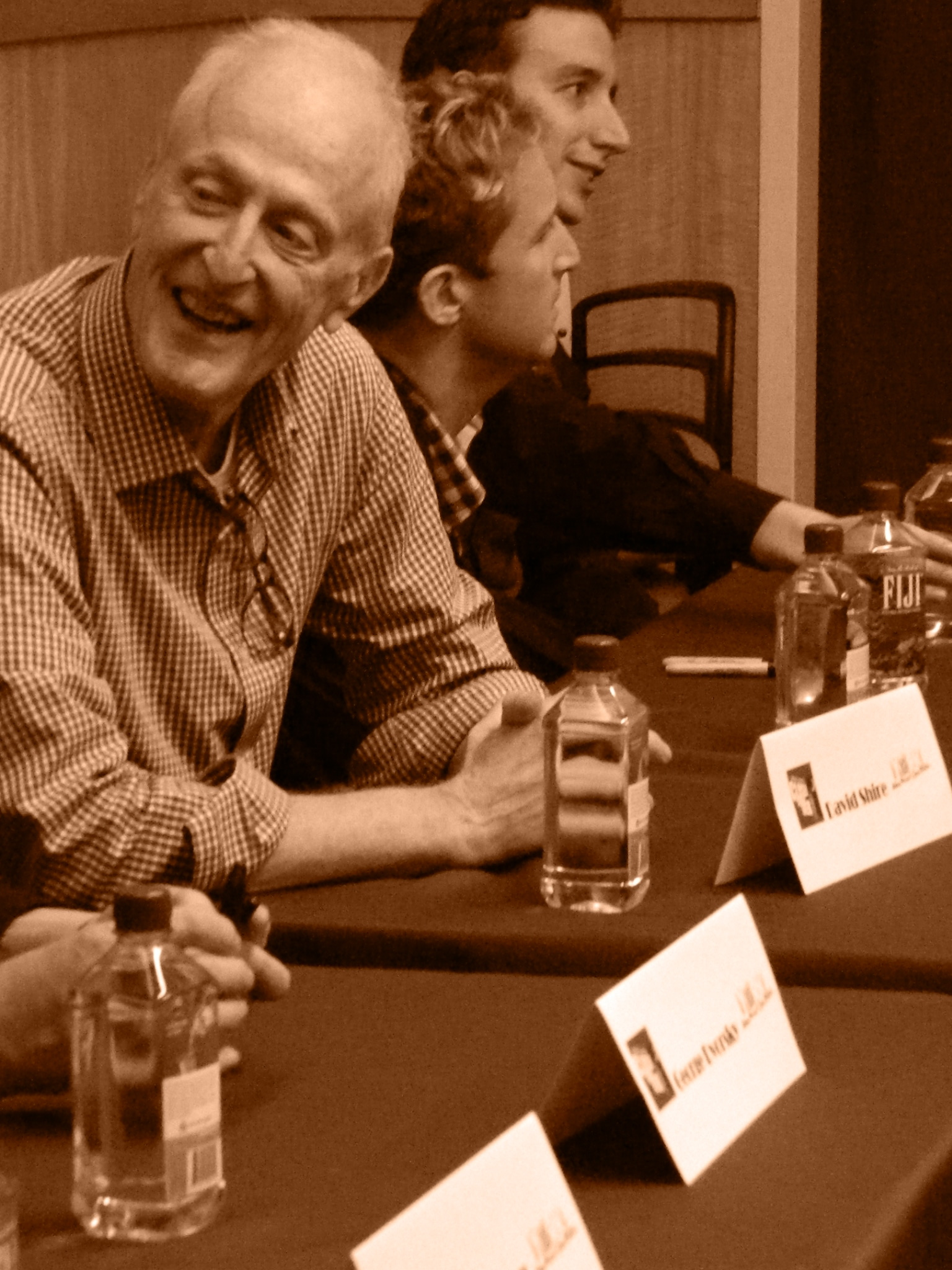
- Shire in New York City with pianist and composer Andrew Gerle and bassist Danny Weller on September 20, 2013.
- Born: David Lee Shire; July 3, 1937 (age 89); Buffalo, New York, U.S.
- Occupation: Composer
- Years active: 1960s–present
- Spouses: Talia Coppola (m. 1970; div. 1980) Didi Conn (m. 1984)
- Children: 2
- Musical career
- Genres: Film score musicals Television score
- Instrument: Piano
- Website: davidshiremusic.com

David Lee Shire (born July 3, 1937) is an American songwriter and composer of stage musicals, film and television scores. Among his best known works are the motion picture soundtracks to The Big Bus, The Taking of Pelham One Two Three, The Conversation, All the President's Men, and parts of the Saturday Night Fever soundtrack such as "Manhattan Skyline". His other work includes the score of the 1985 film Return to Oz (the "sequel-in-part" of The Wizard of Oz), and the stage musical scores of Baby, Big, Closer Than Ever, and Starting Here, Starting Now. Shire is married to actress Didi Conn.

== Education and early career ==
Shire was born in Buffalo, New York, to Esther Miriam (née Sheinberg) and Buffalo society band leader and piano teacher Irving Daniel Shire. His family was Jewish. His secondary education was at the Nichols School. He met his long-time theater collaborator lyricist/director Richard Maltby Jr. at Yale University, where they wrote two musicals, Cyrano and Grand Tour, which were produced by the Yale Dramatic Association. Shire also co-fronted a jazz ensemble at Yale, the Shire-Fogg Quintet, and was a Phi Beta Kappa honors student, with a double major in English and music. He was a member of the Pundits and Elihu and he graduated magna cum laude in 1959.

After a semester of graduate work at Brandeis University (where he was the first Eddie Fisher Fellow) and six months in the U.S. Army National Guard infantry, Shire took up residence in New York City, working as a dance class pianist, theater rehearsal and pit pianist, and society band musician while constantly working with Maltby on musicals. Their first off-Broadway show, The Sap of Life, was produced in 1961 at One Sheridan Square Theater in Greenwich Village. He co-wrote The Village Stompers' "Washington Square" with Bob Goldstein in 1963.

== Film and television scoring ==
Shire began scoring for television in the 1960s and made the leap to scoring feature films in the early 1970s. He was then married to actress Talia Shire, for whose brother Francis Ford Coppola he scored The Conversation, perhaps his best known score, in 1974. Additional screen credits include Two People, The Taking of Pelham One Two Three, The Hindenburg, Farewell, My Lovely, All The President's Men, The Big Bus, 2010, Return to Oz, Short Circuit, Max Dugan Returns, and Zodiac. He composed original music for Saturday Night Fever (for which he received two Grammy Award nominations), and also worked on several disco adaptations including "Night on Disco Mountain". He won the Academy Award for Best Song in 1979 for his and Norman Gimbel's theme song for Norma Rae, "It Goes Like It Goes." He was also nominated the same year in the same category for "I'll Never Say Goodbye," from the motion picture The Promise, with lyrics jointly written by Marilyn and Alan Bergman. In 1979 his song "With You I'm Born Again," recorded by Billy Preston and Syreeta, was a top five international hit and stayed on the pop charts for 26 weeks.

The Conversation featured a score for piano. On some cues, Shire took the taped sounds of the piano and distorted them in different ways to create alternative sonic textures to round out the score. The music is intended to capture the isolation and paranoia of protagonist Harry Caul (Gene Hackman). The score was released on CD by Intrada Records.

For the "Main Title" of The Taking of Pelham One Two Three, Shire set a jazz-funk groove in B-flat minor, and made the lead melodies and chords out of atonal twelve-tone rows in short bursts of variously shaped motives. The soundtrack album was the first-ever CD release by Film Score Monthly. The end titles contain a more expansive arrangement of the theme.

Shire's television scores have earned five Emmy nominations. His hundreds of scores for television include: Killer Bees; Raid on Entebbe; The Kennedys of Massachusetts; Serving In Silence: The Margarethe Cammermeyer Story; Christopher Reeve's Rear Window; Oprah Winfrey's The Women of Brewster Place; and The Heidi Chronicles. He also composed themes for the television series Alice and McCloud and the 1976-1977 Danny Thomas situation comedy The Practice.

Shire's film and television scoring style is often compared to his late counterpart and contemporary Jerry Fielding.

== Musical theatre ==
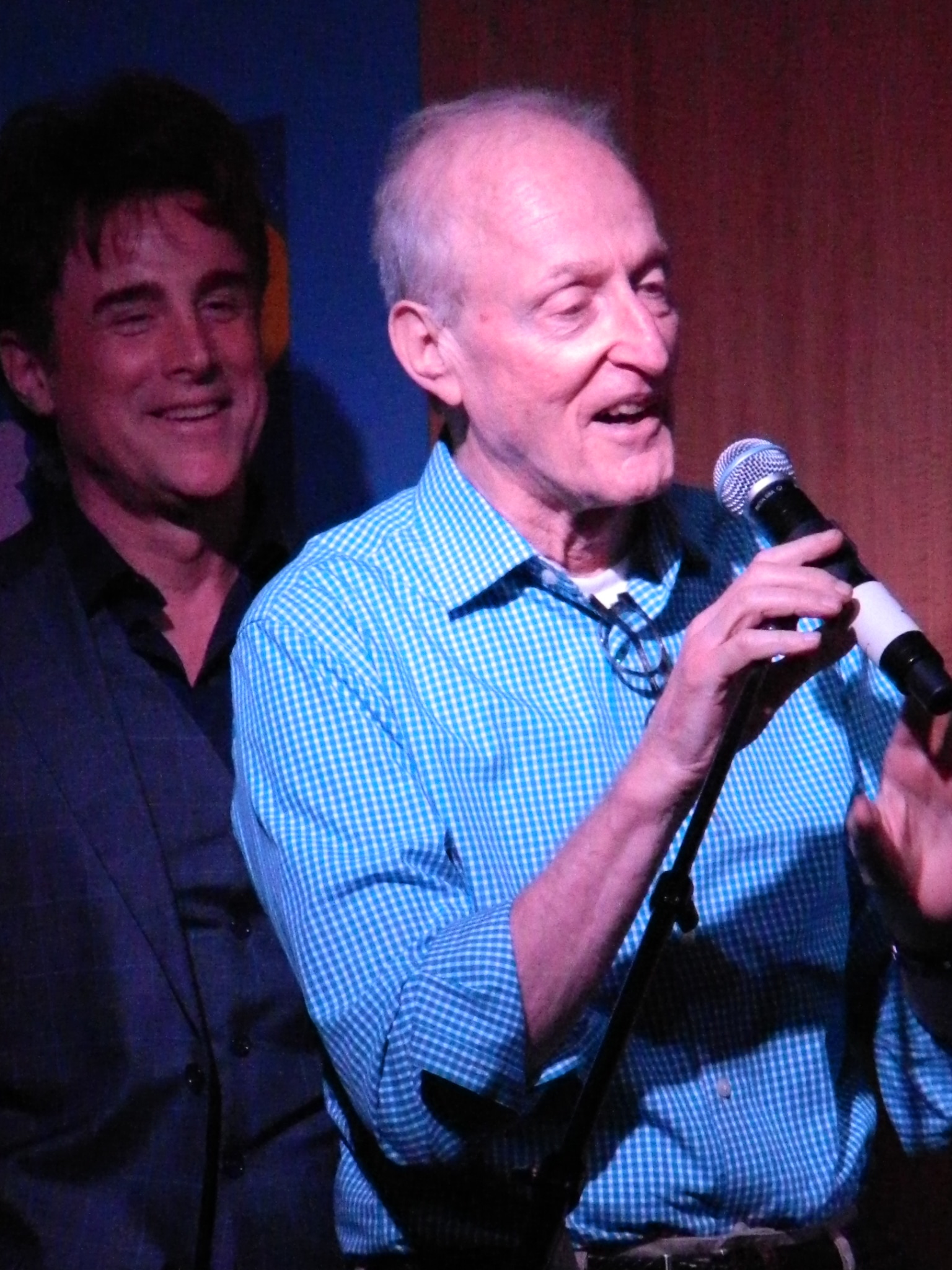
Shire at Barnes & Noble, New York with vocalist Sal Viviano in 2013.

As a pit pianist, Shire played for the original productions of both The Fantasticks and Funny Girl, eventually serving as Barbra Streisand's accompanist for several years. He also intermittently conducted and arranged for her (most notably for her television specials Color Me Barbra and The Belle of Fourteenth Street), and over a period of several years she recorded five of his songs.

Shire's musical theatre work, always in collaboration with lyricist Richard Maltby, Jr. includes the two off-Broadway revues Starting Here, Starting Now (Grammy nomination for Best Cast Album) and Closer Than Ever (Outer Critic's Circle Award for Best Musical) and the two Broadway shows Baby (Tony nominations for Best Musical and Best Score) and Big (Tony nomination for Best Score). All of these shows have had hundreds of regional and stock productions worldwide. A new musical entitled Take Flight premiered in London at the Menier Chocolate Factory in July 2007, with a separate production in Tokyo in November 2007. Previously concert versions were performed in Australia and Russia. About Time (a sequel to Starting Here, Starting Now and Closer Than Ever) premiered in May 2025 at Goodspeed Musicals Norma Terris Theatre, and was subsequently produced at 54 Below in November 2025.

A Stream of Voices, a one-act opera, with libretto by Gene Scheer, for the Colorado Children's Chorale, premiered in June 2008 in Denver.

On October 27, 2012, the Broadway-style musical Loving the Silent Tears premiered in Los Angeles, including some songs composed by Shire.

== Miscellaneous ==
Shire has conducted many orchestras, either for film scores or for pop concerts, including the London Symphony Orchestra, The Los Angeles Philharmonic, the San Francisco Opera Orchestra, the Buffalo Philharmonic Orchestra and the Munich Symphony.

Shire wrote and composed many songs for the hit PBS children's TV series Shining Time Station, which starred his wife Didi Conn along with comedian George Carlin.

Shire serves on the council of the Dramatists Guild of America and is a trustee of the Rockland Conservatory of Music and the Palisades (New York) Library. He was inducted into the Buffalo Music Hall of Fame in 2006.

== Personal life ==
From 1970 to 1980, Shire was married to actress Talia Shire, with whom he has one son, screenwriter Matthew Shire.

He has been married to actress Didi Conn since 1984. They have a son, Daniel (born October 1992), who was diagnosed with autism.

Shire's brother, Sanford (Sandy) Shire, was also a conductor, most notably for comedian/impressionist Fred Travalena. He also published a book on the paintings of choreographer Antoni Nellé.

== Selected filmography ==
- One More Train to Rob (1971)
- Drive, He Said (1971)
- Summertree (1971)
- Skin Game (1971)
- To Find a Man (1972)
- Two People (1973)
- Class of '44 (1973)
- Showdown (1973)
- Killer Bees (1974)
- Sidekicks (1974)
- The Conversation (1974)
- The Taking of Pelham One Two Three (1974)
- The Hindenburg (1975)
- Farewell, My Lovely (1975)
- All the President's Men (1976)
- Harry and Walter Go to New York (1976)
- The Big Bus (1976)
- Raid on Entebbe (1977)
- Something for Joey (1977)
- Saturday Night Fever (1977)
- Straight Time (1978)
- Fast Break (1979)
- Norma Rae (1979)
- The Promise (1979)
- Old Boyfriends (1979)
- Apocalypse Now (1979, rejected)
- Only When I Laugh (1981)
- Paternity (1981)
- Max Dugan Returns (1983)
- Oh, God! You Devil (1984)
- 2010 (1984)
- The Blue Yonder (1985)
- Return to Oz (1985)
- Short Circuit (1986)
- 'night, Mother (1986)
- Vice Versa (1988)
- Backfire (1988)
- Monkey Shines (1988)
- Paris Trout (1991)
- Bed & Breakfast (1991)
- Four Eyes and Six Guns (1992)
- Homeward Bound: The Incredible Journey (1993, rejected)
- The Man Who Wouldn't Die (1995)
- The Streets of Laredo (1995)
- Rear Window (1998)
- Ash Wednesday (2002)
- Zodiac (2007)
- Beyond a Reasonable Doubt (2009)
- The American Side (2016)
- Love After Love (2017)

== Theatre credits ==
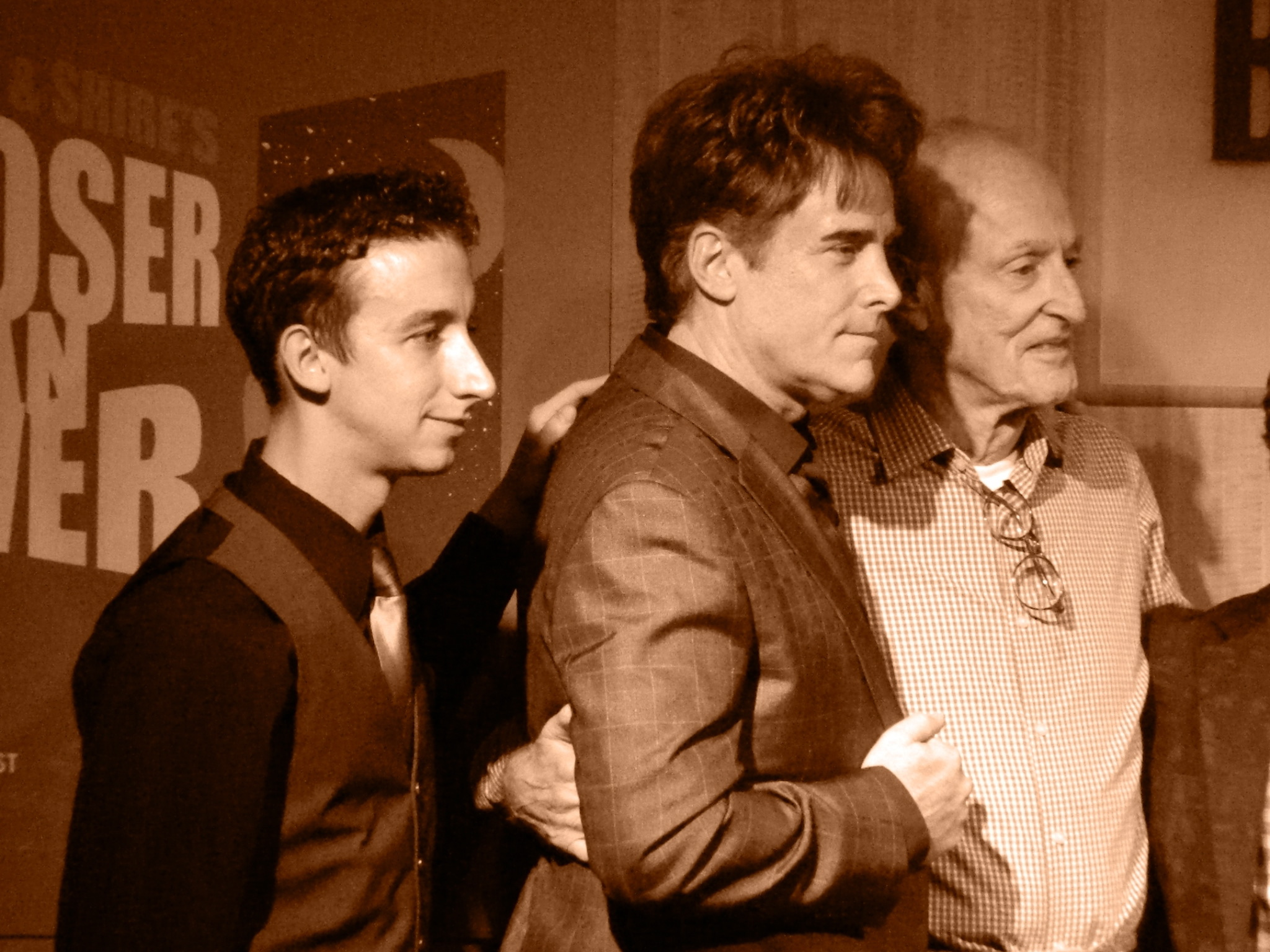
Shire onstage with Danny Weller (bass) and Sal Viviano (vocalist).

Broadway

- Anyone Can Whistle (1964) - rehearsal pianist
- Funny Girl (1964) - pit pianist and assistant conductor
- The Unknown Soldier and His Wife (1967) - incidental music
- How Do You Do, I Love You (1967) - composer
- Love Match (1968) - composer
- Company (1970) - dance music arranger
- Baby (1983) - composer - Tony Award for Best Original Score nomination
- Big (1996) - composer - Tony Award for Best Original Score nomination; Drama Desk Award for Outstanding Music nomination
- Saturday Night Fever - songwriter of "Manhattan Skyline," "Salsation," and "Night on Disco Mountain"

Off-Broadway (selected)

- Graham Crackers (1963)
- As You Like It (1973)
- Starting Here, Starting Now (1977)
- Urban Blight (1988)
- Closer Than Ever (1989) - Outer Critics Circle Award winner; NYC revival (2012)
- Smulnik's Waltz (1991)
- The Loman Family Picnic (1993)
- Visiting Mr. Green (1997)
- Take Flight (2005–2011) - productions in London (Menier Chocolate Factory), Tokyo, and Princeton (McCarter Theatre)
- About Time, Richard Maltby Jr. lyricist and director, (2025, Norma Terris Theatre at Goodspeed Opera House, CT)

== Notable songs ==
- "With You I'm Born Again" - lyrics by Carol Connors - international chart hit by Billy Preston and Syreeta
- "Starting Here, Starting Now", "Autumn" - lyrics by Richard Maltby, Jr. - recorded by Barbra Streisand
- "One Of The Good Girls" - lyrics by Richard Maltby, Jr. - recorded by Susannah McCorkle
- "Stop, Time" - lyrics by Richard Maltby, Jr. - recorded by Susannah McCorkle
- "What About Today", "The Morning After" - music and lyrics - recorded by Barbra Streisand
- "The Promise (I'll Never Say Goodbye)" (Academy Award nominee) - lyrics by Alan and Marilyn Bergman - recorded by Debby Boone, Melissa Manchester, and Barbra Streisand.
- "Manhattan Skyline", "Salsation" - original music contributions to the Saturday Night Fever soundtrack album
- "Night on Disco Mountain" - an adaptation of Modest Mussorgsky's "Night On Bald Mountain", also on the Saturday Night Fever soundtrack
- "It Goes Like It Goes" - lyrics by Norman Gimbel - recorded by Jennifer Warnes - (Academy Award winner); and Maureen McGovern.
- "Coffee, Black" - lyrics by Maltby - recorded by John Pizzarelli
- "Washington Square" - words and music (with Bob Goldstein) - recorded by The Village Stompers

== See also ==
- Coppola family tree
