= Joe Muranyi =

American jazz musician

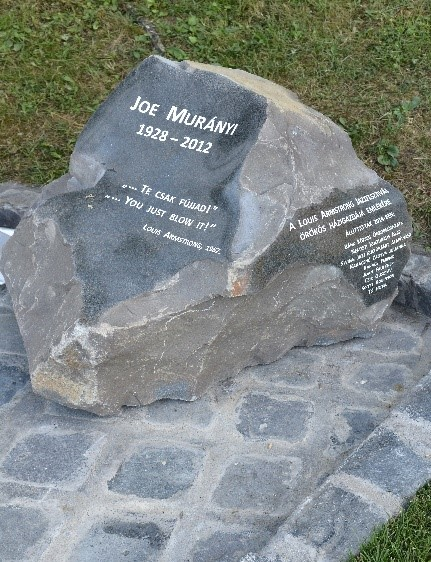
A monument to Joe Muranyi in Bánk, Hungary.

Joseph P. Muranyi (January 14, 1928 – April 20, 2012) was an American jazz clarinetist, producer and critic.

Muranyi studied with Lennie Tristano but was primarily interested in early jazz styles such as Dixieland and swing. After playing in a United States Army Air Forces band, he moved to New York City in the 1950s, and attended the Manhattan School of Music and Columbia University. In the 1950s he played under Eddie Condon, collaborating with Jimmy McPartland, Max Kaminsky, Yank Lawson, Bobby Hackett, and Red Allen. During that decade he also played with the Red Onion Jazz Band (1952–54), Danny Barker (1958), and Wingy Manone.

In 1963, Muranyi played with The Village Stompers, a Dixieland band which reached the pop charts with its song "Washington Square". From 1967 to 1971 he was the clarinetist with the Louis Armstrong All-Stars. Armstrong, after initially struggling to pronounce Muranyi's Hungarian family name, introduced him on stage as "Joe Ma Rainey", to Muranyi's own amusement. Following this he played with Roy Eldridge, World's Greatest Jazz Band (1975), Cozy Cole, Lionel Hampton, Herman Autrey, Wild Bill Davison, Zutty Singleton, and others.

Muranyi did extensive work as a record producer, and wrote liner notes for hundreds of albums. He played both soprano and tenor saxophone.

== Other sources ==
- Scott Yanow, Joe Muranyi at AllMusic
- Leonard Feather and Ira Gitler, The Biographical Encyclopedia of Music. Oxford, 1999, pp. 486–87
