= Multimedia cartography =

Multimedia cartography is the collection of geographical information in a manner that allows presentation through various display interfaces.

Through multimedia, technology allows for differing ways of presenting geographic information. The presentation is intended to expand the channels of information available to the user from those of paper-based maps. Multimedia offers a different way to view data that has been generated and stored by spatial resource packages.
