= The Green (Charlotte, North Carolina) =

Park in North Carolina, United States

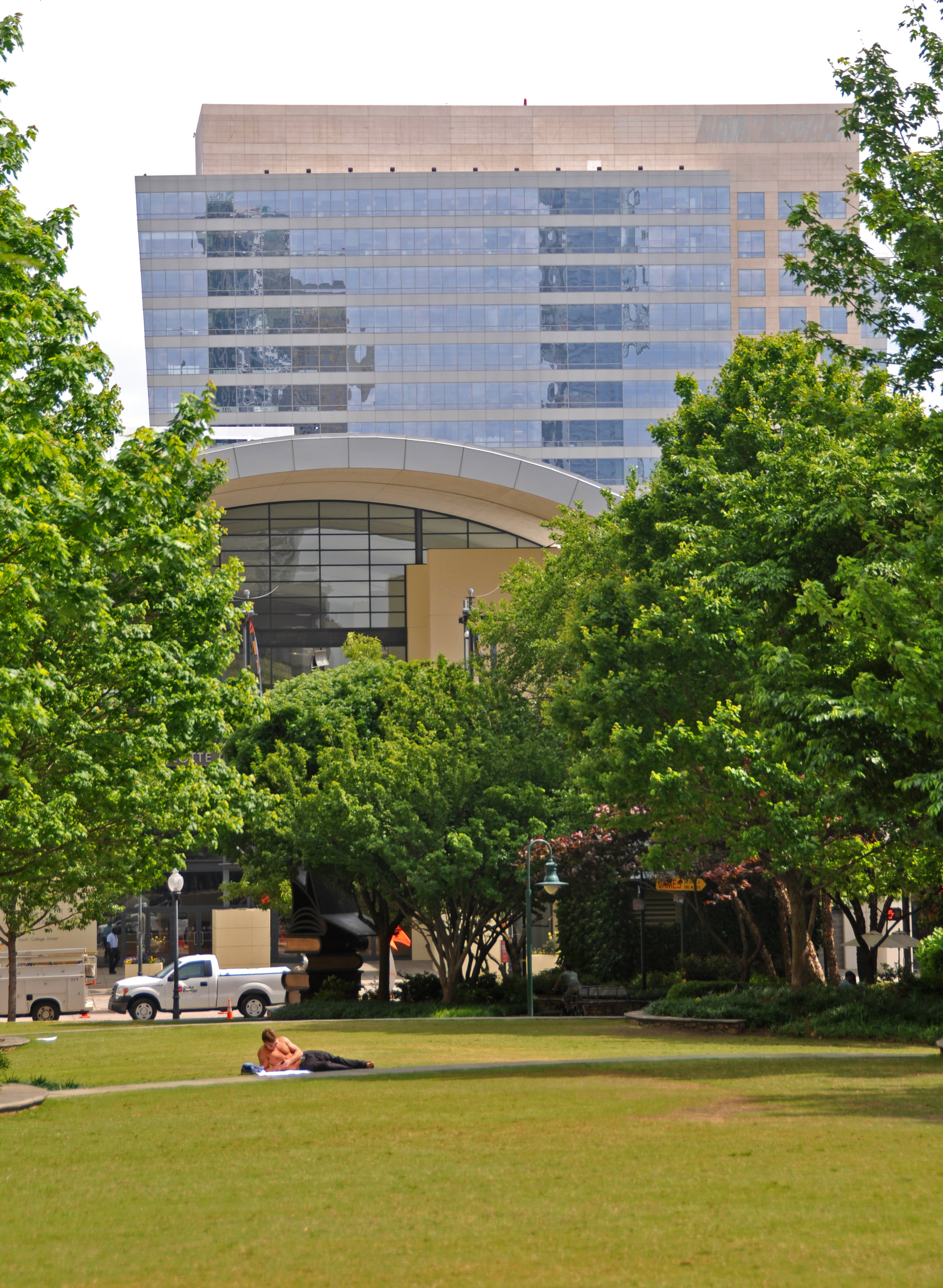
- Interactive map of The Green
- Type: Urban park
- Location: Charlotte, North Carolina
- Coordinates: 35.2239°N 80.8467°W
- Area: 1.5 acres (0.61 ha)
- Created: 2002
- Operator: Wells Fargo
- Public transit: 3rd Street/CC

The Green is a 0.5-acre (0.20 ha) park at 400 South Tryon Street in uptown Charlotte, North Carolina. At one end of this so-called pocket park are the Mint Museum and the Bechtler Museum of Modern Art; at the other end is the Charlotte Convention Center. Next to it stands Charlotte's historic St. Peter's Catholic Church. The Green is the site of various public events, such as movie screenings and free plays, including summer performances by the Charlotte Shakespeare Festival. This park is frequently the site of public art and sculpture, including three giant computer-timed fish fountains, a popular feature with children in the summer. Mosaic benches and stools are tucked away in shady side paths. Five large sculptures by the French artist Niki de Saint Phalle stood in The Green from January through October 2011.

The park has an overall theme of world literature. Prominent among the permanent sculptures are large bronze representations of books from the canon of world literature, for example, Roots by Alex Haley. There are quotes by famous writers and many whimsical direction signs pointing to real places but combined to form the name of well-known authors, for example, signs pointing to Edgar (Wisconsin), Allan (Saskatchewan), and Poe (Alberta). Other signposts point to cities named Charlotte around the world.

Close to many takeout restaurants, the Green is a favorite lunchtime destination for people who work in Uptown Charlotte. It is also a popular venue for weddings and receptions.

From late November to early January The Green used to feature a small ice rink—the only outdoor rink in Charlotte; but in November 2011, after seven years on The Green, the rink was moved to the NASCAR Hall of Fame plaza.

The Green is owned by Wells Fargo and was designed by Wagner Murray Architects of Charlotte and was completed in 2002. This small and serene green space is an integral part of Charlotte's Second Ward.
