= Universal multimedia access =

Delivery of multimedia resources

The Universal Multimedia Access (UMA) addresses the delivery of multimedia resources under different and varying network conditions, diverse terminal equipment capabilities, specific user or creator preferences and needs and usage environment conditions. It aims for guaranteed unrestricted access to multimedia content from any device, through any network, independently of the original content format, efficiently satisfying user preferences and usage environment conditions.

== Requirements ==
The fulfilment of UMA requires that content is remotely searchable and accessible, with useful descriptions of it and its context, and mediation/delivery systems can use this information to serve users regardless of location, format and type of terminal or network connections, respecting user preferences, environmental conditions and ownership and usage rights.

== Approach ==
One feasible approach to implement UMA, is to develop context-aware systems that use the content and context descriptions to decide upon the need to adapt the content before delivering it to the end-user. The use of open ontologies and standards to structure, represent and convey those descriptions as well as to specify the kind of adaptation operations is vital for the success of UMA. This is especially true in loosely coupled environments such as the Internet, where heterogeneous end-users devices, varied content formats, repositories and networking technologies co-exist. Standards from the W3C such as OWL (Web Ontology Language) or CC/PP (Content Capability/Preferences Profile) and from ISO/IEC such as MPEG-7 and especially MPEG-21, are well-suited for the implementation of UMA-enabler systems.
