= Starting Here, Starting Now =

1976 musical revue

Starting Here, Starting Now is a musical revue with lyrics by Richard Maltby Jr. and music by David Shire. With a cast of three and three musicians, the revue explores a variety of romantic relationships.

== Productions ==
The revue was first produced at the Manhattan Theater Club in 1976 under the title Theater Songs by Maltby and Shire. In March 1977, the show moved to the Barbarann Theater Restaurant in New York City, where it ran for 120 performances. The cast featured Loni Ackerman, Margery Cohen and George Lee Andrews. The original cast album was nominated for a Grammy Award, and the 1993 London production also produced a cast album. The revue continues to be frequently produced.

After Maltby and Shire graduated from Yale, they wrote many songs for shows that either closed out of town or were never produced. Their songs tend to be "story songs", each giving the character(s) a chance to explore a mini-drama. The two writers decided to assemble these songs into a revue, grouping them by theme.

== Synopsis ==
Act I explores the humorous, joyful, melancholy and angry ups and downs of city romances. In Act II, the songs present characters who have had unlucky experiences in love and life and who have a chance at a new start.

== Song list ==
- The Word Is Love
- Starting Here, Starting Now
- A Little Bit Off
- We Can Talk To Each Other
- Just Across The River
- I Think I May Want to Remember Today
- Today Is the First Day Of The Rest Of My Life
- Beautiful
- Crossword Puzzle
- Autumn
- I Don't Remember Christmas
- I Don't Believe It
- I'm Going To Make You Beautiful
- You Can't Let Down Your Fans
- A Girl You Should Know
- Travel
- Watching The Big Parade Go By
- What About Today
- One Step
- Barbara
- Song Of Me
- A New Life Coming
- Pleased with Myself
- Flair
- I Hear Bells

The Original Cast recording was released in 1977 by RCA.
