= Closer Than Ever =

- Original Cast Recording
- Music: David Shire
- Lyrics: Richard Maltby, Jr.
- Book: Revue
- Productions: 1989 Off-Broadway; 2012 Off-Broadway Revival
- Awards: Outer Critics' Best Off-Broadway Musical

Closer Than Ever is a musical revue in two acts, with words by Richard Maltby, Jr. and music by David Shire. The revue contains no dialogue, and Maltby and Shire have described this show as a "bookless book musical." The show was originally conceived by Steven Scott Smith as a one act revue entitled Next Time Now!, which was first given at the nightclub Eighty-Eights.

The success of Next Time Now! led to a much expanded production retitled Closer Than Ever that was co-directed by Maltby and Smith and featured musical direction by Patrick Scott Brady. This production began its life at the Williamstown Theatre Festival in Massachusetts during the summer of 1989. It then came to New York, beginning previews on October 17 and officially opening November 6 at the off-Broadway Cherry Lane Theatre, where it ran for 312 performances. The cast included Brent Barrett, Sally Mayes, Richard Muenz, and Lynne Wintersteller.

Closer Than Ever features self-contained songs which deal with such diverse topics as security, aging, mid-life crisis, second marriages, working couples, and unrequited love. Maltby and Shire based many of the songs on real-life experiences of their friends, or stories told to them. The revue won the Outer Critics Circle Award for Best Off-Broadway Musical and Maltby, Shire, and Wintersteller all garnered Drama Desk Award nominations for their respective contributions. The original New York cast recorded an album of the revue for RCA Victor (RCA Victor 60399).

== Background ==
In 1984, Maltby began compiling a series of older songs and new song ideas to form an evening of musical short stories, which he labeled the "Urban File". In particular, he wanted to make use of one of his favorite songs, "The Bear, The Tiger, The Hamster, and The Mole", which had been cut from Maltby and Shire's 1983 musical Baby. Maltby assembled other cut songs from earlier musicals such as The River, Love Match and The Sap of Life to go with this particular song. The "Urban File" also contained lyric fragments, musical ideas, song fragments, rhythmic ideas, philosophical observations, and biographical details of friends and acquaintances as potential material for songs. During this time, Maltby was occupied with Song and Dance, and Shire was busy composing film scores, so that the "Urban File" was not a primary project at the time.

In 1987, Lynne Meadow, artistic director of the Manhattan Theatre Club, approached Maltby and Shire to ask for a song for a topical revue on urban themes that director John Tillinger was creating. Maltby showed them his "Urban File", which Tillinger and Meadow found appealing. Tillinger had initially planned on only a small amount of music, but after seeing the file, altered his original concept, with the final product being six songs by Maltby and Shire and one song by Edward Kleban. The work was a critical success with both the public and critics. New songs for this production included "There's Nothing Like It", "Miss Byrd" and "One of the Good Guys". They also wrote "Three Friends" for the revue, but finally did not use it. The music was interspersed with dramatic sketches on urban themes by various playwrights, including Christopher Durang, A. R. Gurney, Terrence McNally, Arthur Miller, Shel Silverstein, Ted Tally, and Wendy Wasserstein. Titled Urban Blight, the revue premiered in May 1988 and ran for six weeks at the Manhattan Theatre Club. The cast included Larry Fishburne, John Rubinstein, Oliver Platt, Nancy Giles, Faith Prince, Rex Robbins and E. Katherine Kerr.

In the Fall of 1988, playwright, director, and pianist Steven Scott Smith, an assistant to Maltby, approached Maltby and Shire for permission to use the "Urban File," with some other unused songs of theirs, to assemble a cabaret evening consisting entirely of their music. Maltby and Shire approved this, and Smith began to assemble a review titled Next Time, Now! with director Brady and choreographer Arthur Faria. One of the songs added into this show was "Life Story." The one-hour cabaret show opened in January 1989 at Eighty-Eight's, a nightclub in Greenwich Village, with Brent Barrett, Michael Brian and Lynne Wintersteller as the show's performers. The work was a critical success with both the public and critics, and Maltby and Shire decided to expand this product into a full evening-length show.

Maltby and Shire received support to expand the show when producers Janet Brenner, Michael Gill, and Daryl Roth came on board. They wanted to turn the production into a two act evening, which required new songs and additional material from the "Urban File." The show also added one more actress, Sally Mayes, to the cast. New songs written for the expansion include the opening number, "Doors," "You Want To Be My Friend?," "Fandango," "If I Sing," "The March of Time," "Back On Base," and the finale, "Closer Than Ever." "Another Wedding Song," written by Shire and his wife Didi Conn for their wedding, was also added into the show at this time. The full-scale version of the show went through a trial run at the Williamstown Theatre Festival in Massachusetts during the summer of 1989. Marcia Milgrom Dodge was hired to choreograph the expanded show and Maltby became Smith's co-director. Well received by audiences, the show headed for New York City.

== Revivals ==
The revue has received a number of revivals at Regional theatres throughout the United States, including a production at the Westport Country Playhouse in January 1991, an April 1996 production at the Fleetwood Stage in Mount Vernon, New York, an August 2002 production at the MetroStage in Washington D.C., a 2005 production at the Porchlight Music Theatre in Chicago, and a March 2008 production by Charlotte Shakespeare in Charlotte, North Carolina. In September 2006 the show had its London stage debut at the Bridewell Theatre.

Closer Than Ever celebrated its 20th anniversary with runs at Queens Theatre in the Park and The Bristol Riverside Theatre in April and May 2010; original cast members Wintersteller and Mayes co-starred with Sal Viviano and George Dvorsky, with Maltby and Kurt Stamm co-directing choreography by Stamm. Also returning were Brady as musical director (and the third male performer in two songs) and bassist Robert D. Renino, who had also played during the show's original run. These productions featured two new songs: "Dating Again," replacing "The Sound of Muzak" in the first act, and "There's Something in a Wedding," added as an introduction to "Another Wedding Song." The Shandaken Theatrical Society launched a production that ran from August 14–21, 2010 directed by Ricarda O'Conner and starred Janna Cardia, Alex Agard, and Austin Ku, Amy Wallace, and Chuck Sokolowski, and with musical director Eric Thomas Johnson.

In 2012, Producers Neil Berg and Adam Friedson, in conjunction with the York Theatre, revived the show Off-Broadway. Like the Queens Theatre production, this one was co-directed by Maltby and Stamm, with Stamm choreographing; used the same song stack; and starred Viviano and Dvorsky in the male roles. Cast alongside them were Broadway favorites Jenn Colella (in Mayes's track) and Christiane Noll (in Wintersteller's). The production ran from June to November and was well received by The New York Times and The New Yorker among other major media. It won the 2012/2013 Off Broadway Alliance Award for Best Musical Revival. A new cast recording was released by Jay Records in July 2013.

Houston's UpStage Theatre opened their 2015–16 season with a production staged by John Carmona, musical direction by Lucy Cain Hargis, and starring Ruth Calabrese, Michael C. Shivers, Faith Taylor, and Joe Carl White.

== Musical numbers ==
Original Production

Act I

- "Doors"
- "She Loves Me Not"
- "You Want to Be My Friend?"
- "What Am I Doin'?"
- "The Bear, the Tiger, the Hamster and the Mole"
- "Like a Baby"†
- "Miss Byrd"
- "The Sound of Muzak"
- "One of the Good Guys"
- "There's Nothing Like It"
- "Life Story"
- "Next Time"/"I Wouldn't Go Back"

Act II

- "Three Friends"
- "Fandango"
- "There"
- "Patterns"
- "Another Wedding Song"
- "If I Sing"
- "Back on Base"
- "The March of Time"
- "Fathers of Fathers"
- "It's Never That Easy"/"I've Been Here Before"
- "Closer Than Ever"

† Replaced during the run with "I'll Get Up Tomorrow Morning."

2010 Revised Version

Act I

- "Doors"
- "She Loves Me Not"
- "You Want to Be My Friend?"
- "What Am I Doin'?"
- "The Bear, the Tiger, the Hamster and the Mole"
- "I'll Get Up Tomorrow Morning"
- "Miss Byrd"
- "Dating Again"
- "One of the Good Guys"
- "There's Nothing Like It"
- "Life Story"
- "Next Time"/"I Wouldn't Go Back"

Act II

- "Three Friends"
- "Fandango"
- "There"
- "Patterns"
- "There's Something in a Wedding"
- "Another Wedding Song"
- "If I Sing"
- "Back on Base"
- "The March of Time"
- "Fathers of Fathers"
- "It's Never That Easy/I've Been Here Before"
- "Closer Than Ever"
