= Washington Square (composition) =

Single by The Village Stompers

from the album The Original Washington Square
- B-side: "Turkish Delight"
- Released: 23 August 1963
- Recorded: 1963
- Genre: Pop, Dixieland jazz, instrumental
- Length: 2:42
- Label: Epic
- Songwriters: Bobb Goldsteinn, David Shire
- Producer: Joe Sherman

The Village Stompers singles chronology
"Washington Square" (1963)	"The La-Dee Da Song" (1964)

"Washington Square" is a popular instrumental from 1963 by the New York City-based jazz group The Village Stompers. The composition was written by Bobb Goldsteinn and David Shire.

== Background ==
The composition is named after the famous park in New York City.

== Chart performance ==
"Washington Square" was a hit single, reaching No. 2 on the Billboard Hot 100 chart in the week ending 23 November 1963, kept from the summit of the Billboard Hot 100 by Dale and Grace's hit song "I'm Leaving It Up to You". "Washington Square" did, however, top the Billboard Easy Listening chart for three weeks that November and made the top 30 on the Billboard R&B chart. In Canada it was No. 5 for 2 weeks. It reached #3 on the Lever Hit Parade in New Zealand

== Accolades ==
In addition, the instrumental was nominated for a Grammy Award in the category Best Instrumental Theme.

== Other recordings ==
Other artists have recorded the tune, sometimes with song lyrics. Among these acts are:

- The Ames Brothers 1963 (without Ed Ames; their last national chart record)
- The Kirby Stone Four 1963
- Lawrence Welk 1963
- Kenny Ball 1963
- Spike Jones 1963
- Kai Winding 1963
- Sammy Kaye & His Orchestra 1964
- Andre Kostelanetz 1964
- Billy Vaughn 1964
- Glenn Miller Orchestra 1965
- Marilyn Maye 1965
- The Dukes of Dixieland 1968
- James Last 1970
- Percy Faith 1974
- The Ventures 1980
- Nightmares on Wax 1999
- Chinese Man 2006.

In Asia:

- The South Korean female vocalist band Lee Sisters released a recording of this tune.
- Another South Korean group, named Key Boys, also released a recording of this tune under the title "미소 （微笑）(Washington Square)" in 1964.
- The Hong Kong Cantopop artist Samuel Hui also released a recording of the tune in Cantonese, titled 學生哥 (hok6 saang1 go1) for the film The Contract, with new lyrics exhorting boys to be studious.

== Popular culture ==
- The tune was also featured as a very important plot piece in the 2020 Stephen King HBO drama The Outsider.

== See also ==
- List of number-one adult contemporary singles of 1963 (U.S.)
