= The Seattle Globalist =

Seattle based online newspaper

- Type: Online newspaper
- Format: Digital
- Founder(s): Alex Stonehill, Sarah Stuteville, Jessica Partnow
- Founded: 2006 (as Common Language Project)
- Ceased publication: September 30, 2020
- Relaunched: 2012 (as The Seattle Globalist)
- Language: English
- Headquarters: Seattle, Washington, U.S.
- Website: seattleglobalist.com

The Seattle Globalist was an online news publication with a specific focus on exploring the interplay between international and local affairs within the Seattle area, and an emphasis on amplifying the voices of diverse communities that were frequently overlooked or misrepresented in traditional media outlets. During its peak in 2016, the Seattle Globalist had a "hyper-diverse newsroom", with 67% of its contributors hailing from various ethnic backgrounds, 73% being female, and 45% being immigrants or first-generation Americans. Originally known as the Common Language Project, the initiative was established in 2006 by Alex Stonehill, Sarah Stuteville, and Jessica Partnow at Hunter College, Subsequently, the project underwent a name change in 2012 when it was relocated to the Department of Communications at the University of Washington, adopting the title The Seattle Globalist.

Seattle Globalist journalists conducted in-depth multimedia reporting, exploring lesser-known subjects. Projects included investigating the intersection of youth and politics in the former Soviet Union, resulting in the production of "Generation Putin," a one-hour public radio special aired on over 40 stations nationwide. In 2013, the Globalist released its first feature-length documentary, "BARZAN," detailing the experiences of a local family involved in a terrorism investigation post-9/11. The same year saw the development of "Slum Rising," a three-part series highlighting the transformation of a Nairobi slum into an innovation hub. Additionally, they launched "The Cost of Gender," a multimedia project examining the state of transgender healthcare in the United States and exploring reasons behind some Americans seeking such healthcare abroad.

In 2015 The Seattle Globalist ran a community media workshop series that served as a deconstructed journalism school for Seattle’s minority and international communities, called "Your City. Your Story. Your Voice."

In 2017 The Seattle Globalist reported on Finn Sullivan's story of arrest and subsequent participation in a diversion program. Focused on arts that gave him skills to pursue a career upon completion.

The Seattle Globalist was one of the first news organizations to publish Marcus Harrison Greens work, the founder of the South Seattle Emerald.

The Seattle Globalist gave awards to notable people, such as naming Sahar Fathi “Seattle’s Smartest Global Women,” in 2014. And Rita Meher as the "Globalist of the year," in 2015.

In 2016, due to university budget constraints, the Seattle Globalist lost funding. The Globalist had partial funding through fundraising efforts and continued publication for a few years after losing the support of the University of Washington, The Seattle Globalist was given a $100,000 grant by the Bill and Melinda Gates Foundation in 2017, for "general operating support." the Seattle Globalist ultimately ceased its operations on September 30, 2020.
