= Kirby Stone Four =

American vocal group

- Origin: New York City, U.S.
- Genres: Pop; rock & roll
- Years active: 1950s–1960s
- Labels: Cadence; Columbia; Coronet; Warner Bros.
- Past members: Kirby Stone; Eddie Hall; Mike Gardner; Larry Foster

The Kirby Stone Four were an American vocal ensemble popular in the 1950s and early 1960s.

Founded by Kirby Stone in the years after World War II, the group began performing in the New York-area clubs. They won slots on local television, including The Ed Sullivan Show, and soon after signed to Columbia Records. Several LPs followed, including Baubles, Bangles and Beads; their version of the song "Baubles, Bangles and Beads" became a hit in the U.S. in 1958, reaching No. 25 on the Billboard Hot 100. The song was also nominated for a Grammy Award. On the strength of the single, the album reached No. 13 on the Billboard 200.

Among the backing musicians featured on Kirby Stone Four albums were Jimmy Carroll's orchestra, the Kai Winding Quartet, Alvino Rey, Shelly Manne, and Al Klink. Their style — which melded swing jazz, vocalese, and early rock and roll — was referred to as "The Go Sound". They made many appearances on U.S. television shows such as The Judy Garland Show and The Dean Martin Show into the mid-1960s. By that time their sound was taken over by the Ray Conniff Orchestra and Singers. In 1966, they recorded a rock & roll album with The Tokens as the United States Double Quartet. During this time Stone directed several TV variety shows.

Some of their output has been re-released on CD by Collectables Records.

== Members ==
- Kirby Stone (born April 27, 1918, New York, died July 13, 1981)
- Eddie Hall (born Edwin Holzman; April 23, 1921 – November 16, 2012)
- Mike Gardner
- Larry Foster

== Discography ==
- Man, I Flipped When I Heard the Kirby Stone Four (Cadence Records, 1958)
- Baubles, Bangles and Beads (Columbia, 1958) (Released as "Whooping It Up!" in Europe)
- The Go Sound (Columbia, 1959)
- The Kirby Stone Touch (Columbia, 1959)
- Laugh Along with The Kirby Stone Four at the Playboy Club (Columbia, 1961)
- Get That Ball! (Columbia, 1962)
- Guys And Dolls (Columbia, 1962)
- Rippin' n' Soarin' (Coronet Records, 1963)
- Wow! (Warner Bros. Records, 1963)
- My Fair Lady Swings (Warner Bros. Records., 1964)
- Things Are Swinging (Warner Bros. Records, 1964)
- Show Time!
- Kirby Stone Four Singalong
- Kirby Stone Four & The Tokens: Life Is Groovy
- Betcha' by Golly, Wow!
