= The Village Stompers =

American Dixieland jazz group

The Village Stompers were an American Dixieland jazz group during the 1950s and '60s. The group developed a folk-dixie style that began with the hit song "Washington Square".

The Village Stompers came from Greenwich Village in New York City and consisted of Dick Brady, Don Coates, Ralph Casale, Frank Hubbell, Lenny Pogan, Al McManus, Don Steele, Mitchell May, and Joe Muranyi. Their song "Washington Square" reached No. 2 on the Billboard magazine Hot 100 singles chart in 1963, and No. 1 on the Adult Contemporary Chart. Their hits included "From Russia with Love"/"The Bridge of Budapest" in April 1964 (No. 81) and "Fiddler on the Roof"/"Moonlight on the Ganges" in December 1964 (No. 97) and No. 19 on the Adult Contemporary Chart. Three other tracks made the Billboard Bubbling Under chart: "The La-Dee-Song"/"Blue Grass" February 1964 (104), "Oh! Marie"/ "Limehouse Blues" in October 1964 (132), and "Those Magnificent Men in Their Flying Machines"/"Sweet Water Bay" in July 1965 (130 pop chart and 35 Adult Contemporary).

The group disbanded in 1967.

== Discography ==
- 1963 Washington Square
- 1964 More Sounds of Washington Square
- 1964 Around the World with the Village Stompers
- 1965 Some Folk, a Bit of Country and a Whole Lot of Dixie
- 1965 New Beat on Broadway
- 1966 Taste of Honey and Other Goodies
- 1967 Live at the Copa
- 1967 One More Time
- 1967 Greatest Hits
